= Up Here Festival =

Annual art and music festival in Sudbury, Ontario, Canada

The Up Here Festival is an annual art and music festival, staged each summer in Greater Sudbury, Ontario, Canada. Based on the theme of beautifying and transforming the city through public art, the festival blends the creation of new public murals and installation art projects with a lineup of musical performances.

The festival was launched by We Live Up Here, an arts organization which grew out of a 2012 book project by local artists Christian Pelletier and Andrew Knapp. It was also partially inspired by the Nuit Blanche model of art festivals, which make use of unexpected and non-traditional spaces to change the public's relationship with art, using the city's entire downtown core as a giant open-air venue.

== 2015 ==
The festival was first staged in 2015; participating artists included Troy Lovegate, Labrona, Alexandra Mackenzie, Trevor Wheatley, Johanna Westby, Danielle Daniel, Nico Glaude and Alexandra Berens-Firth while the musical component was headlined by A Tribe Called Red, Tanya Tagaq and Suuns.

== 2016 ==
Artists at the 2016 festival included Ella et Pitr, Ola Volo, Kirsten McCrea, Thesis Sahib, Hobz, Tracy Baker and Neli Nenkova, while performing musicians included Casper Skulls, Cris Derksen, Dilly Dally, Foxtrott, Holy Fuck, Hooded Fang, iskwē, Partner, Stars, U.S. Girls, Young Galaxy and Young Rival.

== 2017 ==
Participating artists were Jarus and Mique Michelle as muralists, while local artists Kallie Berens-Firth, Sonia Ekiyor-Katimi, Melanie Gail St-Pierre, Madison Kotyluk, Bianca Lefebvre, Matti Lehtelä, Scott Minor, Maty Ralph, Jay Rice, Holly Robin, Julianne Steedman, Dani Taillefer and Isaac Weber participated in the Power Up Project to paint 24 downtown electrical boxes.

Performing musicians included The Fleshtones, Duchess Says, Deerhoof, Samito, Lido Pimienta and Yamantaka // Sonic Titan.

== 2018 ==
Musical performers included Patrick Watson, Jeremy Dutcher, Venetian Snares, Daniel Lanois, Efrim Menuck, Frederick Squire, Random Recipe, The Sorority and Charlotte Day Wilson. Artists included Angela Perdue, Aidan Lucas, Maeve Macdonald, Birdo, Ben Johnston, Haley Rose, Johanna Westby, Kelly Barbosa, Kristina Rolander, Mariana Lafrance, Ness Lee, Sarah Blondin and Sarah Dempsey.

== 2019 ==
The 2019 festival was noted for the creation, by graffiti artist RISK, of the largest public mural in Canada, at the disused St. Joseph's Health Centre site of Health Sciences North. Some specialized painting equipment was stolen from the site during the festival, but the mural was completed by August 31.

Performers included ESG, Snotty Nose Rez Kids, Milk & Bone, Hubert Lenoir, Yonatan Gat, Charlotte Cardin, Reykjavíkurdætur, Cartel Madras and Steve Lambke.

== 2020 ==
Due to the COVID-19 pandemic in Canada, the musical component of the festival was not staged in 2020; however, various art and mural projects by artists such as Sonia Ekiyor-Katimi, Chantal Abdel-Nour, Ashley Guenette and Lümen Moratz were still undertaken.

== 2021 ==
The 2021 festival was noted for the creation, by artist Kevin Ledo, of a mural memorializing Sudbury native Alex Trebek on the outer wall of Sudbury Secondary School. Other participating artists included Alex Berens, Tammy Gaber, Lauren Verwolf, Sarah Dempsey and DRPN Soul.

Performing musicians included Marie Davidson, NYSSA, The 555, Cadence Weapon, Naya Ali, Jor’Del Downz, Julie Katrinette, Casper Skulls and Zoon.

== 2022 ==
For the first time in the history of the event, the 2022 festival allowed some of the older murals to be "retired" and painted over with new works. It also marked the addition of the city's new Place des Arts to the list of venues, and featured a Sunday afternoon "mystery tour", in which three outdoor musical venues would feature "pop-up" shows by musicians who were not announced in advance.

Performers included Absolutely Free, The Ape-ettes, aurel, Backxwash, DijahSB, DJ Redo, DJ Seith, Ellemetue, Emilio Portal, Exmiranda, Ghostly Kisses, Groovy Betty, Hippie Hourrah, Jane Inc., Jasmyn, Kimmortal, l’loop, La Luz, LaFHomme, Lee Paradise, Like a Girl, Louis Simão, Matt Foy, Maxwell José, OBUXUM, Peach Pact, Pierre Kwenders, Quintron and Miss Pussycat, Seulement, Sister Ray, Status/Non-Status, Thea May and Troy Junker, Tommy and the Commies, Uncle Stu, Will Powers, Wolf Saga and YONI. Art projects were by Alex Bierk, Anong Migwans Beam, Born in the North, Catdog3000, Christian Chapman, Lauren Verwolf, Luella, Maxine Lemieux, Melanie Vanco, Nico Glaude, Stephanie Babij, Stephanie Hrechka, Studio Nude Beach and the McEwen School of Architecture.

== 2023 ==
In 2023, festival organizers announced that they would be forced to scale back the event, following a loss of funding from the provincial Experience Ontario program. Most notably, they were forced to cancel an appearance by Latvian singer Elizabete Balčuz, who had been scheduled to appear as the festival's only international performer.

The announcement resulted in a rapid influx of over $8,000 in donations to the festival from the community.

Musical performers in 2023 included Bad Actors, Bibi Club, Bonnie Trash, Boogey the Beat, Braids, Devours, Debby Friday, Gustaf, Myst Milano, Nobro, Pa II, Psychbike, The Retail Simps, Someone's Daughter, Rose-Erin Stokes, Strange Attractor, Super Duty Tough Work, Tall Pork, U.S. Girls and Ric Wilson.

== 2024 ==
Musical performers in 2024 included Alix Fernz, Allie X, Anachnid, Bad Waitress, Bassline Jack, Beverly Glenn-Copeland, Casper Skulls, Cassidy Houston, City of Lakes Music Society, Corridor, Diva Worship, DJ Derek B, DJ Yerf T Spinnermin, Groovy Betty, Janette King, La Sécurité, Max Moon, Medussah, Mistaken for Wayne, Morgan Vie, Myriam Gendron, NADUH, Nicholas Cangiano, Omega Mighty, Paint by Numbers, Patricia Cano, Pelada, Population II, Pressure Pin, PUP, Rockpile, Sebastian Gaskin, Shuffle Puppy, Slash Need, Sydanie, Tafari Anthony, The 555, The Mystery Lights, Tobi, UZ, Witch Prophet and Yonatan Gat with Maalem Hassan BenJaafar.

== 2025 ==
The 2025 festival was headlined by Elisapie, with other performers including The OBGMs, Miesha and the Spanks, Bells Larsen, Ouri, Michie Mee, Marie Davidson, The Gruesomes, Octopoulpe, N Nao, Belly Hatcher, Akeem Oh, Allô Fantôme, Will Powers and TRIN.

== 2026 ==
Performers at the 2026 festival included SadBoi, Sook-Yin Lee, Miesha and the Spanks, Leanne Betasamosake Simpson, Quinton Barnes, Tedy, Weird Nightmare, Boyhood, Status/Non-Status, John from Dawson, Hologramme, Boutique Feelings, Lennie Rayen, Grief Debt and Samwoy. Muralists included June, La Pupila, Miskopwagan Asin and Cat Hexes, while participants in the Power Up Project were Aspen Groom, Brittany Lamers, Eli Blaauw, Ivan From the North, Kayode Jonathan Akande and Michael Morphiend.
