= The Microphones discography =

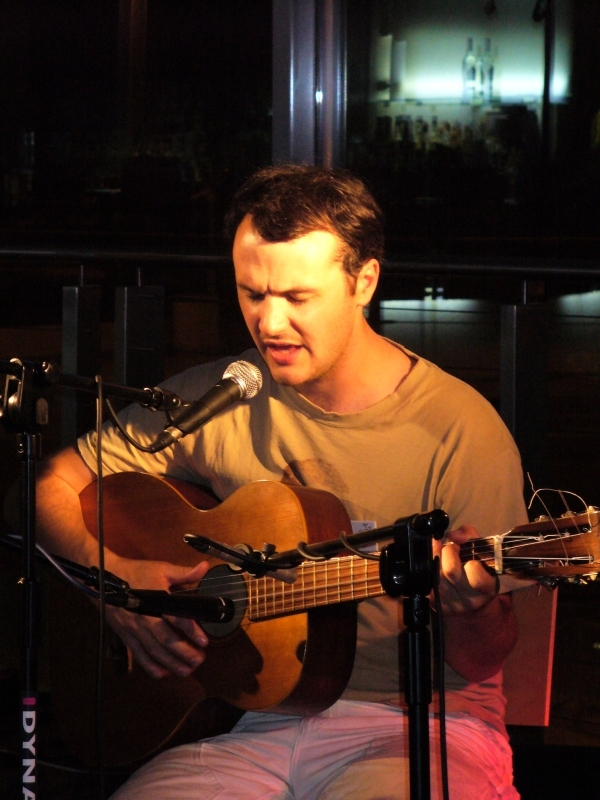
- Phil Elverum performing in 2008
- Studio albums: 5
- EPs: 3
- Live albums: 1
- Compilation albums: 5
- Singles: 8
- Demo albums: 4
- Other albums: 3

The Microphones were an American indie folk, indie rock, and experimental band, founded and fronted by Phil Elverum. The band has released 5 studio albums, 13 miscellaneous albums, (Note: Including live albums, box sets, compilation albums, and demo albums) 3 extended plays, and 8 singles. Elverum began the Microphones initially as a solo project, releasing cassette demos of tests and experiments. Between 1996 and 1998, Elverum released four demos, (Note: Elverum's first two cassette demos, Face Shapes and Beautiful Face, were released in 1996 but were not released under the Microphones name, thus are not included on this list.) mostly on Bret Lunsford's label Knw-Yr-Own. The CD Tests, released in June 1998, was a compilation album comprising tracks from previous cassettes. (Note: Elverum released two albums under the name "Tests", but they had different contents: the first was a demo cassette, and the second was a compilation CD of tracks from previous cassettes.) The same year, the band released the 7" single "Bass Drum Dream". The band's first studio album, Don't Wake Me Up, was released on K Records in August 1999 and gave the band a small following. Two more 7-inches were released in 1999: "Feedback (Life, Love, Loop)" and "Moon Moon".

The extended play Window: was released in February 2000. In September 2000, the studio album It Was Hot, We Stayed in the Water was released on K, solidifying Don't Wake Me Up's sound. The Glow Pt. 2 was released on K in September 2001; it went on to become a cult classic and Elverum's most critically acclaimed album. The same month, Blood was released, a limited-copy compilation album. Two 7-inches were released in 2001: "The Moon" and "I Can't Believe You Actually Died", the former included on The Glow Pt. 2.

The single compilation album Song Islands was released in August 2002, and the limited-copy album Little Bird Flies into a Big Black Cloud was released in September 2002. The 7-inch "Lanterns/Antlers" was also released in 2002, and was included on Song Islands. In 2003, the studio album Mount Eerie was released, along with two extended plays consisting of stems from the album: The Singing from Mt. Eerie and The Drums from Mt. Eerie. Mount Eerie is a concept album that portrays a linear storyline. After the release of Mount Eerie, Elverum retired the Microphones pseudonym and opted to release his music under Mount Eerie instead, as the themes of his music had changed.

There were some sparse releases during the Microphones' hiatus: the live album Live in Japan in 2004; the B-sides album The Glow Pt. 2 (Other Songs & Destroyed Versions) in 2007; the 7-inch "Don’t Smoke/Get Off the Internet" in 2007; an appearance on a collaborative single in 2011; and the 2016 compilation album Early Tapes, 1996–1998, made of selections from the early demos. In August 2020, Elverum returned to the Microphones name with the studio album Microphones in 2020, an autobiographical concept album consisting of one 44-minute song. The limited-copy album Foghorn Tape was released in March 2021, consisting of an ambient foghorn recording. In February 2022, Completely Everything, 1996–2021 was released, a compilation box set of the five Microphones studio albums, Early Tapes, and Song Islands. Elverum has stated that the box set is the end of the Microphones, which makes Microphones in 2020 the band's final studio album.

== Albums ==
=== Studio albums ===
List of studio albums, with selected details
Title	Album details
Don't Wake Me Up	Released: August 24, 1999; Labels: K Records, P.W. Elverum & Sun; Formats: LP, CD, digital download (See #Release history)
It Was Hot, We Stayed in the Water	Released: September 26, 2000; Labels: K Records, P.W. Elverum & Sun; Formats: LP, CD, digital download (See #Release history)
The Glow Pt. 2	Released: September 11, 2001; Labels: K Records, P.W. Elverum & Sun; Formats: LP, CD, digital download (See #Release history)
Mount Eerie	Released: January 21, 2003; Labels: 7.e.p, K Records, P.W. Elverum & Sun; Formats: LP, CD, digital download (See #Release history)
Microphones in 2020	Released: August 7, 2020; Labels: 7 e.p, P.W. Elverum & Sun; Formats: LP, CD, digital download

=== Miscellaneous albums ===
List of compilation, live, and demo albums, with selected details
Title	Description	Release details	Ref.
Microphone	Demo tape	Released: December 9, 1996; Label: Knw-Yr-Own; Format: Cassette	
Microphone Mix	Demo tape	Released: May 26, 1997; Labels: Knw-Yr-Own, Elsinor Records; Format: Cassette	
Wires & Cords	Demo tape	Released: November 9, 1997; Label: Knw-Yr-Own; Format: Cassette	
Tests (cassette version)	Demo tape	Released: March 9, 1998; Label: Knw-Yr-Own; Format: Cassette	
Tests (CD version)	Compilation demo album, made of selections from previous demos. First CD release.	Released: June 20, 1998; Label: Elsinor Records; Format: CD	
Blood	Limited-copy album; described by Pitchfork as "a collection of b-sides to singles that never existed".	Released: September 12, 2001; Label: St. Ives; Formats: Vinyl	
Song Islands	Compilation album of "singles and rarities"	Released: August 20, 2002; Label: K Records, P.W. Elverum & Sun; Formats: CD, Vinyl	
Little Bird Flies into a Big Black Cloud	Limited-copy album with stripped down, "intimate" music	Released: September 13, 2002; Label: St. Ives; Format: Vinyl	
Live in Japan, February 19th, 21st, and 22nd, 2003	Live album, recorded in 2003	Released: February 3, 2004; Labels: K Records, 7 e.p.; Formats: CD	
The Glow Pt. 2 (Other Songs & Destroyed Versions)	Compilation of extras from The Glow Pt. 2	Released: 2007, as part of a The Glow Pt. 2 reissue; Labels: K Records; Formats: CD, Vinyl	
Early Tapes, 1996–1998	Archival compilation album of selected tracks from the early cassette releases	Released: December 9, 2016; Label: P.W. Elverum & Sun; Format: Vinyl	
Foghorn Tape	Ambient tape loop of a foghorn recording. Elverum described it as "no songs, no music".	Released: March 5, 2021; Label: P.W. Elverum & Sun; Format: Vinyl	
Completely Everything, 1996–2021	Compilation box set of the 5 Microphones studio albums, Early Tapes, and Song Islands. Live recordings, the complete discography, stems, and outtakes are included digitally.	Released: February 25, 2022; Label: P.W. Elverum & Sun; Format: Vinyl, digital	

== Extended plays ==
List of extended plays, with selected details
Title	Release details	Ref.
Window:	Released: February 8, 2000; Label: YoYo Recordings; Format: CD	
The Singing from Mt. Eerie	Released: January 21, 2003; Label: K Records; Formats: CD, Vinyl	
The Drums from Mt. Eerie	Released: January 21, 2003; Label: K Records; Formats: CD, Vinyl	

== Singles ==
List of singles, with selected details
Title	Release details	Album	Ref.
"Bass Drum Dream"	Released: 1998; Label: Up Records; Format: 7" single	None originally; later included on Song Islands	
"Feedback (Life, Love, Loop)"	Released: 1999; Label: Bedtime Records; Format: 7" single	None originally; later included on Song Islands	
"Moon Moon"	Released: 1999; Label: K Records; Format: 7" single	None originally; later included on Song Islands	
"The Moon" (as Micro Phones)	Released: 2001; Label: Instatone Brand; Format: 7" single	The Glow Pt. 2	
"I Can't Believe You Actually Died" (as The Microphones' Singers)	Released: 2001; Label: Comin in Second; Format: 7" single	None originally; later included on Song Islands	
"Lanterns/Antlers" a.k.a. "Lanterns (Let Go Of Everything)"	Released: 2002; Label: K Records; Format: 7" single	Song Islands	
"Don’t Smoke/Get Off the Internet"	Released: March 1, 2007; Label: P.W. Elverum & Sun; Format: 7" single	—	
"I Lost My Wind" (Note: Was not released as a standalone single, but part of the collaborative 7" single, Collaborate with a 1940s Wire Recorder)	Released: 2011; Label: Various; Format: 7" single	Collaborate with a 1940s Wire Recorder	

== References and notes ==
=== Sources ===
- Baumgarten, Mark (2012). Love Rock Revolution: K Records and the Rise of Independent Music. Seattle: Sasquatch Books. ISBN 978-1-57061-822-2. OCLC 755697720.
- Ankeny, Jason (n.d.). "The Microphones Biography, Songs, & Albums". AllMusic.
- Gormely, Ian (November 5, 2018). "Microphones, Mount Eerie and Melancholy: The Career of Phil Elverum". Exclaim!. Archived from the original on November 16, 2018.
