= I Thought of You (album) =

Studio album by Julie Doiron
- Released: November 26, 2021
- Label: You've Changed Records

Julie Doiron chronology
Lost Wisdom pt. 2 (2019)	I Thought of You (2021)	Julie & Dany (2022)

I Thought of You is an album by Julie Doiron, released on November 26, 2021, on You've Changed Records. The album was Doiron's first full-length solo record since So Many Days in 2012, following a number of years of releasing EPs and working on collaborative projects such as Julie and the Wrong Guys and Mount Eerie.

Doiron's backing band on the album consists of Daniel Romano, Ian Romano and Dany Placard. The album includes several rerecorded versions of songs Doiron previously released on one-off singles or EPs, including "Cancel the Party" from the 2003 Julie Doiron / Okkervil River split EP, "Thought of You" and "Good Reason" from the Greville Tapes project, and "Ran" from the Hits with Tits compilation series.

The album was preceded by the preview single "You Gave Me the Key".

The album was longlisted for the 2022 Polaris Music Prize.

== Track listing ==
1. "You Gave Me the Key"
2. "Thought of You"
3. "Dreamed I Was"
4. "Just When I Thought"
5. "Et mon amour"
6. "Good Reason"
7. "Cancel the Party"
8. "How Can We"
9. "Darkness to Light"
10. "Ran"
11. "The Letters We Sent"
12. "They Wanted Me to Say"
13. "Back to the Water"
