= Darren McGinnis =

Canadian country music singer

- Origin: Sussex, New Brunswick
- Genres: Country
- Occupation: Singer
- Instrument: Vocals
- Years active: 2003–present
- Labels: AIM Music/Fontana North

Darren McGinnis (born in Sussex, New Brunswick) is a Canadian country music singer. He debuted in 2009 with the single "More Than Me". It was nominated at the 2010 Canadian Radio Music Awards for Country Song of the Year.

McGinnis' debut album, What's Your Story, was released on March 3, 2009, by AIM Music and distributed by Fontana North. It received three and a half stars from Bruce Leperre of the Winnipeg Free Press, who wrote that "McGinnis's strong writing and great vocals combine with Jason Barry's exquisite production to deliver an album that combines contemporary country with a rootsy feel." Leperre said that McGinnis "understands the importance of a good song" and compared him favorably to Keith Urban and Dierks Bentley, writing that his album "stands tall and proud right alongside either of those artists' offerings as well as anyone else making country music today."

McGinnis was one of eight artists selected to perform at the New Artist Showcase at the 2009 Canadian Country Music Association Awards. What's Your Story was nominated for a CCMA Award for Album Design of the Year, and his producer, Jason Barry, was nominated for Record Producer of the Year for his production on the album.

== Discography ==
=== Studio albums ===
Title	Album details
What's Your Story	Release date: March 3, 2009; Label: AIM Music/Fontana North; Formats: CD, music download

=== Singles ===
Year	Single	Album
2009	"More Than Me"	What's Your Story
2009	"Still Get to Me"	What's Your Story
2009	"I'll Find Me Another"	What's Your Story
