= Fontana North =

Canadian record distribution company

- Industry: Music & entertainment
- Genre: Various
- Predecessor: MapleNationwide
- Founded: 2006
- Headquarters: Toronto, Ontario, Canada
- Services: Distribution, production, warehousing, marketing, sales, brand partnerships, merchandising, finance, back office
- Parent: Cadence Music Group; Virgin Music Group
- Website: FontanaNorth.com

Fontana North is a Canadian record distribution company and represents the Canadian wing of the Virgin Music Group. Its name is derived from the defunct Fontana Distribution. It began as a joint venture between Canadian-based Cadence Music Group and US-based Fontana Distribution. The company was established by MapleCore in 2004 as MapleNationwide, and in 2006, it partnered with Fontana Distribution and was rebranded as Fontana North. It has expanded throughout Canada for pan-Canadian distribution of many music labels. On August 22, 2013, it was announced that they would be teaming up with Distort Entertainment in a joint venture deal with Fontana North acting as the main distributor of the hardcore label.

Fontana North won the Independent Distributor of the Year award six years in a row (2008 - 2013) at the Canadian Music Industry Awards, held annually in Toronto as part of Canadian Music Week.

In 2019, following Universal Music Group's acquisition of Fontana Distribution's owner, Ingrooves, Fontana returned to UMG. A year later, Fontana was folded into Caroline Distribution, acquired in 2013 via Universal's purchase of EMI, which, another year later, was rebranded as Virgin Music Label & Artist Services, later Virgin Music. That merged into Virgin Music Group in 2023.

== Distributed labels ==
Fontana North is affiliated with more than 80 labels, including the following:

- 2+2 Management
- AAO Music
- Alligator Records
- Astral Music
- ATO Records
- Bad Taste Records
- Black Box Recordings
- Black Hen Music
- Bumstead Productions
- Cobraside Distribution
- Cooperative Music
- Cordova Bay Records
- Dangerbird Records
- Distort Entertainment
- Downtown Records
- Daptone Records
- Domo Records
- Drive Records
- Drip Audio
- Eleven Seven Music
- Epitaph Records
- Endearing Records
- Fearless Records
- Fierce Panda Canada
- Filter Records
- Half-Life Records
- Heads Connect Entertainment
- Hieroglyphics
- High Tide Music
- Hopeless Records
- High 4 Records
- Hype-R Music Group
- Hype Rated Music // HR Recordings Co
- Hi-Bias Recordings
- Indica Records
- Ipecac Recordings
- j.k. livin' Records
- Latent Recordings
- Lex Records
- Luaka Bop
- Mad Decent
- Mailboat Records
- Make It Real Records
- MapleMusic Recordings
- Masalacism Records
- MB3 Records
- Ministry of Sound
- Modular Records
- Mom + Pop Music
- Mr Bongo Records
- Musical Freedom
- Metal Blade Records
- Napalm Records
- Nevado Records
- Nuclear Blast
- Palm Pictures
- Paper Bag Records
- PH Recordings
- Pheromone Recordings
- PHI Grou
- PIAS Recordings
- Pipe & Hat
- Play Records
- Polar Bear Records
- Rainbow Quartz
- Rasa Music
- RBC Records
- Red Floor Records
- Red Telephone Box Records
- Rekords Rekords
- Rhymesayers Entertainment
- Rise Records
- Rocket Science Records
- Road Angel Records
- Salt X Records
- Sandbag Records
- Sumerian Records
- Shangri-La Records
- SideOneDummy Records
- Shoreline Entertainment
- Slaight Music
- Sonic Unyon Distribution
- Song Dog Music
- Sound of Pop
- Soul Kiss Entertainment
- Strange Music
- System Recordings
- TBD Records
- Tee Pee Records
- Tompkins Square Records
- Tonic Records
- Turtlemusik
- Upper Class Recordings
- Underground Operations
- URBNET Records
- Victory Records
- ViiiZUALEYES Media Group & Recordings Inc
- Vagrant Records
- VMG RECORDINGS
- VH1 Classics
- Warp Records
- Warcon Enterprises
- William Morris Endeavor
- Wrasse Records
- Yazoo Record Group
- YYZ Records

Some labels listed here have only selected titles distributed through Fontana North.

== Direct-distribution artists ==
A small selection of artists are technically "unsigned", but distribute their records independently through Fontana North, including:

- Donovan Woods
- Jeremy Dutcher
- Jordan Klassen
- Kam Speech
- Lindi Ortega
- Snotty Nose Rez Kids

== Awards and accolades ==
=== Canadian Music Awards ===
The Canadian Music and Broadcast Industry Awards happen every March in Toronto as part of Canadian Music Week.

Year	Nominee / work	Award	Result
2008	Fontana North	Independent Distributor of the Year	Won
2009	Fontana North	Independent Distributor of the Year	Won
2010	Fontana North	Independent Distributor of the Year	Won
2011	Fontana North	Independent Distributor of the Year	Won
2012	Fontana North	Independent Distributor of the Year	Won
2013	Fontana North	Independent Distributor of the Year	Won

=== Juno Awards ===
The Juno Awards are presented by the Canadian Academy of Recording Arts and Sciences.

Year	Nominee / work	Award	Result
2007	Neverending White Lights	New Artist of the Year	Nominated
2007	Arabesque The Frenzy Of Renown	Rap Recording of the Year	Nominated
2007	Classified Hitch Hikin’ Music	Rap Recording of the Year	Nominated
2007	DL Incognito Organic Music For A Digital World	Rap Recording of the Year	Nominated
2007	Lori Cullen Calling For Rain	Vocal Jazz Album of the Year	Nominated
2007	George Believe	R&B/Soul Recording of the Year	Nominated
2007	Karl Wolf Face Behind The Face	R&B/Soul Recording of the Year	Nominated
2007	Lennie Gallant When We Get There	Roots & Traditional Album of the Year: Solo	Nominated
2007	David Gogo Acoustic	Blues Album of the Year	Nominated
2008	Shad The Old Prince	Rap Recording of the Year	Nominated
2008	Bob Lanois Snake Road	Instrumental Album of the Year	Nominated
2009	Inhabitants The Furniture Moves Underneath	Instrumental Album of the Year	Nominated
2009	Steve Dawson Telescope	Instrumental Album of the Year	Nominated
2009	D-Sisive The Book	Rap Recording of the Year	Nominated
2009	DL Incognito A Captured Moment In Time	Rap Recording of the Year	Nominated
2009	Old Man Luedecke Proof Of Love	Roots & Traditional Album of the Year: Solo	Won
2009	Daniel Lanois	Jack Richardson Producer of the Year	Won
2009	Daniel Lanois Here Is What Is	Music DVD of the Year	Nominated
2010	Carly Rae Jepsen	New Artist of the Year	Nominated
2010	Carly Rae Jepsen & Ryan Stewart	Songwriter of the Year	Nominated
2010	Danny Fernandes	New Artist of the Year	Nominated
2010	Ten Second Epic	New Group of the Year	Nominated
2010	Julie Doiron I Can Wonder What You Did With Your Day	Alternative Album of the Year	Nominated
2010	Pavlo, Rik Emmett, Oscar Lopez Trifecta	Instrumental Album of the Year	Nominated
2010	Danny Fernandes INTRO	R&B/Soul Album of the Year	Nominated
2010	Bahamas Pink Strat	Roots & Traditional Album of the Year: Solo	Nominated
2010	John Wort Hannam Queen's Hotel	Roots & Traditional Album of the Year: Solo	Nominated
2010	Good Lovelies Good Lovelies	Roots & Traditional Album of the Year: Group	Won
2010	Matt Brouwer Where's Our Revolution	Contemporary Christian/Gospel Album of the Year	Won
2011	Fond of Tigers Continent & Western	Instrumental Album of the Year	Won
2011	D-Sisive Vaudeville	Rap Recording of the Year	Nominated
2011	Shad TSOL	Rap Recording of the Year	Won
2011	Raghav ft. Kardinal Offishall So Much	R&B/Soul Recording of the Year	Nominated
2011	Dubmatix System Shakedown	Reggae Recording of the Year	Nominated
2011	Joey Stylez The Black Star	Aboriginal Album of the Year	Nominated
2011	Old Man Luedecke My Hands Are On Fire and Other Love Songs	Roots & Traditional Album of the Year: Solo	Won
2011	Jim Byrnes Everywhere West	Blues Album of the Year	Won
2011	Greg Sczebel Love & the Lack Thereof	Contemporary Christian/Gospel Album of the Year	Won
2011	Manafest The Chase	Contemporary Christian/Gospel Album of the Year	Nominated
2012	JRDN	New Artist of the Year	Nominated
2012	JRDN IAMJRDN	R&B/Soul Recording of the Year	Nominated
2012	The Rural Alberta Advantage	New Group of the Year	Nominated
2012	The Rural Alberta Advantage Stamp	Video of the Year	Nominated
2012	Jimmy Rankin Forget About the World	Country Album of the Year	Nominated
2012	Cuff The Duke Morning Comes	Adult Alternative Album of the Year	Nominated
2012	Bobs & Lolo Connecting the Dots	Children's Album of the Year	Nominated
2012	D-Sisive Jonestown 2: Jimmy Go Bye Bye	Rap Recording of the Year	Nominated
2012	Dubmatix Seeds of Love & Life ft. Luciano	Reggae Recording of the Year	Nominated
2012	Dave Gunning A Tribute To John Allan Cameron	Roots & Traditional Album of the Year: Solo	Nominated
2012	David Gogo Soul-Bender	Blues Album of the Year	Nominated
2012	Austra Feel It Break	Electronic Album of the Year	Nominated
2013	Ex Dio Caligvla	Metal/Hard Music Album of the Year: Group	Nominated
2013	Manafest Fighter	Contemporary Christian/Gospel Album of the Year	Nominated
2013	The Wooden Sky Every Child A Daughter, Every Moon A Sun	Roots & Traditional Album of the Year: Group	Nominated
2013	The Strumbellas My Father and the Hunter	Roots & Traditional Album of the Year: Group	Nominated
2013	Elliot BROOD Days Into Years	Roots & Traditional Album of the Year: Group	Won
2013	Crystal Shawanda Just Like You	Aboriginal Album of the Year	Won
2013	Ratchet Orchestra Hemlock	Instrumental Album of the Year	Nominated
2013	Kristina Maria Tell The World	Pop Album of the Year	Nominated
