= Désormais =

Studio album by Julie Doiron
- Released: 2001
- Genre: Indie rock
- Length: 30:58
- Label: Jagjaguwar (US); Endearing (Canada)

Julie Doiron chronology
Julie Doiron and the Wooden Stars (1999)	Désormais (2001)	Heart and Crime (2002)

Professional ratings
Review scores
Source	Rating
Pitchfork Media	8/10

Désormais is an album by Julie Doiron, released in 2001. It is her first, and to date only, album of French language material. "Désormais" translates to English as "Henceforth".

== Track listing ==
1. "Ce charmant coeur (This Charming Heart)" - 2:15
2. "La Jeune amoureuse (The Young Lovers)" - 3:21
3. "Faites de beaux rêves (Sweet Dreams)" - 1:57
4. "Don't Ask" - 3:28
5. "Le Piano (The Piano)" - 4:32
6. "Tu es malade (You Are Sick)" - 3:02
7. "Au contraire (On the Contrary)” - 3:11
8. "Pour toujours (Forever)" - 4:56
9. "Penses-donc (Tu es seule) (Do You Think (You Are Alone))" - 1:54
10. "Faites de beaux rêves (Sweet Dreams)" - 02:16
