= Woke Myself Up =

Studio album by Julie Doiron
- Released: January 23, 2007
- Genre: Indie rock
- Length: 29:57
- Label: Jagjaguwar, Endearing
- Producer: Rick White

Julie Doiron chronology
Goodnight Nobody (2004)	Woke Myself Up (2007)	Lost Wisdom (2008)

Woke Myself Up is an album by Julie Doiron, released in 2007.

Doiron's former Eric's Trip bandmate Rick White produced and played on the album. Three songs on the album — "I Woke Myself Up", "No More" and "The Wrong Guy" — also include contributions by Mark Gaudet and Chris Thompson, the other two former members of Eric's Trip. This was the first time the four musicians released new material together since the breakup of Eric's Trip in 1996, although they have performed together on stage a number of times.

The album artwork was created by Julie's friend, artist and animator Tara Wells of Sackville, New Brunswick, who also created the video for "Swan Pond".

== Reception ==
Professional ratings
Aggregate scores
Source	Rating
Metacritic	75/100
Review scores
Source	Rating
Pitchfork Media	6.5/10
The Wheel's Still in Spin	

Woke Myself Up was shortlisted for the 2007 Polaris Music Prize, alongside such other acts as Arcade Fire, The Besnard Lakes and Joel Plaskett Emergency.

Woke Myself Up also topped the !earshot campus/community radio Top 50 for 2007.

== Track listing ==
1. "I Woke Myself Up" - 2:45
2. "You Look So Alive" - 1:46
3. "Swan Pond" - 2:25
4. "Yer Kids" - 2:33
5. "I Left Town" - 2:42
6. "No More" - 2:15
7. "Don't Wanna Be / Liked by You" - 2:53
8. "Dark Horse" - 3:22
9. "The Wrong Guy" - 3:36
10. "Me and My Friend" - 2:46
11. "untitled" - 2:54
