= Aaron Leaney =

Canadian saxophonist and composer

Aaron Leaney is a Canadian saxophonist and composer.

== Biography ==
Aaron Leaney is a Canadian saxophonist. He graduated from Humber College in Toronto, Ontario, where he studied with Pat LaBarbera. He co-leads the trio Hii Regions (formed in 2021 featuring bassist/composer and leader of the Ratchet Orchestra Nicolas Caloia and Kalmunity founder/drummer Jahsun, which concentrates on developing free form melodic, afro-caribbean rhythmic textural improvisations. As well, the longstanding Aaron Leaney & Chris Dadge Duo, that follows a long duo tradition developed by artists such as Don Cherry & Ed Blackwell, Anthony Braxton & Max Roach, Evan Parker & Paul Lytton, Peter Brötzmann & Han Bennik, and most prominently the duo of John Coltrane & Rashied Ali.

At the end of 2005, he began performing with the Toronto alternative rock group, The Postage Stamps featuring Beams drummer Mike Duffield, Pitter Patter founder Keith Hamilton, Dwayne Gretzky keyboardist Simeon Abbott, guitarists Jordan Walsh, & Steve Eccles. Mid-2006, they recorded a full-length record This Ugly Arrangement. Although the music was completely written prior to the recording session, the saxophone/clarinet parts were improvised and recorded live off the floor at Hotel2Tango.

His sax/bass/drums trio, the Aaron Leaney Three had their first self-titled independent record released in January 2008. Leaney also leads the electro-acoustic trio, Bord À Bord whose debut record was nominated for the 2015 GAMIQ award for best Experimental Album of the year in Quebec. Most recently, Leaney leads a world-free-jazz duo project featuring the 1967, co-founder of Le Quatuor de jazz libre du Québec elder drummer, Guy Thouin, their debut vinyl record Lockdown, recorded over chance meetings during the pandemic, is set for release fall 2022 on Astral Spirits Records.

== Discography ==
As a leader:

- 2023 - Lockdown featuring Guy Thouin (Astral Spirits Records)
- 2014 - Bord À Bord (SSM-004)
- 2010 - Aaron Leaney/Chris Dadge - Continuity (bim-42)
- 2008 - Aaron Leaney Three (SOCAN)
- 2006 - Aaron Leaney/Chris Dadge - Duo (Bir-Four)
- 2005 - Alive From CJSW - (CJSWAOK)

As a sideman:

- 2007 - This Ugly Arrangement The Postage Stamps (Recorded at Hotel2Tango by Howard Bilerman)

As a producer:

- 2009 - "the localization of noise and its endowment with form" Lamb Chops (Colin Fisher & Simon Abbott) (bim-24)
