= I Like to Dance =

I Like to Dance may refer to:

- "I Like to Dance", a song by Hot Chelle Rae from Lovesick Electric
- "I Like to Dance", a song by Quakers from Quakers
- "I Like to Dance", a song by Abu Talib
- "I Like to Dance", a song by Alex the Astronaut
- "I Like to Dance", a song by Edo Maajka
- "I Like to Dance", a song by Shirley & Company
- "I Like to Dance", a song from Yo Gabba Gabba!

== See also ==
- I Love to Dance (disambiguation)
