= Will You Still Love Me? =

Will You Still Love Me? may refer to:

- "Will You Still Love Me?" (song), a 1986 song by Chicago
- Will You Still Love Me? (EP), a 1999 EP by Julie Doiron

== See also ==
- "Will You Love Me Tomorrow"
