= Goodnight Nobody =

Studio album by Julie Doiron
- Released: 2004
- Genre: Indie rock
- Length: 41:22
- Label: Jagjaguwar (US); Endearing (Canada)

Julie Doiron chronology
Julie Doiron / Okkervil River (2003)	Goodnight Nobody (2004)	Woke Myself Up (2007)

Professional ratings
Review scores
Source	Rating
Pitchfork Media	7.4/10

Goodnight Nobody is an album by Julie Doiron, released in 2004.

== Track listing ==
1. "Snowfalls in November" – 5:18
2. "Sorry Part III" – 2:31
3. "Last Night" – 3:07
4. "No Moneymakers" – 3:40
5. "Tonight Is No Night" – 1:27
6. "Dirty Feet" – 3:17
7. "Dance All Night" – 3:22
8. "When I Awoke" – 3:05
9. "The Songwriter" – 4:43
10. "Some Blues" – 3:48
11. "Banjo" – 3:38
12. "Good Night" – 3:00
