= Modern Pressure =

Studio album by Daniel Romano
- Released: May 19, 2017
- Length: 38:51
- Label: You've Changed; New West

Daniel Romano chronology
Ancient Shapes (2016)	Modern Pressure (2017)	Human Touch (2018)

Professional ratings
Aggregate scores
Source	Rating
Metacritic	70/100
Review scores
Source	Rating
AllMusic	3.5/5 stars
Exclaim!	8/10
PopMatters	7/10

Modern Pressure is the eighth studio album by Canadian singer-songwriter Daniel Romano. It was released on May 19, 2017 through You've Changed Records in Canada and New West Records in the United States.

== Track listing ==
No.	Title	Length
1.	"Ugly Human Heart, Pt. 1"	1:59
2.	"Modern Pressure"	3:54
3.	"Roya"	3:17
4.	"The Pride of Queens"	4:49
5.	"When I Learned Your Name"	2:23
6.	"Sucking the Old World Dry"	2:03
7.	"Ugly Human Heart, Pt. 2"	1:58
8.	"Impossible Green"	3:48
9.	"Jennifer Castle"	5:18
10.	"Dancing With the Lady in the Moon"	2:24
11.	"I Tried to Hold the World (In My Mouth)"	3:49
12.	"What's to Become of the Meaning of Love"	3:09

== Charts ==
Chart	Peak position
Dutch Albums (Album Top 100)	183
