= Loneliest in the Morning =

Studio album by Julie Doiron
- Released: September 1997
- Genre: Indie rock
- Length: 35:17
- Label: Sub Pop

Julie Doiron chronology
Broken Girl (1996)	Loneliest in the Morning (1997)	Will You Still Love Me? (1999)

Professional ratings
Review scores
Source	Rating
AllMusic	4/5 stars
Edmonton Journal	3/5 stars
Pitchfork Media	6.3/10

Loneliest in the Morning is an album by the Canadian musician Julie Doiron, released in 1997.

== Critical reception ==
The Edmonton Journal called the album "a languid, meandering—but very pretty—acoustic collection."

AllMusic wrote that "the guitar provides the subtle rhythm, while Doiron's voice is captivating and enchanting." Exclaim! thought that although the songs "are little more than Doiron's soft voice and guitar, they're fascinating and delicately beautiful."

== Track listing ==
1. "So Fast" - 2:09
2. "Dance Me" - 2:52
3. "Sorry Part I" - 2:17
4. "Tell You Again" - 2:23
5. "Explain" - 2:13
6. "Crying Baby" - 2:10
7. "Sweeter" - 1:34
8. "Tonight, We Sleep" - 3:28
9. "Mother" - 2:30
10. "Love to Annoy" - 2:37
11. "Creative Depression" - 2:27
12. "Sorry, Part II" - 2:51
13. "Condescending You" - 2:59
14. "Le Soleil" - 2:45
