= Smart Went Crazy =

American rock band

- Origin: Washington DC, United States
- Genres: Post-hardcore, indie rock, rock
- Years active: 1993–1998
- Label: Dischord
- Past members: Chad Clark; Abram Goodrich; Hilary Soldati; Jeff Boswell; Tony Dennison; Devin Ocampo

Smart Went Crazy was an American rock band from Washington, D.C.

== History ==
Smart Went Crazy was formed by high school students Chad Clark (guitar and vocals), Abram Goodrich (bass) and Hilary Soldati (cello and vocals). Following graduation the band expanded to include Jeff Boswell (guitar) and Tony Dennison (drums). Smart Went Crazy released their debut, Cubbyhole EP, in 1994. This was independently released through their own label, CozyDisc. By 1995 they had developed a relationship with Dischord Records and released their first full-length album Now We're Even in 1995.

After three U.S. tours in support of, and following, Now We're Even, and with the replacement of drummer Tony Dennison with Devin Ocampo, they released their follow-up album, Con Art, in 1997. Shortly after the album's release and due to increasing division in the band, Smart Went Crazy disbanded in 1998.

After the breakup, several members went on to join other bands: Faraquet (Jeff Boswell, Devin Ocampo), The Caribbean (Tony Dennison), and Beauty Pill (Chad Clark, Abram Goodrich and Ocampo).

=== Recognition ===
The second and final album Con Art was selected for Pitchfork's Best Albums of the 1990s list.

== Discography ==
=== Studio albums ===
- Now We're Even (Dischord, 1995)
- Con Art (Dischord, 1997)

=== Extended plays ===
- Cubbyhole (Cozy Disc, 1994)
