= People Are Different =

Studio album by Wooden Stars
- Released: April 10, 2007
- Genre: Indie rock
- Label: Sonic Unyon

Wooden Stars chronology
Julie Doiron and the Wooden Stars (1999)	People Are Different (2007)

Professional ratings
Review scores
Source	Rating
Musicemissions	Link
Aversion	Link

People Are Different is an album by Canadian indie rock band Wooden Stars, released in 2007 on Sonic Unyon. It is the band's first new album since 1999's Julie Doiron and the Wooden Stars.

== Track listing ==
1. "Orphans"
2. "Pretty Girl"
3. "Blackouts"
4. "Microphone"
5. "Gold Dust"
6. "Boating Accident"
7. "Last Secret Infirmary"
8. "Clouds"
