= Daniel, Fred & Julie =

Studio album by Daniel Romano, Frederick Squire and Julie Doiron
- Released: December 1, 2009
- Genres: Country, folk
- Label: You've Changed

Julie Doiron chronology
I Can Wonder What You Did with Your Day (2009)	Daniel, Fred & Julie (2009)	So Many Days (2012)

Frederick Squire chronology
Lost Wisdom (2008)	Daniel, Fred & Julie (2009)	March 12 (2010)

Daniel Romano chronology
Years (by One Thousand Fingertips) (2009)	Daniel, Fred & Julie (2009)	Workin' for the Music Man (2010)

Daniel, Fred & Julie is an album by Canadian musicians Daniel Romano, Frederick Squire and Julie Doiron, released December 1, 2009 on You've Changed Records.

The album consists predominantly of traditional folk songs, with the exception of two original songs written by Romano. It was recorded in the garage of Squire's home over the summer of 2009. "Down by the Weeping Willow" is a version of the folk song commonly known as "Jealous Lover".

== Track listing ==
1. "The Gambler and His Bride" (7:12)
2. "Runner" (3:46)
3. "I Dream of Jeanie" (3:11)
4. "No One Knew My Name" (1:54)
5. "Hallelujah, I'm a Bum" (2:56)
6. "Down by the Weeping Willow" (4:14)
7. "Bonny Black Bess" (3:55)
8. "Clementine" (3:42)
9. "Your Love" (4:08)
10. "Johnny Sands" (1:31)
