= Adam and the Amethysts =

Canadian indie rock band

- Origin: Montreal, Quebec, Canada
- Genres: Indie, psychedelic
- Years active: 2004–2012
- Labels: Pome, Kelp
- Members: Adam Waito; Rebecca Lessard; Scott Johnson Gailey; Jordan Robson-Cramer; Keiko Devaux; Rory Seydel; Katherine Peacock; Jessie Stein; Nathan Ward
- Website: adamandtheamethysts.com

Adam and the Amethysts was a Canadian indie rock band formed in Montreal in 2004. The band was fronted by Adam Waito, a former member of Miracle Fortress. The band released two albums and toured mostly around North America.

== History ==
Waito was born in Manitouwadge, Ontario, raised in Thunder Bay, Ontario and moved to Montreal in the early 2000s. He co-founded Telefauna in 2004, an indie-pop band whose that played the Pop Montreal festival three times. They released Their 1st EP in 2005 and a single "Under the Underground Water" b/w "Bamboo Shoot" in 2007.

Waito launched Adam and the Amethysts with the release of Amethyst Amulet on 10 June 2008, on Pome Records. The album was an ode to Waito's home town, referencing 60s pop and Neil Young. For this album, it was reported that guest artists included members of Telefauna and The Luyas, but they are not credited.

After the release of Amethyst Amulet the band underwent some lineup changes while continuing to play festivals like Pop Montreal, and Halifax Pop Explosion. They also opened for Land of Talk.

The band's second album, Flickering Flashlight, was released on 4 October 2011, on Kelp Records. The song "Prophecy" from this album was featured on the soundtrack of Curfew, which won the 2012 Academy Award for Best Live Action Short Film. The band, now a trio, went on a short Canadian tour. In 2012, they played Canadian Music Week and the South by Southwest festival in Texas.

In 2013, Lessard and Waito formed the duo Silverkeys. In 2014, Waito joined Ohara Hale and Jeremy MacCuish to form the trio Nancy Pants, who released two LPs together.

Beginning in 2013, Waito began composing music for film: first the short documentary To the Beat of Beverly School, and later Cristián Jiménez's feature film La voz en off (Voice Over). In 2013, the Adam and the Amethysts song "Dreaming" appeared on the soundtrack to the films What If, starring Daniel Radcliffe, and the Oscar-winning short Curfew.

In 2024, Waito debuted an ambient electronic project called Sparkling Water, which uses vintage and modern synthesizers and "draws inspiration from 80s library music, New Age experimentalism, and nostalgic deep house." Several of his releases were used as fundraisers in support of Palestinian victims of the war in Gaza.

== Discography ==
- 2008: Amethyst Amulet (Pome)
- 2011: Flickering Flashlight (Kelp)
