= Heart and Crime =

Studio album by Julie Doiron
- Released: 2002
- Genre: Indie rock
- Length: 40:24
- Label: Jagjaguwar (US); Endearing (Canada)

Julie Doiron chronology
Désormais (2001)	Heart and Crime (2002)	Julie Doiron / Okkervil River (2003)

Professional ratings
Review scores
Source	Rating
AllMusic	3.5/5 stars
Now	2/5 stars
Pitchfork	7.6/10

Heart and Crime is an album by Julie Doiron, released in 2002.

== Track listing ==
1. "Wintermitts" - 4:10
2. "Too Much" - 3:21
3. "Shivers + Crickets" - 2:48
4. "All Their Broken Hearts" - 3:43
5. "Sending the Photographs" - 4:18
6. "I Broke His Heart" - 2:47
7. "The Surgery Is Over" - 3:17
8. "Who Will Be the One" - 2:42
9. "The One You Love" - 2:49
10. "I Love to Dance" - 3:12
11. "It's OK to Stare" - 2:35
12. "Oh These Walls" - 4:42
