= Julie & Dany =

Studio album by Julie Doiron and Dany Placard
- Released: April 29, 2022
- Length: 30:55
- Label: Simone Records

Julie Doiron chronology
I Thought of You (2021)	Julie & Dany (2022)

Dany Placard chronology
Astronomie (suite) (2021)	Julie & Dany (2022)	Avoir su (2024)

Julie & Dany is a collaborative studio album by Canadian singer-songwriters Julie Doiron and Dany Placard, released by Simone Records on April 29, 2022.

The album was recorded during COVID-19 lockdowns in either their home in Memramcook, New Brunswick, or between houses in New Brunswick and Quebec.

Julie & Dany received a rating of 6.9 out of 10 in a review by Linnie Greene of Pitchfork. It was nominated for Rock Recording of the Year in the East Coast Music Awards.

== Background ==
Prior to the release of Julie & Dany, Doiron and Placard met in 2018. They entered a romantic relationship a number of months after Doiron bought Placard's album Full Face and wrote him to tell him she bought it. Placard's album became one of Doiron's inspirations for her 2021 album I Thought of You, which he had also featured on.

== Track listing ==
1. "Dégèle" – 2:40
2. "What If I Said" – 2:57
3. "Lying" – 3:16
4. "Tomate" – 1:49
5. "Back to the Water" – 2:23
6. "Mayo" – 3:08
7. "I Remember Being Home" – 3:19
8. "Too Late" – 2:49
9. "Jean-Talon Market" – 3:15
10. "Vénus" – 3:19
11. "My Brain" – 1:55
