= Steve Lambke =

Canadian singer-songwriter

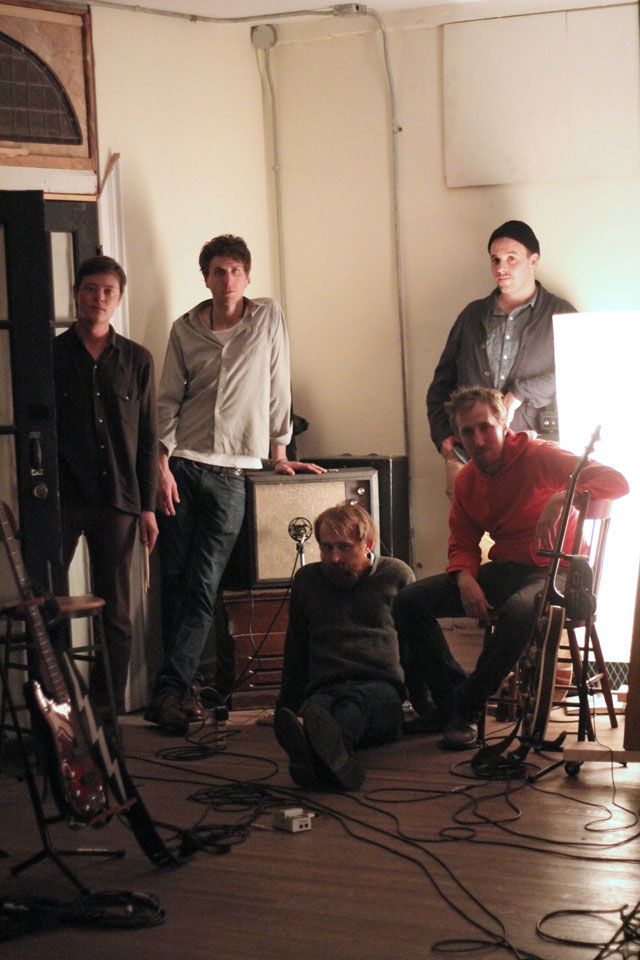
- Baby Eagle and the Proud Mothers at 6 Nassau St., Toronto, November 2011. Ian Kehoe, Will Kidman, Spencer Burton, Nick Ferrio, Steven Lambke

Background information
- Also known as: Baby Eagle
- Born: Steven Lambke; Cambridge, Ontario, Canada
- Origin: Guelph, Ontario, Canada
- Genres: Indie rock, folk rock
- Occupation: Singer-songwriter
- Instruments: Guitar, vocals, keyboards, harmonica
- Years active: 1999–present
- Labels: Outside Music; You've Changed
- Website: http://youvechangedrecords.com

Steve Lambke is a Canadian singer-songwriter. He is a vocalist and guitarist for the indie rock band Constantines, and formerly released solo material under the name Baby Eagle.

== Biography ==
Lambke grew up in Cambridge, Ontario, where he played with fellow Constantine Dallas Wehrle in a band called Captain Co-Pilot in the late 1990s. He moved to Guelph in 1997 to attend school at the University of Guelph and earned a Bachelor of Science in physics. Lambke and Wehrle joined two former members of Shoulder in 1999 to form the Constantines.

Lambke released his first solo album, Baby Eagle, in 2006 on Outside Music. The album was recorded in Winnipeg, Manitoba, and includes contributions from John K. Samson and Christine Fellows. A second album, No Blues, was recorded in Sackville, New Brunswick, with contributions from Julie Doiron and Shotgun & Jaybird, and was released in 2007 on Outside Music. The album, Dog Weather was released in 2010 on Lambke's own You've Changed Records and received strong reviews all around. The album includes collaborations with Daniel Romano of Attack in Black, Shotgun Jimmie as well as David Trenaman and Colleen Collins of Construction & Destruction.

The album Bone Soldiers was released by You've Changed Records on March 6, 2012. The album is credited to Baby Eagle and the Proud Mothers, and has a noisier, more punk-influenced sound than previous recordings. The Proud Mothers are Lambke's fellow Constantine Will Kidman, Ian Kehoe, Spencer Burton, and Nick Ferrio.

Lambke currently lives in Toronto, where he continues to write, record and perform. He co-owns and operates You've Changed Records along with Daniel Romano.

He was a nominee for the 2013 SOCAN Songwriting Prize for "Mule in the Flowers", a song he cowrote with Tamara Lindeman of The Weather Station.

== Discography ==
- Baby Eagle (2006)
- No Blues (2007)
- Dog Weather (2010)
- Bone Soldiers (2012)
- Days of Heaven (2015)
- Dark Blue (2019)
- Volcano Volcano (2022)

=== With Daniel Romano as Spider Bite ===
- Spider Bite (2020)
- The Rainbow and The Dove (2023)
