= I Love to Dance (disambiguation) =

I Love to Dance is the debut album by Kleeer

I Love to Dance may also refer to:

- "I Love to Dance", a song by Julie Doiron from Heart and Crime
- "I Love to Dance", a song by Datura
- "I Love to Dance", a song by Jaromír Vejvoda
- "I Love to Dance", a song by Voggue
- "I Love to Dance", a song from the soundtrack of Ballroom, performed by Dorothy Loudon and Vincent Gardenia
- "I Love to Dance", a song from the soundtrack of This Time for Keeps
- "I Love to Dance", a song from the soundtrack of The Hard Way (1943 film)
- "I Love to Dance (But Never on Sunday)", a song by Eydie Gormé

== See also ==
- I Like to Dance (disambiguation)
