= Dany Placard =

Canadian singer-songwriter (born 1977)

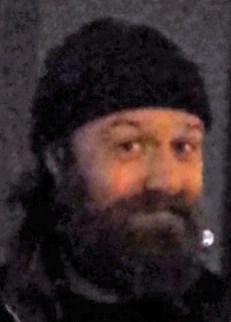
A grainy image of Dany Placard

Dany Placard is the stage name of Dany Gauthier (born 1977), a Canadian singer-songwriter from Laterrière, Quebec.

After studying music at the Université du Québec à Montréal, Placard independently released his debut album L'Agent Placard in 1998. He then formed the band Plywood 3/4, with whom he released two albums, before returning to a solo career with the 2005 album Rang de l'église. He won the Canadian Folk Music Award for Francophone Songwriter of the Year at the 9th Canadian Folk Music Awards in 2013 for his album Démon vert, and was a nominee in the same category at the 11th Canadian Folk Music Awards in 2015 for Santa Maria.

He played the title character in the 2015 short film Blue Thunder (Bleu tonnerre), and performed music for the soundtrack.

His 2020 album J'connais rien à l'astronomie and the 2021 followup EP Astronomie (suite) feature contributions from singer-songwriter Julie Doiron. Placard in turn appears on Doiron's 2021 album I Thought of You. In early 2022, Placard and Doiron announced that a collaborative album, Julie & Dany, would be released in April 2022.

== Discography ==
- L'Agent Placard - 1998
- Rang de l'église - 2005
- Raccourci - 2008
- Placard - 2010
- Démon vert - 2012
- Santa Maria - 2014
- Full Face - 2017
- J'connais rien à l'astronomie - 2020
- Astronomie (suite) - 2021
- Julie & Dany - 2022, with Julie Doiron
