= I Can Wonder What You Did with Your Day =

I Can Wonder What You Did With Your Day

Studio album by Julie Doiron
- Released: March 10, 2009
- Genre: Indie rock
- Label: Jagjaguwar (US); Endearing (Canada)
- Producer: Rick White

Julie Doiron chronology
Lost Wisdom (2008)	I Can Wonder What You Did With Your Day (2009)	Daniel, Fred & Julie (2009)

Professional ratings
Aggregate scores
Source	Rating
Metacritic	71/100
Review scores
Source	Rating
AllMusic	3.5/5 stars

I Can Wonder What You Did with Your Day is an album by Julie Doiron, released on March 10, 2009.

Recorded at the home studio of Rick White, the album's producer and Doiron's onetime bandmate in Eric's Trip, the album is more rock-oriented than Doiron's other solo albums, revisiting the sound and style of Eric's Trip.

The album's first single, "Consolation Prize", was released to radio in early February.

Alternate versions of the songs "Heavy Snow" and "Nice to Come Home" were released on a split 7-inch single in May 2009. The single's other side featured the only two songs ever released by Calm Down It's Monday, a band which consisted of Doiron and Frederick Squire.

"The Life of Dreams" appeared in an iPhone commercial in July 2014.

== Track listing ==
All songs written by Julie Doiron, except "Spill Yer Lungs" and "Blue" by Frederick Squire.

1. "Life of Dreams"
2. "Spill Yer Lungs"
3. "Lovers of the World"
4. "Tailor"
5. "Heavy Snow"
6. "Nice to Come Home"
7. "Consolation Prize"
8. "Je le savais"
9. "When Brakes Get Wet"
10. "Borrowed Minivans"
11. "Blue"
12. "Glad to Be Alive"
