= Julie Doiron and the Wooden Stars =

Studio album by Julie Doiron and the Wooden Stars
- Released: 1999
- Genre: Indie rock
- Length: 42:47
- Label: Sappy Records; Tree Records

Julie Doiron chronology
Will You Still Love Me? (1999)	Julie Doiron and the Wooden Stars (1999)	Désormais (2001)

Wooden Stars chronology
The Moon (1999)	Julie Doiron and the Wooden Stars (1999)	People Are Different (2007)

Professional ratings
Review scores
Source	Rating
AllMusic	4/5 stars
Pitchfork Media	6.8/10

Julie Doiron and the Wooden Stars is an album by Julie Doiron in collaboration with the indie rock band Wooden Stars, released in 1999. It represented the first time that Doiron had collaborated with a band since the end of Eric's Trip.

The album won the Juno Award for Alternative Album of the Year, in 2000.

== Critical reception ==
The Cleveland Scene called the album "a minor masterpiece, filled with brooding melancholy that stops just short of being morose."

== Track listing ==
No.	Title	Length
1.	"The Last Time"	3:03
2.	"Gone Gone"	4:42
3.	"The Longest Winter"	2:59
4.	"The Best Thing for Me"	4:17
5.	"In This Dark"	3:42
6.	"Drums + Horns"	3:05
7.	"Dance Music"	2:34
8.	"Au Contraire"	3:11
9.	"Seven"	5:09
10.	"The Second Time"	4:54
11.	"Sweeter"	4:49
Total length:		42:47
