= Ratchet Orchestra =

- Origin: Montreal, Quebec, Canada
- Genres: Jazz, avant garde
- Years active: 1990s–present
- Labels: Drip Audio Records, Fontana North
- Members: Nicolas Caloia, etc.
- Website: Home website

The Ratchet Orchestra is an avant garde jazz musical group based in Montreal, Canada. The band was started in the early 1990s, when musical director Nicolas Caloia began experimenting with improvised chamber jazz. Members such as Tom Walsh, Jean Derome, Lori Freedman, Sam Shalabi, and Christopher Cauley soon joined. Four members played on their 1994 eponymous debut.

Their third album Hemlock brought in a large number of musicians, with 31 members counted on the back of the CD. It was recorded by Godspeed You! Black Emperor bassist Thierry Amar over several days at the Hotel 2 Tango studio, and released on Drip Audio Records in Vancouver. It was nominated for Instrumental Album of the Year at the Juno Awards of 2013.

A partial list of past and present members includes Jean Derome Flute, Bass Flute, and Piccolo; Craig Dionne Flute; Lori Freedman Clarinets; Gordon Krieger Bass clarinet; Christopher Cauley Soprano Saxophone; Yves Charuest Alto Saxophone; Louisa Sage, Alto Saxophone; Aaron Leaney Tenor Saxophone; Damian Nisenson Tenor Saxophone, Ida Toninato Baritone Saxophone, Bassoon; Jason Sharp Bass Saxophone, Ellwood Epps Trumpet; Philippe Battikha Trumpet, Eric Lewis trumpet, euphonium; Craig Pedersen trumpet; Tom Walsh Trombone; Scott Thomson Trombone; Jacques Gravel Bass Trombone; Thea Pratt French Horn; Noah Countability Sousaphone; Gabriel Rivest Tuba; Joshua Zubot Violin; Guido Del Fabbro Violin; Jean René Viola; Gen Heistek Viola; James Annett Viola; Norsola Johnson, Cello; Nicolas Caloia Bass, Synthesizer; Chris Burns Guitar, voice; Sam Shalabi Guitar; Guillaume Dostaler Piano, Synthesizer; Ken Doolittle Percussion, Voice; Michel Bonneau Congas; Isaiah Ceccarelli Drums; John Heward Drums.

The orchestra performed at the Guelph Jazz Festival in 2010, and at the Festival International de Musique Actuelle de Victoriaville (FIMAV) in 2011 and 2014. Their 2014 FIMAV performance featured guests Marshall Allen and Danny Thompson of the Sun Ra Arkestra in a program of Sun Ra's music in celebration of the 100th anniversary of Ra's birth. Other performances include l'Off Festival de Jazz de Montréal and the Suoni Per Il Popolo Festival.

Recently the Ratchet Orchestra has also performed the works of American composer and violinist Malcolm Goldstein.

== Awards and nominations ==
Year	Award	Nominated work	Category	Result
2013	Juno Awards of 2013	Hemlock - Ratchet Orchestra	Instrumental Album of the Year	Nominated

== Discography ==
=== Albums ===
Incomplete list of albums by Ratchet Orchestra
Year	Release title	Label and date
1994	Ratchet Orchestra	
2007	Ratchet Orchestra Live at Sala Rosa	(Nov 28, 2007)
2010	Bundled	Nicolas Caloia
2012	Hemlock	Fontana North / Drip Audio (digital on Oct 9, 2012)
