= Daniel Romano =

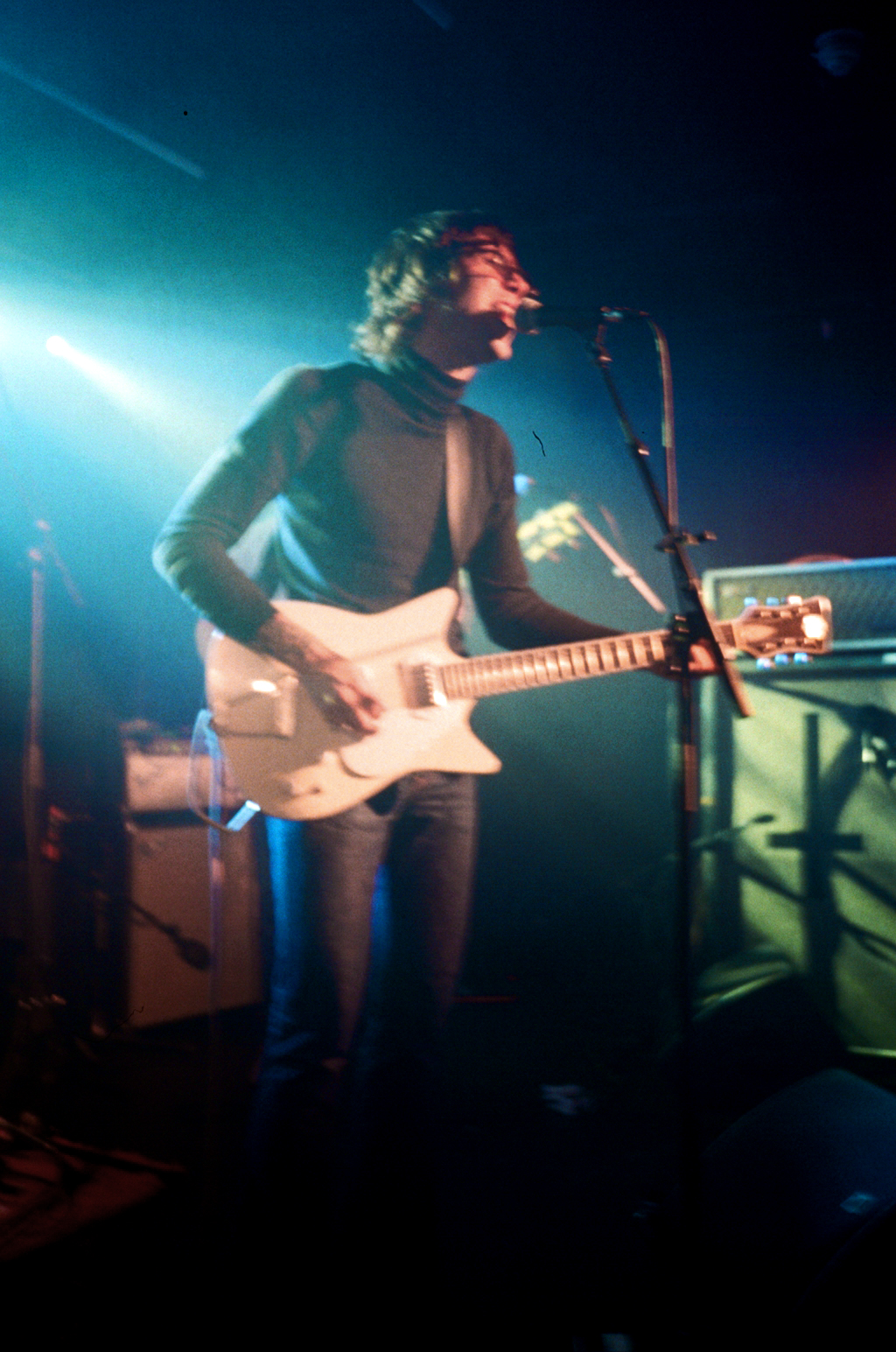
- Romano in 2018

Background information
- Born: 1985 (age 40–41); Welland, Ontario, Canada
- Genres: Rock; progressive; indie rock; neotraditional country; countrypolitan; hardcore punk (early)
- Labels: You've Changed; New West
- Website: www.danielromanomusic.com

Daniel Tavis Romano (born 1985) is a Canadian musician, poet and visual artist based out of his hometown of Welland, Ontario. He is primarily known as a solo artist, though he is also a member of Attack in Black and has collaborated with Julie Doiron, Tamara Lindeman and Frederick Squire. He has also produced and performed with City and Colour, the recording project of Dallas Green.

Romano is a partner in his own independent record label, You've Changed Records, along with Steve Lambke, of the Constantines.

Some of his notable visual work includes designs for M. Ward, Ben Kweller, Ladyhawk and City and Colour.

The Canadian music magazine Exclaim! has identified five distinct styles in Romano's work: a gentle, rustic folk sound personified by projects such as Daniel, Fred & Julie and Workin' for the Music Man, a retro country style on albums like Sleep Beneath the Willow and If I've Only One Time Askin', straight-ahead rock on Nerveless and How Ill Thy World Is Ordered, psychedelic rock on works like Modern Pressure and Visions of the Higher Dream, and punk rock in his works released under the band name Ancient Shapes.

Romano's 2011 album Sleep Beneath the Willow was a longlisted nominee for the 2011 Polaris Music Prize, and his 2013 album Come Cry With Me was longlisted for the 2013 Polaris Music Prize.

If I've Only One Time Askin' was nominated for a 2016 Juno Award for Adult Alternative Album of the Year.

On January 4, 2018, Romano released two simultaneous surprise albums, Human Touch and Nerveless.

In 2020, during the COVID-19 pandemic in Canada, Romano released several new albums of both newly recorded and archival material in quick succession. This began with the surprise album Visions of the Higher Dream, which was made available on his Bandcamp page for just $3. He followed up with the live album Okay Wow and the studio album Content to Point the Way, both recorded with his backing band The Outfit; and Super Pollen, a collaborative EP recorded with his brother Ian and Mike Haliechuk and Jonah Falco of Fucked Up. In May, he followed up with Forever Love's Fool, a 22-minute progressive rock track recorded with Danny Carey of the band Tool.

On June 18, 2021, Romano released a live album titled Fully Plugged In. Romano also announced another new album, Cobra Poems, set to release on September 10, 2021. He is also featured on Doiron's 2021 album I Thought of You.

In 2022 and 2023, Romano has appeared at some shows on the Sadies' concert tour to support Colder Streams as a guest guitarist. In 2025, he was announced as playing guitar in Pig Pen, a new band formed with celebrity chef Matty Matheson and Wade MacNeil of Alexisonfire.

== Discography ==
=== Daniel Romano's Outfit ===
Daniel Romano's Outfit has had considerable turnover. Past and present members include David Nardi (guitar, past member), Roddy Rosetti (electric bass, past member), Ian Romano (drums, present member), Julianna Riolino (vocals, past member), Carson McHone (vocals and auxiliary percussion, current member) and Tommy Major (bass, vocals, current member.

- How Ill Thy World Is Ordered (2020)
- Cobra Poems (2021)
- La Luna (2022)
- Too Hot to Sleep (2024)
- Preservers of the Pearl (2026)

=== Solo albums ===
- Workin' for the Music Man (2010)
- Sleep Beneath the Willow (2011)
- Come Cry With Me (2013)
- If I've Only One Time Askin' (2015)
- Mosey (2016)
- Modern Pressure (2017)
- Finally Free (2018)

=== Live Albums ===
- Okay Wow (2020)
- Fully Plugged In (2021)
- Live in Oslo (2025)

=== The Archive Series ===
- Human Touch (2018)
- Nerveless (2018)
- Visions of the Higher Dream (2020)
- Content to Point the Way (2020)
- Dandelion (2020)
- Forever Love's Fool, feat. Danny Carey (2020)
- White Flag (2020)
- Daniel Romano's Outfit Do (What Could Have Been) Infidels By Bob Dylan & the Plugz (2020)
- Kissing the Foe (2021)

=== with Ancient Shapes ===
- Ancient Shapes (2016)
- Silent Rave (2018)
- A Flower That Wouldn't Bloom (2019)

=== With Steve Lambke as Spider Bite ===
- Spider Bite (2020)
- The Rainbow and the Dove (2023)

=== With Kelly Sloan and David Nardi as Alias Ensemble ===
- A Splendour of Heart (2020)

=== With Frederick Squire and Julie Doiron ===
- Daniel, Fred & Julie (2009)

=== EPs ===
- Songs for Misha (2009)
- Super Pollen (2020)
