= Paper Moon (band) =

Canadian musical group

- Origin: Winnipeg, Manitoba, Canada
- Genre: Indie rock
- Years active: 2000–present
- Labels: Endearing; Quince Records
- Members: Allison Shevernoha; Chris Hiebert; John Wilson; Nikki Taylor; Ken Phillips
- Past members: Rob Rodgers; Leslie Oldham; Nicole Pielou; Heather Campbell; Bob Somers

Paper Moon is a Canadian indie rock band formed in 2000 in Winnipeg, that has released three albums and an EP. Their songs have been featured in over 20 films and television series, such as Degrassi, Radio Free Roscoe, Queer as Folk, Falcon Beach, Party of Five, and Departures.

== History ==
The band was formed by members of former Winnipeg bands B'ehl, The Bonaduces and The Electrosonics. Singer-keyboardist-guitarist Heather Campbell moved from Vancouver to Winnipeg to join three musicians who had played together in B'ehl: Allison Shevernoha, Bob Somers, and Chris Hiebert. They played their first show in May 2001, and released their first album, One Thousand Reasons To Stay, One Reason To Leave, in June 2002. The album was released on Endearing Records in Canada and on Quince Records in Japan, where the album had more sales than in the band's native country. Tracks from the album received airplay on campus radio and on CBC Radio. Paper Moon underwent major changes in its membership following Shevernoha's divorce from Somers, and then Campbell's departure to focus on working at the Endearing records label. Rob Rodgers and John Wilson joined the band; Nicole Pielou was added as they were finishing recording their second album. Leslie Oldham was recruited as well, bringing the band to six members in 2006.

In February 2006, the band released their second album, Broken Hearts Break Faster Every Day, under the Endearing Records label. It was nominated for a 2006 Western Canadian Music Award, for Outstanding Pop Recording. In 2009, the band released its third album, Only During Thunderstorms. The Edmonton Journal wrote that the band has "a mile-long track record for being one of the catchiest pop bands in Canada".

Paper Moon has also appeared on Intercontinental Pop Exchange No. 2, a split EP with Swedish band The Leslies, and on the children's compilation Somebody Needs a Timeout. Their musical influences include The Cardigans, Ivy, and Metric.

In 2012, the band September West was formed with current and past members of Paper Moon.

== Members ==
=== Current members ===
- Allison Shevernoha - Lead Vocals, Guitar, Keyboards
- Chris Hiebert - Drums
- John Wilson - Guitar
- Nikki Taylor - Keyboards, Guitar
- Ken Phillips - Bass

=== Former members ===
- Leslie Oldham - Vocals, Synth
- Rob Rodgers - Bass, Vocals, acting CEO.
- Nicole Pielou - Synthesizer, Vocals
- Robb Johannes - Guitar
- Heather Campbell - Synthesizer, Vocals, Guitar
- Bob Somers - Bass, Vocals
- Ryan Worsley - Bass, Guitars
- Alana Worsley - Keyboards, Vocals.

== Discography ==
- One Thousand Reasons To Stay, One Reason To Leave - 2002
- Intercontinental Pop Exchange No. 2 - 2003 (Split EP with The Leslies).
- Broken Hearts Break Faster Everyday - 2006
- Only During Thunderstorms - 2009
