= JF Robitaille =

Canadian singer-songwriter

- Origin: Montreal, Quebec, Canada
- Genres: Folk rock
- Occupation: Singer-songwriter
- Instruments: Vocals guitar
- Years active: 2006–present
- Labels: Sparks/Universal Music; V2 Records
- Formerly of: The Social Register
- Website: www.jfrobitaillemusic.com

JF Robitaille is a Canadian singer-songwriter born and raised in Montreal, Quebec.

== History ==
Prior to becoming a solo artist, JF Robitaille was the lead singer for Montreal indie-rock band The Social Register.

Robitaille was discovered in 2006 in New York City by Nona Hendryx. In 2007, he released his 6-track EP "The Blood In My Body," produced by Howard Bilerman (Arcade Fire) and Brian Paulson (Wilco, Beck) and it was released Via Hendryx's label, Rythmbank, to critical acclaim.

Robitaille had an LP fully recorded and mastered but it was never released due to his label folding in 2008.

On 5 July 2011, Robitaille released his first LP, 'Calendar,' produced by Adrian Popovich (Tricky Woo). The album features Drummer Chris Wise (Elephant Stone, Sunfields), bassist Tavo Diez De Bonilla (Octoberman, Two Minute Miracles) and guitarist Andrew Johnston as his back-up band. The album was released by the label Blue Cardinal Records.

Robitaille has been compared to Leonard Cohen, Nick Drake, Del Shannon, Morrissey and The Velvet Underground. He has also supported acts such as St. Vincent, Julie Doiron, Jonathan Richman, The Dears, Keane, Angus and Julia Stone and Sean Lennon.

The album "Rival Hearts" was released in 2013 on Sparks/Universal Music and was named one of the top 10 albums of the year by Brendan Kelly of CBC Radio One and The Montreal Gazette. After its initial Canadian release "Rival Hearts" was picked up and released by V2 Records in Benelux and G-Records (Rough Trade) in Germany.

In January 2016, the single "Missing You" ( featuring Julie Doiron ) was released, the track entered the CBC Radio 2 top 20 national chart at No. 6 and remained in the top 20 for 8 weeks. The album "Palace Blues", produced by Andy Magoffin, was released on 17 June.

In 2017 Robitaille teamed up with British singer-songwriter Lail Arad to release the single "We Got It Coming". The duo toured extensively in the UK and Europe.

== Discography ==
- 2006: The Blood in My Body (JF Robitaille)
- 2011: Calendar (JF Robitaille)
- 2013: Rival Hearts (JF Robitaille)
- 2016: Palace Blues (JF Robitaille)
