= Apollo Ghosts =

Canadian band

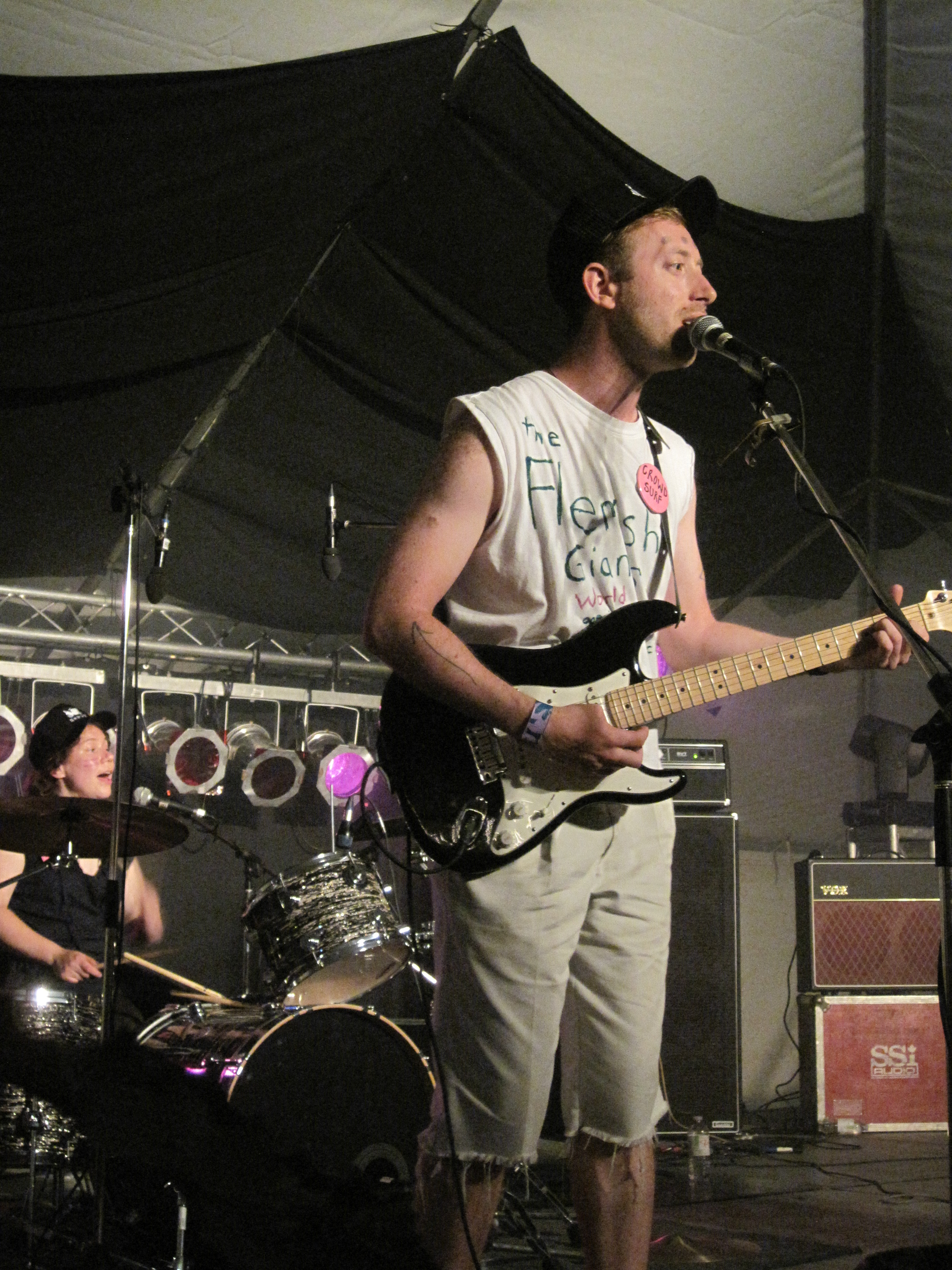
- Apollo Ghosts, July 2011

Background information
- Origin: Nanaimo, British Columbia, Canada
- Genres: Indie rock, Jangle-punk
- Years active: 2009–present
- Labels: Catbird Records, You've Changed Records, Geographing Records, Scotch Tapes, Kingfisher Bluez
- Members: Adrian Teacher; Amanda Panda; Hasan Li; Dustin Bromley
- Past members: Jason Oliver; Jarrett Samson; Robbie Nall; Luke N
- Website: Apollo Ghosts on Bandcamp

Apollo Ghosts is a Canadian indie rock Jangle-punk band formed in Nanaimo in 2009 and based in Vancouver, British Columbia. The original band was singer and guitarist Adrian Teacher, bassist Jason Oliver, and drummer Amanda Panda. Jarrett K (Jarrett Samson) later joined on Bass and Jason Oliver moved to second guitar. They reunited on January 20, 2019, with Teacher, Panda, Robbie Nall, and Luke N.

== History ==
The group released their first album, Hastings Sunrise, in 2009. That year, they also released the five-track EP Forgotten Triangle.

They followed up with Mount Benson in 2010. The latter album was a long-listed nominee for the 2010 Polaris Music Prize. Also in 2010, they contributed seven songs to Cedar Street, a 13-track split with Divine Prophet and Thee Ahs. They released a two-track EP with the band Role Mach and, in 2011, the five-track EP Money Has No Heart. The four-track For What They Do, They Do was also released in 2011. Apollo Ghost's third album, Landmark, was released in May, 2012 on You've Changed Records.

In 2013, the band announced that it was breaking up and that a May 10th show at Vancouver's Rickshaw Theatre would be their last. But, in 2019, they reunited and released the album Living Memory. They also played some concerts, including one with Calvin Johnson.

In 2020, they released the 35-track Local Delivery Only, on which they performed covers of songs by 35 Vancouver artists. The album was free to download and each time it was downloaded, the band donated $1 to DTES Response, a support collective which helps residents of Vancouver's Downtown Eastside.

== Discography ==
=== Albums ===
- Hastings Sunrise (2009) (Independent; re-released on Catbird/Geographing)
- Mount Benson (2010) (Independent)
- Money Has No Heart 7", (2011) (Geographing)
- Landmark (2012) (You've Changed Records)
- Living Memory (2019) (Independent)
- Local Delivery Only (2020) (self-released)
- Pink Tiger (2022) (You’ve Changed Records)

=== EPs ===
- Forgotten Triangle (2009) (Catbird Records)
- Split 7-inch with Role Mach (2010) (Geographing)
- Cedar Street with Divine Prophet and Thee Ahs (2010) (Scotch Tapes)
- For What They Do, They Do (2011) (Independent)
- Amethyst (2011) (Independent)

=== Singles ===
- "Dirty Letters to Nora" (2010) (Independent)
- "Honky Tonk's Blue Christmas" (2011) (Independent)
- "Night Witch" (2012) (Kingfisher Bluez)
- "One Trick Pony" (2012) (Independent)
