= The Caribbean (band) =

- Origin: Washington, D.C., United States
- Genres: Indie rock, experimental rock, art rock, post-rock, electronic music, field recording
- Years active: 1999–present
- Labels: Hometapes; Endearing Records; Little Voice; Tomlab; Hidden Shoal; West Main Development; Scioto
- Members: Michael Kentoff; Matthew Byars; Dave Jones; Don Campbell; Tony Dennison
- Website: http://thecaribbean.tumblr.com/

The Caribbean is an American experimental pop group from Washington, D.C., primarily composed of Michael Kentoff, Matthew Byars and Dave Jones. The band has been critically acclaimed for its deconstructionist approach to pop music, its wry, literary lyrics, and its eclectic sound, which incorporates elements of American pop, indie rock and experimental rock, cool jazz, folk music, lounge music, and even Brazilian music.

== History ==
Formed in 1999, The Caribbean began as a songwriting and recording project between members of Washington, D.C. indie rock and post-punk acts Townies and Smart Went Crazy. Townies singer-guitarist Michael Kentoff and drummer-guitarist Matthew Byars joined Smart Went Crazy drummer Tony Dennison and began writing and arranging new songs to record.

The recording collective grew in 2001 with the addition of multi-instrumentalist Don Campbell, which allowed it to tour for the first time as a group. For the most part, The Caribbean remained a recording collective as its members spanned Maryland, Florida, Minnesota, and Kentucky. Since 2004, all of their records have been mixed by producer/engineer/songwriter Chad Clark (Smart Went Crazy, Beauty Pill). The Caribbean's records eventually found release on Endearing Records, Germany’s Tomlab, and, later, respected underground imprint Hometapes. Western Australian experimental label Hidden Shoal Recordings releases The Caribbean’s less pop-song-oriented music, including a 2009 remix of the group's 2007 album, Populations, by producer/engineer Scott Solter (who has worked with John Vanderslice, Okkervil River, Fred Frith, and The Mountain Goats).

Guitar player Dave Jones joined in 2004 and the group again toured as a quartet until Campbell departed for graduate school in 2006. The trio of Kentoff, Byars, and Jones have stabilized as the main touring concern since then, with Campbell and Dennison still active in recordings."

The group has toured the United States and Canada extensively, including at respected North American music festivals such as South by Southwest, CMJ Music Marathon, Toronto’s North by Northeast and The Denver Post’s Underground Music Showcase.

=== Discontinued Perfume album ===
The band's 2011 album, Discontinued Perfume, received high praise from Pitchfork Media, with the reviewer stating: "It’s as though the band had all the pieces for comfortable indie pop in its possession but no interest in putting them into a standard order. This is of course what makes them interesting. They are bound to confound your expectations several times on any given album, and if you’re into that, they’re good enough at putting these weird songs together that they can pull you in with surprising ease."

In addition, the record received a 9/10 from PopMatters, wherein the review stated, "They walk out of step with prevailing pop-culture trends and fashions. Yet they’re making some of the most interesting and multi-faceted music that exists right now. Operating on the fringes, they’re nonetheless capturing essential dilemmas of our time, and doing so through the musical equivalents of quandaries, rumors, and whispers. To the band, the listener, the songs’ characters, and the instruments themselves, Discontinued Perfume is an exciting exercise in unlocking the puzzle that is the world around us." Additionally, PopMatters named Discontinued Perfume the "Best Indie-Pop Record of 2011" in their year-end "Best Of" list. "Mr. Let's Find Out" from the record was named to Washington, DC City Paper writer Ryan Little's "Ten Best Local Tracks of 2011," the title track from the record was named to DC City Paper Arts Editor Jonathan Fischer's "Ten Best Local Tracks of 2011," The Washington Post hailed the record as a "subtle masterpiece," and The Denver Post's online site Reverb listed the record as one of their Top 10 Albums of 2011.

The Caribbean has garnered further positive press in The Washington Post, The Washington City Paper, Magnet, Tiny Mix Tapes, Uncut (UK), The Denver Post, Flak, Stylus Magazine, Harp Magazine, and Signal to Noise.

=== Moon Sickness album ===
On October 25, 2013, Magnet magazine debuted the first single from The Caribbean's next release, Moon Sickness, "Imitation Air." On November 7, 2013, Rolling Stone debuted another song from Moon Sickness, "Jobsworth."

Moon Sickness was officially released on February 18, 2014, on Hometapes. In its review, the Washington Post compared the band to Scritti Politti, Talking Heads, and Caetano Veloso, describing them as a "quietly extraordinary DC trio." Denver Post Arts & Entertainment reporter John Wenzel tweeted that the record was "an early contender for Album of the Year," and the All Music Guide review stated that "When Moon Sickness settles in on fresh ears, the Caribbean's sometimes disorienting take on pop becomes as infectious as it is unique." The Utne Reader also debuted another song from Moon Sickness on release day, "Electric Bass," which featured contributions by Christopher Porterfield of Wisconsin band Field Report. Moon Sickness was named by the Denver Post as one of its Best Albums of 2014, and by the Washington City Paper as one of its Best Local Albums of 2014.

=== Vitamin Ship single ===
The band released a new single, "Vitamin Ship," in June 2018. The song was mixed by Beau Sorenson and mastered by Heba Kadry, and the video for it premiered on PopMatters on August 9, 2018. That was followed in October 2018 by the single "The Seventeenth Century," mixed by Don Gunn and again mastered by Heba Kadry. A subsequent remix album, "Vitamin Ships: Remixes" was released on Bandcamp on July 5, 2019, featuring remixes by Josh Kretzmer, Vance Stevenson, Ian Epps, Ursidae, Mike Shiflet, and Josh Mason.

== Discography ==
=== Albums ===
- Verse By Verse (Endearing, 2001)
- History’s First Know-It-All (Tomlab/Endearing, 2003)
- Plastic Explosives (Hometapes, 2005)
- Populations (Hometapes, 2007)
- Discontinued Perfume (Hometapes, 2011)
- Moon Sickness (Hometapes, 2014)

=== Singles and EPs ===
- The Caribbean (Little Voice, 1999)
- William of Orange (Hometapes, 2004)
- The Go from Tactical/The Beverly Boys (Hometapes, 2007)
- The 65 Cent Dinner/Tonight, It's Over (Scioto, 2011)

=== In Collaboration ===
- Scott Solter Re-Populates The Caribbean (Hidden Shoal, 2009)
