= Wooden Stars =

Canadian indie rock band

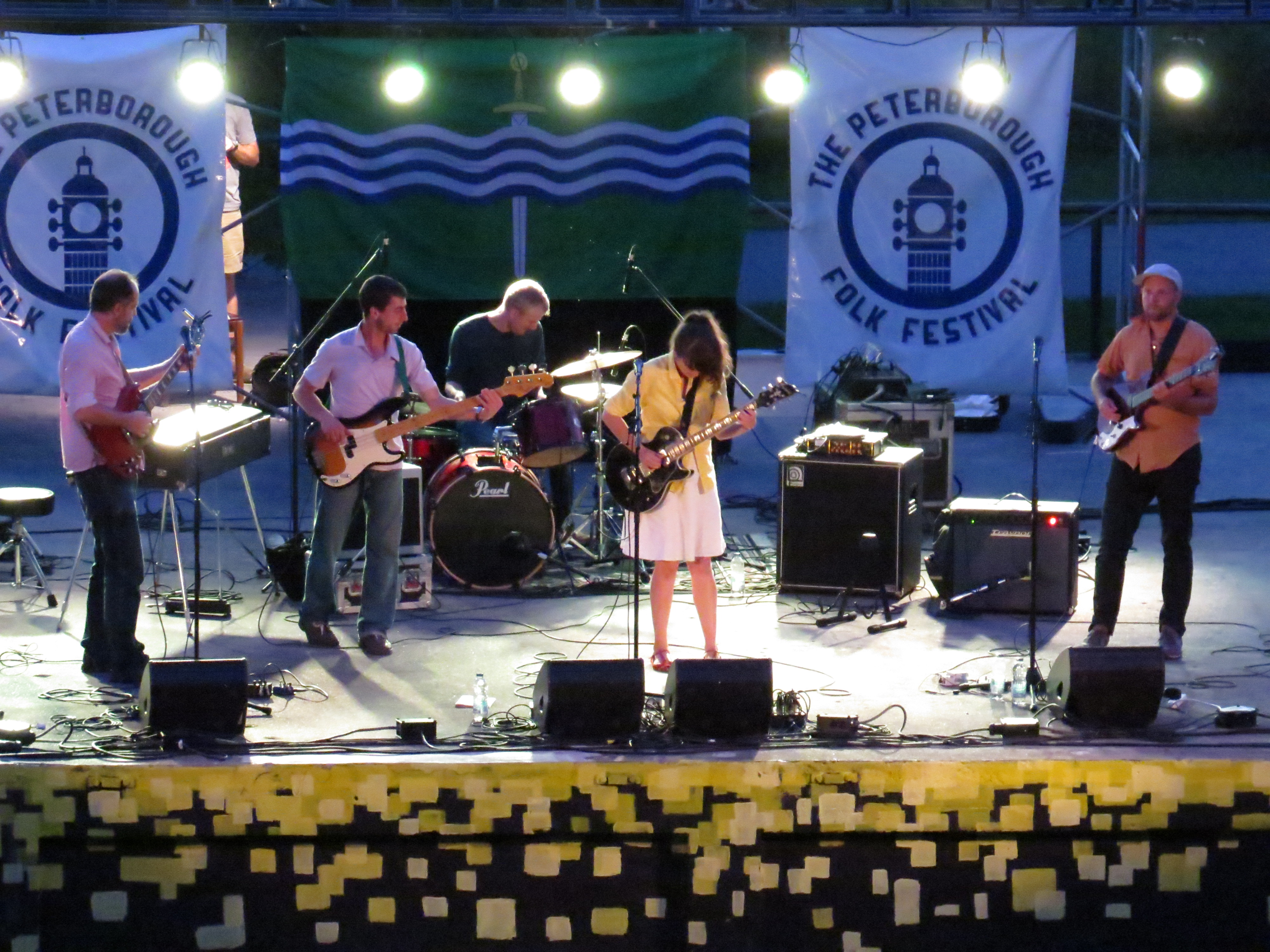
- Wooden Stars (with Julie Doiron) live in 2014

Background information
- Origin: Ottawa, Ontario, Canada
- Genres: Indie rock, grunge
- Years active: 1994–present
- Labels: Zunior, Sonic Unyon
- Members: Julien Beillard; Andrew McCormack; Mathieu Beillard; Michael Feuerstack; Josh Latour

Wooden Stars are a Canadian indie rock band formed in 1994. The band, from Ottawa, consists of vocalist and guitarist Julien Beillard, guitarist Michael Feuerstack, bassists Josh Latour and Mathieu Beillard, and drummer Andrew McCormack.

== Style ==
The band, who describe their music as "a fusion of unlikely influences ranging from XTC and The Clash to Georges Brassens and James Blood Ulmer", released four albums between 1995 and 1999.

== History ==
Rise Up & Get Down was released in 1998 on 12" vinyl by Rhythm of Sickness Records. In 1999, the Wooden Stars collaborated with singer-songwriter Julie Doiron on the album Julie Doiron and the Wooden Stars, which won a Juno Award for Best Alternative Album. Following that album, the band members concentrated on other projects, although the group never formally disbanded.

In 2004, they reunited to perform at the 40th birthday party of their longtime producer Dave Draves. In early 2005, the band played several reunion shows in Ottawa, Toronto and Hamilton, and rereleased their old material on Zunior Records. They released People Are Different, their first album in seven years, on Sonic Unyon in 2007.

In addition to the Wooden Stars, various band members have played with, or appeared with a variety of bands in Central Canada. Mike Feuerstack fronts his own band Snailhouse, played with long running Ottawa outfit Kepler, performs with Angela Desveaux, and appears on recent recordings by Bell Orchestre and Islands. Andrew McCormack played in CLARK the band of Ottawa.

In 2013, Invisible Publishing published Wooden Stars: Innocent Gears, a book about the band by author Malcolm Fraser. In 2014, the band appeared on the main stage at the Peterborough Folk Festival.

In 2016, the band played a reunion with Julie Doiron at SappyFest in Sackville, New Brunswick. They would play a selection of songs from their Juno winning album Julie Doiron and The Wooden Stars.

== Discography ==
- Wooden Stars (7-inch) (1994)
- The Very Same (1995)
- Mardi Gras (1997)
- Rise Up & Get Down (1998)
- The Moon (1999)
- Julie Doiron and the Wooden Stars (1999)
- People Are Different (2007)
