= Parkas =

Canadian pop music band

Parkas was a Canadian pop music band based in London, Ontario and later Toronto. Members were drummer Greg Rhyno, bassist/keyboard player Mark Rhyno, and guitarists Michael Brown and Paul Thompson.

== History ==
Parkas was formed in 2000 in London, where three of its members had moved from the Huntsville area to attend the University of Western Ontario. They began performing locally and then around Canada, including at the Halifax Pop Explosion in 2002.

The band began recording at the House of Miracles studio, and released an album Now this is Fighting in 2003 on the Endearing Records label to mixed reviews. The album appeared on the !earshot National Top 50 in September 2003.

The Parkas performed at Toronto's NXNE Festival in 2003 and 2004, and at SXSW in Texas in 2005.

In 2007, by which time the band was based in Toronto, Parkas released a second album, Put Your Head in the Lion's Mouth. The album received airplay on community and campus radio.

The Parkas released an album You Should Have Killed Us When You Had The Chance in 2009 on the Saved by Radio label, after the band had broken up. Singer Susanna Henderson performed with them on the recordings. This album as well was played on community and campus radio, appearing on the !earshot National Top 50 Chart in early 2010. In 2010, Parkas performed a reunion show at the El Macombo in Toronto.
