= So Many Days =

Studio album by Julie Doiron
- Released: October 23, 2012
- Genre: Indie rock
- Label: Aporia Records
- Producer: Rick White

Julie Doiron chronology
Daniel, Fred & Julie (2009)	So Many Days (2012)	Julie Doiron Canta en Español (2015)

Professional ratings
Review scores
Source	Rating
AllMusic	4/5 stars
Pitchfork	7.4/10

So Many Days is an album by Julie Doiron, released on October 23, 2012, on Aporia Records. It is Doiron's ninth solo album, and her third to be produced by her former Eric's Trip bandmate Rick White.

== Track listing ==
1. "Cars and Trucks"
2. "By the Lake"
3. "Can't Make It No More"
4. "Another Second Chance"
5. "Our Love"
6. "Where Are You?"
7. "The Only"
8. "I Thought I Could Do It"
9. "The Gambler"
10. "Beneath the Leaves"
11. "Homeless"
12. "Last Night I Lay in Bed"
