= You've Changed Records =

You've Changed Records is a Canadian independent record label founded in 2009 by Daniel Romano, Ian Kehoe of Attack in Black and Steve Lambke of Constantines.

Although both of the owners' primary bands released their records on other labels at the time, they formed You've Changed to release a split EP as well as material by their side projects. Romano has released a collaboration with Julie Doiron and Frederick Squire, Daniel, Fred & Julie, and several solo albums, while Lambke released Dog Weather and Bone Soldiers as Baby Eagle, and Kehoe has released music under the band name Marine Dreams.

In addition, the label has released material by Apollo Ghosts, Shotgun Jimmie, Richard Laviolette, Partner, The Weather Station, Status/Non-Status, Leanne Betasamosake Simpson, The Burning Hell and Julie Doiron, as well as picking up distribution rights to albums by Adam and the Amethysts and The Luyas which were originally released on the now-defunct Pome Records.

== Discography ==
Artist	Title	Format	Catalogue	Year	Ref
The Luyas	Faker Death	CD/Digital	POM-001	2007	
Adam and the Amethysts	Amethyst Amulet	CD/Digital	POM-002	2008	
Shotgun Jimmie	Still Jimmie	LP/CD/Digital	YC-001	2009	
Attack in Black/Baby Eagle	Split	LP	YC-002	2009	
The Luyas	Tiny Head/Spherical Mattress	7"	YC-45001	2009	
Daniel, Fred & Julie	Daniel, Fred & Julie	LP/CD/Digital	YC-003	2009	
Shotgun Jimmie	Paint It Pink	Digital	YC-004	2009	
Daniel Romano	Songs for Misha	LP	YC-005	2010	
Daniel Romano	Workin' for the Music Man	LP/CD/Digital	YC-006	2010	
Richard Laviolette and the Oil Spills	All of Your Raw Materials	LP/Digital	YC-007	2010	
Baby Eagle	Dog Weather	LP/CD/Digital	YC-008	2010	
Shotgun Jimmie	Transistor Sister	LP/CD/Digital	YC-009	2011	
Daniel Romano	Sleep Beneath the Willow	LP/CD/Digital	YC-010	2011	
The Weather Station	All of It Was Mine	LP/CD/Digital	YC-011	2011	
Marine Dreams	Marine Dreams	LP/CD/Digital	YC-012	2011	
Baby Eagle and the Proud Mothers	Bone Soldiers	LP/CD/Digital	YC-013	2012	
Apollo Ghosts	Landmark	LP/CD/Digital	YC-014	2012	
Shotgun Jimmie	Everything Everything	LP/CD/Digital	YC-015	2013	
Marine Dreams	Corner of the Eye	LP/CD/Digital	YC-016	2013	
Marine Dreams	Lemon Tree	Cassette/Digital	YC-017	2014	
The Constantines	Shine a Light	Vinyl Reissue	YC-018	2014	
The Weather Station	What Am I Going to Do With Everything I Know	Vinyl/Digital	YC-019	2014	
Community Theatre	Community Theatre	Vinyl/Digital	YC-020	2014	
Marine Dreams	Producer's Wonderland	Cassette/Digital	YC-021	2015	
Nap Eyes	Whine of the Mystic	LP/CD/Digital	YC-022	2015	
Steven Lambke	Days of Heaven	LP/CD/Digital	YC-023	2015	
Nap Eyes	Thought Rock Fish Scale	LP/CD/Digital	YC-024	2016	
Shotgun Jimmie	Field of Trampolines	LP/CD/Digital	YC-025	2016	
Ancient Shapes	Ancient Shapes	LP/CD/Digital	YC-026	2016	
Partner	Healthy Release	Cassette	YC-027	2016	
Adrian Teacher and the Subs	Terminal City	LP/CD/Digital	YC-028	2016	
Richard Laviolette	Taking the Long Way Home	LP/CD/Digital	YC-029	2017	
Jon McKiel	Memorial Ten Count	LP/CD/Digital	YC-030	2017	
Daniel Romano	Modern Pressure	LP/CD/Digital	YC-031	2017	
Partner	In Search of Lost Time	LP/CD/Digital	YC-032	2017	
Nap Eyes	I'm Bad Now	LP/CD/Digital	YC-033	2018	
Ancient Shapes	Silent Rave	LP/Cassette/Digital	YC-034	2018	
Daniel Romano	Finally Free	LP/CD/Digital	YC-035	2018	
Ian Daniel Kehoe	Secret Republic	LP/CD/Digital	YC-036	2019	
Steven Lambke	Dark Blue	LP/CD/Digital	YC-037	2019	
Partner	Saturday the 14th	LP/CD/Digital	YC-038	2019	
Shotgun Jimmie	Transistor Sister 2	LP/CD/Digital	YC-039	2019	
WHOOP-Szo	Warrior Down	LP/CD/Digital	YC-041	2019	
Ancient Shapes	A Flower That Wouldn't Bloom	LP/CD/Digital	YC-042	2019	
Jon McKiel	Bobby Joe Hope	LP/CD/Digital	YC-043	2020	
Daniel Romano	Okay Wow	LP/CD/Digital	YC-044	2020	
Daniel Romano	How Ill Thy World Is Ordered	LP/CD/Digital	YC-045	2020	
Partner	Never Give Up	LP/CD/Digital	YC-046	2020	
Status/Non-Status	1, 2, 3, 4, 500 Years	LP/CD/Digital	YC-047	2021	
Leanne Betasamosake Simpson	Theory of Ice	LP/CD/Digital	YC-048	2021	
Fiver with the Atlantic School of Spontaneous Composition	Fiver with the Atlantic School of Spontaneous Composition	LP/CD/Digital	YC-049	2021	
Daniel Romano	Fully Plugged In	LP/CD/Digital	YC-050	2021	
Daniel Romano	Cobra Poems	LP/CD/Digital	YC-051	2021	
Julie Doiron	I Thought of You	LP/CD/Digital	YC-052	2021	
Steven Lambke	Volcano Volcano	LP/Digital	YC-053	2022	
The Burning Hell	Garbage Island	LP/CD/Digital	YC-054	2022	
