= Will You Still Love Me? (EP) =

EP by Julie Doiron
- Released: 1999
- Genre: Indie rock
- Length: 14:14
- Label: Tree Records; Sappy Records

Julie Doiron chronology
Loneliest in the Morning (1997)	Will You Still Love Me? (1999)	Julie Doiron and the Wooden Stars (1999)

Professional ratings
Review scores
Source	Rating
AllMusic	4/5 stars
Pitchfork	6.8/10

Will You Still Love Me? is an EP by Julie Doiron, released in 1999.

== Critical reception ==
AllMusic called the EP a "powerful, maturing work" where "the guitar picking style sounds like a merry-go-round, starting up and slowing down according to emotion through the music and singing."

== Track listing ==
1. "He Will Forget" - 4:04
2. "Again, Again" - 3:22
3. "Stay Now, Then Go" - 2:56
4. "Will You Still Love Me in December" - 2:51
5. "For Me" - 5:05
