= Julie Doiron =

Canadian singer-songwriter (born 1972)

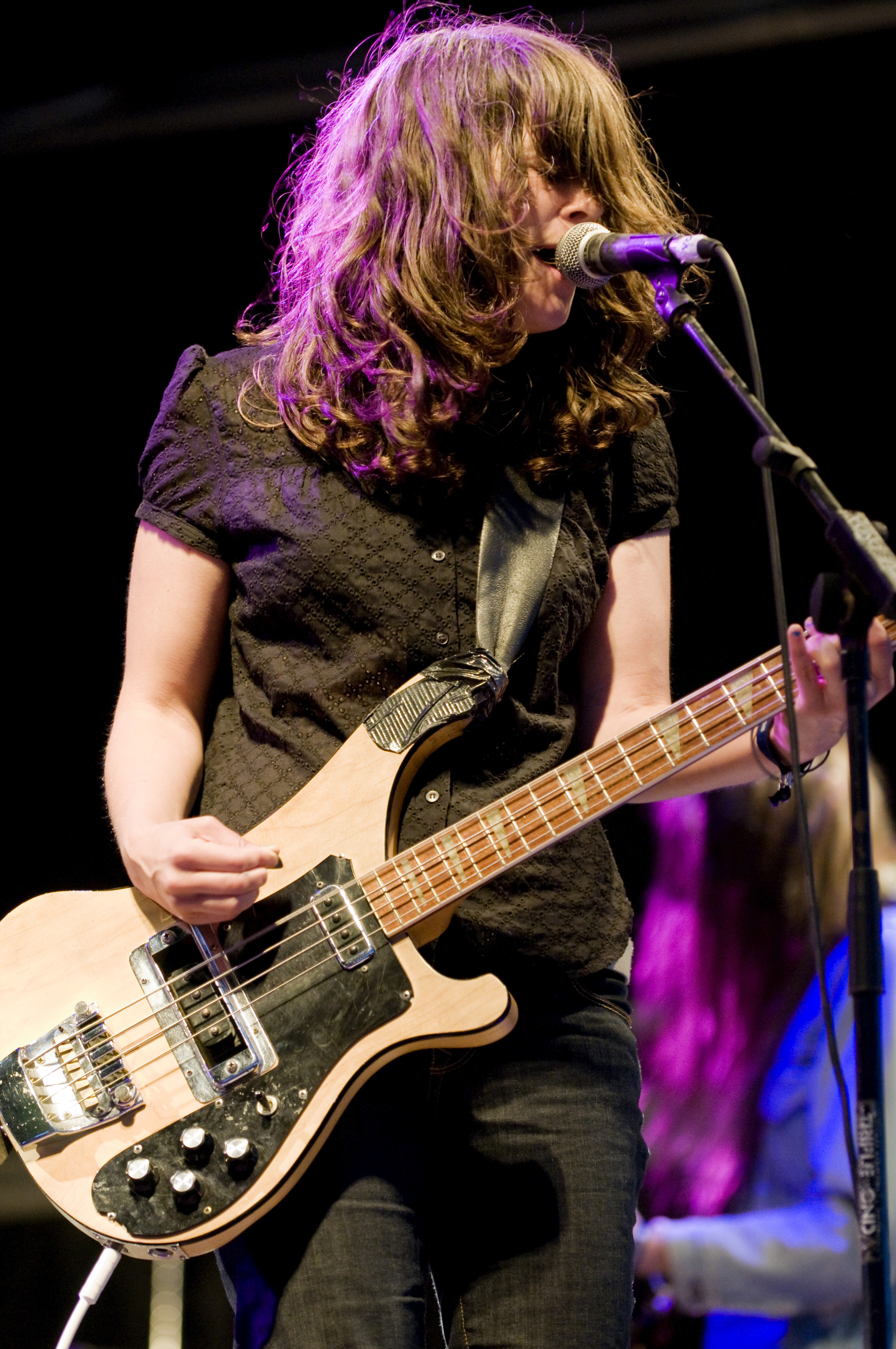
- Julie Doiron live in 2008

Background information
- Also known as: Broken Girl
- Born: Julie Elaine Doiron; June 28, 1972 (age 54); Moncton, New Brunswick, Canada
- Genres: Folk rock; indie rock
- Occupations: Singer; songwriter; bass guitarist
- Instruments: Vocals; guitar; bass; drums
- Years active: 1990–present
- Labels: The Numero Group; Jagjaguwar; Sappy; Acuarela Discos; Endearing; Sub Pop
- Formerly of: Eric's Trip; Shotgun & Jaybird; Weird Lines; Julie & the Wrong Guys
- Website: www.julie-doiron.com

Julie Elaine Doiron (born June 28, 1972) is a Canadian singer-songwriter of Acadian heritage. She has been the bassist and co-vocalist for the Canadian indie rock band Eric's Trip since its formation in 1990. Doiron has also released ten solo albums, beginning with 1996's Broken Girl, and is also the lead singer for the band Julie and the Wrong Guys.

== Early life ==
Julie Elaine Doiron was born in Moncton, New Brunswick. She graduated from École Mathieu-Martin, a francophone high school in Dieppe, in 1990.

== Career ==
Doiron started playing guitar (later switching to bass) in Eric's Trip at the age of 18, having joined the band at the insistence of her then-boyfriend, Eric's Trip guitarist Rick White. Shortly before the band's break-up in 1996, she released a solo album under the name Broken Girl, which followed two previous 7-inch EPs ("Dog Love, Pt. 2" & "Nora") also released under that name. All of her subsequent material has been released under her own name. She started her own label, Sappy Records, to release several of her solo efforts. Although most of her solo material has been written and performed in English, she also released an album of French language material, Désormais, as well as several EPs of material sung in Spanish.

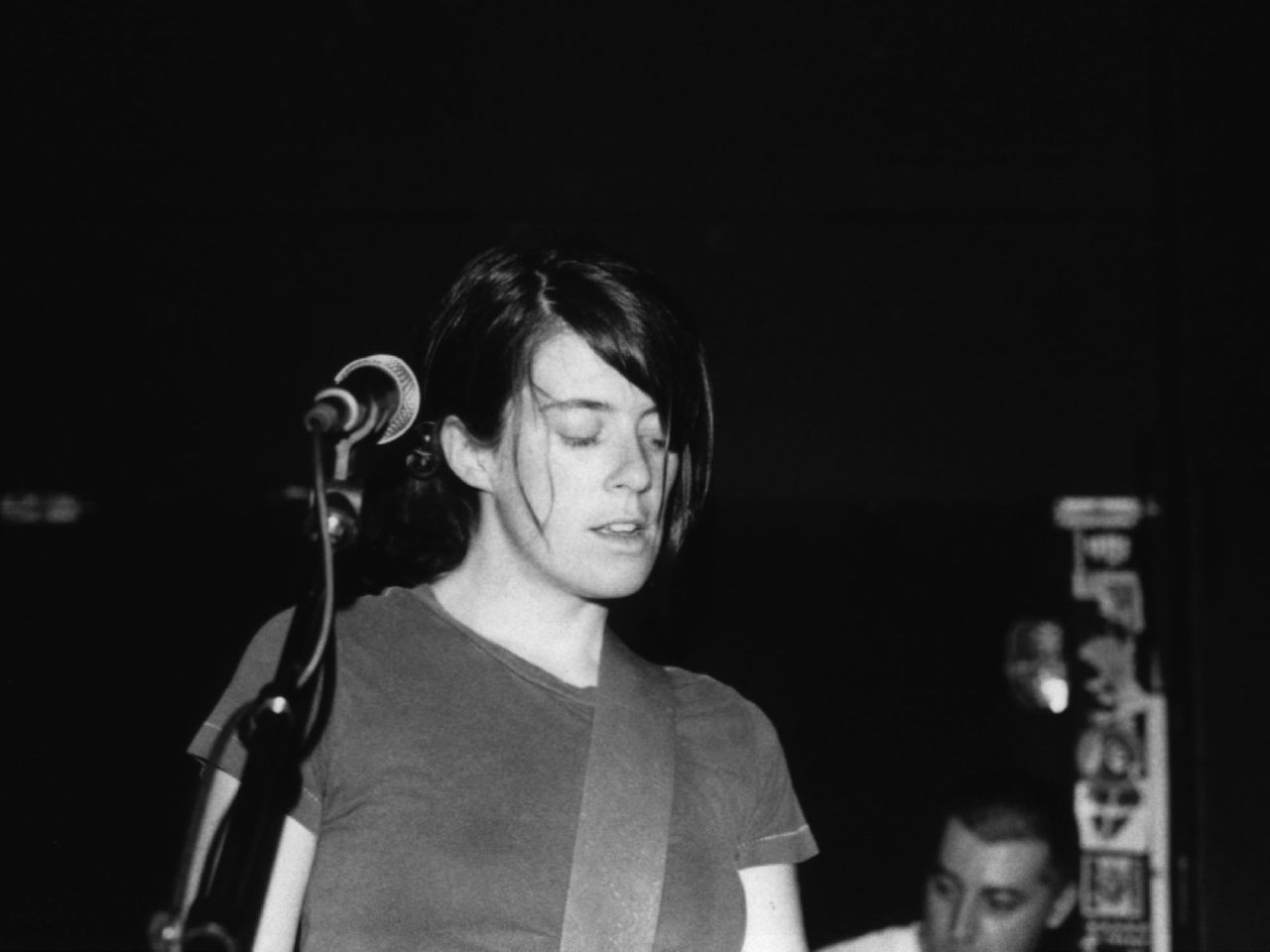
Julie Doiron playing with Eric's Trip in Saskatoon, 2001

In 1999, Doiron performed at the 1999 Stardust Picnic festival at Historic Fort York, Toronto. That year she recorded an album with the Ottawa band Wooden Stars, which was the first time she had worked with a band since the end of Eric's Trip. Also in 1999, she was featured in a film, entitled Salt, which was filmed that fall. The film was created by the National Film Board of Canada, and released in 2000. She shared a Juno Award for Julie Doiron and the Wooden Stars in March 2000.

Eric's Trip reunited in 2001, and have played shows periodically ever since. She has also appeared as a guest musician on albums by The Tragically Hip (2000s Music at Work), Gordon Downie (2001's Coke Machine Glow, 2003's Battle of the Nudes and 2010's The Grand Bounce), and Herman Düne. In 2006 she helped launch SappyFest with Paul Henderson and Jon Claytor as an extension of the reinstated Sappy Records. She has also released a split record co-credited to the alternative country band Okkervil River, and collaborated with Frederick Squire and American musician Phil Elverum on the 2008 Mount Eerie album Lost Wisdom. She played with indie rock band Shotgun & Jaybird until their demise in 2007. She also played drums as part of a short-lived duo with Fred Squire. Initially called "Blue Heeler", they changed their name to "Calm Down Its Monday", and released a split 7-inch EP on K Records, with two solo Doiron songs on the flip side.

Apart from her musical career, Doiron is an avid photographer, having published a book of her photographs entitled The Longest Winter with words by Ottawa writer Ian Roy. She often does her own promotional photos and cover artwork along with her ex-husband, painter Jon Claytor.

Her album Woke Myself Up was shortlisted for the 2007 Polaris Music Prize.

In 2009, Doiron told a reporter from The Strand, a college newspaper at the University of Toronto, that she and Chad VanGaalen were exploring the possibility of collaborating on an album. She appeared on a track from VanGaalen's EP of Soft Airplane B-sides that year, but no further news pertaining to a potential album collaboration has been released.

During the tour to support the 2009 album I Can Wonder What You Did with Your Day, the mayor of Bruno, Saskatchewan proclaimed June 7, 2009, as "Julie Doiron Day". Doiron performed at the local All Citizens arts centre on that day.

Over the three-year period between I Can Wonder and her 2012 album So Many Days, Doiron moved several times, residing at different times in Montreal, Toronto and Sackville. While living in Toronto, she had difficulty making ends meet due to the city's high cost of living, and began teaching yoga classes, and performing a weekly residency at the Saving Gigi club, to help pay the bills. By the time So Many Days was released in the fall of 2012, she had moved back to Sackville.

In July 2014, Doiron's song "The Life of Dreams", from I Can Wonder What You Did with Your Day, appeared in an iPhone commercial.

In 2016, Doiron collaborated with musicians Jon McKiel, C.L. McLaughlin, Michael C. Duguay, James Anderson and Chris Meaney on the project Weird Lines, whose self-titled album was released on Sappy Futures in July. She then collaborated with Eamon McGrath, Mike Peters and Jaye Schwarzer on the project Julie and the Wrong Guys, which released a self-titled album in 2017 on Dine Alone Records. In 2017 and 2018, Doiron has also released several EPs of Spanish language renditions of her own previously recorded songs.

In 2021, Doiron released the album I Thought of You. Her first full-length solo recording in nine years, it includes musical contributions from Daniel Romano and Dany Placard. The song "August 10" from Broken Girl became popular on TikTok in late 2024 and early 2025, leading to the song reaching number 12 on the Billboard Hot Rock & Alternative Songs chart on January 16, 2025. In February 2025, the Numero Group announced a campaign to reissue Broken Girl on vinyl for the first time and Loneliest In The Morning back in print for the first time since its initial release cycle in the 90s. The Numero Group also announced that Doiron would be joining the line up for the Numero 22 anniversary show in April 2025.

== Personal life ==
Doiron has moved several times throughout her career, living in Montreal for six years until moving to Sackville in 2004 with the release of Goodnight Nobody. When she was married to Jon Claytor, they had three children. As of 2022, Doiron was in a relationship with Quebec-based musician Dany Placard, with whom she released a collaborative album Julie & Dany that year.

== Discography ==
=== Studio albums ===
==== Solo albums ====
List of solo studio albums, with release date and label shown
Title	Details
Broken Girl (as Broken Girl)	Released: April 1996; Label: Sub Pop, Sappy, Jagjaguwar; Format: CD
Loneliest in the Morning	Released: September 1997; Label: Sub Pop, Jagjaguwar; Format: CD, LP
Désormais	Released: 2001; Label: Jagjaguwar, Endearing; Format: CD, digital download
Heart and Crime	Released: 2002; Label: Jagjaguwar, Endearing; Format: CD, LP
Goodnight Nobody	Released: 2004; Label: Jagjaguwar, Endearing, P-Vine, Acuarela, Vicious Circle; Format: CD, LP
Woke Myself Up	Released: January 23, 2007; Label: Jagjaguwar, Endearing, Acuarela; Format: CD, LP
I Can Wonder What You Did with Your Day	Released: March 10, 2009; Label: Jagjaguwar, Endearing, Think; Format: CD, LP
So Many Days	Released: October 23, 2012; Label: Aporia; Format: CD, LP
Canta en Español Vol. II	Released: 2017; Label: Acuarela; Format: LP
Canta en Español Vol. III	Released: 2018; Label: Acuarela; Format: LP
Canta en Español Vol. IV	Released: 2019; Label: Acuarela; Format: LP
I Thought of You	Released: November 26, 2021; Label: You've Changed; Format: CD, LP

==== Collaborative albums ====
List of collaborative studio albums, with release date and label shown
Title	Details
Julie Doiron and the Wooden Stars (with Wooden Stars)	Released: 1999; Label: Sappy, Tree, Jagjaguwar; Format: CD, LP
Julie Doiron / Okkervil River (with Okkervil River)	Released: July 23, 2003; Label: Acuarela; Format: CD
Lost Wisdom (with Mount Eerie and Frederick Squire)	Released: October 7, 2008; Label: P. W. Elverum & Sun; Format: CD, LP
Daniel, Fred & Julie (with Daniel Romano and Frederick Squire)	Released: December 1, 2009; Label: You've Changed; Format: CD, LP
Julie & the Wrong Guys (with Julie & the Wrong Guys)	Released: September 8, 2017; Label: Dine Alone; Format: CD, LP
Lost Wisdom pt. 2 (with Mount Eerie)	Released: November 8, 2019; Label: P.W. Elverum & Sun Ltd.; Format: LP
Julie & Dany (with Dany Placard)	Released: April 29, 2022; Label: Simone, Costume; Format: LP
Together (with Rick White)	Released: July 18, 2026; Label: Blue Fog Recordings; Format: LP

=== Extended plays ===
List of extended plays, with release date and label shown
Title	Details
Dog Love Part II (as Broken Girl)	Released: 1993; Label: Sappy; Format: LP
Nora	Released: 1995; Label: Sappy; Format: LP
Will You Still Love Me?	Released: 1999; Label: Tree, Jagjaguwar; Format: CD

=== Singles ===
List of singles as lead artist
Title	Year	Album
"Who Will Be the One"	1999	Heart and Crime
"Love Without Possession"	2019	Lost Wisdom pt. 2
"Belief Pt. 2"	2019	Lost Wisdom pt. 2
"You Gave Me the Key"	2021	I Thought of You

=== Guest appearances ===
List of guest appearances, with year, other artist(s), and album
Title	Year	Album
"So Fast"	1996	More of Our Stupid Noise
"On the Road Again"	2010	Subterranean Home Sick Blues: A Tribute to Bob Dylan's Bringing It All Back Home
"Missing You" (with JF Robitaille)	2016	Palace Blues
"I Don't Know"	2021	Through the Soil

=== Other charted songs ===
List of other charted songs, with selected chart positions
Title	Year	Peak chart positions		Album
Title	Year	US Bub.	US Rock	Album
"August 10"	1996	24	15	Broken Girl
