= Little Bird Flies into a Big Black Cloud =

Studio album by the Microphones
- Released: September 13, 2002
- Genre: Indie folk
- Length: 39:30
- Label: St. Ives
- Producer: Phil Elverum

The Microphones chronology
| Song Islands (2002) | Little Bird Flies into a Big Black Cloud (2002) | Mount Eerie (2003) |

Professional ratings
Review scores
| Source | Rating |
|---|---|
| AllMusic | 2.5/5 stars |
| Tiny Mix Tapes | 5/5 stars |

Little Bird Flies into a Big Black Cloud is an album by the Microphones. It was released in 2002 by St. Ives.

The album was recorded on February 2, 2002, and limited to 400 copies.

== Critical reception ==
AllMusic called the album "probably a little too intimate and rough for all but the most dedicated fans." Tiny Mix Tapes wrote that "despite the 'low' fidelity, these songs are far from mere demos or blueprints or live versions; they are the sound of a process, a performance; the sound of a song in its most naked state."

== Track listing ==
The original physical release did not list track titles; these are derived from the album's Bandcamp page.

1. "I'm Like You, Tree" – 1:42
2. "I Show You Myself as a Fruit Tree" – 3:46
3. "I Was Afraid All of the Day" – 2:45
4. "Underlying Tone of Threat" – 2:09
5. "The Glow Pt. 2 Sequel" – 3:25
6. "I'll Not Contain You (Piano)" – 2:18
7. "Can I Bring This Bloom Inside?" – 3:44
8. "Who Would Want to Hear What I Have to Say?" – 2:07
9. "We're Here to Listen" – 3:12
10. "I Got Stabbed" – 3:41
11. "Phil Elvrum's Will" – 1:14
12. "Three Steps" – 1:14
13. "The Water Is Wide" – 2:38
14. "I Can See the Glowing Core in You" – 1:10
15. "Fist Beats Chest" – 0:51
16. "I'd Like a Truce" – 1:04
17. "When Traveling I Used to See" – 0:47
18. "There's No Invincible Disguise That Lasts All Day" – 1:36
