= Beams (band) =

Canadian psych-folk band

- Origin: Toronto
- Genres: Psych-Folk
- Years active: 2012–present
- Members: Anna Mernieks, Heather Mazhar, Keith Hamilton, Martin Crawford, Craig Moffatt, Mike Duffield
- Past members: David Hamilton

Beams is a psych-folk band formed in Toronto in 2012. The group have worked with noted producers John McEntire (Tortoise, Broken Social Scene, Yo La Tengo) and Grammy winner Peter J. Moore (Dylan & The Band, Neil Young, Joni Mitchell).

Notable media coverage has included continuous appearances in leading roots & Americana magazine No Depression, the Financial Times highlighting their cover of Kate Bush's Running Up That Hill, and regular appearances in Canadian music media including the CBC, Exclaim!, Now, Chart Attack, plus various local television programs, newspapers, and blogs.

== Discography ==
Studio Albums

- 2021 – Ego Death
- 2018 – Teach Me To Love
- 2013 – Just Rivers
- 2023 – Requiem For A Planet (Be My Sibling record label)

Singles

- 2023 Take Back Ten
- 2021 Born to Win
- 2019 Sweet Tea
- 2018 You Are an Ocean
- 2018 Berlin
- 2017 I Wanted To Tell Her
- 2015 Running Up That Hill
- 2015 The Gutters & The Glass
- 2013 Be My Brother / Glory Box

EPs

- 2015 The Gutters & the Glass
