= Song Islands =

Compilation album by the Microphones
- Released: August 20, 2002
- Recorded: 1998–2002
- Genre: Indie rock
- Length: 68:40
- Label: K Records; P.W. Elverum & Sun, Ltd. (ELV 030)

The Microphones chronology
The Glow Pt. 2 (2001)	Song Islands (2002)	Little Bird Flies into a Big Black Cloud (2002)

Professional ratings
Review scores
Source	Rating
AllMusic	4/5 stars
Pitchfork Media	7.2 / 10

Song Islands is a collection of singles and rare songs by the Microphones, recorded between 1998 and 2002.

== Track listing ==
No.	Title	Length
1.	"Bass Drum Dream"	3:09
2.	"The Storm"	1:00
3.	"Where It's Hotter, Pts. 1, 2, 3"	4:12
4.	"Feedback (Life, Love Loop)"	5:28
5.	"Weird Storm"	2:59
6.	"Heavy Eyes"	2:48
7.	"Moon Moon"	2:24
8.	"I Lost My Wind"	2:33
9.	"I Can't Believe You Actually Died"	4:49
10.	"I'm a Pearl Diver"	3:08
11.	"The Moon"	5:24
12.	"(version)"	4:34
13.	"Lanterns"	3:02
14.	"Antlers"	3:41
15.	"Deeply Buried"	5:23
16.	"Wake Me Up"	3:23
17.	"I Listen Close"	2:16
18.	"The Glow, Pt. 4"	3:21
19.	"You're Standing on the Ground"	1:37
20.	"Phil Elvrum's Will"	1:26
21.	"There's No Invincible Disguise That Lasts All Day"	2:03
Total length:		68:40
