= Partner (band) =

- Origin: Sackville, New Brunswick, Canada
- Genres: rock, power pop, punk rock
- Years active: 2014–present
- Label: You've Changed Records
- Members: Josée Caron; Lucy Niles

Partner is a Canadian rock band, originally formed in Sackville, New Brunswick, and later based in Windsor, Ontario. The band is most noted for winning the SOCAN Songwriting Prize in 2018 for their song "Play the Field".

== History ==
Vocalist and lead guitarist Josée Caron and vocalist and rhythm guitarist Lucy Niles, two lesbians who met as students at Mount Allison University, played together in the bands Mouthbreathers, Yellowteeth, and Go Get Fucked. In 2014, the pair formed Partner in Sackville with guitarist Daniel Legere, bassist Kevin Brasier and drummer Brendan Allison. The group first attracted widespread attention in 2015 when their video "The 'Ellen' Page", created from Creative Commons-licensed footage of actor Elliot Page dancing, went viral after being promoted on social media by Page himself. In 2016, they released the cassette Healthy Release, a collection of their early singles, on You've Changed Records.

In 2016, Partner toured as a power-pop group, performing in various venues, including at the Silver Dollar in Toronto as part of Canada Music Week.

Partner moved to Windsor, Ontario in 2016 before releasing their full-length debut album In Search of Lost Time in 2017. The album appeared on the !earshot National Top 50 Chart for four months, beginning in October that year, was a shortlisted finalist for the 2018 Polaris Music Prize, and was nominated for an East Coast Music Award.

They released the EP Saturday the 14th in 2019. "Play the Field" was subsequently used as the theme song for the comedy web series Slo Pitch, which premiered in 2020.

Their second full-length album, Never Give Up, was released in November 2020.
