= Casper Skulls =

Canadian indie rock band

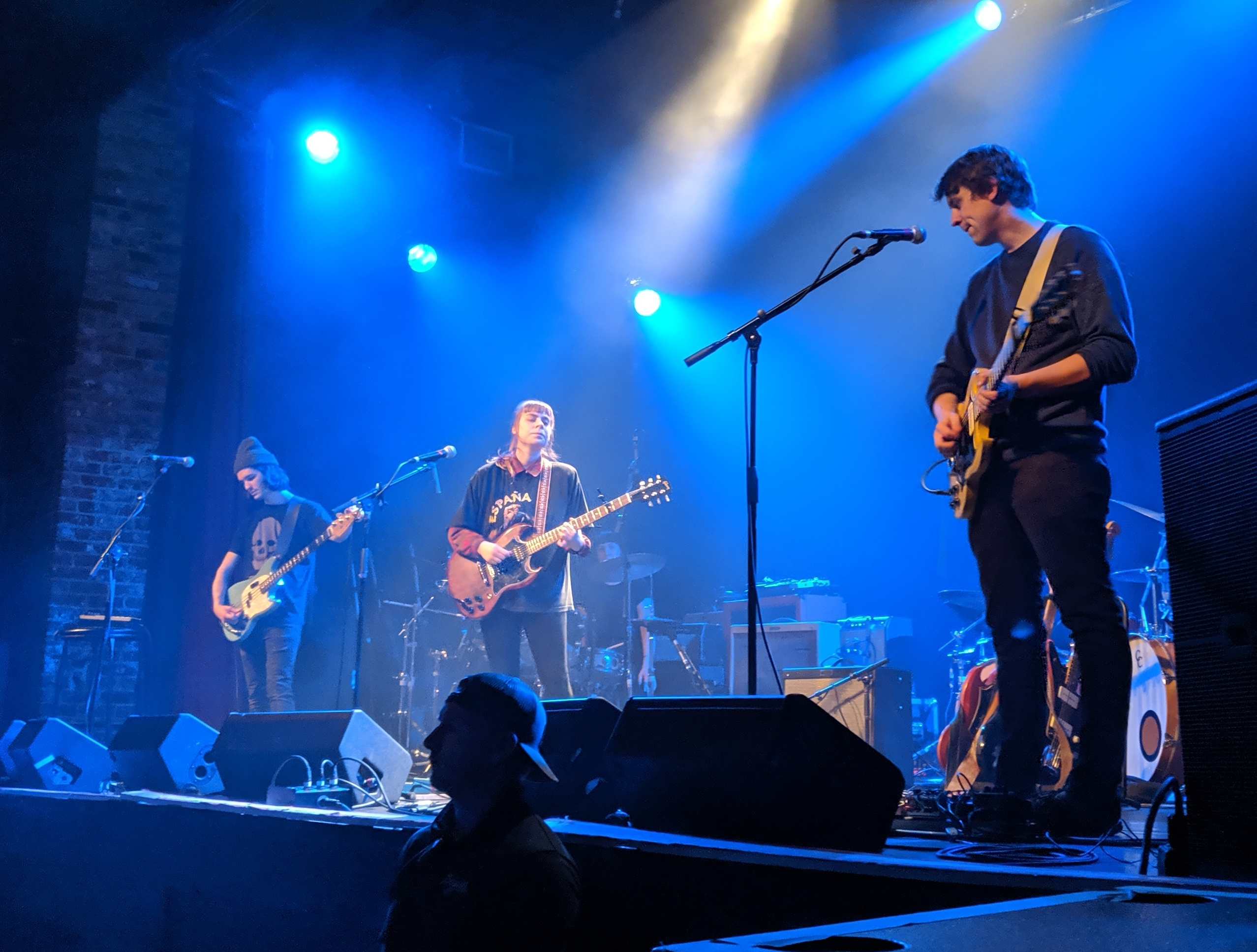
- Casper Skulls performing in 2019

Background information
- Origin: Sudbury and Toronto, Ontario, Canada
- Genre: Indie rock
- Years active: 2015–present
- Members: Neil Bednis; Melanie St-Pierre; Fraser McClean
- Past members: Chris Anthony; Aurora Bangarth

Casper Skulls are a Canadian indie rock band from Toronto, Ontario. They are most noted for receiving a SOCAN Songwriting Prize nomination in 2018 for their song "Lingua Franca".

== History ==
Casper Skulls was formed in 2015 by Neil Bednis and Melanie St-Pierre, musicians and romantic partners from Sudbury who moved to the Toronto area when St-Pierre started studying art and design at Sheridan College. They added bassist Fraser McClean and drummer Chris Anthony, and began performing in Toronto venues. In 2016 they signed with Buzz Records and released their debut EP Lips & Skull.

In 2017, they released their debut full-length album, Mercy Works. During their tour to support the album, they were involved in a vehicle collision en route to SXSW, and launched a crowdfunding campaign to assist in paying for a new tour van. The band members themselves were uninjured, and were able to get to Austin to perform.

In 2019, they went on tour as a supporting act for PUP, a punk rock group from Toronto, on their Morbid Stuff Tour-Pocalypse.

The band released its second full-length album, Knows No Kindness, in 2021. Their third album, Kit-Cat, is slated for release in April 2025.

Melanie St-Pierre has also released solo music under the name l'loop.
