= Sound of Pop =

Sound of Pop is an independent record label, music publishing and licensing company based in Nova Scotia, Canada. Sound of Pop represents many musical artists. In 2015 it has two divisions, the label Sound of Pop Records and a publishing and representation agency Sound of Pop Publishing. In 2015 Sound of Pop is owned and operated by Glenn McMullen, and acts as the worldwide administrator for the SOP music publishing catalogue with offices in Toronto, Nashville and Los Angeles.

== History ==
Sound of Pop was founded in 2001.

In 2009 and again in 2012 and 2013, Sound of Pop was nominated as Company of the Year at the East Coast Music Awards. In 2010 and 2011 the company was nominated as Record Label of the Year. IN 2015 the company was named Music Merchant of the Year at the awards event. In 2016 Sound of Pop was nominated as music company of the year.

== Services ==
Sound of Pop Records signs emerging musicians and bands. The company provides talent development services, including co-writing, recording, manufacturing, national and international distribution and international licensing. In Canada, Sound of Pop Records are distributed through Fontana North/Universal Music Canada and internationally through the Independent Digital Licensing Agency (IDLA).

== Artists ==
Artists whose recordings have been released on Sound of Pop Records include Carmol Mikol, Afterparty, Camille Miller, Coco Love Alcorn, Jenny Galt, the Fed Pennies, The Motorleague, Brandon Jones and Bettie Serveert
