= Blood (The Microphones album) =

Compilation album by the Microphones
- Released: 2001
- Genres: Indie, experimental
- Length: 43:14

The Microphones chronology
It Was Hot, We Stayed in the Water (2000)	Blood (2001)	The Glow Pt. 2 (2001)

Professional ratings
Review scores
Source	Rating
Pitchfork Media	(8.2/10) link

Blood is a 2001 album by the Microphones. It was handmade, and limited to 300 original copies. Included on the album were recordings and alternate versions of songs later found on The Glow Pt. 2, in addition to sound collages, field recordings and other miscellany. Also included was a cover of Björk's "All Is Full of Love".

Track three is significant because of the name it is credited to "the Thunderclouds." The Thunderclouds were a short-lived Beach Boys cover band that featured bandleader Phil Elverum and his then-girlfriend Khaela Maricich The opening line off of the Microphones album The Glow Pt. 2 is "The thunderclouds broke up.", a reference to not simply the weather but more specifically the ending of the couple's romantic relationship.

== Track listing and liner notes ==
Side One
No.	Title	Length
1.	"Horns from "The Moon" Saxophones (3) played by Karl Blau on September 21, 2000 at Dub Narcotic studio in Olympia, Wash"	2:30
2.	"Jason Anderson telling a crowd at Espresso Roma about cleaning up all the blood after badly cutting his foot by stepping into a metal hole in the floor at Chris' parents' house in Grand Junction, Colo. on Aug 21st 2000 (story told Aug 22nd)"	0:41
3.	"Khaela Maricich and Phil Elvrum (the Thunderclouds) rehearsing "Don't Worry Baby" by the Beach Boys on the Silvertone chord organ. Late February 1999"	0:16
4.	"Samurai Sword" being made up and sung by Phil Elvrum walking down Jefferson St. Between Legion and 7th in Olympia Nov. 2000"	1:20
5.	"The very end of "Gaping Hole" by Get the Hell Out of the Way of the Volcano played by Khaela Maricich and Phil Elvrum, July 1, 2000 followed by a bird outside Dub Narcotic Studio"	0:14
6.	"Tape Loop Collage by Phil Elvrum, Dub Narcotic Studio July 30, 2000"	1:01
7.	"Humming from "I Want to Be Cold" by Phil Elvrum. Dub Narcotic September 3, 2000"	0:34
8.	"Organs and Pianos from "The Moon" played by Phil Elvrum. Dub Narcotic September 16, 2000"	0:33
9.	"Thank You Microphones" sung by a bunch of people in Anacortes, Wash. (on 7th st. and "H" ave.) on December 17, 2000: They are: Dave Matthies – singing, Darrin Matthies – Singing, Nate Ashley – Bass, Brian Malloy – Guitar and Singing, Bill Cook – Drums, Karl Blau – Piano and Singing. It was made up on the spot and recorded from the middle of the room"	2:46
10.	"Choir from "The Sun" by Mirah recorded at Dub Narcotic, September 15, 2000 with Nate Ashley, Jenn Kliese, Anna Huff, Khaela Maricich, Mirah Yom Tov Zeitlyn, Jeanie Question and Phil Elvrum, twice"	1:51
11.	"A Bird in a Tree at about 2 in the morning in Santa Cruz, Calif on June 21st 2000, 316 Cliff St."	1:11
12.	"Slighted" by Mirah recorded at Dub Narcotic on January 20, 2001 by Mirah – signing, songwriting, percussion, Jason Anderson – organ, Phil Elvrum – drums, Karl Blau – bass, saxophone, Eddy Blau – Guitar, trumpet"	2:07
13.	""You'll Be in the Air" version with Jacob Navarro, Eddy Blau, Dave Matthies, Nate Ashley, Karl Blau and Phil Elvrum. Recorded at Dub Narcotic on Dec. 10th 2000"	1:04
14.	"The horns from "So I Finally Belong to the Night" by the Little Wings, written by Kyle Field. Karl Blau – Saxophone, flute, Eddy Blau – Trumpet, Melodian. Recorded at Dub Narcoti Dec. 10th 2000"	2:41
15.	"A little bit of Amber Bell sweeping the steps to the studio and saying something before "Map" sung by Phil Elvrum as it was made up walking home down Jefferson St. Late November 2000"	1:41
16.	"Map" Version played by Phil Elvrum at Dub Narcotic studio, December 16, 2000"	1:20
Total length:		21:49

Side Two
No.	Title	Length
1.	"Sleepy Hollow"	2:51
2.	"I Felt My Size"	2:36
3.	"The Gleam pt. 2"	1:45
4.	"I Want to Be Cold"	2:26
5.	"Samurai Sword"	1:00
6.	"I'll Not Contain You"	3:26
7.	"All Is Full of Love" (All of these were recorded at Dub Narcotic Studio, Olympia, on February 8, 2001 by Phil Elvrum who had a cold and was sad about the loss of Every O. E. Kitty a few days before. It was snowing. "All Is Full of Love" was made up by Björk. These were recorded between 10am and 1pm in that same order.)	1:52
8.	"Cut up drums from "Dark of the Male, Light of the Female" by Old Time Relijun, played and cut up by Phil Elvrum. Recorded July 12, 2000 at Dub Narcotic, of course"	2:11
9.	"The end of "Moon Moon Moon" by the Microphones band that played at Yo-Yo-a-Go-Go in 1999: Recorded live at the Capitol Theatre, July 14th 1999 with: Karl Blau – drums, singing; Mirah Zeitlyn – Guitar, singing; Phil Elvrum – Bass, singing; Khaela Maricich – Organ, singing"	2:40
10.	"A bunch of people spontaneously breaking out into a clapping ritual in Hugh and Carrie's living room and kitchen in Santa Cruz, Calif. on June 24th, 2000. Echo added later"	0:37
Total length:		21:35
