= Status/Non-Status =

Canadian alternative rock band

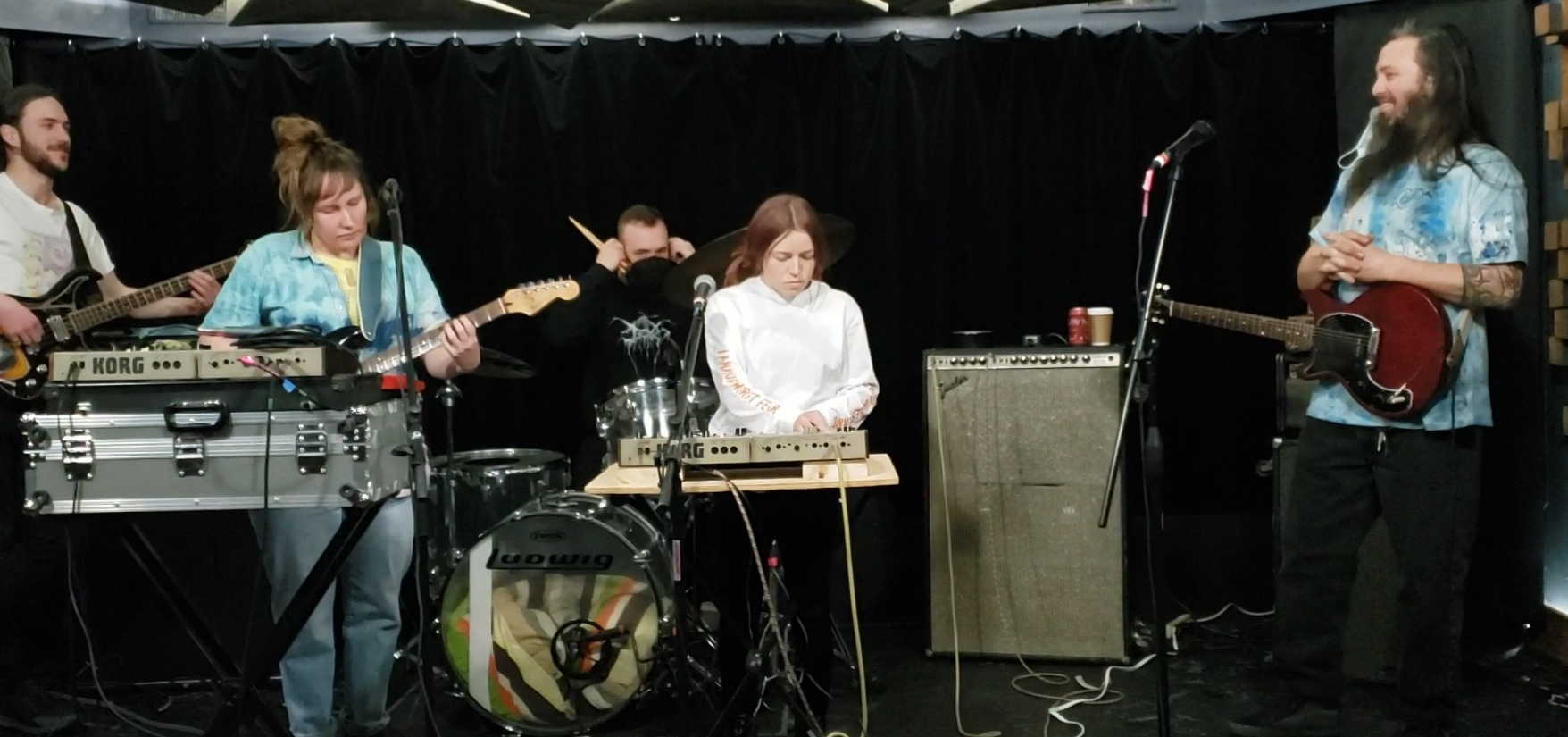
- Status/Non-Status photographed in Montréal, Québec, Canada at the Diving Bell Social Club.

Background information
- Origin: Guelph, Ontario, Canada
- Genres: Alternative, folk
- Years active: (2009–present)
- Labels: Out Of Sound Records, You've Changed Records
- Members: Adam Sturgeon (vocals, guitar); Kirsten Kurvink Palm (guitar, synth, vocals); Jessica O'Neil (guitar, synth); Steven Lourenço (bass, vocals); Eric Lourenço (drums)
- Website: https://statusnonstatus.bandcamp.com

Status/Non-Status is a Canadian alternative rock band from London, Ontario, led by Anishinaabe-Canadian singer-songwriter Adam Sturgeon. The band is most noted for its 2019 album Warrior Down, which was longlisted for the 2020 Polaris Music Prize.

== Background ==
Sturgeon was born on March 19, 1984, in Erin, Ontario, and is the son of former National Hockey League player Peter Sturgeon. Like his father, Sturgeon was a hockey player in the Ontario Junior Hockey League and Ontario Hockey League before his career was ended by an arm injury.

== History ==
=== WHOOP-Szo ===
WHOOP-Szo was founded in Guelph, Ontario in 2009 by Adam Sturgeon and Kirsten Kurvink Palm. The band's original name came from Margaret Craven's I Heard the Owl Call My Name. When the band relocated to London, Ontario, several years after their formation, they expanded and incorporated three new members: Joe Thorner, Andrew Lennox, and Eric Lourenço.

In 2014, WHOOP-Szo released the two-part album Qallunaat/Odemin. The record was inspired by the band's year long stay in Salluit, Quebec, working with indigenous youth.

In March 2019, as part of Juno Week for the 2019 JUNO Awards, WHOOP-Szo opened for Canadian metal band Voivod. In November 2019, WHOOP-Szo put out their album Warrior Down through You've Changed Records, which made the 2020 Polaris Music Prize longlist. Warrior Down features Sturgeon's grandfather on the cover, a survivor of Canada's Residential School system.

WHOOP-Szo was set to embark on a North American tour in 2020. In mid-March 2020, after playing only a handful of shows, the band was forced to cancel the remainder of their tour due to COVID-19 restrictions.

=== Status/Non-Status ===
In 2021, Sturgeon announced that he was changing the project's name to Status/Non-Status, calling attention to the political and legal distinction between status and non-status indigenous people in Canada. Concurrently, he released the EP 1 2 3 4 500 Years, which was recorded in 2018 during a trip to Guadalajara, Mexico.

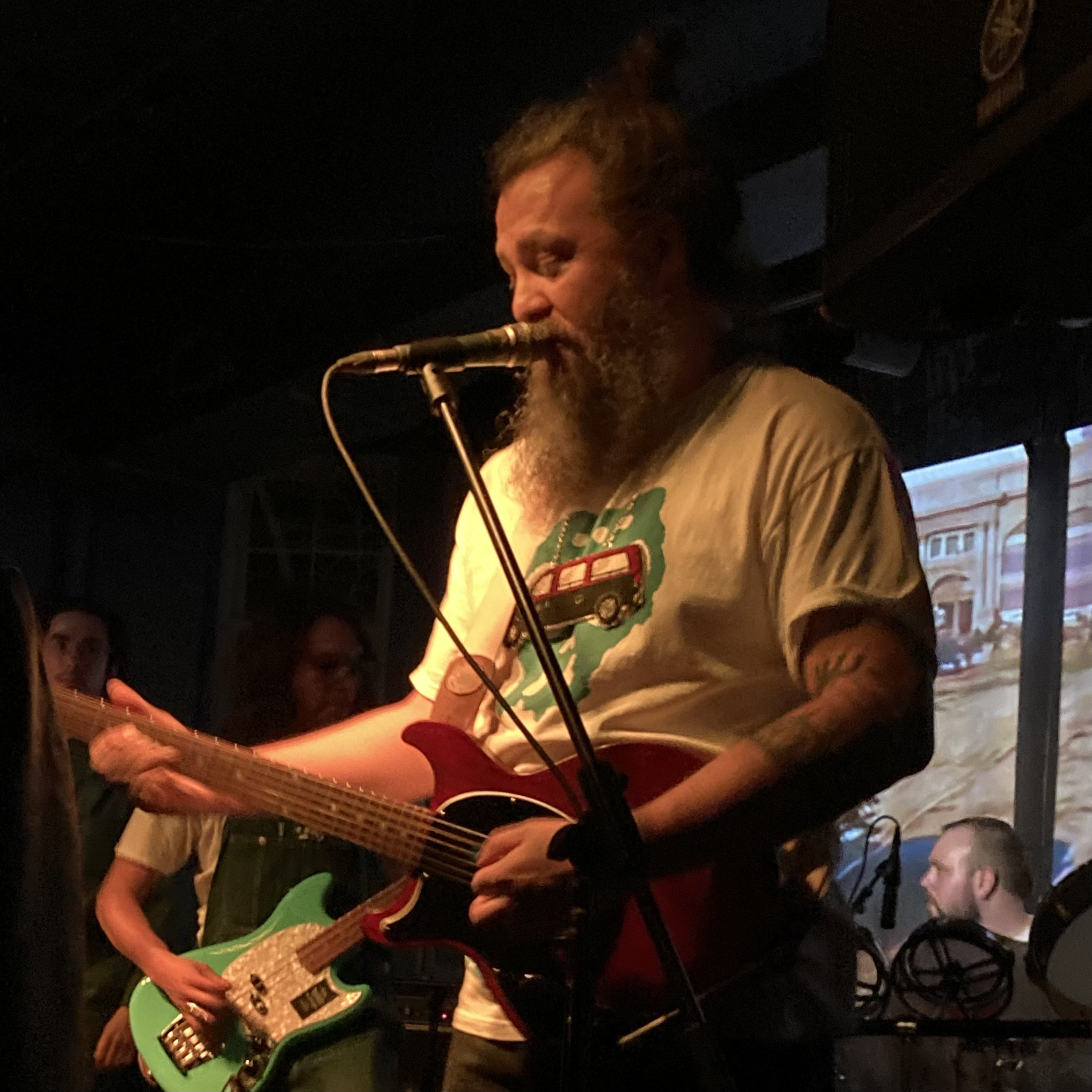
Adam Sturgeon performing with OMBIIGIZI in London, Ontario.

On September 23, the band's sophomore album Surely Travel was released. The band released a surprise EP on January 3, 2023, titled January 3, consisting of three songs that were held back from making the cut for Surely Travel.

=== Collaborations ===
Sturgeon has also collaborated with Daniel Monkman of Zoon in OMBIIGIZI, releasing their debut collaborative album Sewn Back Together in 2022 and were shortlisted for the 2022 Polaris Music Prize.

== Discography ==
=== WHOOP-Szo ===
- Citizen's Ban(ne)d Radio (2016)
- Warrior Down (2019)
- Warrior Remixes (2020)

=== Status/Non-Status ===
- 1 2 3 4 500 Years (2021)
- Surely Travel (2022)
- January 3rd (2023)
- Big Changes (2026)
