= Julie Doiron / Okkervil River =

Studio album by Julie Doiron and Okkervil River
- Released: July 23, 2003
- Recorded: December 2002
- Genre: Indie rock
- Length: 39:14
- Label: Acuarela
- Producer: Julie Doiron and Okkervil River

Julie Doiron chronology
Heart and Crime (2002)	Julie Doiron / Okkervil River (2003)	Goodnight Nobody (2004)

Julie Doiron / Okkervil River is an album release, a CD split between Julie Doiron and alternative country band Okkervil River, was released on July 23, 2003. Doiron's half of the split was recorded at home in the winter of 2002. The track "He Passes Number Thirty-Three" is reproduced from a previous Okkervil River EP. Love and a longing for home are the themes of Doiron's half of the split while Okkervil River's tracks predominantly deal with murder.

== Track listing ==
1. "The Sweetest Eyes (When You Laugh)" – Julie Doiron
2. "Snow Falls in November" – Julie Doiron
3. "The Songwriter" – Julie Doiron
4. "The Wrong Guy" – Julie Doiron
5. "Cancel the Party" – Julie Doiron
6. "He Passes Number Thirty-Three" – Okkervil River
7. "Omie Wise" – Okkervil River
8. "A Leaf" – Okkervil River
9. "Blackest Coat" – Okkervil River
10. "The Sweetest Eyes (When You Laugh)" – Julie Doiron and her children (uncredited hidden track)
