= Endearing Records =

Canadian independent record label

- Founded: 1994
- Founder: Blair Purda
- Distributor: Fontana North
- Genre: Indie rock, indie pop
- Country of origin: Canada
- Location: Vancouver, British Columbia
- Official website: endearing.com

Endearing Records is a Canadian independent record label established in 1994, now based in Vancouver, British Columbia, originally based in Winnipeg, Manitoba, Canada. Endearing Records has released many albums by Canadian indie artists since the mid-1990s, such as Destroyer, The Meligrove Band, Julie Doiron, The Heavy Blinkers, The Waking Eyes, Paper Moon and Aaron Booth. In 2005, the company started up a separate publishing company, Endearing Publishing which represents the Endearing Records catalogue along with a number of labels such as Vinyl Republik, Saved By Radio, Balanced Records, Bacteria Buffet Records, Submerged Records, Elefant Records, weework and others.

== Bands ==
- The Caribbean
- Destroyer
- Julie Doiron
- The Heavy Blinkers
- The Meligrove Band
- Painted Thin
- Paper Moon
- Parkas
- The Pets
- Plumtree
- The Waking Eyes
- The Bonaduces

== See also ==
- List of record labels
