= Juno Award for Alternative Album of the Year =

Yearly Alternative album award

The Juno Award for Alternative Album of the Year is presented annually at Canada's Juno Awards to honour the best album of the year in the alternative rock and/or indie rock genres. The award was first presented in 1995 under the name Best Alternative Album, and adopted its current name in 2003.

== Achievements ==
Arcade Fire and July Talk have won the award three times to date, while Broken Social Scene, Metric, Alvvays and Rufus Wainwright have won the award twice each. In addition to Broken Social Scene's wins as a band, three members have also won the award for separate projects — Emily Haines and James Shaw have also won the award twice with their band Metric, and Leslie Feist has won for a solo album. Arcade Fire have been nominated for the award four times overall, while July Talk, Broken Social Scene, Metric, Alvvays, Stars, Chad VanGaalen, and Tegan and Sara have received three nominations each.

Only two French-language albums have ever been nominated (Malajube's Trompe-l'œil and Karkwa's Les Chemins de verre) and none has ever won.

== Recipients ==
=== Best Alternative Album (1995–2002) ===
Year	Winner(s)	Album	Nominees	Ref.
1995	Rose Chronicles	Shiver	Smilin' Buddha Cabaret – 54-40; Forever Again – Eric's Trip; Project Twinkle – King Cobb Steelie; Naveed – Our Lady Peace; Twice Removed – Sloan	
1996	Art Bergmann	What Fresh Hell Is This?	Somebody Spoke – The Hardship Post; Kombinator – The Inbreds; Fluke – Rusty; Mock Up, Scale Down – The Super Friendz	
1997	Sloan	One Chord to Another	Purple Blue – Eric's Trip; It's Sydney or the Bush – The Inbreds; Limblifter – Limblifter; Self Title – Treble Charger	
1998	Bran Van 3000	Glee	Love Story – Copyright; Stuff – Holly McNarland; Get Outta Dodge – Huevos Rancheros; Maybe It's Me – Treble Charger	
1999	Rufus Wainwright	Rufus Wainwright	Bring Yourself Up – Bodega; BTK – BTK; Breath from Another – Esthero; The Closer I Get – Hayden	
2000	Julie Doiron and Wooden Stars	Julie Doiron and the Wooden Stars	My Love Is Bold – Danko Jones; You Can't Stop the Bum Rush – Len; Clayton Park – Thrush Hermit; Sometimes I Cry – Tricky Woo	
2001	The New Pornographers	Mass Romantic	Carpal Tunnel Syndrome – Kid Koala; Mayday – King Cobb Steelie; The East Infection – Ramasutra; Left and Leaving – The Weakerthans	
2002	Rufus Wainwright	Poses	Constantines – Constantines; (Last Night We Were) The Delicious Wolves – Hawksley Workman; Down at the Khyber – Joel Plaskett Emergency; Night of the Shooting Stars – Rheostatics	

=== Alternative Album of the Year (2003–present) ===
Year	Winner(s)	Album	Nominees	Ref.
2003	Broken Social Scene	You Forgot It in People	Square – Buck 65; Make Up the Breakdown – Hot Hot Heat; The New Deal – The New Deal; Alone at the Microphone – Royal City	
2004	Buck 65	Talkin' Honky Blues	Shine a Light – Constantines; Truthfully Truthfully – Joel Plaskett; Heart – Stars; Reconstruction Site – The Weakerthans	
2005	Feist	Let It Die	The Slow Wonder – A.C. Newman; Funeral – Arcade Fire; Now, More Than Ever – Jim Guthrie; Set Yourself on Fire – Stars	
2006	Broken Social Scene	Broken Social Scene	Elevator – Hot Hot Heat; Live It Out – Metric; Twin Cinema – The New Pornographers; So Jealous – Tegan and Sara	
2007	City and Colour	Sometimes	Skelliconnection – Chad VanGaalen; Return to the Sea – Islands; Trompe-l'œil – Malajube; Not Saying/Just Saying – Shout Out Out Out Out	
2008	Arcade Fire	Neon Bible	LP – Holy Fuck; Close to Paradise – Patrick Watson; The Con – Tegan and Sara; Welcome to the Night Sky – Wintersleep	
2009	The Stills	Oceans Will Rise	In the Future – Black Mountain; Soft Airplane – Chad VanGaalen; The Chemistry of Common Life – Fucked Up; Parc Avenue – Plants and Animals	
2010	Metric	Fantasies	Face Control – Handsome Furs; Post-Nothing – Japandroids; I Can Wonder What You Did With Your Day – Julie Doiron; Sainthood – Tegan and Sara	
2011	Arcade Fire	The Suburbs	Forgiveness Rock Record – Broken Social Scene; Les Chemins de verre – Karkwa; Heartland – Owen Pallett; Champ – Tokyo Police Club	
2012	Dan Mangan	Oh Fortune	Native Speaker – Braids; Kaputt – Destroyer; David Comes to Life – Fucked Up; Creep on Creepin' On – Timber Timbre	
2013	Metric	Synthetica	Hannah Georgas – Hannah Georgas; Celebration Rock – Japandroids; Little Mountain – Said the Whale; The North – Stars	
2014	Arcade Fire	Reflektor	The Poet's Dead – Rah Rah; Today We're Believers – Royal Canoe; Warring – The Darcys; UZU – Yamantaka // Sonic Titan	
2015	July Talk	July Talk	Alvvays – Alvvays; Shrink Dust – Chad VanGaalen; Animism – Tanya Tagaq; Hot Dreams – Timber Timbre	
2016	BRAIDS	Deep in the Iris	Poison Season – Destroyer; Are You Alone? – Majical Cloudz; Half Free – U.S. Girls; Viet Cong – Viet Cong	
2017	July Talk	Touch	IV – Black Mountain; Sore – Dilly Dally; Art Angels – Grimes; Weaves – Weaves	
2018	Alvvays	Antisocialites	Everything Now – Arcade Fire; Life After Youth – Land of Talk; Retribution – Tanya Tagaq; Wide Open – Weaves	
2019	Dizzy	Baby Teeth	Ken – Destroyer; Dose Your Dreams – Fucked Up; TPC – Tokyo Police Club; In a Poem Unlimited – U.S. Girls	
2020	PUP	Morbid Stuff	Destroyer – Black Mountain; Foxwarren – Foxwarren; Here Comes the Cowboy – Mac DeMarco; Pony – Orville Peck	
2021	July Talk	Pray for It	Heavy Light — U.S. Girls; Pity Party — Curtis Waters; The Sun and Her Scorch — Dizzy; This Place Sucks Ass — PUP	
2022	Mustafa	When Smoke Rises	Death of an Optimist — Grandson; The Fool — SATE; Hope for Sale — Chiiild; If It Comes Down to It — Ruby Waters	
2023	Alvvays	Blue Rev	Duality — Luna Li; Sewn Back Together — OMBIIGIZI; Tongues — Tanya Tagaq; The Unraveling of PUPTheBand — PUP	
2024	Aysanabee	Here and Now	Dizzy, Dizzy; Leith Ross, To Learn; Softcult, See You in the Dark; TALK, Lord of the Flies & Birds & Bees	
2025	Nemahsis	Verbathim	Luna Li, When a Thought Grows Wings; Peach Pit, Magpie; Ruby Waters, What's the Point; Valley, Water the Flowers, Pray for a Garden	
2026	Aysanabee	Edge of the Earth	Saya Gray, Saya; Yves Jarvis, All Cylinders; The OBGMs, Sorry, It's Over; PUP, Who Will Look After the Dogs?	
