= Kids (PUP song) =

Single by PUP

from the album Morbid Stuff
- Released: January 15, 2019
- Genre: Punk rock; pop-punk
- Length: 3:30
- Label: Rise; Little Dipper
- Songwriters: Stefan Babcock; Nestor Chumak; Zack Mykula; Steve Sladkowski
- Producer: Dave Schiffman

PUP singles chronology
"Old Wounds" (2017)	"Kids" (2019)	"Free at Last" (2019)

Music video
- "Kids" on YouTube

"Kids" is a song by Canadian punk rock band PUP, released on January 15, 2019, as the lead single from the group's third studio album, Morbid Stuff (2019). The band performed the song on Late Night with Seth Meyers in March 2019. They also did a Christmas Kids version of the song for CBC kids that premiered on December 10, 2019.

== Composition and release ==
PUP recorded their third studio album, Morbid Stuff, in May 2018 at Union Sound Company in Toronto. The album was produced by Dave Schiffman, who previously worked with the band on The Dream Is Over (2016) and PUP (2013), and engineered by Darren McGill. The band announced the details of their upcoming album in a zine, which included a 7" flexi disc of "Kids." The single was also released digitally on January 15, 2019, via Rise Records and Little Dipper.

"Kids" is written in the key of A-flat major, at a tempo of 157 beats per minute. In a press release accompanying the song, PUP lead singer Stefan Babcock explained that "Kids" is "about what happens when you stumble across the only other person on the face of this godless, desolate planet that thinks everything is as twisted and as fucked up as you do." In an interview with Rolling Stone, Babcock called "Kids" "the first love song I've ever written," and described it as being a song about "how fucking dogshit the world is and how [his girlfriend] has made it slightly less dogshitty."

== Release and reception ==
At the end of the year, Amazon Music placed "Kids" on their "Best Songs of 2019" playlist.

== Live performances ==
The band made their network television debut performing the song on Late Night with Seth Meyers in March 2019. Lead guitarist Steve Sadlowski said that Meyers requested "Kids" be the song performed on his show, saying he "was rocking out at his desk while we played."

On January 21, 2021, the band played "Kids," along with "Rot," "Reservoir," and "Scorpion Hill," as part of NPR Music's Tiny Desk (Home) Concerts series. The band played from Babcock's living room, with a carefully-placed piñata on a coffee table, and a handmade sign reading "Ceci n'est pas une tiny desk." On July 24, 2025, the band finally got to play in studio at NPR Music's Tiny Desk, and featured "Kids" in their setlist.

== Music video ==
The song's music video was released on January 30, 2019, and was directed by Jeremy Schaulin-Rioux. The clip takes place in the year 2059, and was described by Althea Legaspi of Rolling Stone as "bleak". "Our goal was to sorta set viewers up for this happy feel-good ending, and then at the last minute, crush them with darkness," Babcock explained.

Stereogum placed "Kids" at #18 in its list of the "20 Best Music Videos of 2019." In his summary, reviewer Tom Breihan said, "I can't even imagine how this got made, but I'm glad it did."
