= DVP (song) =

Single by PUP

from the album The Dream Is Over
- Released: January 26, 2016
- Genre: Punk rock; hardcore punk
- Length: 2:28
- Label: SideOneDummy; Royal Mountain
- Songwriters: Stefan Babcock; Zachary Mykula; Steven Sladkowski; Nestor Chumak
- Producer: David Schiffman

PUP singles chronology
"Dark Days" (2015)	"DVP" (2016)	"If This Tour Doesn't Kill You, I Will" (2016)

Music video
- "DVP" on YouTube

"DVP" is a song recorded by the Canadian punk rock band PUP for their second studio album, The Dream Is Over (2016). It was released as the lead single from The Dream Is Over on January 26, 2016 through Royal Mountain Records in Canada and SideOneDummy elsewhere. PUP first emerged in the early 2010s from Toronto, where they went by the name Topanga and acquired skill in DIY punk clubs. They played hundreds of concerts on the road per year, touring nonstop to support themselves. "DVP" is credited to each of the band members—Stefan Babcock, Zachary Mykula, Steven Sladkowski, Nestor Chumak—who recorded the track with producer David Schiffman in their hometown.

The fast-paced, energetic punk track follows a drunken narrator who refuses to grow up miserably attempting to repair a relationship. Babcock carries the vocals, alternating between shouting and harmonizing. The song's title comes from the Don Valley Parkway in Toronto, an expressway the narrator drunkenly speeds down. "DVP" was well-received by contemporary music critics, with many deeming it a highlight from The Dream is Over. Its music video, which repurposes dialogue from retro video games as song lyrics, saw wide acclaim.

== Background ==
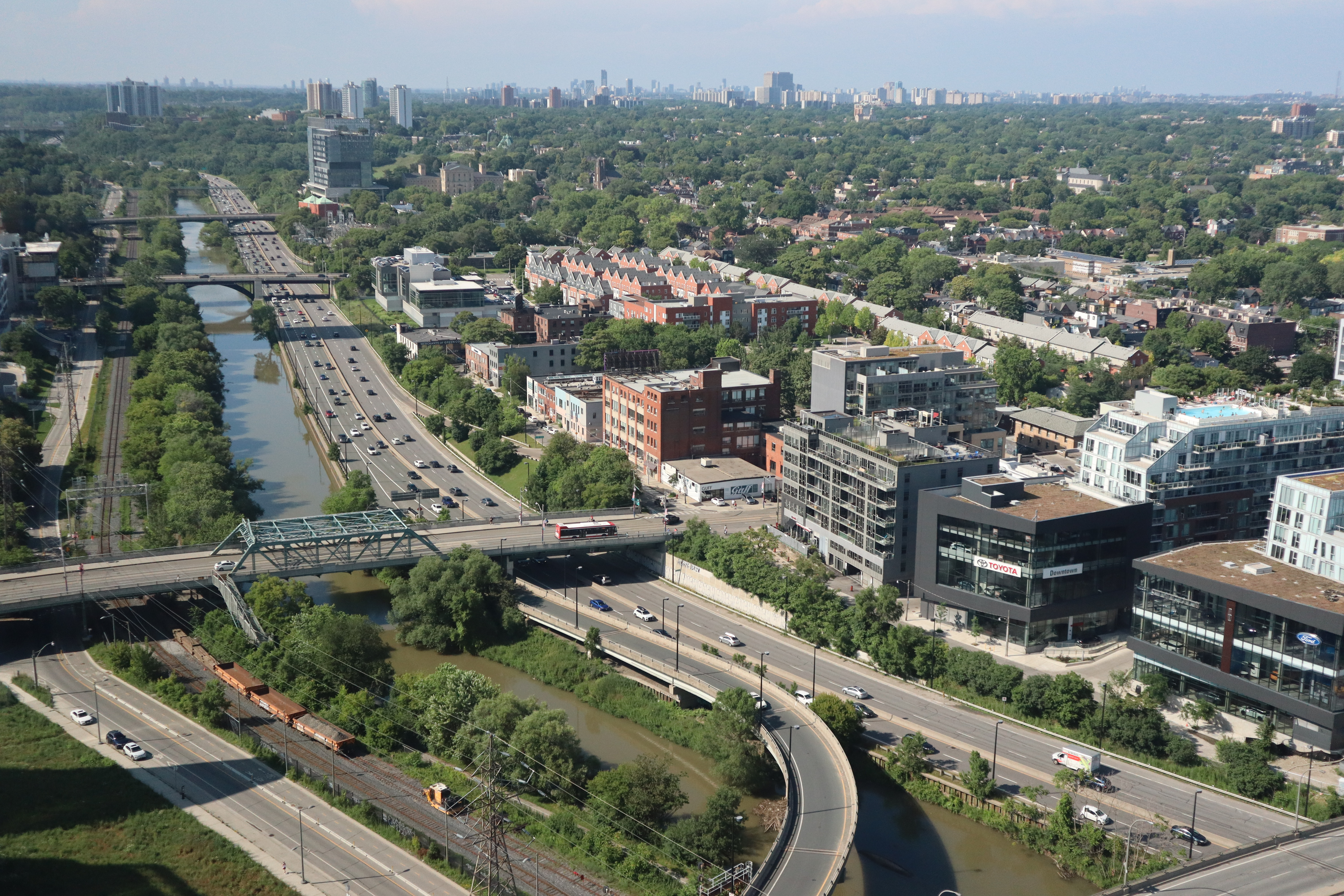
The song is named after the Don Valley Parkway, which the band has called "Toronto's shittiest highway".

The Toronto-based punk rock quartet PUP first rose to notoriety on the strength of their 2014 self-titled debut. The group became heavy travelers, playing 250 shows that year in support, touring with acts like Modern Baseball and Jeff Rosenstock. "DVP" is from The Dream is Over, the band's 2016 breakthrough sophomore effort, which solidified their standing in the modern punk canon.

The song segues from the album opener, titled "If This Tour Doesn't Kill You, I Will". Frontman Stefan Babcock sings of being intoxicated and conversational, desperately trying to reconcile with a girlfriend he feels he needs to mature. In the track, he depicts himself "doing 180 on the Don Valley Parkway," a municipal expressway in Toronto for which the song is named. Pushed to their breaking point, the narrator confesses that "nothing's working and the future's looking bleak" and admits they don't want to live nor die. The song ends with a joke, implying the narrator overindulges in Hawaiian Fruit Punch instead of alcohol. Babcock later regarded the song with a mixed view, feeling as though it glorifies bad habits; though he admitted he still loved the song, he noted it was written when he was 25 years old and "would never write a song like that" with gained perspective.

"DVP" was released through Royal Mountain in the band's native Canada, and via SideOneDummy Records elsewhere. The band first shared the song on Twitter on January 26, 2016.

== Music video ==
The song's music video was directed by Jeremy Schaulin-Rioux, a regular collaborator with the band who also helmed their "Guilt Trip" clip. The song is essentially a lyric video, reciting the song's words over edited clips of retro video games. "It's good to corrupt the things that corrupted us in the first place!" joked Schaulin-Rioux. The video games pulled from include ToeJam & Earl, Super Mario Bros. 3, Mortal Kombat, NBA Jam, Teenage Mutant Ninja Turtles, and The Terminator.

The music video was widely praised. Mark Beaumont from NME joked, "For gamers of a certain age, the new video for PUP's alcoholic's punk anthem 'DVP' is like watching your youth squandered on video games flash before your eyes." Eric Ducker at Rolling Stone wrote that "'DVP' brings humor and creativity to the uninspired world of lyrics videos by taking over sequences from cartridge-console video games." Jeremy D. Larson from Pitchfork ranked it among his favorite videos of its decade, "It looks deceptively basic but I’m guessing it was quite complicated to design. [...] It’s the most fun you can have watching words on a screen." Andrew Unterberger at Billboard raved it was an "immaculately conceived and executed lyric video," ranking it among the best clips of the 2010s.

== Reception ==
"DVP" received positive reviews from contemporary music critics. Ian Cohen at Pitchfork found the song thrilling, commenting that "'DVP' throttles forward at a breakneck pace, at least three choruses crashing together in a glorious pile-up of emotional wreckage." James Rettig at Stereogum felt the song represented the band's best, it "blending their hardcore and pop tendencies more seamlessly than ever before." A panel interpretation at PopMatters found reviewers mixed in their assessments, with Chad Miller finding it unappealing, and Jedd Beaudoin deriding, "There’s a fine line between stuff like this and polka." Hau Chu at The Washington Post considered the track a standout, while Efrain Dorado highlighted it for the Chicago Tribune, describing it as "an ode to stupid decisions and the following regret that can make you feel like a loser with no way out." Collin Brennan at Consequence listed it among the best punk songs of its year, calling it the "best and most straightforward song" on the band's second LP. Lars Gotrich at NPR called it "chaotically catchy [...] a willfully silly nod to adolescence instead of as a knowing wink."

The song has continued to receive acclaim over the years. In 2021, Spin columnist Bryan Rolli called it PUP's finest track, "the perfect distillation of jittery punk aggression, festival-ready gang vocals and hilariously self-destructive lyrics."

== Credits and personnel ==
Credits adapted from the liner notes for The Dream is Over.

Locations

- Recorded at Union Sound Company, Lincoln County Social Club, and TA2 Sound & Music in Toronto, Canada.
- Mastering at Howie Weinberg Mastering in Los Angeles, California.

Personnel

- Stefan Babcock – lead vocals, rhythm guitar
- Steve Sladkowski – lead guitar, backing vocals
- Nestor Chumak – bass, backing vocals, keyboards
- Zack Mykula – drums, backing vocals, percussion
- David Schiffman – producer, recording engineer, mixer
- Alex Gamble – assistant engineer
- John Dinsmore – assistant engineer
- Masumi Kaneko – assistant engineer
- Howie Weinberg – mastering engineer
