= Live Stuff =

Live album by Holly McNarland
- Released: February 9, 1999
- Recorded: 1998
- Genre: Rock
- Label: Universal Records
- Producer: Dale Penner

Holly McNarland chronology
Stuff (1997)	Live Stuff (1999)	Home Is Where My Feet Are (2002)

Live Stuff is a 1999 live album by Holly McNarland. The album is a compilation of recordings of McNarland's performances on June 6, 1998 in Las Vegas and July 15, 1998 at the Phoenix Concert Theatre in Toronto. It also includes a cover of Phil Collins' "In the Air Tonight" recorded in-studio.

== Track listing ==
1. "Water" (McNarland, Pullyblank)
2. "Numb" (McNarland)
3. "The Box" (McNarland)
4. "I Won't Stay" (McNarland)
5. "Elmo" (McNarland)
6. "Stormy" (McNarland)
7. "In the Air Tonight" (Collins)
