= The Dream Is Over (disambiguation) =

The Dream Is Over is a 2016 album by Canadian band PUP.

The Dream Is Over may also refer to:

- "The Dream Is Over", a song from Van Halen's 1991 album For Unlawful Carnal Knowledge
- "The Dream Is Over", a song from Mushroomhead's 2003 album XIII
