= Project Twinkle =

Project Twinkle may refer to:

- Project Twinkle, a U.S. Air Force study to investigate the mysterious Green fireballs of the late 1940s
- Project Twinkle (album), an album by King Cobb Steelie
