= King Cobb Steelie =

Canadian indie rock band

- Origin: Guelph, Ontario, Canada
- Genres: Indie rock, grunge
- Years active: 1991–present
- Labels: Raw Energy Records, EMI Canada, Outside Music
- Members: Kevan Byrne; Kevin Lynn
- Website: http://www.kingcobbsteelie.net/

King Cobb Steelie is a Canadian indie rock band formed in 1991 from Guelph, Ontario, and later based in Toronto. The band's most successful single was 1997's "Rational", from the album Junior Relaxer. Their music fuses elements of punk, grunge, funk, jazz, and dance. The core of the band is singer/songwriter Kevan Byrne and bassist Kevin Lynn. A variety of other collaborators, including Sam Cino, Al Okada, Gary Dutch, Geoff Walton, Steve Clarkson, Mike Armstrong, Nathan Lawr, Don Pyle, and Michelle McAdorey, have contributed to individual albums.

== History ==
In 1993, the band, named for a special kind of toy marble, released its self-titled album, which fused progressive rock with dubstep sampling. In 1994, the band was signed to the EMI label, and released the followup album Project Twinkle. The album received a Juno Award nomination for Alternative Album of the Year at the Juno Awards of 1995.

Following Project Twinkle, the band also performed a number of improvisational shows under the pseudonym Junior Relaxer, which would become the title of their third album in 1997. The album's lead single, "Rational", was the band's biggest hit, and garnered the band a MuchMusic Video Award nomination for Best Video at the 1997 MMVAs.

In 1999, as Junior Relaxer, the band gave a number of performances at Rancho Relaxo in Toronto.

Percussionist Robin Easton participated as drummer 14 in the Boredoms 77 Boadrum performance which occurred on July 7, 2007, at the Empire-Fulton Ferry State Park in Brooklyn, New York. That year King Cobb Steelie released an album, Destroy All Codes.

After several years of only occasional activity, the band played a 20th anniversary benefit show at Lee's Palace in Toronto, Ontario, on April 16, 2011, with proceeds going towards Ontario Hands & Voices, an organisation dedicated to supporting families with children who are deaf or hard of hearing. In the fall of 2012, the band re-released Project Twinkle on Pheromone Recordings and performed the album live in its entirety at the Horseshoe Tavern and at Van Gogh's Ear in Guelph as part of the Stay Out Of The Mall XI festival.

On December 12, 2013, King Cobb Steelie released Goodbye Arcadia, a four-track EP. This was their first new material in nine years. That year they performed a concert in Toronto as part of the Long Winter concert series.

In April 2022, member Mike Armstrong died from a cardiac event.

== Discography ==
- One's a Heifer b/w Duotang (1991)
- King Cobb Steelie (1993)
- Project Twinkle (1994)
- Junior Relaxer (1997)
- Mayday (2000)
- Destroy All Codes (2004)
- Goodbye Arcadia EP (2013)

== See also ==
- Music of Canada
- Canadian rock
- List of Canadian musicians
- List of bands from Canada
- Category:Canadian musical groups
