= This Place Sucks Ass =

EP by PUP
- Released: October 23, 2020
- Length: 17:19
- Label: Little Dipper / Rise

PUP chronology
Morbid Stuff (2019)	This Place Sucks Ass (2020)	The Unraveling of PUPTheBand (2022)

This Place Sucks Ass is an EP released by Canadian punk rock band PUP on October 23, 2020. It was released under two labels: Little Dipper (the band's personal label), and Rise Records.

== Development ==
This Place Sucks Ass contains mostly recordings from the studio sessions of the band's previous album, Morbid Stuff.

According to Pitchfork, "this place sucks ass" is a sentence the band used to say as a joke while touring, to describe the places where they played.

== Reception ==
The EP received generally favorable reviews. Pitchfork gave it a positive review, while Metacritic holds a score of 76/100.

UK rock music review website Kerrang! noted a lack of "vitality and vim" compared to Morbid Stuff.

Writing for Paste Magazine, Zach Schonfeld noted that the 17-minute EP compresses PUP's "infectious feel-bad energy" into five original tracks and a cover, assigning it a score of 7.8 out of 10.

The EP received a Juno Award nomination for Alternative Album of the Year at the Juno Awards of 2021.

== Track listing ==
All tracks are written by PUP (Stefan Babcock, Steve Sladkowski, Nestor Chumak and Zack Mykula) except "A.M. 180", written by Jason Lytle.

No.	Title	Length
1.	"Rot"	3:21
2.	"Anaphylaxis"	3:16
3.	"A.M. 180" (Grandaddy cover)	3:04
4.	"Nothing Changes"	3:26
5.	"Floodgates"	3:02
6.	"Edmonton"	1:10
Total length:		17:19

== Personnel ==
PUP

- Stefan Babcock – lead vocals, rhythm guitar
- Steve Sladkowski – lead guitar, backing vocals
- Nestor Chumak – bass guitar, backing vocals, engineering
- Zack Mykula – drums, percussion, backing vocals

Production

- David Schiffman – production, engineering, mixing
- Spencer Sunshine – engineering
- Darren McGill – engineering
- Michael Gnocato – engineering
- Harry Hess – mastering
- Brandon Lepine – artwork

== Charts ==
Chart (2020)	Peak position
Canadian Albums (Billboard)	72
US Billboard 200	198
US Heatseekers Albums (Billboard)	3
US Independent Albums (Billboard)	42
US Top Album Sales (Billboard)	24
US Top Alternative Albums (Billboard)	19
US Top Rock Albums (Billboard)	37
US Vinyl Albums (Billboard)	8
