= Holly McNarland =

Canadian musician, singer and songwriter (born 1975)

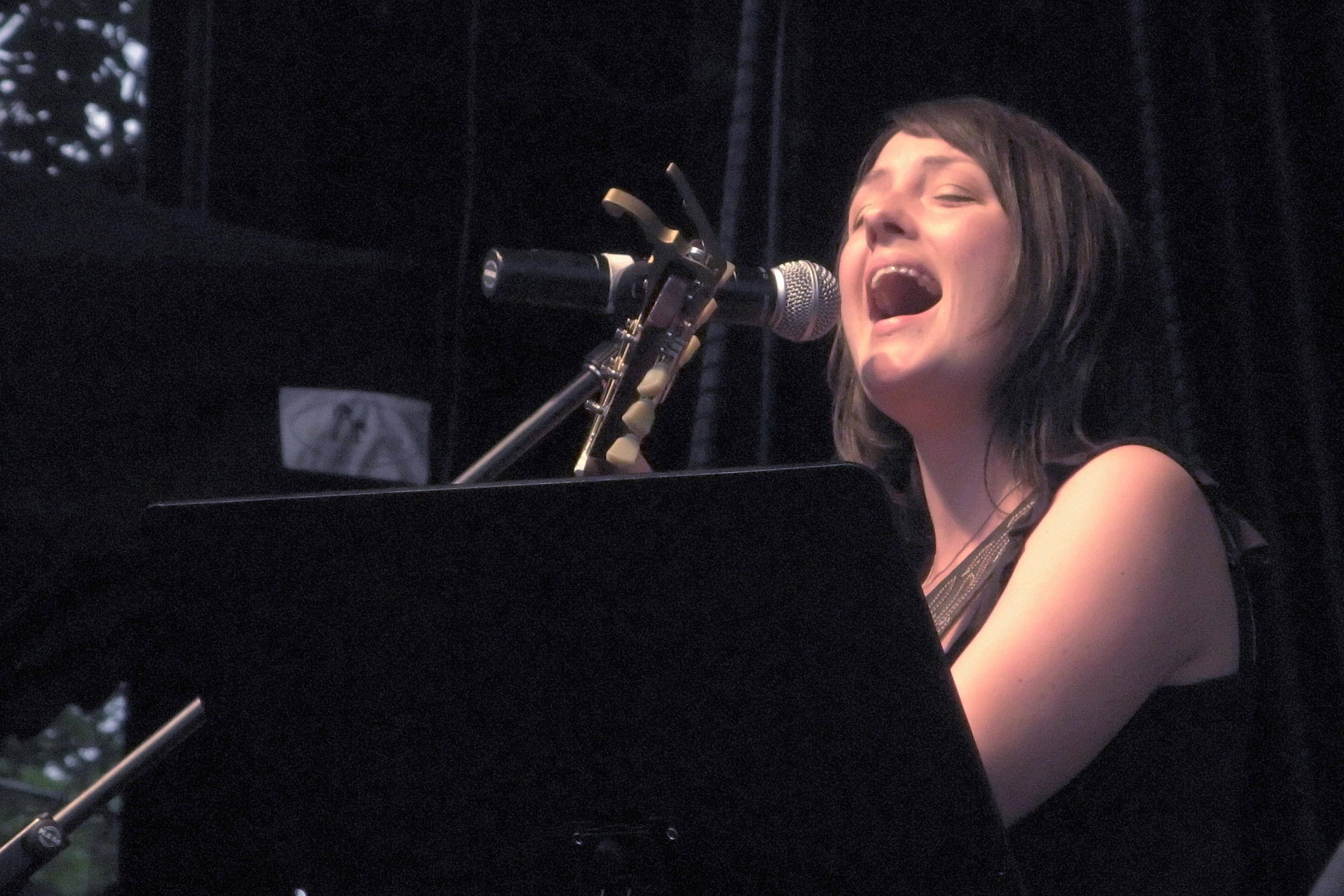
- McNarland in 2008

Background information
- Born: 23 October 1975 (age 50)
- Origin: Winnipeg, Manitoba
- Genres: alternative rock
- Occupation: singer-songwriter
- Years active: 1990s-present

Holly McNarland (born 23 October 1975) is a Canadian musician, singer and songwriter, prominent in the 1990s.

== Career ==
Originally from Winnipeg, Manitoba, McNarland's background is Métis. She moved to Vancouver, British Columbia in the early 1990s.

She released her debut EP Sour Pie independently in 1995, before it was rereleased nationally by MCA Records in 1996.

Stuff, her full-length debut album, was released in 1997. The album's most successful single was "Numb", which reached the Canadian top 10.

At the 1998 Juno Awards, she won the Best New Solo Artist category, and was nominated for Best Alternative Album for Stuff and Best Video for "Elmo".

She collaborated with Matthew Good on the song "Flight Recorder From Viking 7" from the album Loser Anthems.

Following Stuff, McNarland ended up taking an unplanned five-year hiatus from music after marrying videographer Jay Mirus and giving birth to her first child. She returned in with the album Home Is Where My Feet Are, released on June 11, 2002. The album was supported by a tour, with Emm Gryner performing as the opening act, and received several Western Canadian Music Award nominations in 2003 including Outstanding Pop Recording, Outstanding Producer (Malcolm Burn) and Outstanding Songwriter.

She then provided backing vocals on the track "Wishing You Would Stay" on The Tea Party's 2004 album Seven Circles, and again collaborated with Good on "Pony Boy", one of the new songs on his 2005 greatest hits package In a Coma. In 2004, she was also one of the performers at that year's National Aboriginal Achievement Awards.

She followed up in 2007 with the album Chin-Up Buttercup, and in 2012 with Run Body Run.

She collaborated with Matt Good once again on his cover of Kate Bush's song Cloudbusting on his 2015 album Chaotic Neutral.

== Discography ==
=== Studio albums ===
- Stuff (1997)
- Home Is Where My Feet Are (2002)
- Chin-Up Buttercup (2007)
- Run Body Run (2012)

=== Live and compilation albums ===
- Live at the Great Hall (DVD) (2003)
- The Komrade Sessions (iTunes release in 2006, digital release only)

=== EPs ===
- Sour Pie (1995, re-released in 1996)
- Live Stuff (1999)
- The Komrade Sessions (2006)

=== Singles ===
- "Mr. 5 Minutes" (1995)
- "Numb" (1997) – No. 9 CAN
- "Elmo" (1997)
- "Coward" (1998)
- "Beautiful Blue" (2002) - No. 25 CAN
- "Do You Get High?" (2002)
- "Losing My Face" (2002)
- "Watching Over You" (2003)
- "So Cold" (2003)
- "Every Single Time" (2007)
