= Duality (Luna Li album) =

2022 studio album

Studio album by Luna Li
- Released: March 4, 2022
- Label: In Real Life

Luna Li chronology
Jams (2021)	Duality (2022)	Jams 2 (2022)

Singles from Duality
- 1. "Star Stuff" Released: 2017; 2. "Trying" Released: February 20, 2020; 3. "Afterglow" Released: October 13, 2020; 4. "Cherry Pit" Released: March 9, 2021; 5. "Alone But Not Lonely" Released: May 14, 2021; 6. "Flower (In Full Bloom)" Released: September 28, 2021; 7. "Silver Into Rain" Released: February 3, 2022

Duality ratings
Review scores
Source	Rating
Beats Per Minute	73%
Loud and Quiet	7/10
Pitchfork	7.3/10
Still Listening	85/100

Duality is the debut album by Canadian pop musician Luna Li, released March 4, 2022, by In Real Life Music. The album was nominated for Alternative Album of the Year at the Juno Awards of 2023.

== Track listing ==
All tracks are written by Luna Li (credited as Hannah Bussiere Kim), except where noted.

Duality track listing
No.	Title	Writer(s)	Length
1.	"Cherry Pit"		4:52
2.	"Boring Again" (featuring Jay Som)	Hannah Bussiere Kim; Melina Duterte	2:58
3.	"Afterglow"		3:19
4.	"Trying"		3:27
5.	"Flower (In Full Bloom)" (featuring Dreamer Isioma)	Kim; Serena Isioma	3:51
6.	"Alone But Not Lonely"		1:46
7.	"Silver Into Rain" (featuring Beabadoobee)	Kim; Beatrice Laus	3:22
8.	"What You're Thinking"		3:29
9.	"Star Stuff"		2:56
10.	"Magic"		2:59
11.	"Misery Moon"		1:09
12.	"Space"		2:59
13.	"Lonely/Lovely"		3:52
Total length:			40:59
