= Sour Pie =

1995 EP by Holly McNarland

EP by Holly McNarland
- Released: 1995
- Genre: Rock
- Length: 22:31
- Label: Universal Music
- Producer: Dale Penner

Holly McNarland chronology
Sour Pie (1995)	Stuff (1997)

Professional ratings
Review scores
Source	Rating
AllMusic	3/5 stars

Sour Pie is a 1995 EP by Holly McNarland.

== Track listing ==
1. "Stormy" (McNarland, Isfeld)
2. "Dad & I" (McNarland)
3. "Cry or Cum" (McNarland)
4. "Sick Boy" (McNarland)
5. "Mr. 5 Minutes" (McNarland)
6. "I Won't Stay" (McNarland)
