= Who Will Look After the Dogs? =

Studio album by PUP
- Released: May 2, 2025
- Recorded: 2024
- Genres: Pop punk; punk rock
- Length: 35:50
- Labels: Little Dipper; Rise
- Producer: John Congleton

PUP chronology
The Unraveling of PUPTheBand (2022)	Who Will Look After the Dogs? (2025)

Singles from Who Will Look After the Dogs?
- 1. "Paranoid" Released: January 9, 2025; 2. "Hallways" Released: February 12, 2025; 3. "Get Dumber" Released: March 25, 2025; 4. "Olive Garden" Released: April 30, 2025

Who Will Look After the Dogs? is the fifth studio album by the Canadian punk rock band PUP. It was released on May 2, 2025, by the band's label Little Dipper and Rise Records. The album was preceded by four singles: "Paranoid", "Hallways", "Get Dumber" (featuring Jeff Rosenstock), and "Olive Garden".

To support the album, the group embarked on a co-headlining tour with Rosenstock and A Cataclysmic Rapture of Friendshipness, which started in September 2025.

The album was longlisted for the 2026 Polaris Music Prize.

== Background ==
Vocalist Stefan Babcock started writing for the album while in "a dark place" following a breakup that occurred shortly before the group's previous album, The Unraveling of PUPTheBand (2022), was released. Shortly after, he purchased a Teenage Engineering OP-1—a small synthesizer, sampler, and sequencer—which he used to musically experiment with genres like electro, hip hop, and power pop while travelling.

The title Who Will Look After the Dogs? comes from a line in "Hallways", which was "the very first thing" Babcock wrote for the album a week after The Unraveling of PUPTheBand was released. He ultimately wrote lyrics for thirty songs throughout its production, largely while staying in his isolated cabin in northern Canada. He credits this lack of socialization—along with routinely walking his dog, drawing comics, skateboarding, and psychedelic microdosing—for helping him stay focused on the album.

"Olive Garden", named after the American restaurant chain, originated as a demo with only acoustic guitar and vocals, but significantly changed when drummer Zack Mykula suggested that the group "should try and make it as heavy as possible". The lyrics are inspired by the group's frequent trips to the restaurant, which bassist Nestor Chumak called "a magical place", while touring the United States.

While house sitting for fellow musician Jeff Rosenstock, Babcock wrote and recorded the first demo of "Get Dumber" using Rosenstock's equipment and "always imagined [their] voices on this song together". "Get Dumber", along with "Hunger for Death" and "Best Revenge", stemmed from compositions Babcock made with the OP-1, although the original programming and arrangements were significantly altered in collaboration with the band.

== Recording ==
"On [The Unraveling of PUPTheBand], with Peter [Katis, producer], we were hyper-focused on playing everything perfectly, and if there was any space, we’d try and fill it with extra instrumentation or harmonies. This one, we really went back to the roots of being confident in the fact that we’re a really good live band, and we wanted to capture that spirit and energy."

— Babock on the group's approach to recording Who Will Look After the Dogs?

The album was recorded with John Congleton in Los Angeles over the course of three weeks in early 2024. Congleton, who also produced and mixed the album, "brought a lot of energy and fun" to recording sessions, encouraging the group to record ideas spontaneously and avoid overthinking. Guitarist Steve Sladkowski praised Congleton for "maintain[ing] that element of surprise" and keeping "warty and imperfect" elements on the final recordings.

The album was recorded with few takes and little overdubbing, with Babcock saying that the "majority [of songs are] one live take of us all playing in a room, and one take from bass and drums". Sladkowski frequently improvised guitar parts while balancing "the parameters that the band sets", and chiefly recorded using Congleton's Thurston Moore signature Fender Jazzmaster; he also utilized other Fender guitars and a Gretsch Country Gentleman. Babcock and Rosenstock recorded their vocals for "Get Dumber" simultaneously; on the first take, Rosenstock made Babcock laugh when he "forgot a line in the second verse and said 'ahhhhhh, lyrics' instead", which they kept when recording the second and final take.

== Release and promotion ==
"Paranoid", the first single, was released on January 9, 2025, with a music video directed by Jeremy Schaulin-Rioux and Clem Hoener depicting the band performing the song at Sneaky Dee's. PUP announced the album's release date and title on February 12, alongside the second single "Hallways" and its music video directed by Sterling Larose. Its third single, "Get Dumber" featuring Jeff Rosenstock, was released on March 25, along with a music video directed by group members Nestor Chumak and Zack Mykula. The same day, PUP and Rosenstock announced that they would be going on a co-headlining tour, A Cataclysmic Rapture of Friendshipness, beginning in September 2025.

On April 30, the fourth and final single from the album, "Olive Garden", was released. The following day, the group held an album release party in Toronto, where they decorated the Sound Garage venue to resemble an Olive Garden restaurant, serving as waiters and providing catered Italian food for attendees before performing six songs.

Who Will Look After the Dogs? was released on May 2, 2025, through PUP's Little Dipper label and Rise Records. In addition to their tour with Rosenstock, the group will embark on the six-show Mega-City Madness tour in July, performing at different venues in Toronto with Bad Waitress and Cadence Weapon as opening acts for different dates. The following month, they will perform seven shows in Australia and New Zealand.

== Critical reception ==
Professional ratings
Aggregate scores
Source	Rating
Metacritic	78/100
Review scores
Source	Rating
AllMusic	4/5 stars
DIY	4/5 stars
Dork	5/5
Exclaim!	8/10
Far Out	3/5 stars
Kerrang!	4/5
Louder Sound	4/5 stars
New Noise Magazine	5/5 stars
Rolling Stone	3.5/5 stars
Under the Radar	7.5/10 stars

Who Will Look After the Dogs? received generally positive reviews from music critics. At Metacritic, which assigns a normalised rating out of 100 to reviews from mainstream critics, the album received an average score of 78, based on nine reviews.

It was shortlisted for the Juno Award for Alternative Album of the Year at the Juno Awards of 2026.

== Track listing ==
All tracks are written by Stefan Babcock, Nestor Chumak, Zachary Mykula, and Steven Sladkowski.

Who Will Look After the Dogs? track listing
No.	Title	Length
1.	"No Hope"	1:59
2.	"Olive Garden"	1:52
3.	"Concrete"	3:03
4.	"Get Dumber" (featuring Jeff Rosenstock)	2:36
5.	"Hunger for Death"	3:10
6.	"Needed to Hear It"	3:50
7.	"Paranoid"	3:25
8.	"Falling Outta Love"	2:17
9.	"Hallways"	3:38
10.	"Cruel"	2:38
11.	"Best Revenge"	3:18
12.	"Shut Up"	3:59
Total length:		35:50

== Personnel ==
Credits adapted from the album's liner notes and Tidal.

=== PUP ===
- Stefan Babcock – lead vocals, guitar (all tracks); keyboards (track 5); piano, xylophone (11)
- Nestor Chumak – bass (all tracks), backing vocals (tracks 1, 3, 4, 6, 7, 11)
- Zack Mykula – drums, percussion (all tracks); backing vocals (tracks 1–4, 6–12), album layout
- Steve Sladkowski – guitar (all tracks), backing vocals (tracks 1, 3, 4, 6, 7, 11), keyboards (11)

=== Additional contributors ===
- John Congleton – production, recording, mixing
- Matt Colton – mastering
- Sean Cook – additional recording
- Sarah Tudzin – additional vocals (tracks 2, 8, 11, 12)
- Jeff Rosenstock – featured vocals (4), additional vocals (11)
- Itsallinsideus – album artwork

== Charts ==
Chart performance for Who Will Look After the Dogs?
Chart (2025)	Peak position
Australian Vinyl Albums (ARIA)	14
Canadian Albums (Billboard)	72
Scottish Albums (Official Charts)	19
UK Album Downloads (Official Charts)	32
UK Independent Albums (Official Charts)	7
UK Rock & Metal Albums (Official Charts)	3
US Top Album Sales (Billboard)	12
US Vinyl Albums (Billboard)	7
