= DillanPonders =

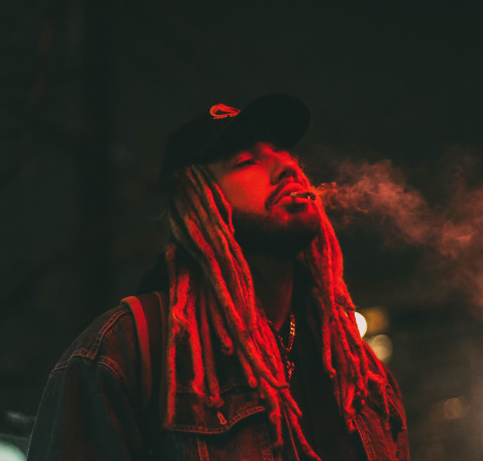

Background information
- Born: Dillan Alexander Richard King; November 11, 1991 (age 34); Toronto, Ontario, Canada
- Genres: Hip hop; trap
- Occupations: Rapper; singer
- Instrument: Vocals
- Years active: 2011–present
- Label: SmashMouth
- Website: www.dillanponders.co

Dillan Alexander Richard King (born November 11, 1991) known professionally by his stage name DillanPonders, is a Canadian rapper from Toronto, Ontario. Ponders has performed across North America, as part of festivals like SXSW, Mondo. NYC and on the Smoker's Club tours, as well as alongside some of hip hop's left field leaders, including Flatbush Zombies, Pouya and Father. He's been featured in some of the genre's top publications, including Complex, Noisey, XXL and has headlined Spotify's Northern Bars and Hip Hop Central playlists.

== Musical career ==
=== 2011–13: Career beginnings, Dopamine, Overdose and NUMB ===
DillanPonders started writing and recording songs professionally in 2011, a year later he released his first body of work titled Dopamine, an 18-tracks album which was released on June 10, 2012. In November 2012, he released Comatose, an EP he is credited to have also engineered and mix and mastered. March 1, 2013 saw DillanPonders release LUST, his third project, under Creative REbels World.

Through Creative REbels, he released Overdose, a mixtape that was well received and won the first Rkulture "Mixtape of the Year" award in 2013. The mixtape literarily highlights the experiences of DillanPonders and his growth as a songwriter. It features production credits from BiirdxLahghost, BlackOut, HOLYDAY, Kaos, LEF7Y, MindBlown, MYCbeats, Protishead, and Runsbeatz. The mixtape also credits guest appearances from Aay Cee, ADAN, Guapo and T.City. In October, DillanPonders revealed the album cover of his trap-infused mixtape titled NUMB. Described as a "gem of rap music" by Christian Courtois of IX Daily, the mixtape was executively produced by Tay Lewis and was released on 13 November under SmashMouth Music Group.

=== 2014–15: The Boy Who Lived, You're Welcome and Retox ===
DillanPonders started recording his sophomore album The Boy Who Lived in April 2014. On August 4, RESPECT. premiered "SmashMouth CReW Gang" and "Swallow", two drug-themed lead singles from the album. In an interview with Vice, he revealed that the album is "about me knowing when to go hard and when not to" following questions raised around his use of drugs and smoking of marijuana. Upon the release of the 10-track album which features a sole appearance from British singer Ziba, it was met with critical acclaim from mainstream hip hop music critics. RKuture's Brandon Benguaich described the album as "magical" and "what we have been waiting for"; while Kevin Ahmadi agreed that it is "perfect for a debauched party playlist".

On 1 April 2015, he released the first installment of his You're Welcome mixtape, a remix project which served as a teaser for his EP Retox. In anticipation of the EP, he released two singles titled "Stamina" which made the cut into Retox and "Circus" which featured vocals from Omari Shakir. Through SmashMouth Music Group, he finally released Retox in October to positive critical reception after the release of his popular song "Shroom Daddy".

=== 2016–2018: Acid Reign, Acid Jazz and No Mans Land ===
On 20 May 2016, DillanPonders dropped a single titled "Go Daddy Go", off his critically acclaimed project Acid Reign, before releasing another single titled "Mandem" in anticipation of the album. DillianPonders enlisted the services of Eestbound to produce "Heaven", a song he sees as a "representation of where me and my squad are at mentally".

On 29 December, he released ACID REIGN to positive reviews. The 12-track album featured on Boi-1da's "Top 50 Toronto Releases of 2016". Leandre Nawej of Exclaim! rated the project 7 stars out of 10 while Kevin Ritchie of Now rated it 3 out of 5 stars. Six songs from the album were used on the Acid Jazz EP, a collaboration between Ponders and JAZZ MONEY that mixed Ponders's raps with live instrumentation.

In spring 2017, Ponders hit the road supporting Pouya and Fat Nick, opening to sellout crowds across Ontario and Quebec. He also released "PLANET PONDERS", which quickly hit 300,000 Spotify streams, and "Doubts", which was picked up by Complex Canada as one of the spring's top tracks.

Ponders released his most recent project, No Mans Land, in August 2017. Riding its popularity, he headlined his first show in New York City in October.

=== 2018–2021: The Boy Who Died, Knowhere and Because We're Alive ===
Through 2018 & 2019, DillanPonders released two projects: The Boy Who Died and Knowhere. The Boy Who Died closed the loop on Ponders' 2014 The Boy Who Lived project, and represented a musical and personal evolution for Ponders. Through Knowhere, Ponders further expanded his international attention, particularly through the track "JURASSIC" which featured IDK, one of the hottest rappers of 2019.

In fall 2020, DillanPonders announced a new album and dropped its first single: "Jungle" featuring Métis singer/songwriter Ruby Waters. The video was met with positive reviews, particularly in Canada, the United States and Australia, being featured in CBC Music, Lyrical Lemonade, and other publications. Ponders' new album title and date is yet to be announced but expected in late 2020.

=== 2022–2025: New Music Every Week ===
In August 2022, Dillan started releasing one song every week and has been doing so until this very day He has been compiling those weekly releases into albums such as Album Mode Vol. 2 , 28 Grams , Album Mode Vol. 3 , Album Mode Vol. 4 and Album Mode Vol. 5 and plans to continue releasing one song a week for the next decade.

=== 2025–PRESENT: World Record Holder ===
On February 26, 2025 DillanPonders received the Guinness World for the most consecutive single released by a music act

== Discography ==
Year	Album title	Album details
2012	Dopemine	Released: June 10, 2012; Label: Independent; Formats: Digital download
2012	Comatose	Released: November 23, 2012; Label: Independent; Formats: Digital download
2013	LUST	Released: March 1, 2013; Label: Creative REbels World; Formats: Digital download
2013	Overdose	Released: May 16, 2013; Label: Creative REbels World; Formats: Digital download
2013	NUMB	Released: November 13, 2013; Label: SmashMouth Music Group; Formats: Digital download
2014	The Boy Who Lived	Released: August 13, 2014; Label: SmashMouth Music Group; Formats: CD, digital download
2015	You're Welcome	Released: April 1, 2015; Label: SmashMouth Music Group; Formats: Digital download
2015	Retox	Released: October 30, 2015; Label: SmashMouth Music Group; Formats: Digital download
2016	You're Welcome 2	Released: June 24, 2016; Label: SmashMouth Music Group; Formats: Digital download
2016	ACID REIGN	Released: December 28, 2016; Label: SmashMouth Music Group; Formats: Digital download
2017	Acid Jazz	Released: July 17, 2017; Label: SmashMouth Music Group; Formats: Digital download
2017	No Mans Land	Released: August 30, 2017; Label: SmashMouth Music Group; Formats: Digital download
2018	The Boy Who Died	Released: November 21, 2018 Label: SmashMouth Music Group Formats: Digital Download
