= The Unraveling of PUPTheBand =

Studio album by PUP
- Released: April 1, 2022
- Genre: Punk rock
- Length: 35:44
- Label: Little Dipper; Rise
- Producer: Peter Katis

PUP chronology
Morbid Stuff (2019)	The Unraveling of PUPTheBand (2022)	Who Will Look After the Dogs? (2025)

Singles from The Unraveling of PUPTheBand
- 1. "Waiting/Kill Something" Released: November 9, 2021; 2. "Robot Writes a Love Song" Released: January 18, 2022; 3. "Matilda" Released: March 1, 2022; 4. "Totally Fine" Released: March 22, 2022

The Unraveling of PUPTheBand (stylized in all caps) is the fourth album by Canadian punk rock band PUP, released on April 1, 2022, through Rise Records and Little Dipper, the band's personal label. The album was accompanied by the Canadian, American, and European tour PUP Returns. The album's cover artwork was illustrated by Jordan Speer.

== Background ==
PUP released their third studio album, Morbid Stuff on April 5, 2019, via Little Dipper and Rise Records. During the COVID-19 pandemic, all scheduled events were interrupted, and the band released the EP This Place Sucks Ass on October 23, 2020.

Single "Waiting/Kill Something" was released on November 9, 2021, with "Waiting" set to be the seventh track on the album. The band announced The Unraveling of PUPTheBand alongside the single release of "Robot Writes a Love Song" on January 18, 2022. "Matilda" was released on March 1, 2022, one month before the album release. The album's fourth single, "Totally Fine", was released on March 22, 2022, along with a music video which showcases the band being put on trial.

Their first show since the start of the pandemic took place on March 23, 2022, in Toronto.

The album was longlisted for the 2022 Polaris Music Prize.

== Reception ==
Professional ratings
Aggregate scores
Source	Rating
Metacritic	83/100
Review scores
Source	Rating
AllMusic	4/5 stars
Clash	9/10
Kerrang!	4/5
NME	4/5 stars
Pitchfork	7.8/10

The Unraveling of PUPTheBand was met with "universal acclaim" from music critics according to Metacritic. At Metacritic, which assigns a normalized rating out of 100 to reviews from mainstream critics, The Unraveling of PUPTheBand has an average score of 83 based on 11 reviews.

== Track listing ==
All tracks are written by PUP.

The Unraveling of PUPTheBand track listing
No.	Title	Length
1.	"Four Chords"	2:07
2.	"Totally Fine"	3:43
3.	"Robot Writes a Love Song"	3:36
4.	"Matilda"	3:51
5.	"Relentless"	4:34
6.	"Four Chords Pt. II: Five Chords"	0:27
7.	"Waiting"	3:10
8.	"Habits"	3:58
9.	"Cutting Off the Corners"	4:07
10.	"Grim Reaping"	2:57
11.	"Four Chords Pt. III: Diminishing Returns"	0:09
12.	"PUPTheBand Inc. Is Filing for Bankruptcy"	3:05
Total length:		35:44

== Personnel ==
PUP

- Stefan Babcock – lead vocals, rhythm guitar
- Zack Mykula – drums, backing vocals, percussion
- Steve Sladkowski – lead guitar, backing vocals
- Nestor Chumak – bass, backing vocals

Technical

- Peter Katis – production, recording, mixing
- Greg Calbi – mastering
- Greg Giorgio – recording
- Kurt Leon – additional recording
- Erik Paulson – assistant engineering
- Jake Gray – assistant engineering

Additional musicians

- Thomas Bartlett – additional keyboards
- Peter Katis – additional keyboards
- Sarah Tudzin – additional vocals on "Relentless"
- Melanie Gail St-Pierre – additional vocals on "Totally Fine"
- Kathryn McCaughey – additional vocals on "Waiting"
- Erik Paulson – additional vocals on "Cutting Off the Corners" and "Grim Reaping"
- Marie Goudy – trumpet on "Four Chords" and "Grim Reaping"
- Paul Tarussov – trombone on "Grim Reaping"
- Colin Fisher – saxophone on "PUPTheBand Inc. Is Filing for Bankruptcy"

== Charts ==
Chart performance for The Unraveling of PUPTheBand
Chart (2022)	Peak position
Australian Albums (ARIA)	67
Canadian Albums (Billboard)	56
Scottish Albums (OCC)	11
UK Album Downloads (OCC)	34
UK Independent Albums (OCC)	3
US Billboard 200	134
US Independent Albums (Billboard)	19
US Top Alternative Albums (Billboard)	16
US Top Rock Albums (Billboard)	22
