= Ruby Waters =

Canadian singer-songwriter

- Born: Ruby Komisar; July 20, 1997 (age 29); Shelburne, Ontario, Canada
- Genres: Folk; rock; indie pop
- Instruments: Vocals; acoustic guitar
- Years active: 2018–present
- Website: https://rubywatersmusic.com/

Ruby Waters (born Ruby Komisar; July 20, 1997) is a Canadian singer-songwriter.

Waters grew up in Shelburne, Ontario. Her parents, Peter Komisar and Debbie Bechamp, were in a country band together and introduced her to music at an early age. She began busking and performing in bars around the age of 13.

Waters first attracted attention when a video of her performing her debut single "Sweet Sublime" became popular on Reddit. She followed up with the singles "Supernatural" and "Last Cigarette", and toured as an opening act for City and Colour on their 2019 tour, before releasing her debut EP Almost Naked.

She released her second EP, If It Comes Down to It, in 2020. In the same year she was featured on "Jungle", a track by rapper DillanPonders.

Her single "Blow" was released in 2021, and was named the 29th best Canadian song of the year in CBC Music's year-end charts for 2021. She performed in October 2021 at the Osheaga Festival's "Get Together" edition.

She received a Juno Award nomination for Alternative Album of the Year at the Juno Awards of 2022 for If It Comes Down to It.
