= Junior Relaxer =

Studio album by King Cobb Steelie
- Released: August 1997
- Genre: Indie rock, jazz fusion
- Label: EMI Canada
- Producer: Guy Fixsen

King Cobb Steelie chronology
Project Twinkle (1994)	Junior Relaxer (1997)	Mayday (2000)

Professional ratings
Review scores
Source	Rating
Allmusic	link

Junior Relaxer is the third album by Canadian alternative rock band King Cobb Steelie, released in 1997. The album's main single "Rational", a tribute to Nigerian activist Ken Saro-Wiwa, was the band's biggest hit.

Prior to the album's release, the band had played several live shows of improvisational music using Junior Relaxer as a pseudonym.

Guest musicians on the album include Kinnie Starr, Nic Gotham, DJ Serious and Don Pyle.

== Track listing ==
1. Starvo
2. Pass the Golden Falcon
3. Rational
4. Functions and Relations
5. Power of Love
6. Champion of Versatility
7. You Should Be Getting Something
8. Highly Conductive
9. Doomed Thinking Man vs. Stupid Action Man
10. Swiss Crumb
11. Quo Vadis
12. Irrational (Incarnate Perspective)
