= Dizzy (band) =

Canadian indie pop band

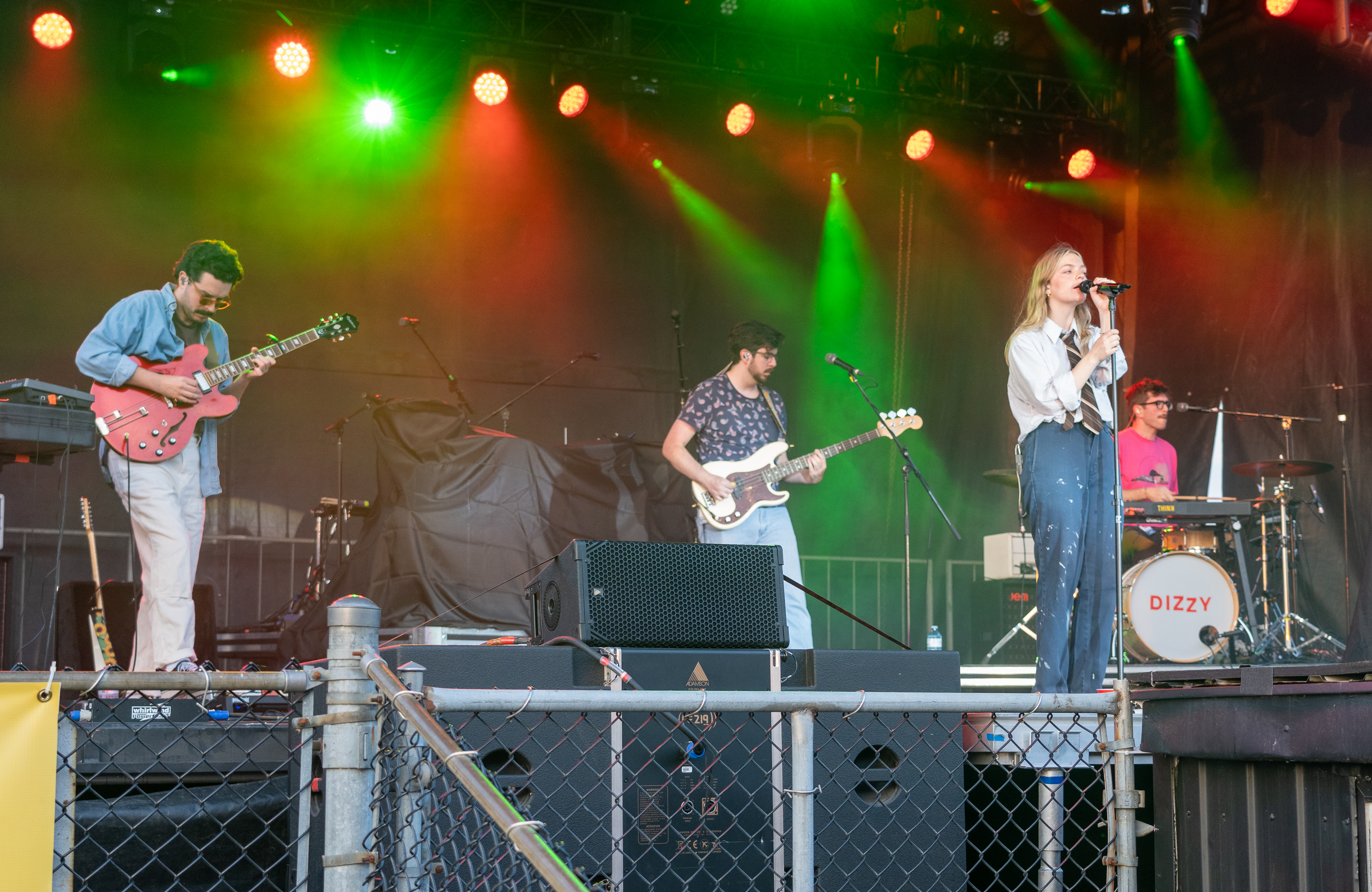
- Dizzy performing in 2023

Background information
- Origin: Oshawa, Ontario, Canada
- Genre: Indie pop
- Years active: 2015–2024 (Note: Indefinite hiatus.)
- Label: Royal Mountain
- Members: Katie Munshaw; Alex Spencer; Mackenzie Spencer; Charlie Spencer
- Website: www.dizzy-music.com

Dizzy is a Canadian indie pop band from Oshawa, Ontario, whose debut album Baby Teeth won the Juno Award for Alternative Album of the Year at the Juno Awards of 2019.

Consisting of vocalist Katie Munshaw and instrumentalists Alex, Mackenzie and Charlie Spencer, the group released Baby Teeth in 2018. The Spencers are brothers. The album was promoted with a concert tour in Canada, the United States and Europe, and the tracks "Swim", "Pretty Thing" and "Backstroke" were released as singles. In addition to the Alternative Album of the Year category, the group were also nominated for Breakthrough Group of the Year.

On February 26, 2020 Dizzy released the single "Sunflower", and on July 31, 2020, the band released their second album, The Sun and Her Scorch. The album received another Juno Award nomination for Alternative Album of the Year at the Juno Awards of 2021.

On March 29, 2023, Dizzy announced their third studio album Dizzy, which was released on August 18, 2023. The album received their third Juno nomination for Alternative Album of the Year at the Juno Awards of 2024.

== Band members ==
- Katie Munshaw – lead vocals
- Alex Spencer – guitar
- Mackenzie Spencer – bass, vocals
- Charlie Spencer – drums, synthesizer, guitar, vocals

== Discography ==
=== Studio albums ===
List of studio albums, with release date and label shown
Title	Details
Baby Teeth	Released: August 17, 2018; Label: Royal Mountain; Formats: CD, LP, digital download
The Sun and Her Scorch	Released: July 31, 2020; Label: Royal Mountain; Formats: CD, LP, digital download, streaming
Dizzy	Released: August 18, 2023; Label: Royal Mountain; Formats: CD, LP, digital download, streaming

==== Extended plays ====
List of EPs, with year released and label shown
Title	Details
Heavy / Twist	Released: July 12, 2019; Label: Royal Mountain; Formats: Digital download, streaming
Basement Covers	Released: November 13, 2020; Label: Royal Mountain; Formats: Digital download, streaming
Separate Places	Released: June 11, 2021; Label: Royal Mountain; Formats: Digital download, streaming

=== Singles ===
List of singles, with year released and album shown
Title	Year	Album
"Stars and Moons"	2017	Baby Teeth
"Swim"	2017	Baby Teeth
"Pretty Thing"	2018	Baby Teeth
"Joshua"	2018	Baby Teeth
"Backstroke"	2018	Baby Teeth
"Twist"	2019	Heavy / Twist
"Heavy"	2019	Heavy / Twist
"Sunflower" (original or Muna remix)	2020	The Sun and Her Scorch
"The Magician" (original or LA Priest remix)	2020	The Sun and Her Scorch
"Roman Candles"	2020	The Sun and Her Scorch
"Beatrice"	2020	The Sun and Her Scorch
"The Bird Behind the Drapes"	2021	Separate Places
"Barking Dog"	2022	Dizzy
"Birthmark"	2023	Dizzy
"Open Up Wide"	2023	Dizzy

== Awards and nominations ==
Year	Awards	Category	Nominee / work	Result
2019	Juno Award	Breakthrough Group of the Year	Dizzy	Nominated
2019	Juno Award	Alternative Album of the Year	Baby Teeth	Won
2021	Juno Award	Alternative Album of the Year	The Sun and Her Scorch	Nominated
2024	Juno Award	Alternative Album of the Year	Dizzy	Nominated
