= King Cobb Steelie (album) =

Studio album by King Cobb Steelie
- Released: 1993
- Label: Raw Energy Records

King Cobb Steelie chronology
King Cobb Steelie (1993)	Project Twinkle (1994)

Professional ratings
Review scores
Source	Rating
Allmusic	4/5 stars

King Cobb Steelie is the self-titled debut album by King Cobb Steelie, released in 1993 on Raw Energy Records.

== Track listing ==
1. "Bundt"
2. "Jackasshole"
3. "Duotang"
4. "Dangerous Dangling Arm"
5. "Talking GI Joe with Lifelike Beard and Hair and Kung-fu Grip"
6. "Time=Money & Money=Pizza ∴ Time=Pizza."
7. "Luckily I Keep My Feathers Numbered for Just Such an Emergency"
8. "Juggernaut"
9. "Shucked"
10. "The Big Small Syndrome"
11. "Tomato/Tomahto"
12. "Bar Mitzvah in Ann Arbor"
13. "Extra Mild"
14. "One's a Heifer"
15. "Deadly Lampshade"
16. "Kuehe Mit Fangzaehnen"
