= PUP (band) =

Canadian punk rock band

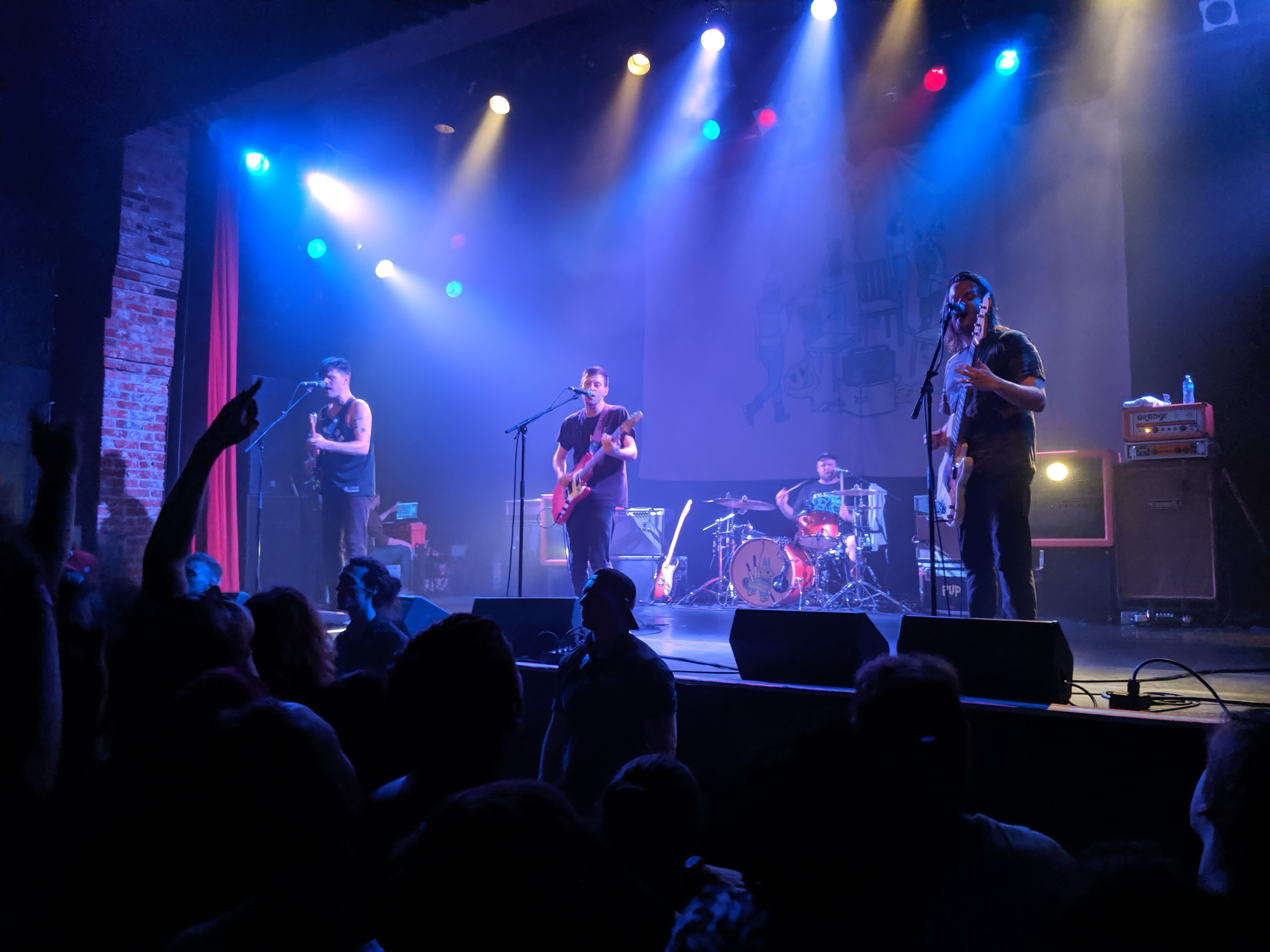
- PUP performing at Bogart's in 2019. From left to right: Steve Sladkowski, Stefan Babcock, Zack Mykula, and Nestor Chumak

Background information
- Also known as: Topanga
- Origin: Toronto, Ontario, Canada
- Genres: Punk rock; hardcore punk; pop-punk
- Years active: 2010–present
- Labels: Rise; Little Dipper; Royal Mountain; SideOneDummy
- Members: Stefan Babcock; Nestor Chumak; Zack Mykula; Steve Sladkowski
- Website: puptheband.com
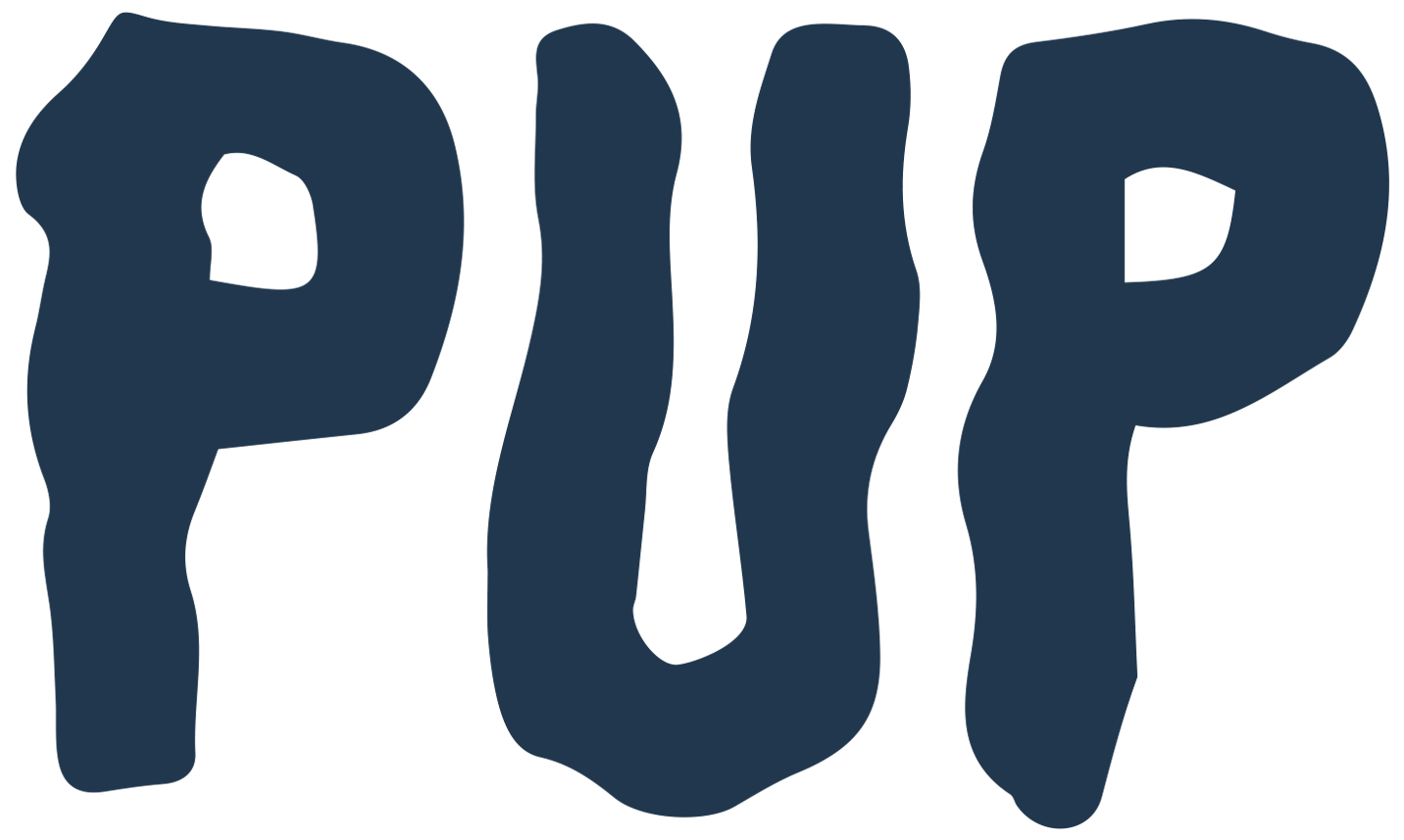

PUP (abbreviation for Pathetic Use of Potential) is a Canadian punk rock band formed in Toronto, Ontario in 2010, originally under the name Topanga.

PUP's debut album PUP was released on October 8, 2013, on Royal Mountain Records. In December 2013, PUP signed with SideOneDummy Records and re-released their debut album in the United States on April 8, 2014. The group was in the studio in late 2015 recording their second album The Dream Is Over which was released on May 27, 2016, through SideOneDummy. The band's third album, titled Morbid Stuff, was released on April 5, 2019. This Place Sucks Ass, a six-track EP, was released on October 27, 2020. Their fourth album, The Unraveling of PUPTheBand, was released on April 1, 2022. Their fifth album, Who Will Look After the Dogs?, was released on May 2, 2025.

== History ==
=== Origins and formation (2010) ===
Bassist Nestor Chumak, guitarist Steve Sladkowski, and drummer Zack Mykula are childhood friends who attended school in Toronto together. Two of them met in third grade, and the third met them in high school at Humberside Collegiate Institute. Throughout their childhood, they played in a number of bands together. Vocalist and guitarist Stefan Babcock also grew up playing in bands in Toronto. During high school, Babcock was the lead guitarist for a ska band called Stop Drop N Skank that he formed with some of his classmates at Earl Haig Secondary School. Babcock encountered Chumak, Sladkowski, and Mykula on occasion at local Toronto music venues, but was not close with them at the time.

After high school, Babcock's band Stop Drop N Skank dissolved. While attending Ryerson University, he worked with Nestor Chumak to record a song he had written for a school project. Following its completion, the duo teamed up with Chumak's friends Sladkowski and Mykula to form a group called Topanga. The name comes from Topanga Matthews (née Lawrence), a character on the 1990s Disney sitcom Boy Meets World whom the band has called "our first middle-school crush." They decided to record a four-track EP together, although Babcock says that at the time, they considered this a one-off project and didn't think of themselves as a "real band". Topanga EP (later retitled Lionheart EP) was released as a free download on December 7, 2010.

=== Early days as a band (2011–2013) ===
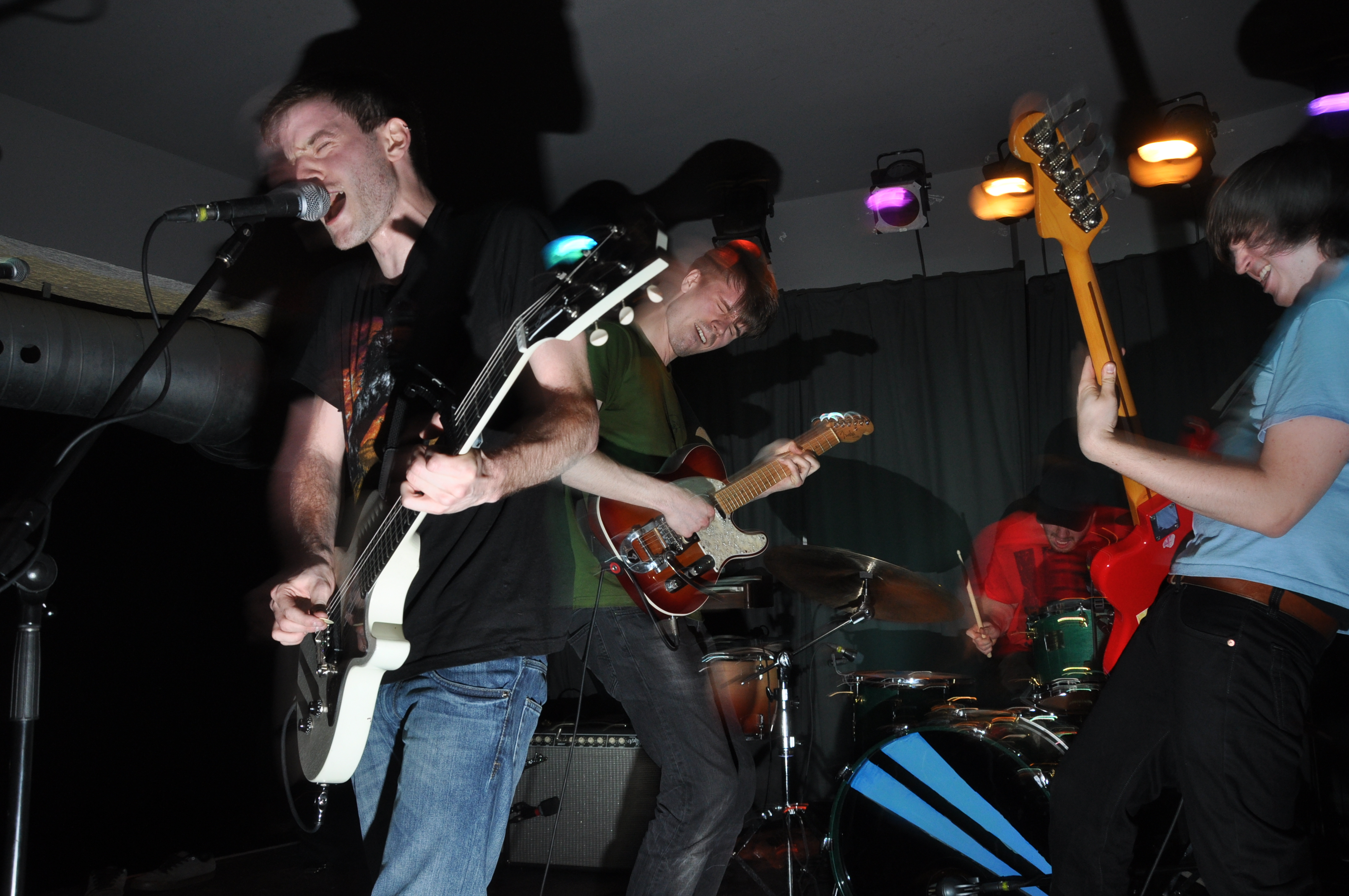
Topanga performing at a bar in Ottawa in 2012

Shortly after the release of their debut EP, the band began performing live together. They played their first show ever at the Bovine Sex Club in January 2011. According to Babcock, the EP was gaining traction online, and they began receiving increasingly better show offers. By the beginning of 2012, they had begun touring with Hollerado and were signed to Hollerado's label, Royal Mountain Records. On February 15, 2012, they released the two-track Oceans 7" with Royal Mountain.

In 2012, Topanga began contemplating making their first full-length album, and wanted to find a producer who could help them capture their heavy performance style in a studio recording. Inspired by The Bronx's 2008 self-titled album, they were interested in working with its producer, Dave Schiffman, an industry veteran who had worked with artists such as Rage Against the Machine, Weezer, and Anti-Flag. They sent him a demo and, to their elation, he liked it and soon flew to Toronto to begin working on their album. The album was recorded in Montréal, in a studio that belongs to professional former F1 driver Jacques Villeneuve.

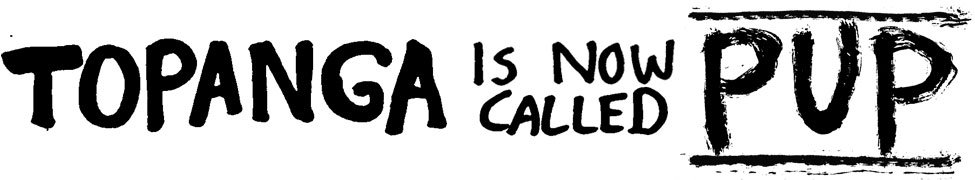
A banner from Topanga's Bandcamp site announcing the new name and logo

While working on the album, the band decided to change their name from Topanga to something else. According to Babcock, they felt the name was less fitting now that they had locked down a heavy punk rock style (as opposed to the lighter rock style they had played early on). In addition, Disney had announced a new spinoff series based on Boy Meets World, and the band didn't want to be associated with it. After a few months of uncertainty, they decided on the name PUP. The name is an acronym of a quote by Babcock's grandmother, who said that playing in a rock band was a "pathetic use of potential". The band officially announced their new name via social media on April 16, 2013.

=== PUP (2013–2015) ===
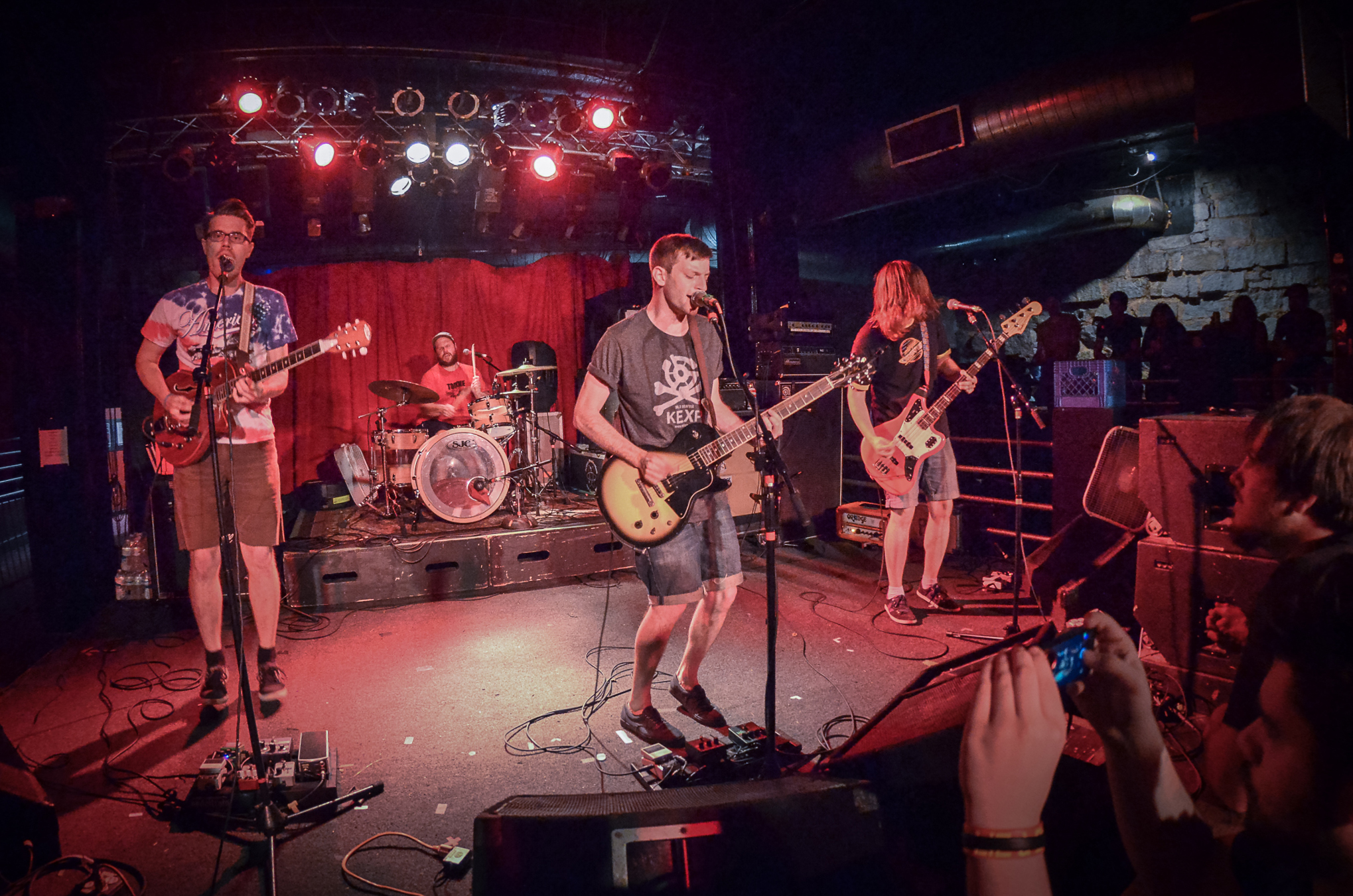
PUP performing at The Masquerade in Atlanta in 2014

Having begun recording with Schiffman, the band announced their upcoming album would release on October 8, 2013. From September to the end of November 2013, PUP joined Hollerado and the Zolas on a 24-stop tour across Canada to promote the album. Upon its release, the self-titled debut album, PUP, was met with critical acclaim. The Calgary Herald named PUP one of Canada's best new bands, and Stereogum listed them as one of the top 40 new bands of 2013. PUP won two Bucky Awards from CBC Radio 3 for Best Live Show and Best New Artist in 2013, and was nominated for Best Video.

In December 2013, PUP signed with SideOneDummy Records and re-released their debut album in the United States on April 8, 2014. In 2014, they went on their first tour of the UK, playing 8 shows around the country with the UK band Slaves. The first two shows of the tour in London were part of the NME Awards tour. After that they played South By Southwest in Austin, Texas, followed by several more London shows and the Groezrock festival in Belgium. In May they started an extensive tour of the US with the Menzingers, Lemuria and Cayetana, playing 32 shows in 39 days. In August they opened for the Hives in London, England, and then played at Reading and Leeds Festivals. In September 2014, they made their first appearance on Riot Fest at Chicago and Toronto.

In late 2014, PUP completed its first head-lining tour of Canada and the US, culminating in a sold-out concert at Toronto's Lee's Palace featuring a "next level" performance. In early 2015, PUP completed a multi-city tour of Australia, supporting The Smith Street Band. PUP then participated in the 2015 Vans Warped Tour, joining the tour for the month of July, including a highly anticipated date in Toronto, the band's hometown and place where the band has enjoyed success. This was the band's first time playing the Molson Amphitheatre. Between October and December 2015, the group supported Modern Baseball on their headlining US tour.

=== The Dream Is Over (2016–2018) ===
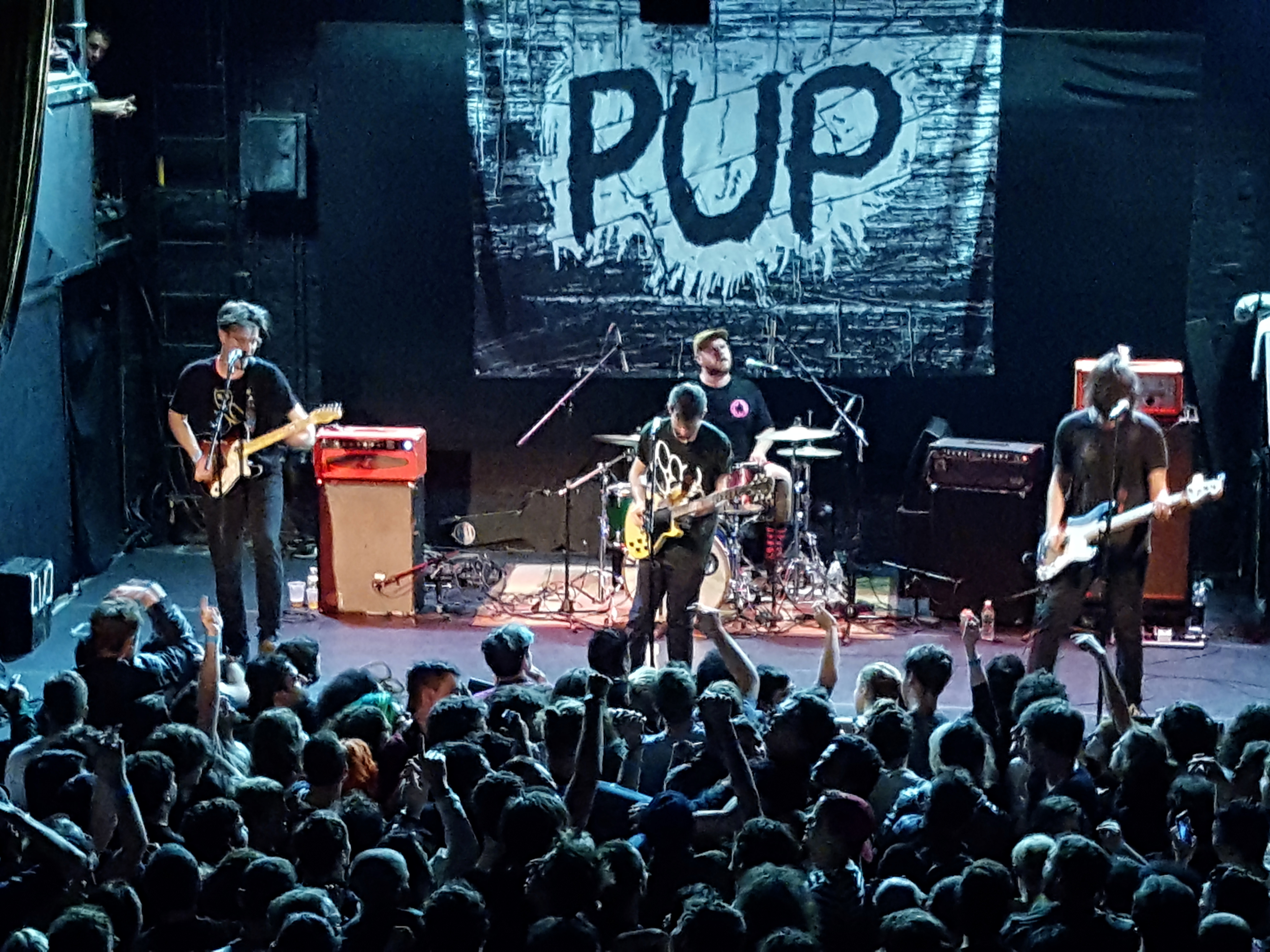
PUP performing at the Bowery Ballroom in New York City, October 2016

In early 2016, PUP headlined a very select number of shows in New York City. They also released a new track, "DVP", from their second album, The Dream Is Over.

On May 27, 2016, PUP released The Dream Is Over through SideOneDummy. According to the band, the title is a direct quote from Babcock's doctor after damaging his vocal cords.

PUP toured the US, Canada, Australia and Europe in 2016 on a headlining tour entitled "If This Tour Doesn't Kill You, I Will", which is also the name of the first track on the album. In early 2017, PUP headlined European shows with The Wonder Years and Tiny Moving Parts. During spring and summer 2017, they made appearances at several music festivals, including Shaky Knees, Boston Calling, WayHome, Lollapalooza, and Osheaga.

In September 2017, PUP made their cable television debut on Last Call with Carson Daly on NBC, performing "Sleep in the Heat" and "If This Tour Doesn't Kill You, I Will / DVP".

In January 2018, PUP joined The Menzingers along with Cayetana on their headlining UK/Europe tour.

=== Morbid Stuff (2018–2019) ===
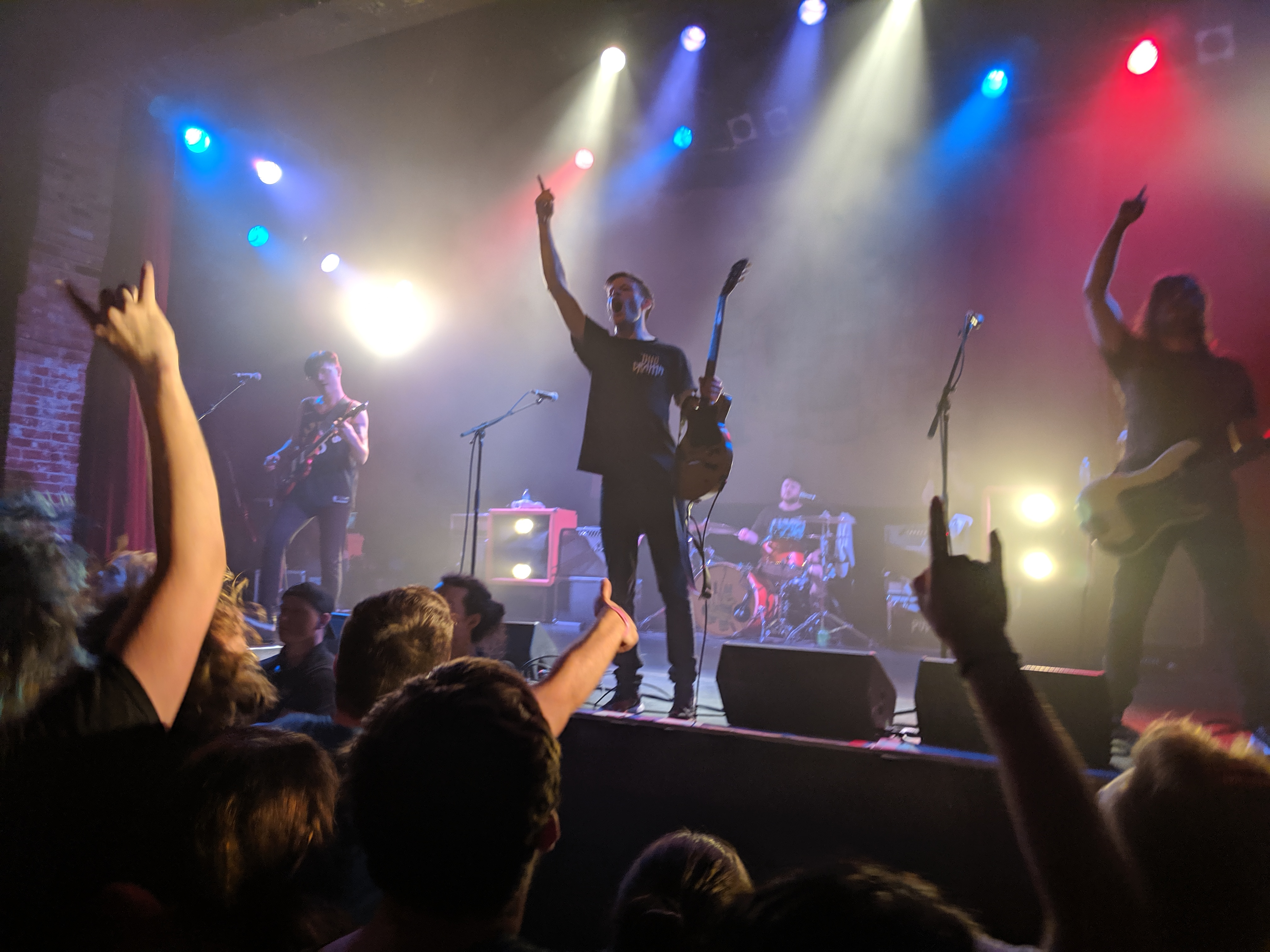
PUP performing on their Morbid Stuff Tour-Pocalypse at Bogart's in May 2019

In May 2018, the band announced that they had finished tracking their third album in Toronto with Dave Schiffman and Darren McGill. Towards the end of 2018, the band released a zine entitled "Pup the Zine Vol. 1" containing a comic book and a flexi-disc for a live version of "My Life Is Over and I Couldn't Be Happier".

In January 2019, the band released Pup the Zine Vol. 2 complete with a flexi-disc featuring a new single, "Kids", that they mailed out to fans over the course of the month. The zines additionally contained a press release and release date for the band's third album, Morbid Stuff, which was due on April 5, 2019. The second single from the album, "Free at Last", was released on February 27, 2019, and featured guest vocals from Eva Hendricks of Charly Bliss. The band performed "Kids" on Late Night with Seth Meyers on March 21, 2019, in anticipation of release of Morbid Stuff. Later in March 2019, the band released two new songs, "Scorpion Hill" and "Sibling Rivalry".

=== The Unraveling of PUPTheBand (2020–2025) ===
On July 3, 2020, the band released a live album available on Bandcamp for one day only, titled Live at the Electric Ballroom. In August 2020, the band released a cover of "A.M. 180", off of Grandaddy's debut album, Under the Western Freeway. In September 2020, the band announced that a new six-track EP, This Place Sucks Ass, would be released on October 23. Along with the announcement they released one of the tracks from the EP, "Rot".

In December 2020, PUP collaborated with the New York-based band Charly Bliss on a Christmas song titled "It's Christmas and I Fucking Miss You". The bands also released an accompanying music video for the song. The band contributed a cover of the Metallica song "Holier Than Thou" to the charity tribute album The Metallica Blacklist, released in September 2021. On November 9, 2021, PUP released two new singles, "Waiting" and "Kill Something".

On January 18, 2022, PUP announced their fourth studio album, The Unraveling of PUPTheBand, which was released on April 1, 2022. They also released a single from the album, "Robot Writes a Love Song", and an accompanying music video. The band announced they would be performing as an opening act for Sum 41's final tour in January 2025.

=== Who Will Look After The Dogs? (2025–present) ===
A day prior to beginning a slot opening for Sum 41 on their final tour, the band released the single "Paranoid" on January 9, 2025. On February 12, 2025, the band released the second single "Hallways". "Get Dumber", featuring Jeff Rosenstock was released on March 25 along with the announcement of a co-headlining US tour beginning in September 2025. The fourth and final single, "Olive Garden", was released on April 29 along with announcing a Canadian tour beginning in November 2025.

PUP released their fifth studio album, Who Will Look After the Dogs?, on May 2, 2025. PUP performed six subsequent shows in various venues across Toronto, as part of their "Mega-City Madness Tour" in July 2025.

Who Will Look After the Dogs? was selected as one of the 40 best Canadian albums of 2026 and long-listed for the Polaris Music Prize.

== Musical style ==
PUP has been described primarily as a punk rock band. They have also been labeled under punk rock subgenres such as pop-punk, hardcore punk, post-hardcore, and as indie rock. The band also experimented with pop elements on The Dream is Over.

In interviews, band members have self-identified PUP as a punk rock band.

== Acclaim and awards ==
PUP has enjoyed critical success, having been nominated or won in major Canadian contests such as the Juno Awards, the Polaris Music Prize, the CBC Bucky Awards, among others. Their first single "Reservoir" was nominated for a SOCAN Song-writing Prize. It was also used on gameplay footage shown at the Electronic Entertainment Expo 2016 for the game Watch Dogs 2.

PUP won two Bucky Awards from CBC Radio 3 for Best Live Show and Best New Artist in 2013, as well as a nomination for Best Video. PUP's first album was long-listed for the prestigious Polaris Music Prize of 2014. The national newspaper The Globe & Mail called them out as front-runners in the contest along with Arcade Fire, Mac DeMarco, BadBadNotGood, among other artists. PUP has been nominated for three Juno Awards. In 2015, PUP was nominated for Recording Package of the Year and Video of the Year for "Guilt Trip." In 2016, PUP was nominated again for Video of the Year for "Dark Days."

Rolling Stone listed the "Canadian punkers" of PUP as one of 2014's "breakout rock acts." Jeremy Schaulin-Rioux was nominated for the 2016 Prism Prize for Music Video of the Year for "Dark Days".

PUP achieved commercial success with the release of their second album, The Dream Is Over, on May 27, 2016, with chart achievement recognition from Billboard in several categories including Canadian Albums, Alternative Albums, Heatseekers, Independent Albums, Top Rock Albums, and Top Album Sales. In July 2016, The Dream is Over was nominated to the short-list of the Polaris Music Price 2016. Rolling Stone also listed the "Sleep in the Heat" music video as #4 of the "10 Best Music Videos of 2016."

"DVP" and "Sleep in the Heat" were nominated for the 2017 Prism Prize for Music Video. In July 2017, PUP won SOCAN Songwriting Prize for "DVP." In March 2018, PUP was nominated for the Prism Prize for the video for "Old Wounds."

In July 2019, Morbid Stuff was nominated for the 2019 Polaris Music Prize. In February 2020, music videos "Kids" and "Free at Last" were longlisted for the Prism Prize.

In June 2020, Morbid Stuff won the Juno Award for Alternative Album of the Year at the Juno Awards of 2020. This Place Sucks Ass was nominated in the same category at the Juno Awards of 2021, and Who Will Look After the Dogs? was a finalist at the Juno Awards of 2026.

Who Will Look After the Dogs? was longlisted for the 2026 Polaris Music Prize, and the song "Hunger for Death" was shortlisted for the SOCAN Polaris Song Prize.

== Band members ==
- Stefan Babcock – lead vocals, rhythm guitar
- Steve Sladkowski – lead guitar, backing vocals
- Nestor Chumak – bass, backing vocals, keyboards
- Zack Mykula – drums, backing vocals, percussion

== Discography ==
Releases marked with † were published as Topanga.

=== Studio albums ===
- PUP (2013), Royal Mountain, SideOneDummy
- The Dream Is Over (2016), Royal Mountain, SideOneDummy
- Morbid Stuff (2019), Little Dipper, Rise
- The Unraveling of PUPTheBand (2022), Little Dipper, Rise
- Who Will Look After the Dogs? (2025), Little Dipper, Rise

=== Extended plays ===
- Lionheart EP (2010) † – digital (originally titled Topanga EP)
- Oceans (2012) † – CD
- This Place Sucks Ass (2020) – CD, vinyl LP, digital

=== Live releases ===
- Audiotree Live (2015) – digital
- Live at The Electric Ballroom (2020) – digital, recorded November 20–21, 2019
- PUP Unravels Live in Front Of Everyone They Know (2022) – digital
- Megacity Madness (The Official Live Recordings) (2026) - vinyl LP

=== Singles ===
- "Oceans" (2012) † – 7" (B-side: "Mabu")
- "Reservoir" / "My Shadow (Jay Reatard cover)" (2014) – 7"
- "You Don't Get Me High Anymore (Triple J Like A Version)" (2017) – digital, Phantogram cover
- "My Life Is Over and I Couldn't Be Happier" (2018) – live 7"
- "Kids" (2019) – 7"
- "Bloody Mary, Kate and Ashley" (2019) – 7"
- "Bare Hands (demo)" (2019) – 7" (B-side: "Edmonton")
- "Skateboarding Is A Crime And You Should Be In Jail" (2020) – 7"
- "Anaphylaxis" (2020)
- "A.M. 180" (2020) – Grandaddy cover
- "Rot" (2020)
- "It's Christmas and I Fucking Miss You" (with Charly Bliss) (2020)
- "Waiting/Kill Something" (2021)
- "Robot Writes a Love Song" (2022)
- "Matilda" (2022)
- "Totally Fine" (2022)
- "How To Live With Yourself/Smoke Screen" (2023)
- "Paranoid" (2025)
- "Hallways" (2025)
- "Get Dumber" (with Jeff Rosenstock) (2025)
- "Olive Garden" (2025)

=== Music videos ===
- "Reservoir" (2013)
- "Lionheart" (2014)
- "My Shadow (Jay Reatard cover)" (2014)
- "Guilt Trip" (dir. Jeremy Schaulin-Rioux/Chandler Levack, feat. actor Finn Wolfhard playing Young Stefan Babcock, 2014)
- "Mabu" (2014)
- "Back Against the Wall" (2015)
- "Dark Days" (dir. Jeremy Schaulin-Rioux/Chandler Levack, 2015)
- "DVP" (2016)
- "If This Tour Doesn't Kill You, I Will." (2016)
- "Sleep in the Heat" (dir. Jeremy Schaulin-Rioux, feat. actor Finn Wolfhard playing Young Stefan Babcock, 2016)
- "Old Wounds" (2017)
- "Kids" (2019)
- "Free at Last" (2019)
- "Sibling Rivalry" (dir. and anim. by Martin MacPherson, 2019)
- "See You At Your Funeral" (2019)
- "Anaphylaxis" (2020)
- "It's Christmas and I Fucking Miss You" (2020)
- "Robot Writes a Love Song" (2022)
- "Matilda" (dir. Jefferson Dutton 2022)
- "Totally Fine" (2022)
- "Paranoid" (2025)
- "Hallways" (2025)
- "Get Dumber" (2025)
- "Olive Garden" (2025)
- "Concrete" (2026)

== See also ==
- Music of Canada
- Canadian rock
