= Numb (Holly McNarland song) =

1997 single by Holly McNarland

Single by Holly McNarland

from the album Stuff
- Released: June 12, 1997
- Length: 3:57
- Label: Universal Music
- Songwriter: Holly McNarland
- Producer: Dale Penner

Holly McNarland singles chronology
"Mr. 5 Minutes" (1995)	"Numb" (1997)	"Elmo" (1997)

"Numb" is a song by Canadian musician Holly McNarland, released as the lead single from her debut studio album, Stuff. The song was very successful in Canada, peaking at number nine on the RPM 100 Hit Tracks chart and number five on the RPM Alternative 30.

== Track listing ==
European CD single

1. "Numb"
2. "Mr. Five Minutes"
3. "Stormy"

== Charts ==
=== Weekly charts ===
Chart (1997)	Peak position
Canada Top Singles (RPM)	9
Canada Rock/Alternative (RPM)	5

=== Year-end charts ===
Chart (1997)	Position
Canada Top Singles (RPM)	76
