= Mayday (King Cobb Steelie album) =

Studio album by King Cobb Steelie
- Released: October 3, 2000
- Genre: Electronic
- Length: 44:46
- Label: Rykodisc (USA); Cooking Vinyl (UK); Outside Music (Canada)

King Cobb Steelie chronology
Junior Relaxer (1997)	Mayday (2000)	Destroy All Codes (2004)

Professional ratings
Review scores
Source	Rating
Allmusic	3/5 stars

Mayday is the fourth studio album by Canadian alternative rock band King Cobb Steelie, released in 2000 on Outside Music.

Crash Vegas lead Michelle McAdorey sings on the album's title track, for which she also received a writing credit.

== Track listing ==
All songs by Kevan Byrne, Kevin Lynn and Michael Armstrong except where noted.

1. "The Situation"
2. "Below The Stars"
3. "Home"
4. "The Stinger"
5. "Mayday" (Eric Chenaux, Kevan Byrne, Kevin Lynn and Michael Armstrong, Michelle McAdorey)
6. "Fast Money Blessing"
7. "Lady Toronto"
8. "Half-Bit Converter"
9. "Drowning"
10. "Ivan 87"
11. "Skyscraper"
