= Luna Li =

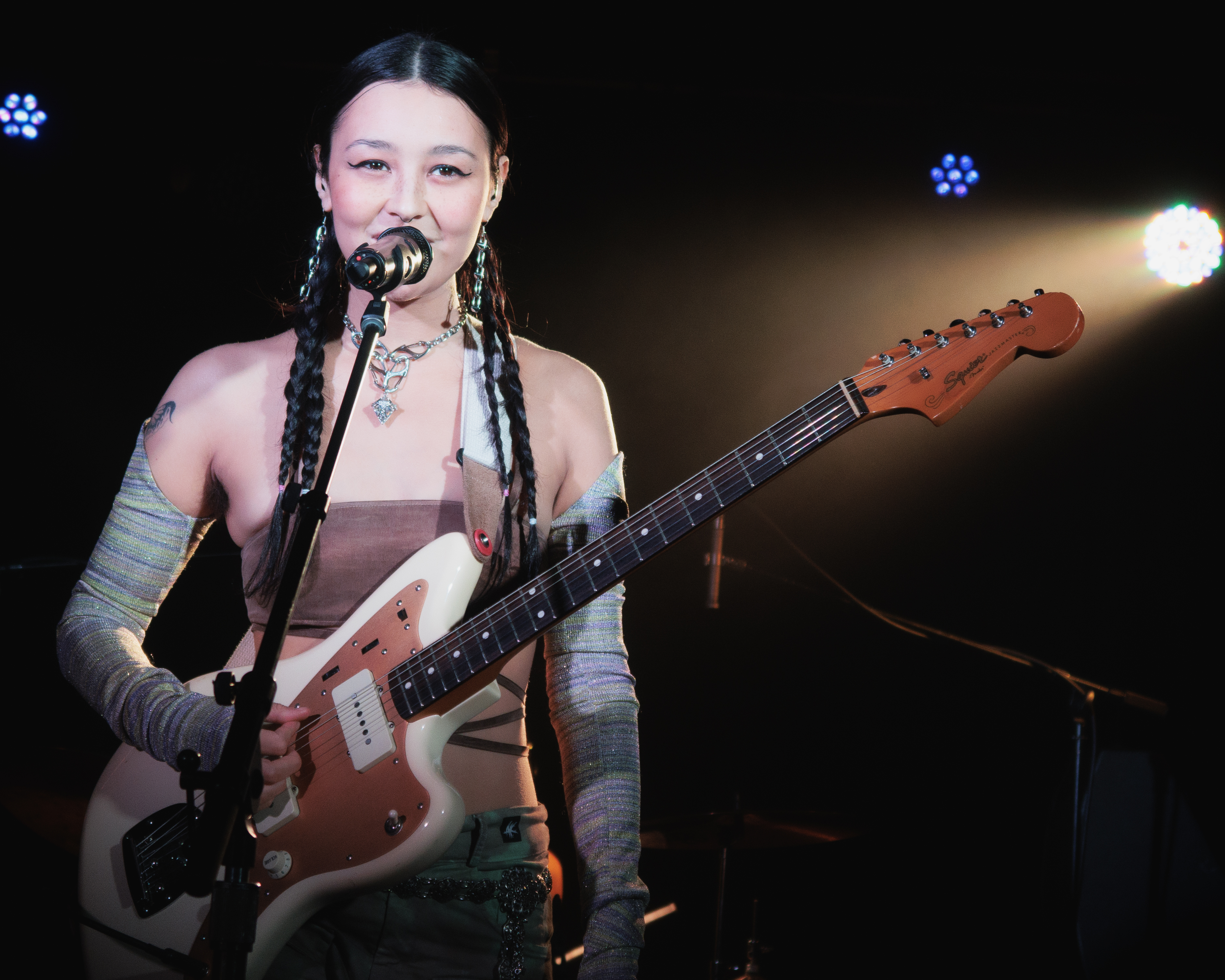
- Luna Li in October 2022

Background information
- Born: Hannah Bussiere Kim; October 3, 1996 (age 30); Toronto, Ontario, Canada
- Genres: Bedroom pop; dream pop; chamber pop; indie pop; indie rock
- Instruments: Vocals; guitar; keyboards; bass; drums; violin; harp; flute; gayageum
- Years active: 2015–present
- Labels: AWAL Recordings; In Real Life Music
- Website: www.lunali.ca

Hannah Bussiere Kim (born October 3, 1996), better known by her stage name Luna Li, is a Toronto-based singer, songwriter, multi-instrumentalist, and producer. During the early months of the COVID pandemic, Kim rose to prominence after a series of videos of her home-performed multi-instrumental jam sessions, featuring her playing the harp, keyboard, guitar, and violin, became viral on social media.

Kim began writing music as "Veins", and released the record Moon Garden in 2015. As "Luna Li", she self-released her debut extended play Opal Angel in 2017. After signing to AWAL Recordings and In Real Life, she released the jams extended play, a compilation of the viral jam sessions she composed during the pandemic, in 2021. Her debut record as Luna Li, Duality, was released on AWAL (Canada) and In Real Life (in the rest of the world) in 2022. She released her second album in 2024: When a Thought Grows Wings.

== Early life ==
Kim was born and raised in Toronto, Ontario. She is of Korean-Canadian heritage and cites her background as a major influence on her songwriting.

Kim grew up with classical training in piano and violin, eventually also becoming proficient in harp, electric guitar, bass, and drums. She attended Classical Music Conservatory in Toronto, where her mothers are co-directors. She originally attended McGill University in Montreal to study violin, but dropped out after a semester to pursue her own songwriting and to start her own rock band in the Toronto music scene. According to Kim, “When I was first starting out, I thought, ‘Rock and roll is cool, the violin is not.’”

== Career ==
=== 2014–2017: Veins ===
In 2014, Kim started the garage rock group "Veins", the name of which came from a poem written during high school. After returning from Montreal to Toronto in 2015, she concurrently attended Seneca College's one-year Independent Music Production program, graduating in 2016. While Veins was initially conceived as a personal project, the group grew into a six-member live band that performed at local venues in Toronto and Montreal. In May 2015, the group's debut album Moon Garden was released on Bandcamp. Though they had not reached out to media, the record received a warm reception from press and reviewer outlets. In January 2017, they played their last show under the name Veins. According to Kim, the group had intended to change their name since 2016, partly since “everyone thought Veins would be like a metal or a dark hard rock band, which it wasn't.” She and her bandmates eventually decided on ‘Luna Li’, which fit the natural imagery and themes in her songwriting and production.

=== 2017–present: Luna Li ===
As Luna Li, Kim self-released her first EP, Opal Angel, in 2017. In February 2020, Kim released a new song titled "Trying". Kim released another new song, "Afterglow", in August 2020. In February 2021, Kim released her second EP, titled "Jams EP". Kim released a new song titled "Cherry Pit" in March 2021. Kim's next single, "Alone But Not Lonely", was released in May 2021.

In September and October 2021, Kim embarked on a tour opening for Japanese Breakfast. In May 2022, Luna Li appeared on Saturday Night Live as a violinist for Japanese Breakfast.

Kim released her debut album Duality, in 2022 to positive reviews. She followed it up later in the year with the EP Jams 2.

She toured with Wolf Alice, opening for them in fall 2022, before embarking on a headline tour.

On May 15, 2024, Kim announced her second album, When a Thought Grows Wings, with release set for August 23 by In Real Life and AWAL.

== Awards ==
In 2017, Luna Li won the SOCAN Foundation Award for Young Canadian Songwriters with her single Star Stuff, from the Opal Angel EP.

Luna Li's debut album, Duality, was nominated for a Juno Award under the Alternative Album of the Year category in 2023.

One of the songs from Duality, Silver Into Rain (Ft Beabadoobee), earned Luna Li the 2023 SOCAN Songwriting Prize.

== Discography ==
=== Albums ===
- Duality (2022)
- When a Thought Grows Wings (2024)

=== EPs ===
==== Opal Angel (2017) ====
All tracks are written by Luna Li.

No.	Title	Length
1.	"Opal Angel"	2:34
2.	"Need A Lil' Love"	3:10
3.	"Star Stuff"	2:57
4.	"Ghosting"	2:37
Total length:		11:18

==== Jams EP (2021) ====
All tracks are written by Luna Li.

No.	Title	Length
1.	"Cloud Castle"	1:03
2.	"Flower"	0:48
3.	"Baby Shred"	1:49
4.	"Float"	1:01
5.	"Harp Jam"	0:58
6.	"2516"	1:08
7.	"Staying In"	0:42
8.	"Mirror"	1:00
9.	"Kount Challenge"	0:46
10.	"Fairy"	0:54
Total length:		10:09

==== Jams 2 EP (2022) ====
All tracks are written by Luna Li.

No.	Title	Length
1.	"Daydream"	1:09
2.	"Borders (Ft Aaron Paris)"	0:44
3.	"Periwinkle"	0:54
4.	"Butterflies (Ft Amaria)"	0:58
5.	"Omnichord Jam"	0:41
6.	"Skiptracing Lullaby"	1:02
Total length:		5:28
