= PUP (album) =

Studio album by PUP
- Released: October 8, 2013
- Recorded: Studio Mixart in Montreal, Quebec and Orange Lounge in Toronto, Ontario (additional recording)
- Genre: Punk rock; hardcore punk; post-hardcore; indie punk; pop punk
- Length: 34:24
- Label: Royal Mountain
- Producer: Dave Schiffman

PUP chronology
| PUP (2013) | The Dream Is Over (2016) |

Professional ratings
Aggregate scores
| Source | Rating |
|---|---|
| Metacritic | 83/100 |
Review scores
| Source | Rating |
| Alternative Press | 4/5 stars |
| Consequence of Sound | B |
| DIY | 4/5 stars |
| Exclaim! | 8/10 |
| Kerrang! | 4/5 stars |
| The Line of Best Fit | 8/10 |
| NME | 8/10 |
| Record Collector | 4/5 stars |
| The Skinny | 3/5 stars |
| Sputnikmusic | 4.5/5 |

PUP is the debut album by Canadian punk rock band PUP. While this is the first album under the PUP name, they released an album called Oceans under the name Topanga previously. This album has some tracks from the previous album. The album was recorded with the financial support of the Government of Canada through the Department of Canadian Heritage (Canada Music Fund) and Canada's Private Radio Broadcasters. PUP was released on October 8, 2013 through Royal Mountain Records in Canada and later re-released on April 8, 2014, through SideOneDummy Records.

== Track listing ==
All tracks are written by PUP.

| No. | Title | Length |
|---|---|---|
| 1. | "Guilt Trip" | 3:20 |
| 2. | "Reservoir" | 3:16 |
| 3. | "Mabu" | 2:08 |
| 4. | "Never Try" | 3:46 |
| 5. | "Yukon" | 5:26 |
| 6. | "Dark Days" | 3:26 |
| 7. | "Lionheart" | 2:41 |
| 8. | "Cul-de-Sac" | 3:22 |
| 9. | "Back Against the Wall" | 2:26 |
| 10. | "Factories" | 4:29 |

== Personnel ==
PUP

- Stefan Babcock – lead vocals, rhythm guitar
- Nestor Chumak – bass, backing vocals
- Zack Mykula – drums, backing vocals
- Steve Sladkowski – lead guitar, backing vocals

Others

- Dave Schiffman – recording, mixing
- Francis Belanger Lacas – recording assistant
- Spencer Sunshine – additional recording
- Howie Weinberg – mastering (at 'Howie Weinberg Mastering Studio', Los Angeles)
- Jason Bartell – cover art
