= Project Twinkle (album) =

Studio album by King Cobb Steelie
- Released: September 13, 1994
- Genre: Indie rock, jazz fusion
- Length: 59:09
- Label: Lunamoth
- Producer: Bill Laswell

King Cobb Steelie chronology
King Cobb Steelie (1993)	Project Twinkle (1994)	Junior Relaxer (1997)

Project Twinkle is the second album by Canadian alternative rock band King Cobb Steelie, released in 1994. Produced by Bill Laswell, the album moved away from the funk-rock of their 1993 album King Cobb Steelie toward a more groove-oriented sound.

The band contacted Laswell through mutual acquaintances, following an abortive recording session with Steve Albini.

== Reissue ==
The album was reissued in 2012 on Pheromone Recordings, with a new remix of "Italian Ufology Today" by Mad Professor as a bonus track.

The reissue was promoted with limited live performances at the Horseshoe Tavern in Toronto, and the Stay Out of the Mall Festival in the band's hometown of Guelph.

== Response ==
The album received positive reviews at the time of its release. Peter Howell of the Toronto Star wrote that "A great groove doesn't always require a vocal to go with it, and kudos to this Guelph funk-rock combo for realizing it. Not that the singing of guitarist/vocalist Kevan Byrne is likely to challenge any divas, anyway, but he makes his eccentric voice work for him, and only when the occasion demands - the instrumentals more than carry their own weight. A remarkably strong album," while Derek Weiler of the Waterloo Record wrote that "Project Twinkle sees Guelph's favorite sons continuing to grow in huge strides since their 1991 inception. The new album is sometimes problematic, but still reveals a powerful artistic vision and confirms King Cobb Steelie as the most vital and exciting combo to spring from the region. This time, the group has recruited the dub-friendly name producer Bill Laswell (following some aborted sessions with Steve Albini); Laswell has somehow simultaneously tightened the Steelie sound and enhanced their improvisatory feel. There are few jackhammer riffs like the ones that surfaced on the debut — instead, it's all bass- heavy grooves, subtle guitar fills, and complex layers of percussion."

For AllMusic, Sean Carruthers rated the album 4.5 stars, writing that "the album shows the band leaning less toward jagged punk stylings and more toward sinewy, atmospheric dub. Sometimes the vocals disappear completely while the band lays into a groove, but this is not altogether a bad thing. Although "Triple Oceanic Experience" was nearly a hit single, the album's centerpiece is the nine-and-a-half-minute "80% Knockout," which brings together all of the band's influences in a beautifully sparse package."

The album received a Juno Award nomination for Alternative Album of the Year at the Juno Awards of 1995.

Over time, however, the album developed a reputation for being one of the weaker ones in the band's catalogue, with even the band themselves sometimes characterizing it as a rush job. At the time of the 2012 reissue, however, Ben Rayner of the Toronto Star wrote that "The tide of the times has lately cycled hipsterdom back around to sounds that orbit in the vicinity of the nifty stuff these stylistically omnivorous Guelph groove-rockers and highfalutin' producer Bill Laswell got up to together on Twinkle, but King Cobb Steelie remains a one-of-a-kind deal. Even the bits of Project Twinkle that could be accused of dating a bit - the elongated, scritchy-scratchy funk-punk throwdowns "Triple Oceanic Experience" and "The Pollinator," for instance - arguably hold up better than similar-sounding stuff from the period by, say, the Red Hot Chili Peppers or I Mother Earth." Michael Barclay of the Guelph Mercury wrote that "Project Twinkle is obviously a transition album: they're audibly moving away from some of the grungy elements that defined their best rock songs, and into more exploratory territory....KCS were - and are - the rare rock band who could incorporate heavy funk grooves without coming off like the Red Hot Chili Peppers; indeed, nothing they ever tried - except maybe the occasional turntable scratch or awkward rapid-fire rap - sounded like genre tourism. This was - is - a group of musically ravenous men who translate all their influences into a unique language."

== Track listing ==
1. "Slump" (3:41)
2. "Triple Oceanic Experience" (4:10)
3. "Maynard" (4:04)
4. "Italian Ufology Today" (5:58)
5. "Gamblore/All Flights Go to Moscow" (5:39)
6. "The Pollinator" (5:09)
7. "80% Knockout" (9:25)
8. "Lunar Rotisserie" (8:10)
9. "Mano Ponderosa" (4:28)
10. "Technique" (8:20)
