= Stuff (Holly McNarland album) =

Studio album by Holly McNarland
- Released: June 24, 1997
- Recorded: 1997
- Studios: Armoury Studios, Vancouver, British Columbia, Canada; O'Henry Sound Studios, L.A., CA; The Plant, San Francisco, CA
- Genres: Rock, alternative rock
- Label: Universal Music
- Producer: Dale Penner

Holly McNarland chronology
Sour Pie (1996)	Stuff (1997)	Live Stuff (1999)

Stuff is the debut studio album by Canadian singer-songwriter Holly McNarland. It was first released in Canada on June 24, 1997, by Universal, then being released in the United States later that year. It includes the singles "Elmo", "Coward" and the hit single "Numb". During 1998, the album was certified Platinum in Canada, and is McNarland's best-selling album to date.

== Background and music ==
McNarland started to sing at the age of 3, and mainly grew up singing country music, since her mother listened to it. At the age of 17, she began playing guitar and writing music. Stuff was her first full-length release for Universal Music, which had also reissued her Sour Pie EP in 1996. The EP had previously been released independently in 1995, the same year that McNarland turned 20, and garnered a cult following. Universal were attracted to her singing ability, and McNarland chose them ahead of several other labels that were interested in her. Recording for the album began during early 1997, with the sessions taking place in Vancouver, Los Angeles and San Francisco. The Vancouver branch of Universal prioritized her as one of their main artists for the summer of 1997, and sent out the single "Numb" to radio stations in mid-June 1997, ahead of the album's release later that month. In a June 23, 1997 interview with Canadian publication RPM, McNarland said "there's a lot of freedom [at Universal]. There were four songs from the album that Universal hadn't heard until we were pretty much finished. And that's pretty much unheard of for a lot of people, for new artists especially."

"Numb" lyrically revolves around heroin addiction. In a 1997 interview with MuchMusic, from when the album was being recorded, McNarland said that most of her lyrics don't revolve sexual themes. She noted that she showed one of the songs she was working on to a friend of hers over the phone, and they commented that it had a "sexy" chorus, even though the song had nothing to do with sex. In this same interview, she also stated that comparisons between her and Canadian singer-songwriter Alanis Morissette were "stale". Morissette had experienced huge success in 1995 through her album Jagged Little Pill, with McNarland saying "there's a lot of female artists out there that are being targeted for that. And it's unfair. Because they've been working hard for a long time, and they're getting this whole comparison." In another interview from July 1997, McNarland said that she liked other female singer-songwriters such as Sarah McLachlan and Sinéad O'Connor, but wasn't a fan of Morissette's music.

In the June 23, 1997 interview with RPM, McNarland described some of the material she wrote for Stuff as being less moody and introspective than what she wrote as a teenager. She said, "I've been writing a little bit less seriously. I think it's a growth thing; you just write and you venture into the next stage." McNarland added in the interview that she didn't consider herself to be a very skilled guitar player, saying that she hadn't improved much from when she first started playing at 17. The album featured former Pixies guitarist Joey Santiago as one of the session musicians. He and the rest of McNarland's backup band would not return for her second and final release on Universal, 2002's Home Is Where My Feet Are.

As Stuff was being recorded, McNarland had medium length hair and bangs, although she cut her hair short around the time the album was released. Since McNarland also had a piercing and tattoos, she was described as having an "edgy" or "tough girl" image at the time of Stuff's release. When Universal sent out promos copies to American industry sources in the summer of 1997, they came without any images of McNarland. Derek Summers, a director of marketing at the U.S. branch of Universal, told Billboard in 1997 that they did this since "we wanted the record to be heard on its own without the hype of 'another angry, young female artist' type of thing."

== Artwork ==
The album cover featured McNarland photoshopped to appear as though she was inside the mouth of her Jack Russell Terrier Owen. The back of the album shows a photo of the back of the dog, where its anus can be seen. For the American release of the album, this photo was moved to the inside of the album, as to avoid any potential complaints. The dog later went on to appear in the video for the single "Elmo".

Stuff's cover was listed in Pitchfork's feature on "The Worst Record Covers of All Time".

== Release and commercial response ==
The album was released in the United States on October 7, 1997, nearly four months after its initial Canadian release. In 1997, it was also released in Australia and some European countries. Despite going platinum in Canada, the album saw less success in the larger United States market. In 1998, the U.S. branch of Universal merged with PolyGram, and McNarland was one of the artists who was let go as a result of the restructuring. However, she still remained signed to Universal in Canada.

== Reception ==
Professional ratings
Review scores
Source	Rating
AllMusic	2.5/5 stars

RPM gave the album a positive review on June 30, 1997. They compared her voice to Sarah McLachlan and wrote "on Stuff, McNarland shows herself to be a contemporary commercial commodity with huge cross-over possibilities, despite her penchant to give the attending world a hearty middle finger." In September 1997, Billboard called it a "bruising rock album displaying the shimmering, soaring voice of this remarkable 23 year old Canadian." In May 1998, Alex Steininger of U.S. website In Music We Trust had a positive take on the record, writing "she can be obnoxious, she can be lethal, but most of all, she is always entertaining. [Her] lyrics are personal, drenched in regret, anger, and optimism, but they are also written from a stand point where others can sit back and go, 'yeah, I know how that is!'." He added that "she never lets her own feelings overshadow those the listener forms from her music".

In his retrospective review for AllMusic, Alex Henderson wrote "with Alanis Morissette and Fiona Apple burning up the charts, the mid- to late 1990s were more than friendly to angst-ridden female rockers. One of the most compelling 'angry young woman' releases of 1997 was Holly McNarland's Stuff, which gives the impression that the Canadian singer/songwriter lives and breathes dysfunction."

== Track listing ==
All songs written by Holly McNarland unless otherwise noted.

1. "Numb" – 3:57
2. "Elmo" – 4:40
3. "Porno Mouth" (McNarland, Adam Drake) – 4:16
4. "Water" (McNarland, Mark Pullyblank) – 5:32
5. "Coward" – 4:41
6. "The Box" – 3:15
7. "U.F.O." – 4:39
8. "Mystery Song" – 5:05
9. "Just in Me" – 2:20
10. "Twisty Mirror" – 3:14
11. "I Won't Stay" – 4:06

*bonus track on some editions

== Personnel ==
- Holly McNarland – vocals, acoustic and electric guitar
- Joey Santiago, Jay Joyce – guitar
- Susie Katayama – cello
- Mark Pullyblank – bass
- Adam Drake – drums
- Gaëtan Schurrer – programming
