= The Dream Is Over =

Studio album by PUP
- Released: May 27, 2016
- Studios: Union Sound Co., Lincoln County Social Club, Ta2 Sound and Music in Toronto, Ontario
- Genres: Punk rock; indie rock; hardcore punk; post-hardcore; skate punk; emo; pop-punk
- Length: 30:31
- Labels: Royal Mountain; SideOneDummy
- Producer: Dave Schiffman

PUP chronology
PUP (2013)	The Dream Is Over (2016)	Morbid Stuff (2019)

The Dream Is Over is the second album by Canadian punk rock band PUP, released on May 27, 2016, through Royal Mountain Records in Canada and SideOneDummy Records internationally. Produced by Dave Schiffman, the album followed two years of extensive touring behind the band's self-titled debut, during which PUP played approximately 450 shows. The experience made the group a more confident unit, but also placed considerable physical and emotional strain on its members.

The Dream Is Over pairs energetic guitars and shouted and gang vocals with darker lyrics centered on life on the road, strained relationships and disillusionment with adulthood. The album's title originated after recording had been completed, when frontman Stefan Babcock was diagnosed with a cyst and hemorrhaging in his vocal cords and advised by a doctor to stop performing, telling him that "the dream is over".

The Dream Is Over was well received by critics, who praised its combination of aggression and melodic hooks. The album appeared on several publications' year-end lists, including The New York Times, and was shortlisted for the 2016 Polaris Music Prize. It became PUP's first album to appear on national record charts and was later included on Stereogum's list of the 100 best albums of the 2010s.

== Background ==
Following the release of their self-titled debut album in 2014, Canadian punk rock band PUP spent much of its next two years touring. The band had initially set a goal of performing 200 shows in a year, and ultimately played approximately 450 over a two-year period. Frontman Stefan Babcock later credited the schedule with making PUP a more confident band. He felt their debut had captured the group while it was still establishing its musical identity. By the time they began their second album, Babcock said the members had developed a clearer collective vision and become more proficient at playing together.

The touring schedule placed increasing strain on the band. Babcock described life on the road as alternating between extremes, with prolonged separation from friends and partners occasionally contrasting with the band's enthusiasm for performing. The members similarly found that living in close quarters could strain their friendships. He later viewed The Dream Is Over as reflecting the physical, emotional and financial toll of the preceding two years of touring. Much of the album's lyrical tension also draws on broader feelings of disillusionment in adulthood.

== Recording and production ==
PUP wrote The Dream Is Over during brief periods at home between tours. After returning from one extended run in late 2015, the band immediately resumed work in its rehearsal space before leaving for another seven-week tour only days later. Unlike their debut, which had been recorded in Montreal, the band elected to make The Dream Is Over in their home of Toronto. Babcock said recording locally allowed the members peace and provided a mental reprieve after spending much of the previous two years away. The compressed schedule nevertheless remained a limitation; Babcock later said the album had been "kind of rushed" because of the band's schedule and that they did not feel they had completely achieved what they intended.

The album was produced by Dave Schiffman, a veteran producer with credits including the Red Hot Chili Peppers and Vampire Weekend. Musically, the quartet sought to reproduce the heaviness and energy of their live performances. Babcock described the intended result as a "rowdy, noisy clusterfuck", emphasizing loud arrangements and gang vocals. It was intended to offset Babcock's darker lyrics, maintaining an energetic sound despite their underlying anger and unhappiness.

== Composition ==
"If This Tour Doesn't Kill You, I Will" developed directly from the tensions of touring. It originated with drummer Zack Mykula, who jokingly told Babcock in the band's van, "Stefan, if this tour doesn't kill you, I will." The process writing the song differed from the band's usual method in that the lyrics were written first rather than last. Although its lyrics note intense hostility, Babcock considered the song tongue-in-cheek. "DVP" depicts Babcock drunkenly spiraling through a failing relationship, confronting his own immaturity and bleak outlook while recklessly driving Toronto's Don Valley Parkway.

"Sleep in the Heat" was inspired by the death of Babcock's pet chameleon, Norman. The pet had injured its tongue while feeding; the resulting infection necessitated its amputation, after which she struggled to eat and drink and eventually died. Babcock subsequently wrote "Sleep in the Heat" about the experience, presenting the loss in lyrics that outwardly resembled a breakup song. During recording, Babcock's girlfriend joked to producer Dave Schiffman that he had finally written a love song, only for it to be about his chameleon.

== Title ==
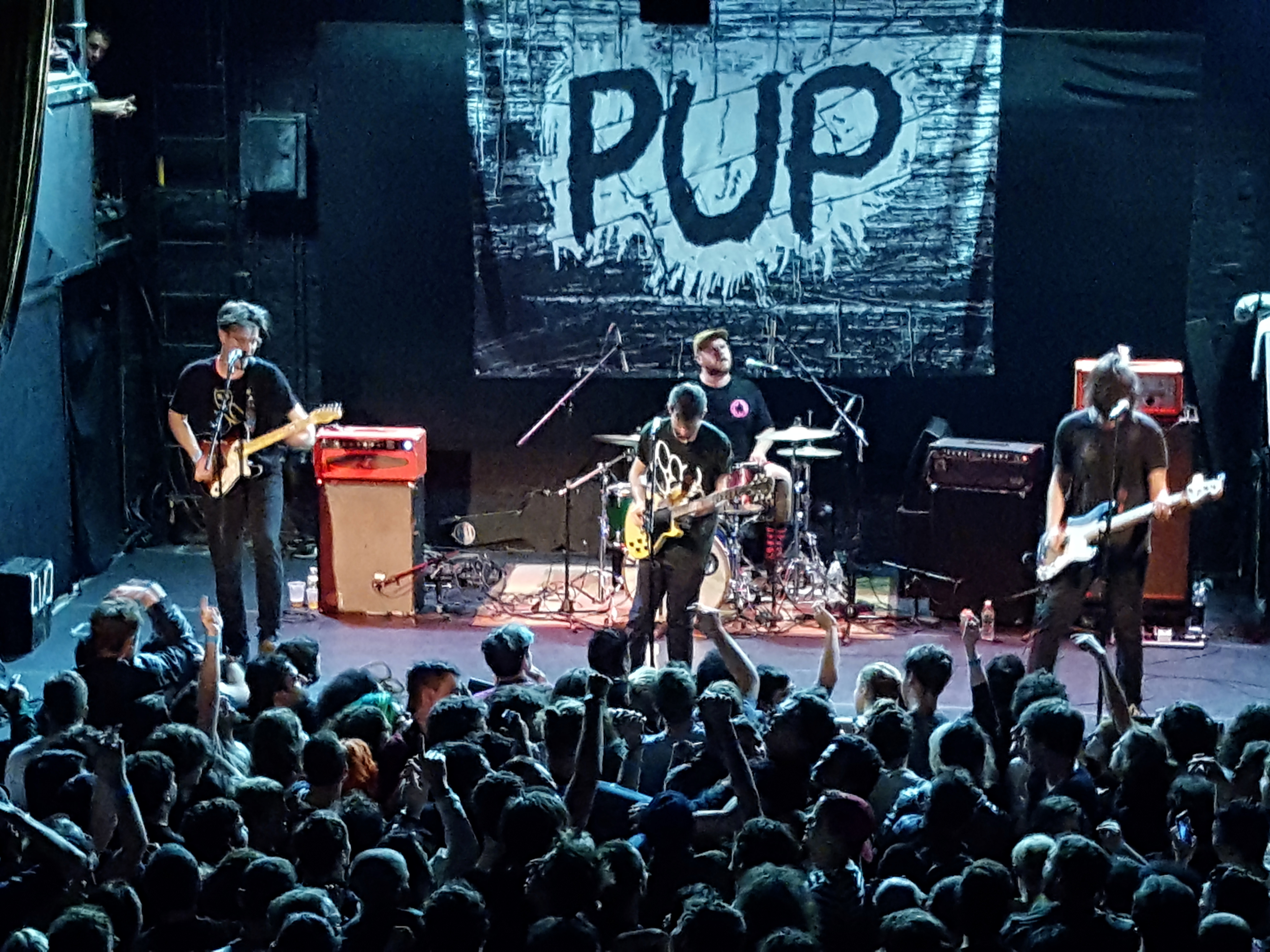
PUP performing at the Bowery Ballroom in New York City in October 2016.

The album was completed immediately before PUP returned to the road. Babcock recalled that the band finished recording and had only two days off before beginning a seven-week US tour with Modern Baseball. On the tour's first day, after noticing problems with his voice, he visited a specialist and learned that he had developed a cyst on his vocal cords, which had begun to hemorrhage. The doctor advised him to stop performing and told him "the dream is over". Babcock continued performing for six weeks, reasoning that if the injury was career-ending, he would rather continue until he was physically unable.

His vocal cords eventually hemorrhaged completely during a hometown performance. PUP continued for two shows by staging what they called "PUP Karaoke", in which fans and friends—including Jeff Rosenstock and members of Modern Baseball—performed the vocals, before the band cancelled the tour's final four dates. Babcock subsequently spent two weeks on prescribed vocal rest. A second doctor offered a less severe prognosis, advising that he could eventually resume singing with rest and vocal exercises. He later underwent physical therapy and vocal coaching and changed his touring habits to reduce the risk of reinjury. The bleak initial remark was subsequently adopted as the album's title; Babcock found it captured the album's tone and the gap between youthful expectations and adult life. The title also functions as a defiant joke at the expense of the original prognosis.

== Critical reception ==
Professional ratings
Aggregate scores
Source	Rating
AnyDecentMusic?	8.0/10
Metacritic	82/100
Review scores
Source	Rating
AllMusic	4/5 stars
The A.V. Club	B+
Consequence of Sound	B
DIY	4/5 stars
Exclaim!	8/10
Kerrang!	4/5
The Line of Best Fit	9/10
Pitchfork	7.8/10
Spectrum Culture	4.25/5 stars
Spin	7/10

Exclaim!'s Adam Feibel gave the album a positive review, calling it "youthfully sassy and sarcastic in one breath and introspectively mature in another".

=== Accolades ===
Publication	Accolade	Year	Rank
Stereogum	The 50 Best Albums of 2016	2016	22
Stereogum	The 100 Best Albums of the 2010s	2019	98
Noisey	The 100 Best Albums of 2016	2016	19
The New York Times	The Best Albums of 2016	2016	11

== Track listing ==
All tracks are written by PUP.

No.	Title	Length
1.	"If This Tour Doesn't Kill You, I Will"	2:18
2.	"DVP"	2:28
3.	"Doubts"	3:00
4.	"Sleep in the Heat"	3:21
5.	"The Coast"	3:53
6.	"Old Wounds"	2:19
7.	"My Life Is Over and I Couldn't Be Happier"	2:26
8.	"Can't Win"	3:07
9.	"Familiar Patterns"	3:39
10.	"Pine Point"	4:00

== Personnel ==
Credits adapted from the album's liner notes.

=== PUP ===
- Stefan Babcock – performance
- Nestor Chumak – performance
- Zack Mykula – performance
- Steve Sladkowski – performance

=== Additional contributors ===
- Dave Schiffman – production, recording, mixing
- Alex Gamble – engineering assistance
- John Dinsmore – engineering assistance
- Masumi Kaneko – engineering assistance
- Howie Weinberg – mastering
- Christopher McKenney – cover image
- Jessica Flynn – inside photo
- Graham Wright – piano on "If This Tour Doesn't Kill You, I Will"

== Charts ==
Chart (2016)	Peak position
Canadian Albums (Billboard)	48
Top Album Sales (Billboard)	82
US Independent Albums (Billboard)	12
US Top Alternative Albums (Billboard)	13
US Heatseekers Albums (Billboard)	1
US Top Rock Albums (Billboard)	20
US Vinyl Albums (Billboard)	5
