= Morbid Stuff =

Studio album by PUP
- Released: April 5, 2019
- Studios: Union Sound Co.; The Orange Lounge (Toronto, Ontario)
- Genres: Punk rock; pop-punk
- Length: 36:53
- Labels: Rise; Little Dipper
- Producer: Dave Schiffman

PUP chronology
The Dream Is Over (2016)	Morbid Stuff (2019)	This Place Sucks Ass (2020)

Singles from Morbid Stuff
- 1. "Kids" Released: January 15, 2019; 2. "Free at Last" Released: February 27, 2019; 3. "Sibling Rivalry" Released: June 26, 2019; 4. "See You at Your Funeral" Released: October 31, 2019

Morbid Stuff is the third album by Canadian punk rock band PUP, released April 5, 2019, through Rise Records and Little Dipper, the band's personal label.

== Background ==
Canadian punk rock band PUP released their second studio album, The Dream Is Over on May 27, 2016 via SideOneDummy Records. To support the album, the band went on a United Kingdom, Australia, and North American tour from August to December 2016, concluding with three shows at the Danforth Music Hall in their hometown of Toronto.

== Themes and composition ==
Morbid Stuff is largely focused on anxiety, depression, and death. In an interview with Now, vocalist and rhythm guitarist Stefan Babcock said that the central theme of Morbid Stuff was "accepting the darkness and the moods and all the bullshit that comes with it and just trying to find that little pinprick of light in it".

== Release and promotion ==
=== Singles and music videos ===
PUP announced the title and release date of Morbid Stuff in a zine mailed to fans in January 2019. The zine also included a 7" flexi disc of the lead single, "Kids". "Kids" was then released digitally on January 15, 2019, alongside a track listing for Morbid Stuff. An official music video for the track was released on January 30, 2019. Directed by Jeremy Schaulin-Rioux, the video is set in 2059 and follows a post-breakup PUP as they try to hunt down missing vocalist Stefan Babock, who has been found alive, "stinky and disheveled". Stereogum placed "Kids" at number 18 on its list of the "20 Best Music Videos of 2019", with reviewer Tom Breihan saying, "I can't even imagine how this got made, but I'm glad it did."

The second single and music video, "Free at Last", were released on February 27, 2019, and featured guest vocals from Eva Hendricks of Charly Bliss. Before officially releasing "Free at Last", PUP shared the chords and lyrics and asked fans to submit cover versions of the track; the music video was assembled from parts of the 253 submissions that the band received.

The last two pre-album songs, "Sibling Rivalry" and "Scorpion Hill", were released simultaneously on March 22, 2019. An animated music video for "Sibling Rivalry" was released on June 26, 2019, inspired by Babcock and his sister's annual "wild camping trips", in which the siblings were "constantly trying to out-dumb one another". The video, directed by Martin MacPherson, utilizes a combination of stop motion and traditional animation to illustrate said camping trips. The last music video for Morbid Stuff, "See You at Your Funeral", was directed by Joe Stakun and released on Halloween 2019. The video depicts an episode of the fictional television series Growing Up Ghouls, in which Jacko O'Ghoul's family tries to improve his mood.

=== Tour and live performances ===
PUP announced the first leg of their Morbid Stuff tour on January 15, 2019, as part of a larger album announcement. The tour ran in Europe and North America from March 26 to July 3, 2019, with support from Diet Cig, Ratboys, and Milk Teeth. On April 11, 2019, the band announced the "Morbid Stuff Tour-Pocalypse 2019", which ran from September through November and featured support from Charly Bliss and Illuminati Hotties. The Morbid Stuff touring cycle also included appearances at the Reading and Leeds Festivals on August 23 and 24, 2019.

== Reception ==
Professional ratings
Aggregate scores
Source	Rating
AnyDecentMusic?	8.1/10
Metacritic	85/100
Review scores
Source	Rating
AllMusic	4/5 stars
Consequence of Sound	B+
DIY	4/5 stars
Exclaim!	9/10
Kerrang!	4/5
NME	4/5 stars
Pitchfork	7.9/10
PopMatters	8/10
The Skinny	4/5 stars
Under the Radar	8.5/10

Morbid Stuff was met with "universal acclaim" from music critics according to Metacritic. At Metacritic, which assigns a normalized rating out of 100 to reviews from mainstream critics, Morbid Stuff has an average score of 85 based on 13 reviews. The review aggregator AnyDecentMusic? gave the album 8.1 out of 10, based on their assessment of the critical consensus.

Morbid Stuff was met with critical acclaim upon its release. Exclaim! called it "their strongest album to date" and Billboard called it a "must-hear punk album."

=== Accolades ===
Publication	Accolade	Rank	Ref.
The Alternative	Top 75 Albums of 2019	5	
The A.V. Club	Mid-year - Best Albums of 2019	N/A	
BrooklynVegan	Top 50 Albums of 2019	20	
Chorus.fm	Top 25 Albums of 2019	6	
Consequence of Sound	Top 50 Albums of 2019	14	
Consequence of Sound	Mid-year - Top 25 Albums of 2019 So Far	6	
Exclaim!	Mid-year - Top 29 Albums of 2019 So Far	3	
Exclaim!	Best Pop and Rock Albums of 2019	6	
Flood Magazine	Top 25 Albums of 2019	11	
Kerrang!	Top 50 Albums of 2019	22	
The Key	Top 15 Albums of 2019	13	
Kerrang!	Mid-year - Best Albums of 2019 So Far	N/A	
Loudwire	Best Rock Albums of 2019	N/A	
Magnet	Top 25 Albums of 2019	25	
The Needle Drop	Top 50 Albums of 2019	42	
NME	Top 50 Albums of 2019	26	
Noisey	Top 100 Albums of 2019	91	
Paste	Top 50 Albums of 2019	47	
Pitchfork	Best Rock Albums of 2019	N/A	
Stereogum	Top 50 Albums of 2019	31	
Stereogum	Mid-year - Top 50 Albums of 2019 So Far	23	
Sputnikmusic	Top 50 Albums of 2019	25	

== Track listing ==
All tracks are written by PUP.

No.	Title	Length
1.	"Morbid Stuff"	2:44
2.	"Kids"	3:30
3.	"Free at Last"	2:34
4.	"See You at Your Funeral"	3:40
5.	"Scorpion Hill"	5:08
6.	"Closure"	3:08
7.	"Bloody Mary, Kate and Ashley"	2:44
8.	"Sibling Rivalry"	3:27
9.	"Full Blown Meltdown"	2:32
10.	"Bare Hands"	3:35
11.	"City"	3:51
Total length:		36:53

== Personnel ==
PUP

- Stefan Babcock – lead vocals and rhythm guitar
- Zack Mykula – drums, backing vocals and percussion
- Steve Sladkowski – lead guitar and backing vocals
- Nestor Chumak – bass and backing vocals

Technical

- Dave Schiffman – production, recording, mixing
- Darren McGill – assistant engineering
- Spencer Sunshine – additional engineering
- Nick Rowe – additional engineering
- Harold Hess – mastering

Additional musicians

- Eva Hendricks – additional vocals on "Free at Last"
- Maïa Davies – additional vocals on "Scorpion Hill"
- Julia Loan – additional gang vocals

Artwork

- Nes Vuckovic – album artwork, layout
- Zack Mykula – additional layout work
- Amanda Fotes – inside photo

== Charts ==
Chart (2019)	Peak position
Canadian Albums (Billboard)	24
Scottish Albums (Official Charts)	26
UK Albums (Official Charts)	60
UK Independent Albums (Official Charts)	6
UK Rock & Metal Albums (Official Charts)	1
US Billboard 200	106
US Independent Albums (Billboard)	2
US Top Alternative Albums (Billboard)	7
US Top Rock Albums (Billboard)	14
