= More of Our Stupid Noise =

Compilation album by various artists
- Released: July 1996
- Label: Squirtgun

More of Our Stupid Noise is a Canadian compilation album, originally released in 1996 on Squirtgun Records. It was rereleased in 1998 on Nettwerk with the title More of Our Stupid Noise '98, with an altered track order and a few different songs.

One of the album's most noted characteristics was that in addition to a song by Eric's Trip, it also included a song by each individual Eric's Trip member's own side project.

A sequel album, Return of Our Stupid Noise, was released in 2015 to mark Squirtgun's 20th anniversary.

== Track listing ==
=== 1996 edition ===
1. Shortfall, "Drive"
2. hHead, "Want"
3. Scratching Post, "Full Throttle"
4. Treble Charger, "Bubble and Star (Here's Where the Guitars Come In)"
5. Radioblaster, "Comfy New You"
6. Versus, "Forest Fire"
7. Speedbuggy, "Bionica"
8. Poledo, "Herskin"
9. Lou Barlow, "Blown Pony"
10. Elevator to Hell, "Veins/Green"
11. Noah's Arkweld, "Xfriend"
12. Moon Socket, "Almost Spring"
13. The New Grand, "Yours Truly"
14. Orange Glass, "Feel 500"
15. Thee Suddens, "A Rhyme That No One Understands"
16. Purple Knight, "Fireball 500"
17. Hip Club Groove, "16 Jabs"
18. Eric's Trip, "So Easier Last Time"
19. Squirrel, "Superforgettor"
20. Julie Doiron (credited as Broken Girl), "So Fast"
21. Hayden, "A Fortune I'd Kept"
22. Len, "Making Our Dreams Come True" (a cover of the Laverne and Shirley theme song)

=== 1998 edition ===
1. Bionic, "C'mon C'Mon"
2. Shortfall, "Drive"
3. Scratching Post, "Full Throttle"
4. Radioblaster, "Perfect Burn"
5. The Ids, "Pain and Beauty"
6. Lou Barlow, "Blown Pony"
7. Mystery Machine, "What I Want"
8. Elevator to Hell, "Veins/Green"
9. Poledo, "Herskin"
10. hHead, "Want"
11. Speedbuggy, "Bionica"
12. By Divine Right, "Bigfoot"
13. Squirrel, "superforgettor"
14. Versus, "Forest Fire"
15. Julie Doiron, "So Fast"
16. Hayden, "A Fortune I'd Kept"
17. Moon Socket, "Almost Spring"
18. Hip Club Groove, "Guaranteed"
19. The Suddens, "A Rhyme That No One Understands"
20. Orange Glass, "Feel 500"
21. Eric's Trip, "So Easier Last Time"
22. Len, "Trillion Daze"
23. The Bonaduces, "You're So Lame When You're Drunk"
24. The New Grand, "Yours Truly"
25. Noah's Arkweld, "Xfriend"

=== Return of Our Stupid Noise (2015) ===
1. By Divine Right, "The Hill"
2. Dany Laj & the Looks, "Take It Away"
3. Moonsocket, "Hold Me Now"
4. Scratching Post, "Come Undone"
5. The Skeletones Four, "Bad Fortune Cookie"
6. Radioblaster, "Cabin Fever"
7. Bremen Town Players, "Out in the Wild"
8. Rag Maple, "Farewell My Wildwood Flower"
9. Public Animal,- "Stained Glass Heart"
10. Brendan Canning, "Born from the Ashes"
11. Little You, Little Me, "Violent Dreams"
12. Ryan Masters, "The Seed"
13. Devin & the Dark Light, "Bungalow"
14. Weird Lines, "Malibu"
15. Cam Bull, "A Little Piece of Me"
16. Carole Pope, "Viral '01"
17. Gordon Shawcross, "Leonard Cohen"
18. Justin McDonald, "Letter Home"
19. hHead, "Fempire"
20. José Contreras, "Labyrinthinium"
