= Wilson Street (Hamilton, Ontario) =

Road in Hamilton, Ontario, Canada

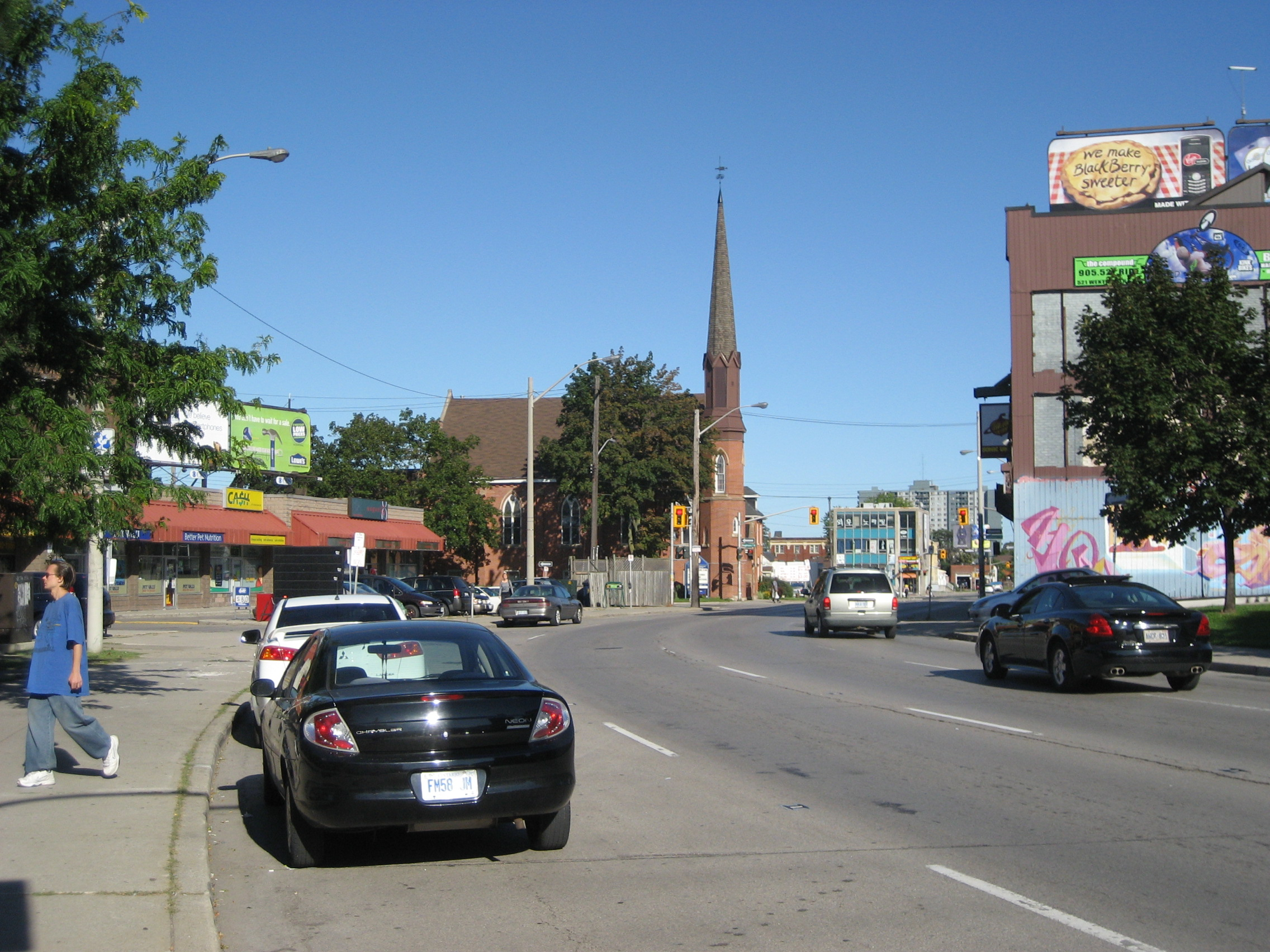
Wilson at James Street looking East

Wilson Street is a Lower City collector road in Hamilton, Ontario, Canada. It starts off at James Street North and works its way East and ends at Sherman Avenue North. The section between James Street and Ferguson Avenue was a one-way road, but was converted to a two-way street at 10 am on December 10, 2010.

== History ==
There are two streets in Hamilton, Ontario named Wilson Street, one in downtown Hamilton and the other in Ancaster. In 2001 when Amalgamation took place Ancaster joined up and became a part of the new Hamilton along with the towns of Dundas, Flamborough, Glanbrook and Stoney Creek. The name of the main road that cuts through Ancaster is also named Wilson Street. Originally, Wilson Street in downtown Hamilton was part an Indian Trail. Other city roads that were Indian Trails include, York Boulevard and King Street in the Lower City plus Concession Street and Mohawk Road on the Hamilton mountain.

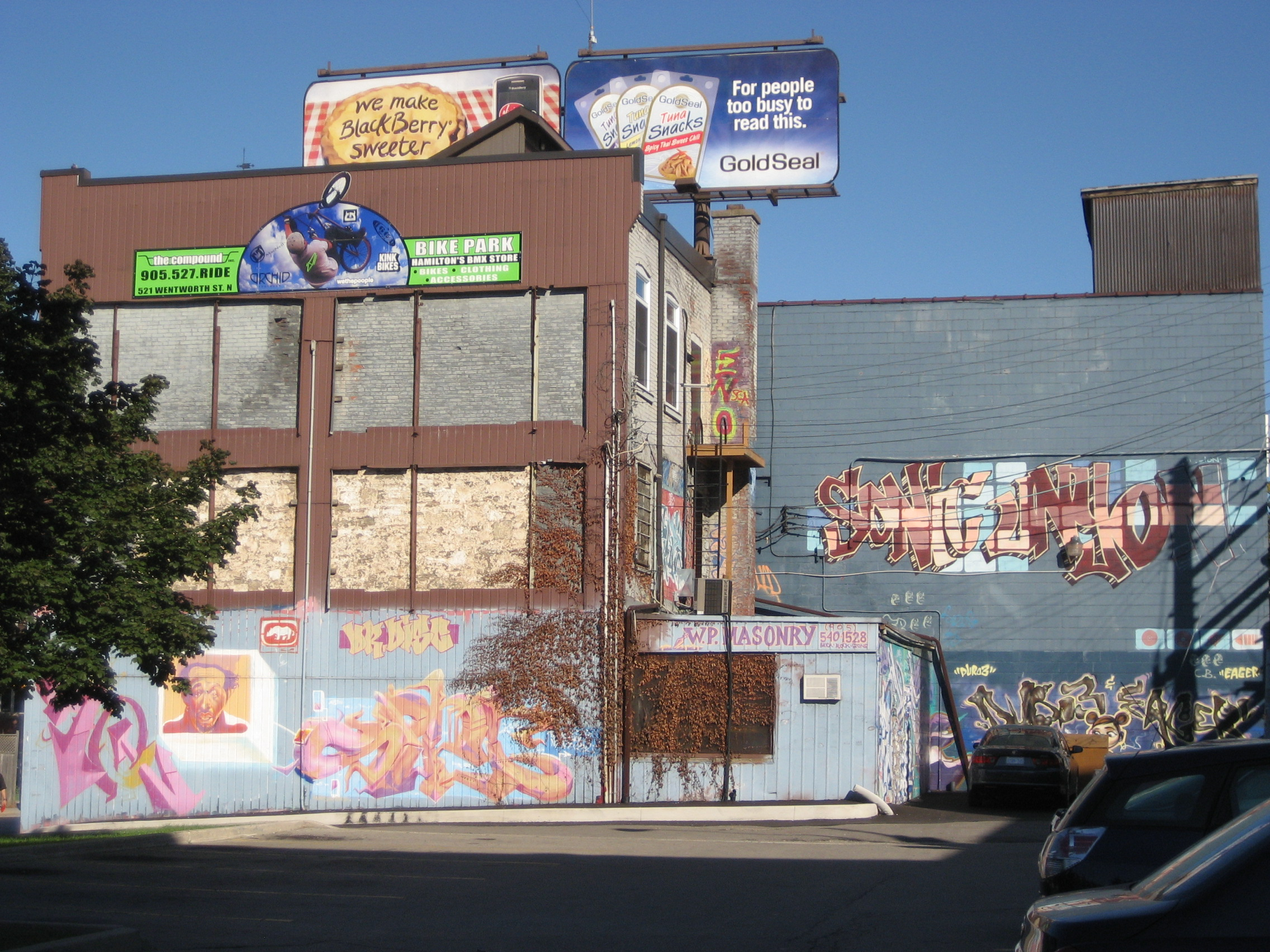
Sonic Unyon Records

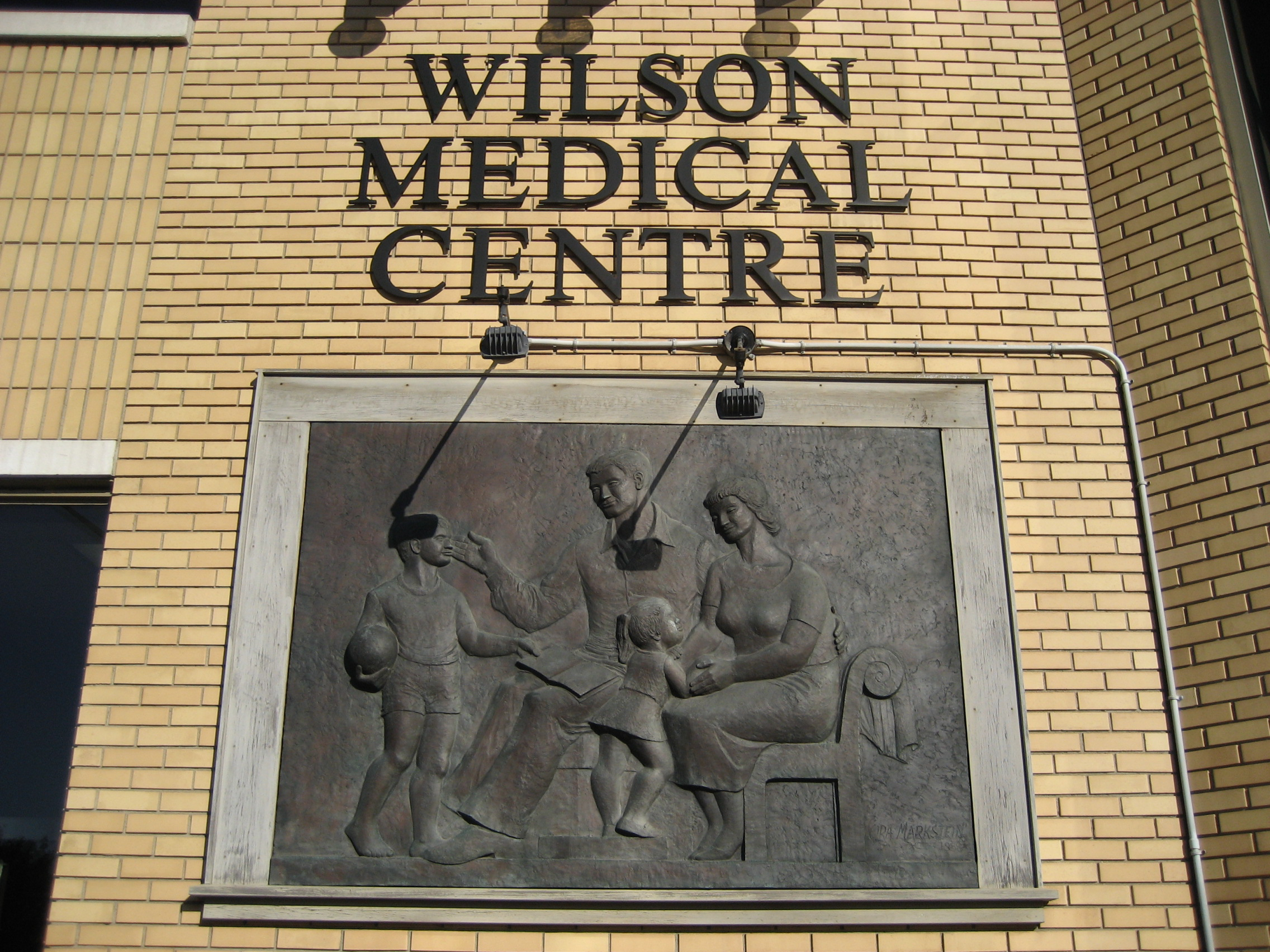
Wilson Medical Centre

Wilson Street in Hamilton between James Street and Mary Street was originally called Gore Street after the District of Gore. Wilson Street was named after Hugh B. Wilson, a local landowner who opened a survey on the street.

Sonic Unyon Recording Company, is a Hamilton, Ontario-based record label, (Wilson Street near James Street North), that has put out releases by bands including Tristan Psionic, Sianspheric, Shallow North Dakota, Eric's Trip, Hayden, the New Grand, Frank Black and the Catholics, A Northern Chorus and Raising the Fawn. Founded in 1992 by Mark Milne, Sandy McIntosh and Tim Potocic (of Tristan Psionic), Sonic Unyon is one of the largest independent labels in Canada.

== Time capsule ==
A Time capsule was buried beneath a marker on the north-east corner of James & Wilson Streets on Wednesday November 16, 1988 by the Jamesville Business Community under the aegis of the City's Business Improvement Area (B.I.A.) Programme. It commemorates the completion of the James Street North streetscape project (1986–1988) which marked the renaissance of this historic link between the Hamilton Harbour and the City Centre.

James Street has always been the focal point for new Canadians arriving in Hamilton, first by ship from overseas docking at the foot of James Street later by train at the CN Railway Station. The first arrivals were English, Scottish and Irish; later came Italian and German; more recently Portuguese and then Greek. All in their turn have added to the cultural richness of the street. The Capsule is to be opened on Tuesday, November 16, 2038 by the Mayor, Alderman and Business Leaders of James Street North on that day.

Those that were in attendance in 1988 when the time capsule was buried include Bob Morrow (Mayor), Sidney H. Leon (President of the Jamesville B.I.A.), Jerry Sherman (Vice President of Jamesville B.I.A.), Vince Agro (Alderman Ward 2), Filipe M. Vianna (Treasurer) and William M. McCulloch (Alderman Ward 2).

== Landmarks ==
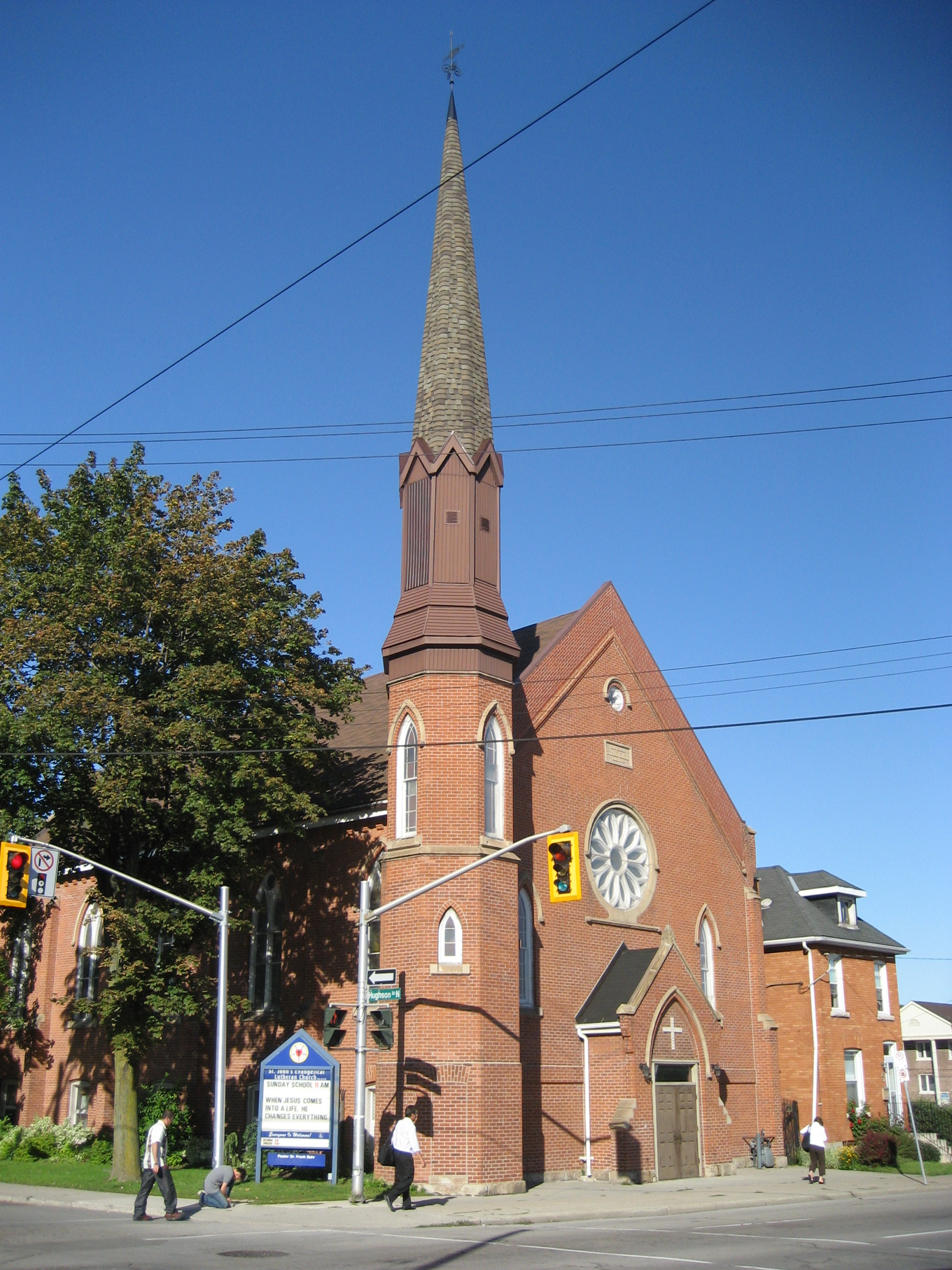
St. John's Evangelical Lutheran Church

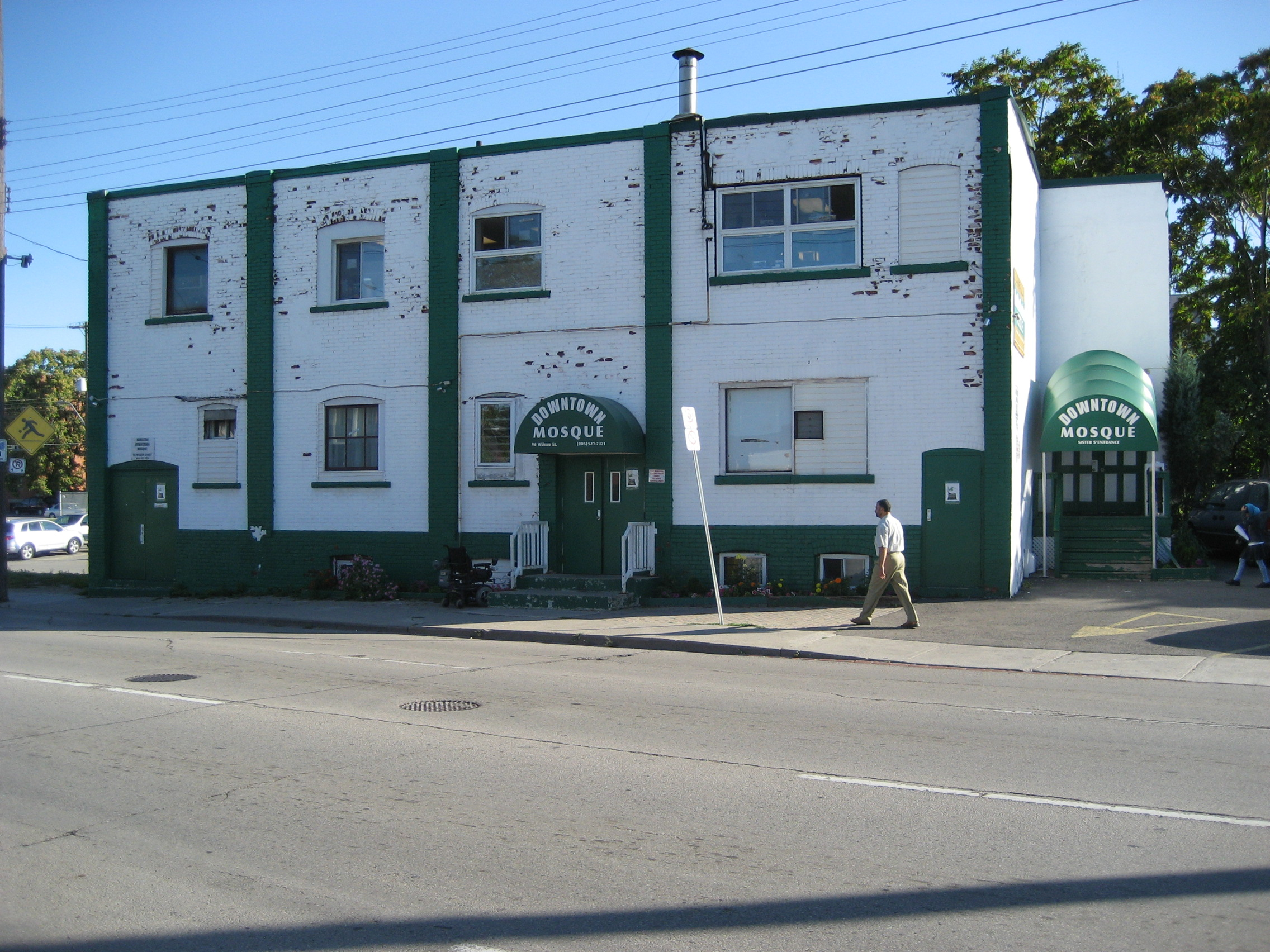
Hamilton Downtown Mosque

Note: Listing of Landmarks from West to East.

- Hamilton City Centre (Mall, formerly the Eaton's Centre), this point marks the end of York Boulevard and the same road then becomes Wilson Street
- Jamesville, which is shared by the Italian & Portuguese communities of Hamilton
- James North Art District
- Time capsule, north-east corner of James & Wilson Streets (Nov-16-1988, Nov-16-2038)
- Sonic Unyon Recording Company
- Living Rock Ministries building
- Stewart Memorial Church (originally St. Paul's African Methodist Episcopal Church. 1961 also became a Masonic Hall. North of Wilson on John Street.)
- St. John's Evangelical Lutheran Church
- Hamilton Downtown Mosque
- Beasley Park
  - Beasley Park water fountain
  - Beasley Park Community Centre
- Wilson Medical Centre/ Pharmacy
- Wilson Diagnostic Centre
- Dr. J. Edgar Davey Elementary School
- Wellington Place Apartments, 18-storey building
- Jack C. Beemer Park
- Eagle Worldwide Revival Centre, (church)
- Cathedral Secondary School
- Parks Furniture Warehouse building

== Communities ==
Note: Listing of neighbourhoods from West to East.

- Central – The financial center of Hamilton, Ontario
- Beasley
- Landsdale
- Gibson
- Stipeley

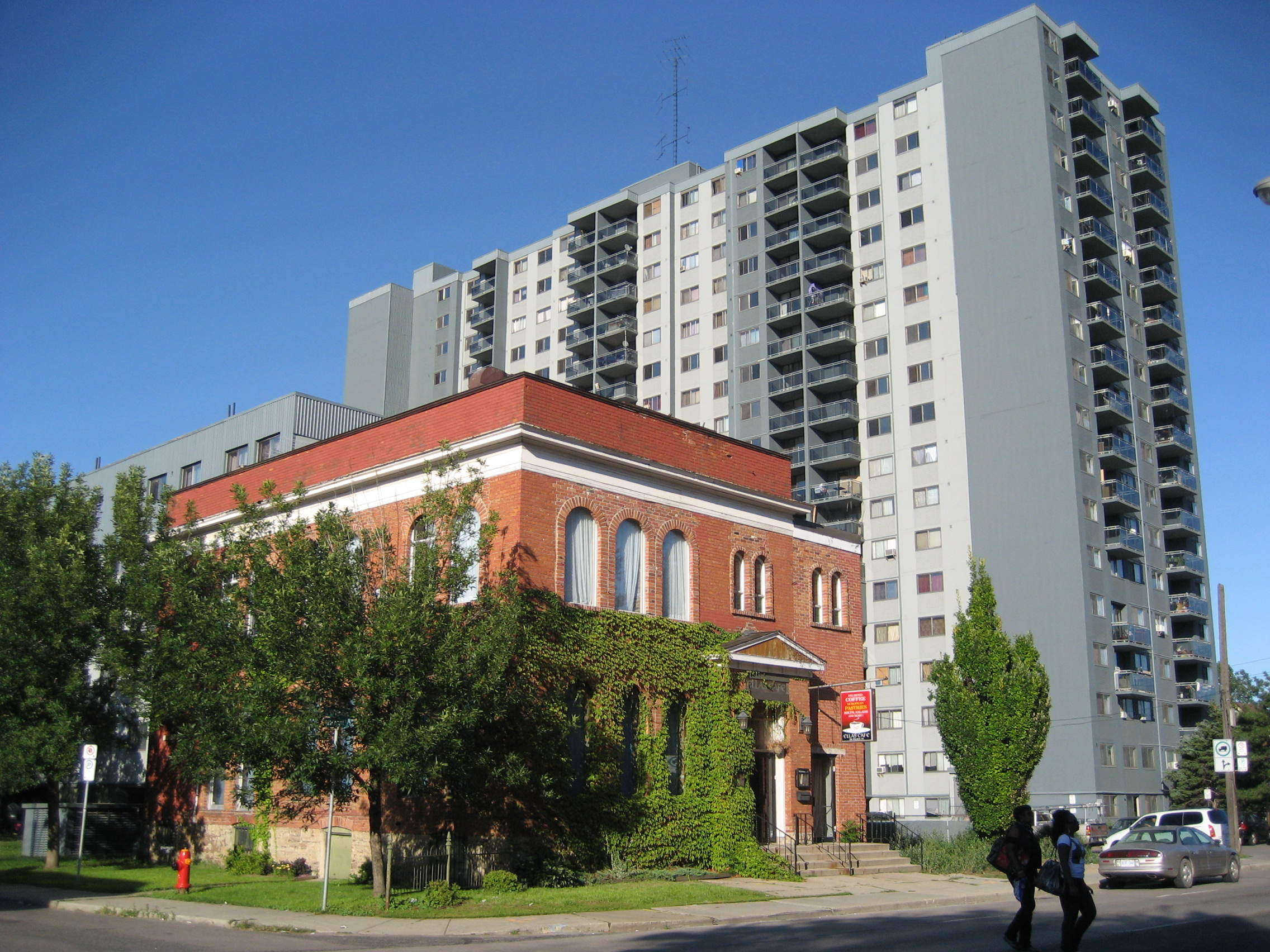
Wellington Place Apartments

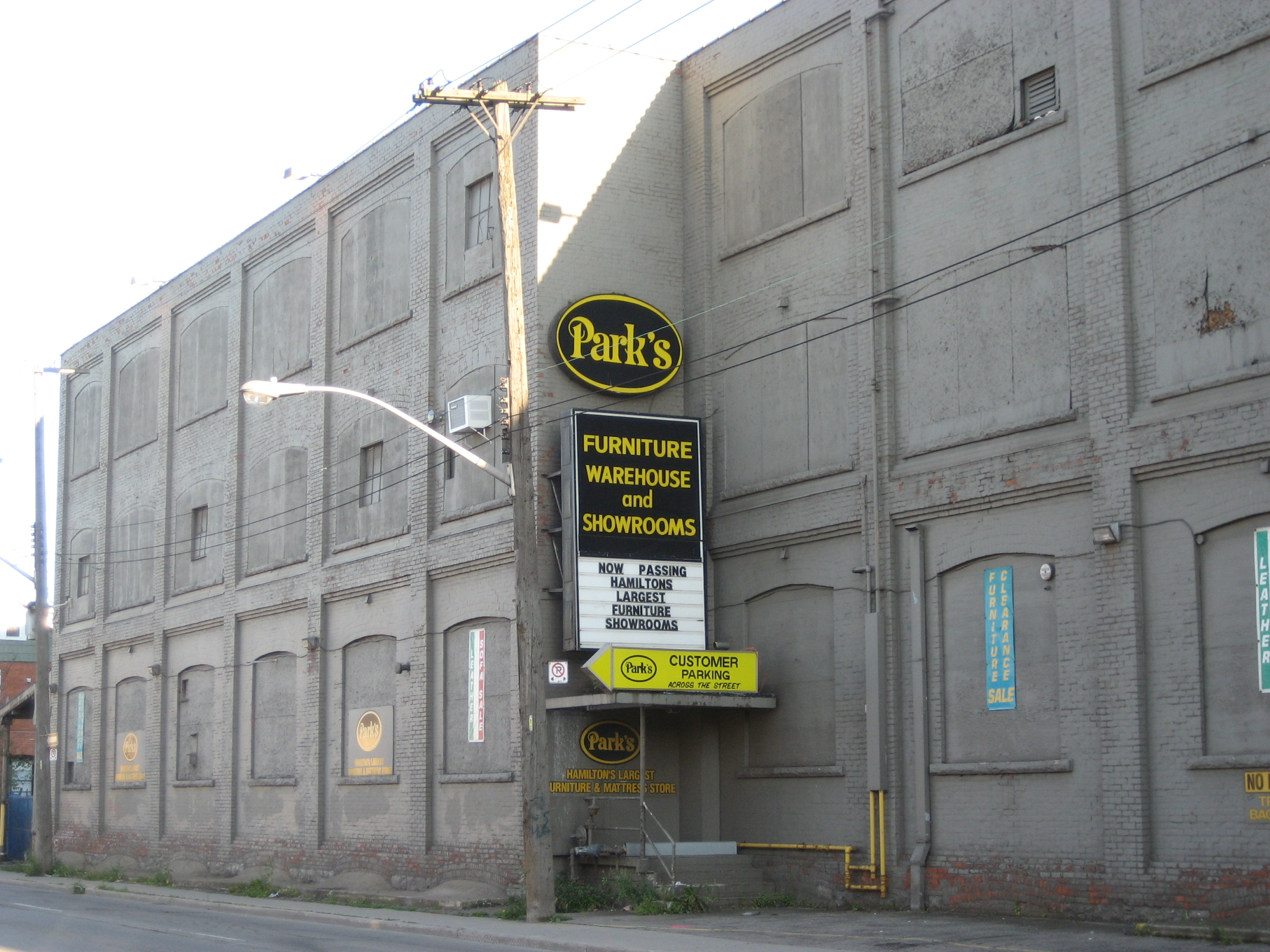
Parks Furniture Warehouse building

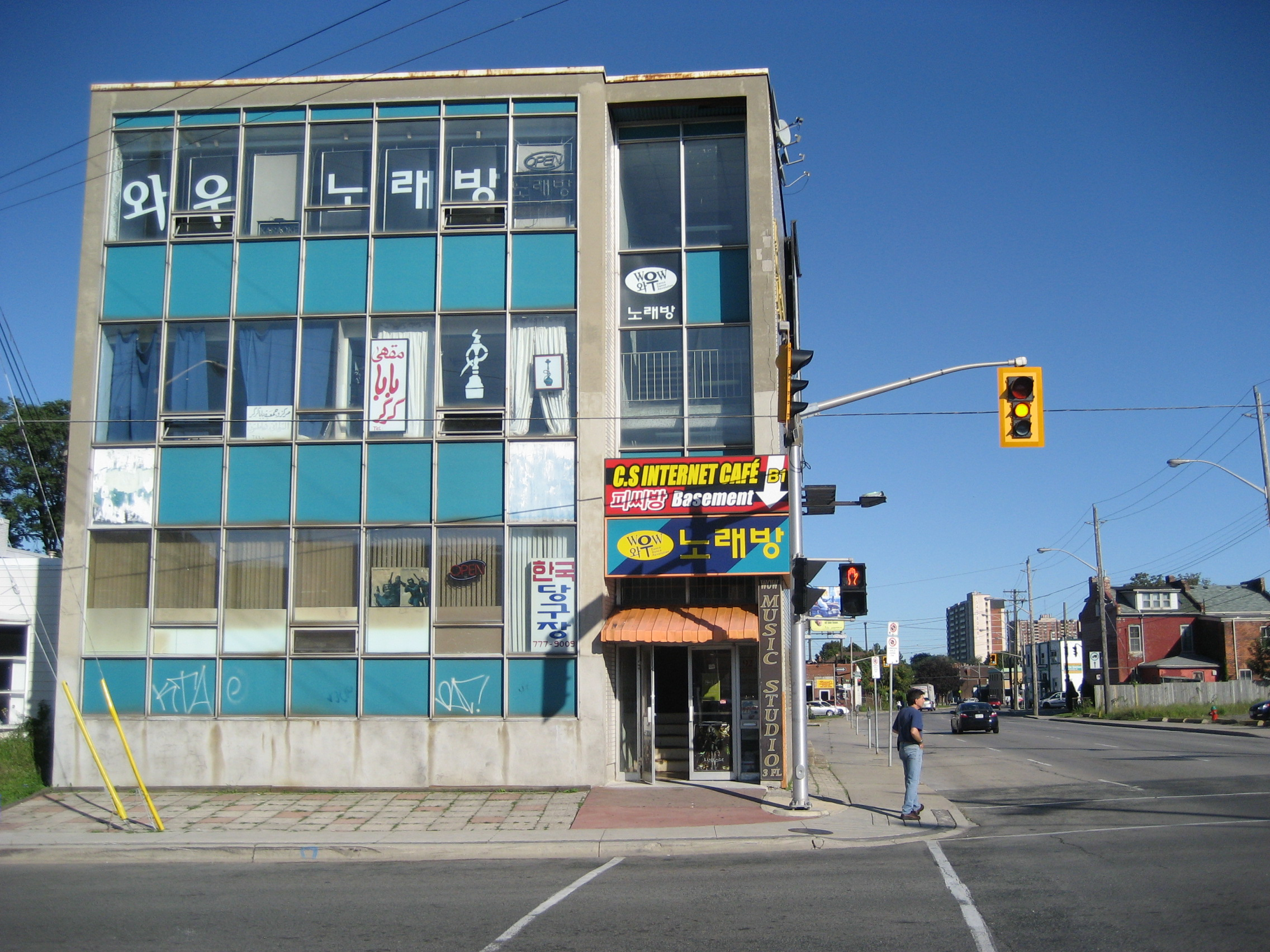
Wilson Street at Catharine

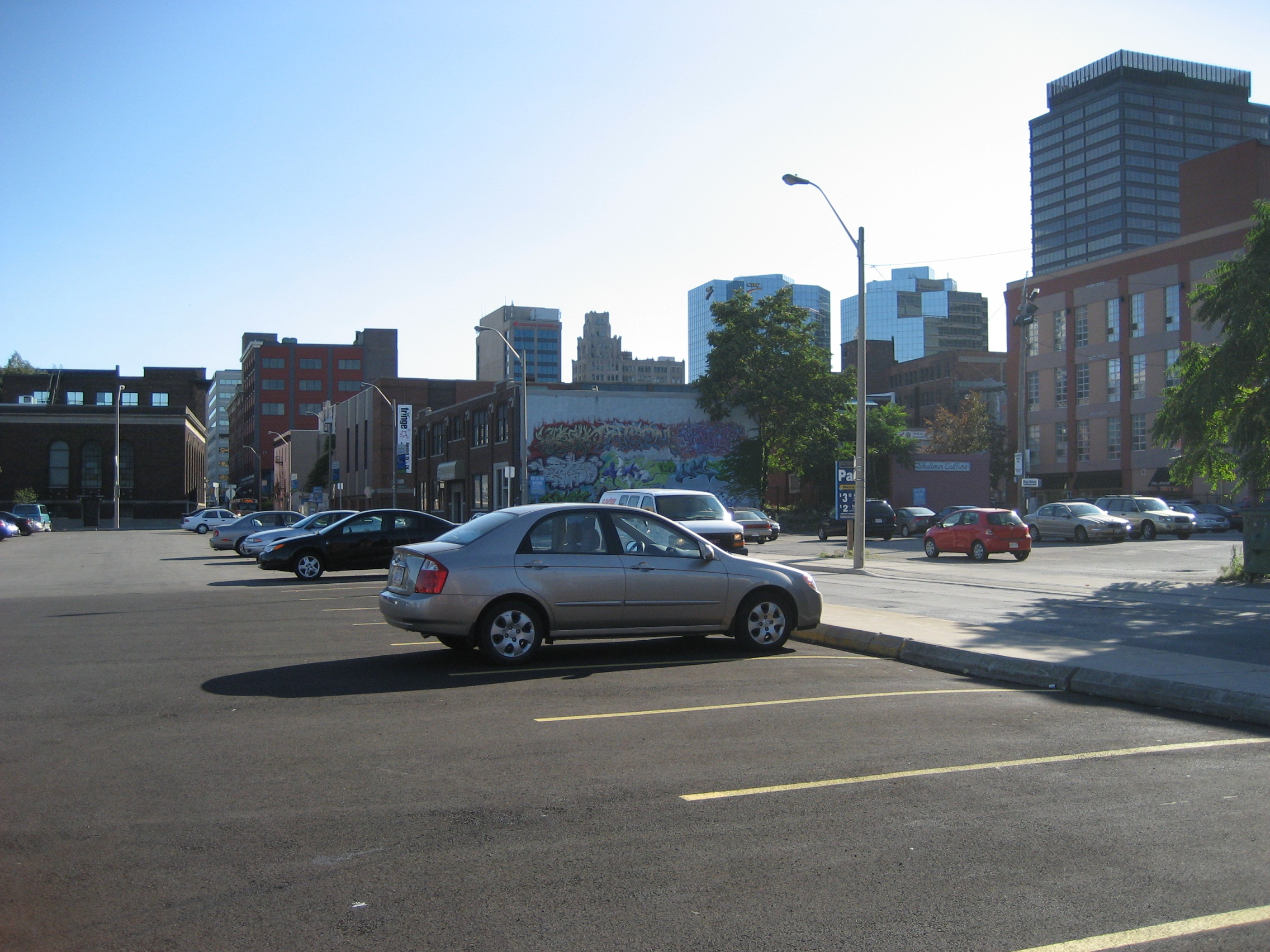
One of many parking lots found along Wilson Street

== Images ==
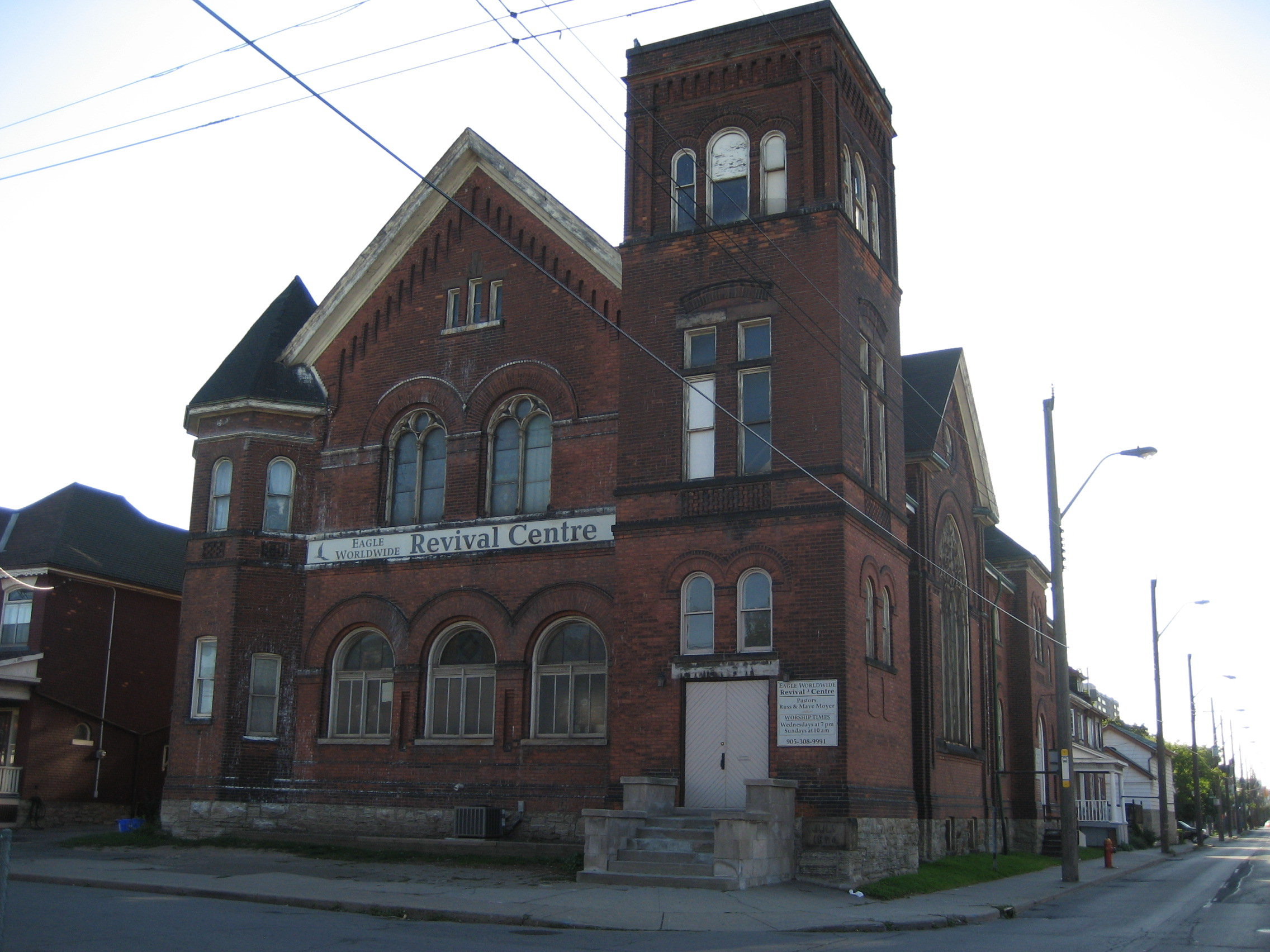
Eagle Worldwide Revival Centre

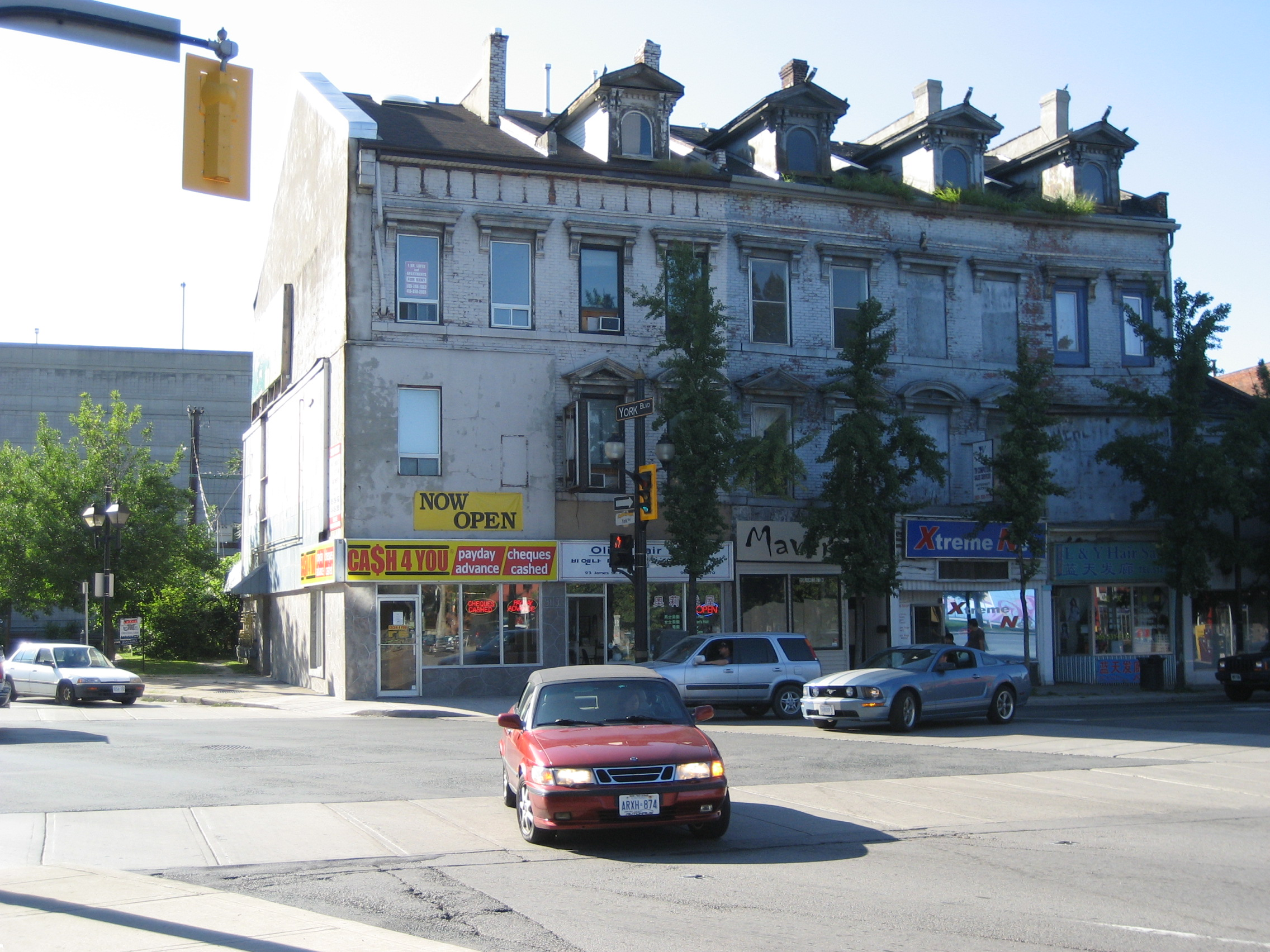
Wilson Street at James

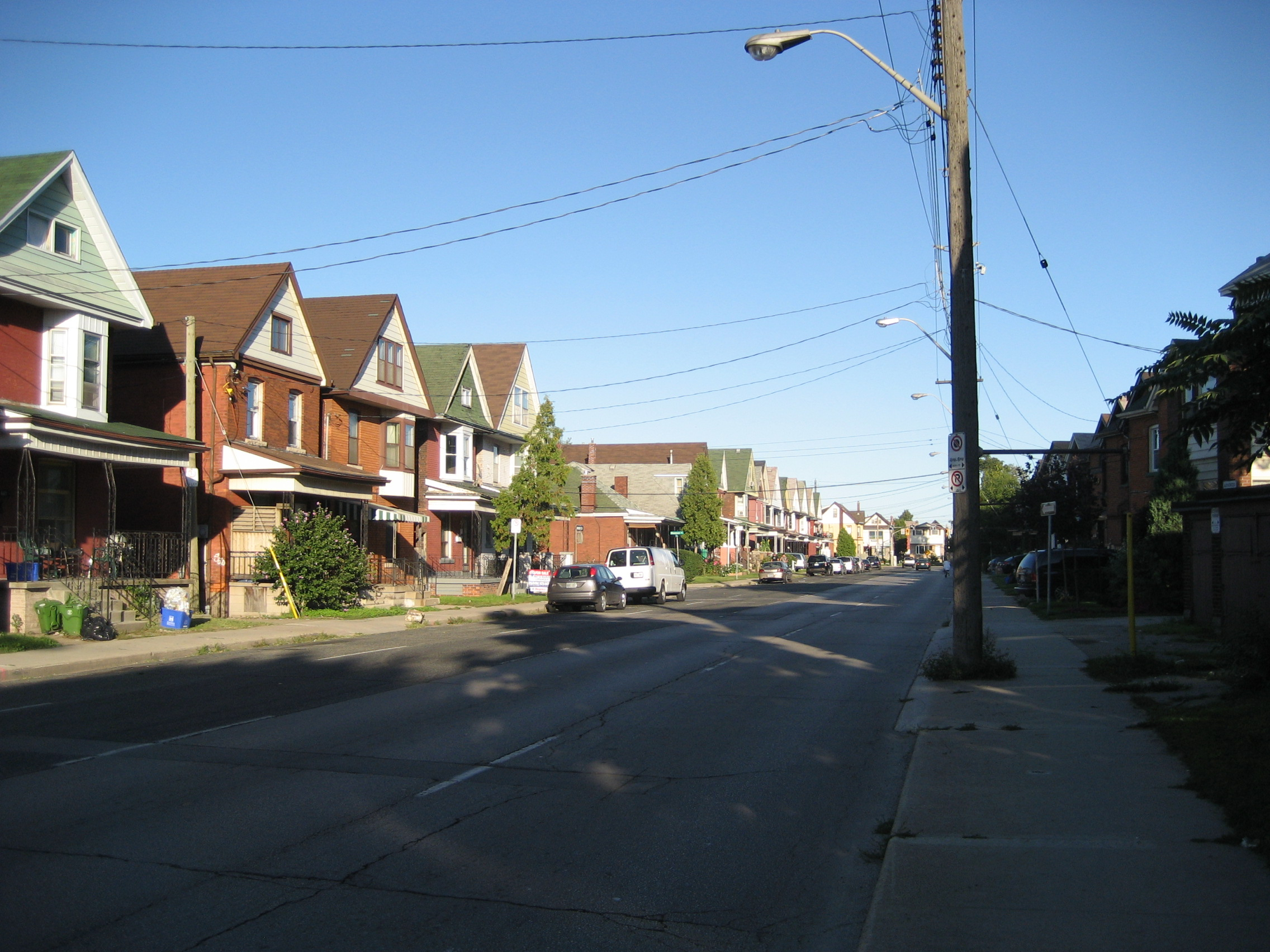
Wilson Street looking East

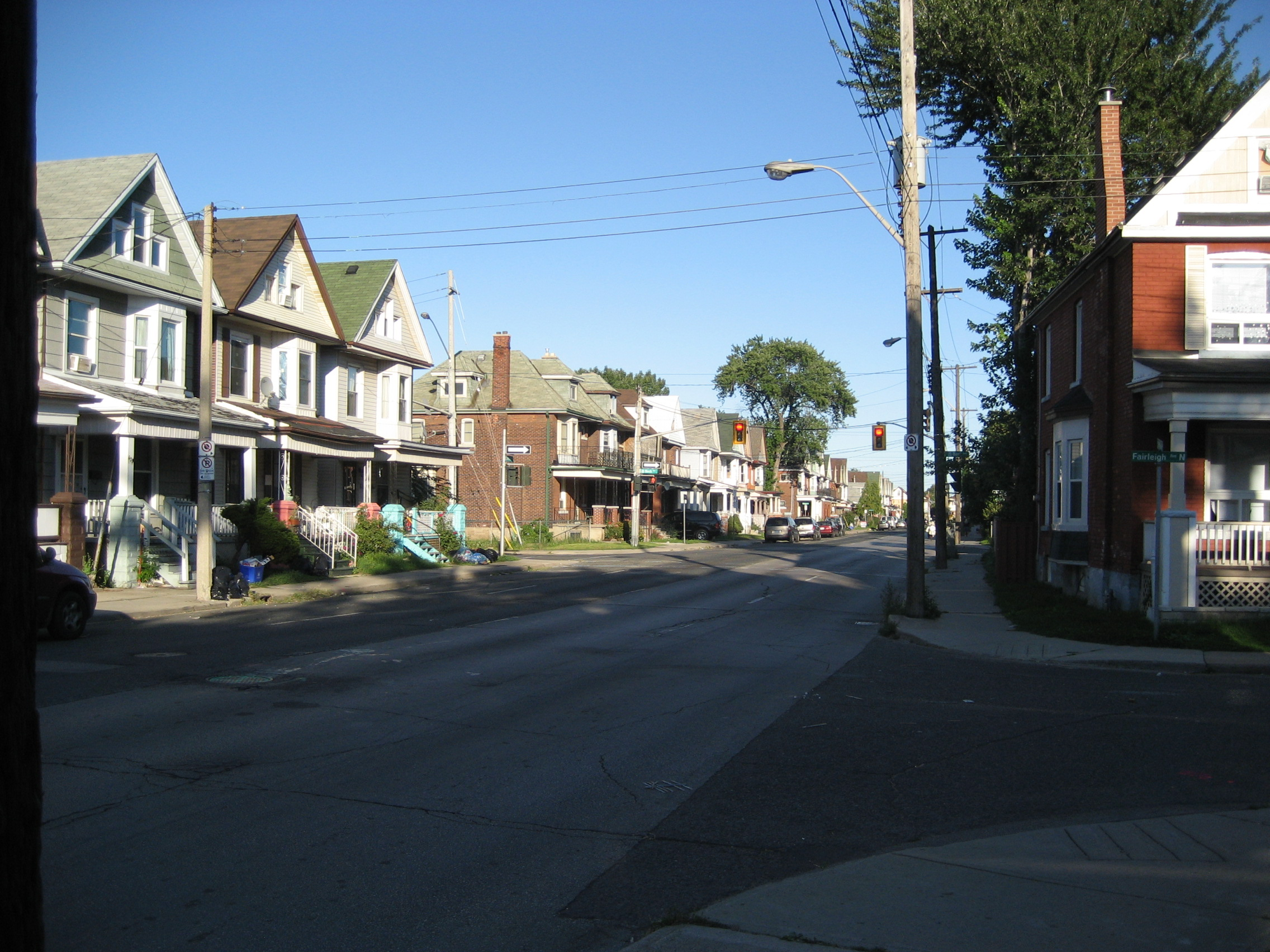
Wilson Street looking East
