= Love Tara =

Studio album by Eric's Trip
- Released: November 9, 1993
- Recorded: April – June, 1993; July 6–7, 1993 (Remixing)
- Studio: Stereo Mountain, Moncton, New Brunswick
- Genre: Indie rock, lo-fi, grunge
- Length: 37:00
- Label: Sub Pop
- Producer: Eric's Trip, Bob Weston

Eric's Trip chronology
Julie and the Porthole to Dimentia (1993)	Love Tara (1993)	Warm Girl 7" (1993)

Love Tara is the debut studio album by Canadian indie rock band Eric's Trip.

It was their first release on Seattle's Sub Pop record label and their second not independently released, as well as the first album by a Canadian act to be released by Sub Pop. The album was self-recorded in three months and reflected Sub Pop's shift toward lighter, more melodic music from the grunge on which it initially built its reputation. Though the lo-fi quality of the record threw many listeners and critics off, it was still very well received in both Canada and the United States.

Two music videos were shot for songs on the album; "Stove", shot by Peter Holt in Halifax, and "My Room", shot by White, in Moncton. Both music videos were shot on Super8mm film.

== Critical reception ==
Professional ratings
Review scores
Source	Rating
AllMusic	3.5/5 stars
Entertainment Weekly	B+

Mike Bell of the Calgary Herald praised the album as "Simplistic, charming, front-porch folk-pop with melodies that stick like a gradeschool tongue to a flag pole or rock riffs that sound like a dysfunctional Partridge Family jamming in the garage."

In Chart's Top 50 Canadian Albums of All Time polls, Love Tara ranked 35th in 1996, and 37th in 2000. It was also ranked 39th in Bob Mersereau's 2007 book The Top 100 Canadian Albums. In a 2015 review, Vice's Matt Williams dubbed it "one of the best Canadian albums ever", seeing it stay "a high watermark" within the nation's music history. Both Williams and Exclaim!'s Vish Khanna also heralded it as a key work of Canada's 1990s East coast scene.

At the 2017 Polaris Music Prize awards ceremony, the album won the jury vote for the Heritage Prize in the 1986–1995 category.

== Influence on other musicians ==
Fellow Canadian rock band Sloan covered the song "Stove" in the 1993 compilation album DGC Rarities Volume 1, which combined "Stove" into a medley with "Smother", a non-album track that Eric's Trip recorded for the Never Mind the Molluscs compilation.

The title of the album was referenced in the Tragically Hip song "Put It Off," from their 1996 album Trouble at the Henhouse: "I played Love Tara/by Eric's Trip/on the day that you were born".

== Track listing ==
No.	Title	Length
1.	"Behind the Garage"	3:13
2.	"Anytime You Want"	1:19
3.	"Stove"	2:54
4.	"Follow"	2:37
5.	"Secret for Julie"	2:50
6.	"Belly"	3:18
7.	"Sunlight"	3:22
8.	"June"	1:14
9.	"To Know Them"	1:07
10.	"Spring"	3:00
11.	"Frame"	2:10
12.	"May 11"	1:18
13.	"My Room"	2:40
14.	"Blinded"	3:56
15.	"Allergic to Love"	2:02
Total length:		37:00

== Personnel ==
Eric's Trip

- Julie Doiron - vocals, guitar, bass
- Mark Gaudet - drums
- Chris Thompson - guitar, bass, vocals
- Rick White - guitar, vocals, drums

Production

- Produced by Bob Weston and Eric's Trip
