= Noyes Records =

- Founded: May 2005
- Founder: Chad Peck
- Status: Active
- Distributor: Sonic Unyon
- Country of origin: Canada
- Location: Truro, Nova Scotia
- Official website: noyesrecords.com

Noyes Records (pronounced 'noise') is an independent record label based in Truro, Nova Scotia, Canada. The music label was established in May 2005 by Chad Peck. Since 2005, the label represents mostly upcoming bands on the East Coast of Canada. In 2008, the label won the Coast's Best of Music Award for Best Local Label. Noyes bands have played notable national and international festivals including the Halifax Pop Explosion, Evolve Festival, and NXNE. Noyes artists are distributed nationally though Sonic Unyon, and are available on Zunior.com.

Some of the artists currently represented on the label include Tomcat Combat, VKNGS and The Got To Get Got (featuring ex-members of North of America), The Memories Attack (featuring former Eric's Trip guitarist Chris Thompson), A History Of (with former members of The Plan), and other East Coast bands.

== Additional sources ==
- Cooke, Stephen (July 24, 2008). "Soundmarket has Noyes answer". The Chronicle Herald. The Halifax Herald Limited.
- Students in Business (2005). "Students in Business - A Colchester County Success Story". Students in Business. Truro Chamber of Commerce. Archived from the original on August 20, 2008.
- Lindsay, Cam (June 7, 2007). "VKNGS: "Dave's of Thunder"". Exclaim.
