= Forever Again =

Studio album by Eric's Trip
- Released: September 26, 1994
- Recorded: May 11–29, 1994
- Genre: Indie rock, grunge, lofi
- Length: 41:32
- Label: Sub Pop
- Producer: Eric's Trip, Bob Weston

Eric's Trip chronology
| The Gordon Street Haunting EP (1993) | Forever Again (1994) | The Road South 7-inch (1995) |

Professional ratings
Review scores
| Source | Rating |
|---|---|
| AllMusic | 4.5/5 stars |
| The Encyclopedia of Popular Music | 4/5 stars |

Forever Again is the second studio album by the Canadian indie band Eric's Trip. The album was recorded and mixed by the band's guitarist, Rick White. Sessions for the album took place at band members' homes and at White's home studio, Stereo Mountain. It was released by Seattle's Sub Pop records as SP 268, in LP, CD and cassette formats.

The album documents the romantic parting of White and Julie Doiron, as well as White's issues with drug use.

The first few hundred copies of the vinyl LP ordered by mail-order included a bonus 7-inch EP with a comic book sleeve titled Notes From Stereo Mountain. The EP is one of the rarest items in the Eric's Trip catalog.

A Music video was shot for the song "View Master", by Laura Borealis and Rick White, on August 13, 1994 in and around Moncton, New Brunswick, on 16mm film. Another music video was shot on Super8mm film by Peter Holt, for the song "Girlfriend", in Lewisville, New Brunswick. Tara Landry and Ron Bates appear within the music video.

== Critical reception ==
Trouser Press called the album better than the debut, writing that "the songwriting tightens some of the eighteen selections into shapely forms, most noticeably when acoustic lightness is the chosen timbre."

== Awards ==
The album was a Juno Award nominee for Best Alternative Album at the Juno Awards of 1995.

== Track listing ==
1. "New Love" – 2:59
2. "This Way Out" – 1:08
3. "About You" – 1:22
4. "Girlfriend" – 2:19
5. "Always There" – 1:53
6. "Stupidest Thing" – 1:52
7. "December '93" – 2:08
8. "Thoroughly" – 1:14
9. "My Bed Is Red" – 4:47
10. "View Master" – 2:46
11. "Cloudy" – 1:40
12. "My Chest Is Empty" – 3:07
13. "Run Away" – 1:42
14. "Waiting All Day" – 2:51
15. "Let Go" – 1:45
16. "Hate Song" – 1:33
17. "Feeling Around" – 2:36
18. "Forever Again" – 3:51

== Personnel ==
- Julie Doiron - bass, vocals
- Mark Gaudet - drums, vocals on "Let's Go"
- Chris Thompson - guitars, vocals on "Run Away" and "Stupidest Thing"
- Rick White - guitar, vocals
