= The Darkest Spark =

Studio album by The Ghost Is Dancing
- Released: June 19, 2007
- Recorded: The Gas Station, Toronto Island
- Genre: Indie pop
- Label: Sonic Unyon

The Ghost Is Dancing chronology
The Ghost Is Dancing (2006)	The Darkest Spark (2007)

Professional ratings
Review scores
Source	Rating
AllMusic	3.5/5 stars
PopMatters	6/10 stars

The Darkest Spark is the debut full-length album by Canadian indie pop band The Ghost Is Dancing. It was released by Sonic Unyon Records on June 19, 2007.

== Track listing ==
All songs written by The Ghost Is Dancing

1. "September '01"
2. "The Darkest Spark"
3. "We'll Make It"
4. "Shuttles and Planes"
5. "Organ"
6. "Greatlakescape"
7. "Wall of Snow"
8. "The Dark and the Bright"
9. "Wait Another Day"
10. "Arrivals (Are Never Enough)"
