= The Ghost Is Dancing (EP) =

EP by The Ghost Is Dancing
- Released: September 19, 2006
- Genre: Indie pop
- Length: 22:44
- Label: Sonic Unyon
- Producer: Skylight Studios; Fourteenth Floor

The Ghost Is Dancing chronology
The Ghost Is Dancing (2006)	The Darkest Spark (2007)

The Ghost Is Dancing is an EP by The Ghost Is Dancing. The first song on the album, "To French Ave." is to commemorate their residence at Two French Avenue, in Toronto, Ontario. The EP was released on Sonic Unyon Records on September 19, 2006.

== Reception ==
The EP was generally well received. In a review of the EP, Chart magazine praised the "wistful, slightly nonsensical monosyllabic lyrics, sweetly feminine back-up vocals, and a bevy of instruments not usually found in the average four-piece" but found the overall effect "middling". Now magazine wrote that the stand-out track is "To French Ave.", which "oscillates gorgeously between muted, languid rhythms and beckoning climactic urgency."

== Track listing ==
All songs were written by The Ghost Is Dancing.

1. "To French Ave." – 3:43
2. "People" – 3:43
3. "The City Waltz" – 5:38
4. "The Running Song" – 3:33
5. "Organ" – 6:07
