= Purple Blue =

Studio album by Eric's Trip
- Released: January 16, 1996
- Recorded: August 1995, September 7–15, 1995
- Studio: CMS Studios, Moncton, New Brunswick
- Genre: Indie rock, grunge
- Length: 45:12
- Label: Sub Pop
- Producer: Eric's Trip; Bob Weston

Eric's Trip chronology
The Road South 7" (1995)	Purple Blue (1996)	Long Days Ride 'Till Tomorrow (1996)

Professional ratings
Review scores
Source	Rating
AllMusic	4/5 stars

Purple Blue is the third and final studio recorded album by the Canadian indie band Eric's Trip. The album marked a turn to a heavier, more psychedelic sound, which Rick White would further explore with Elevator.

A music video for "Sun Coming Up" was shot on Super8 film in Autumn 1995 by White, and fellow friend and artist, Peter Holt, and released to MuchMusic in 1996.

A tribute to the album can be found in the song "Eric Sleeps," by Australian indie band Youth Group, from their debut album Urban and Eastern.

== Critical reception ==
Trouser Press wrote: "An assured slip of a record that favors full-on distorted rocketry over airy folk-pop and dinky minimalism, Purple Blue merely lacks the tunes that would defer tedium."

== Track listing ==
1. "Introduction Into The..., Pt. 1-4" – 8:13
- a) "Hurt II"
- b) "Grammy"
- c) "Rib Bones"
- d) "Purple Blue"
1. "Hourly" – 2:47
2. "Sixteen Hours" – 3:05
3. "Universe" – 3:08
4. "Eyes Shut" – 1:37
5. "Alone and Annoyed" – 2:12
6. "Lighthouse" – 2:09
7. "Spaceship Opening" – 2:18
8. "Universal Dawn" – 3:32
9. "One Floor Below" – 1:40
10. "Now a Friend" – 1:54
11. "Soon, Coming Closer" – 3:37
12. "Not Yours" – 2:26
13. "Sun Coming Up" – 2:20
14. "Beach" – 4:14

== Personnel ==
- Julie Doiron – bass, vocals
- Mark Gaudet – drums
- Chris Thompson – guitar, vocals
- Rick White – guitar, vocals
