= Malcolm Scott =

Malcolm Scott may refer to:

- Malcolm Scott (politician) (1911–1989), Australian politician
- Malcolm Scott (Australian footballer) (1958–2017), Australian rules football player
- Malcolm Scott (English cricketer) (1936–2020), English cricketer and footballer
- Malcolm Scott (South African cricketer) (born 1947), South African cricketer
- Malcolm Scott (American football) (born 1961), American football player
- Malcolm Scott (entertainer) (1872–1929), English comic entertainer and female impersonator
- Malcolm Scott, musician in The New Grand
- Malcolm Scott, character in 6,000 Enemies
- Malcolm Scott, American golfer (born 2012)

== See also ==
- John Scott (sailor) (John Malcolm Scott, born 1934), Australian Olympic silver medal-winning sailor
- Malcolm Stoddart-Scott (1901–1973), British Conservative Party politician
