= Broken Girl =

Studio album by Julie Doiron
- Released: April 1996
- Recorded: August 1993 ("August 10"), November 1994 ("Soon, Coming Closer"), April 26-29, 1995
- Studio: Little Bullhorn (Ottawa, Ontario); Stereo Mountain (Moncton, New Brunswick)
- Genre: Indie rock
- Length: 27:30
- Label: Sub Pop; Sappy
- Producer: Dave Draves, Rick White (mixing)

Julie Doiron chronology
Broken Girl (1996)	Loneliest in the Morning (1997)

Broken Girl is the debut solo album by Julie Doiron, released in 1996. The album can be considered eponymous, in that Broken Girl was also the stage name Doiron adopted for the album. All of her subsequent albums, however, have been released under her own name.

The song "August 10" became popular on TikTok in late 2024 and early 2025, peaking at No. 12 on the Billboard Hot Rock Songs chart, No. 10 on the Hot Alternative Songs chart, and No. 15 on the Hot Alternative & Rock Songs Chart, as well as No. 14 on the TikTok Billboard Top 50 chart.

Prior to its new-found popularity on TikTok, the album received little commercial and critical success. Julianne Escobedo Shepherd of Pitchfork reviewed Broken Girl in 2003, giving it a rating of 5 out of 10 and denoting it as "an odd release", adding that "it doesn't exactly stand the test of time" stylistically and that "the material is nice enough, but it's lacking in profundity, or really anything beyond nicety".

== Track listing ==
1. "Dance Music" - 2:16
2. "Elevator Show" - 2:20
3. "Crumble" - 1:33
4. "Soon, Coming Closer" - 3:04
5. "August 10" - 2:56
6. "Taller Beauty" - 2:00
7. "Grammy" - 2:20
8. "Grew Smaller" - 2:21
9. "Happy Lucky Girl" - 1:53
10. "Sorry Story" - 1:54
11. "So Low" - 2:55
12. "Waiting for Baby" - 1:58
