= Vague Premonition =

Studio album by Elevator Through
- Released: April 20, 1999
- Recorded: October 1998
- Studios: Chemical, Toronto, ON
- Genres: Rock, indie
- Length: 44:59
- Labels: Sonic Unyon, Sub Pop
- Producer: Rick White

Elevator Through chronology
Eerieconsiliation (1997)	Vague Premonition (1999)	A Taste of Complete Perspective (2000)

Vague Premonition is an album by the Canadian band Elevator Through. The album was released on April 20, 1999, by Sub Pop on CD; it was released in June 1999 by Sonic Unyon on vinyl. Most of the album's songs were recorded in one take. Jack Endino mixed the record at CMS Studios, in Moncton, in November 1998. An expanded reissue of the album was released through Blue Fog Recordings in July 2022, which included the original LP remastered from the original tapes by Rick White, The Such soundtrack extended play, March 1998 Home demos of outtakes of songs originally recorded for the album or The Such soundtrack, which weren't used, as well as included a digital download code for a sequenced home demo version of Vague Premonition, recorded in Spring and Summer, of 1998, which were originally released separately on their own, in 2018.

== Critical reception ==
Professional ratings
Review scores
Source	Rating
AllMusic	4/5 stars
The Province	3/4 stars

In its 4-star review, The Stranger called the album "four a.m. bedspin guitar music at its glorious best." Tom Schulte, in AllMusic, wrote: "From the remote stretches of Canada's New Brunswick, Elevator vaults off on a tube-driven journey into inner space—leave your inhibitions behind and get to know yourself."

Ben Rayner, in the Toronto Star, thought that "Vague Premonition is heavier and more thought-out than the off-the-cuff EPs White originally turned out alone as Elevator to Hell and, while as quiet/loud schizoid as the rest of his output, less prone to loose-limbed, jammy distractions than most of the Elevator recordings that followed, making it the most enjoyable in terms of short-burst journeys to the centre of one's mind." The Telegraph-Journal concluded: "Good, old-fashioned late sixties, journey to the centre of your mind stuff. It's an aural trip with a surprisingly full sound for such a small combo, heavy on the acoustic guitar and organ."

== Track listing ==
1. "Energy"
2. "Rain"
3. "The Maze"
4. "No Good Trying"
5. "Foggy Sea"
6. "Early Raining April Moon"
7. "The Only See to Thought
8. "Comfortable, but Almost"
9. "Cut Out the Wick"
10. "The Grip on Me"
11. "Deep Underground"
12. "Fluidmonogleestran"
13. "Vague Premonition"

== Personnel ==
- Rick White – vocals, guitar, organ, synth, visuals
- Tara Landry – vocals, bass
- Mark Gaudet – vocals, drums, percussion
- Daryl Smith – engineer
- Jack Endino – mixing
