= Poledo =

Canadian alternative rock band

- Origin: Thornhill, Ontario, Canada
- Genres: alternative rock, noise rock
- Years active: 1994–1998
- Labels: Sonic Unyon, Squirtgun
- Past members: Joshua Malinsky; Mitch Roth; Dave Capogna

Poledo was a Canadian alternative rock band based in Thornhill, Ontario, consisting of vocalist and bassist Joshua Malinsky, vocalist and guitarist Mitch Roth, and drummer Dave Capogna. Their music is characterized by loud, heavily distorted guitar riffs and screamed lyrics.

== History ==
Poledo was formed in 1994 in Thornhill. The band released two independent cassettes, Buzz Muffin and Let Up, before signing to Sonic Unyon.

They released the full-length album There, You on Sonic Unyon in 1995, and shared a split 7-inch single, Lunar Landing Confirmed, with Hayden on Toronto's Squirtgun Records in 1996. Both releases charted on Canada's campus radio charts in 1996. The band performed as far west as Vancouver that year.

In March 1997, the band recorded some new songs, which were envisioned for their second album (which never materialized) with Hayden as engineer, which the band would later end up releasing as The Poledo Demos, in 1998. Two of these tracks were re-recordings, originally released on 1994's Buzz Muffin.The band broke up in December 1997; after performing one final show on January 25, 1998, at Club Shanghai in Toronto, Malinsky and Roth both joined Hayden's touring band.

The tracks "Just Don't Care", originally released on 1995's There, You, was re-released on Sonic Unyon's 1998 Now We Are 5 compilation, and the April 29, 1996 recorded track "Herskin", recorded at the same session as "Two Words" (from Lunar Landing Confirmed) was released on Squirtgun Records' More of Our Stupid Noise in 1996.

Malinsky subsequently went solo under the name Kid Lunch, releasing an eponymous CD on Teenage USA in 1999. Malinsky released a second album under the name Kid Lunch, in 2020, titled Volume 2.
