= Smoother (band) =

- Also known as: Sponge
- Origin: Hamilton, Ontario, Canada
- Genre: Rock
- Labels: Sonic Unyon, EMI Music Canada
- Past members: Andrew Franey: Todd Knight; James Strange; Beau Cook; Adam Benning; Roy Felix

Smoother was a Canadian rock band from Hamilton, Ontario, headed by lead vocalist, guitarist, and songwriter Andrew Franey. Members included Beau Cook on bass and vocals, keyboardist James Flemings-Strange, drummer Adam Benning, and Todd Knight on guitar and vocals.

== History ==
Smoother started out with the name Sponge; They signed with Sonic Unyon and recorded an album, Trendbender, in cassette form in 1993 under that name. The band also contributed to a Sonic Union compilation album, Not if I Smell You First.

The band changed its name to Smoother after the American band with the same name began to achieve success in North America. They then released an album, Copycat in 1994 through Sonic Unyon.

Smoother performed at the NXNE festival and Edgefest in 2001. The band's first and only major label release, Chasing the Dragon, was released in 2001 through EMI Canada. The album was well received critically but failed to meet the sales expectations of EMI. The album's single, "East Side", was a hit in Canada, peaking at #11 on Canada's Airplay chart. "East Side" was among the top 70 most played songs on Canadian radio in 2001. The music video for "East Side" reached number 12 on MuchMusic Countdown in September 2001. "East Side" is also featured in the film Men with Brooms. The band was nominated for Best New Group at the 2002 Juno Awards.

== Discography ==
=== Studio albums ===
- Trendbender (as Sponge) (1993, Sonic Unyon)
- Copycat (1994, Sonic Unyon)
- What a Life (1999, Sonic Unyon)
- Chasing the Dragon (2001, EMI Music Canada)

=== Singles ===
- "Electroconfusion" (2000)
- "East Side" (2001)

==== Availability ====
Smoother currently has their album Chasing The Dragon on Spotify and Apple Music.
Smoother currently has their album Copycat on Apple Music.
