= The Memories Attack =

Canadian indie pop duo

- Origin: Halifax, Nova Scotia, Canada
- Genres: Indie pop
- Years active: 2006–present
- Labels: Little Mafia, Noyes, Tumult
- Members: Chris Thompson; Ron Bates
- Website: myspace.com/thememoriesattack

The Memories Attack is a Canadian indie pop duo from Atlantic Canada. The group consists of Eric's Trip guitarist Chris Thompson and Ron Bates of the pop group Orange Glass.

== History ==
Thompson and Bates met during childhood and had worked together previously under Thompson's solo project Moon Socket. They composed their self-titled debut album while living in separate cities, recording in Bates' basement studio when Thompson was able to make the trip to Halifax, Nova Scotia, from his home in Fredericton, New Brunswick. The album appeared on the !earshot National Top 50 chart in January, 2007.

Their music has been described as "hazy, sludgy pop" with an "infectiously upbeat, if delicate, feel".

Their track "Love in the Time of Hate" has been in frequent rotation at CBC Radio 3 and reached No. 1 on the R3-30 chart the week of April 26, 2007.

Their second album was released in December 2008 on East Coast label Noyes Records.

== Discography ==
- 2006: The Memories Attack
- 2008: The Memories Attack
