= Kittens (band) =

Canadian rock band

- Origin: Winnipeg, Manitoba, Canada
- Genres: Noise rock, sludge metal
- Years active: 1992–1999, 2006
- Label: Sonic Unyon
- Past members: Shawn "Pony" Fedorchuk; David "Bazooka" Kelly; Jahmeel Russell; Russ Desjardine; Steve Kellas

Kittens was a Canadian noise rock band from Winnipeg. The band was known for their intense live performances and country-influenced sound.

== History ==
Shawn Fedorchuk, Russ Desjardine, and Steve Kellas started Kittens together after they disbanded their previous band, Batsweat, recruiting drummer David Kelly. Desjardine (who went on to play bass in Artificial Joy and helped found The Bonaduces as the drummer) and Steve then left the band and Jahmeel Russell joined on bass.

Kittens released several albums on Sonic Unyon in the late 1990s. Of all of their albums, the only ones to be released as a vinyl LP were 1997's Bazooka and the Hustler and their split release with Shallow North Dakota, titled Rhinoceros Love. All other albums were released either on cassette or compact disc. The group disbanded in 1999.

Kittens played two reunion shows in 2006 with KEN mode's Jesse Matthewson replacing Russell on bass. Russell is now a member of Red Vienna after stints in Projektor and Actors. David Kelly died in Los Angeles, California, in March 2008.

In 2014, Blunderspublik released a cover album, Kittens and Shit, commemorating Winnipeg's 1990s bands, including Kittens.

== Members ==
- Jahmeel Russell - vocals, bass (1995—1999)
- Shawn Fedorchuk - vocals, guitar (1992—1999, 2006)
- David Kelly - drums (1992—1999, 2006)
- Russ Desjardine - bass (1992—1995)
- Steve Kellas - guitar, bass (1992—1995)
- Jesse Matthewson - bass (2006)

== Discography ==
=== Studio albums ===
- Doberman (1994)
- Tiger Comet (1995)
- Rhinoceros Love with Shallow North Dakota (1996)
- Bazooka and The Hustler (1997)
- The Night Danger Album (1998)

=== Singles & EPs ===
- Pony (1993)
- Grizzly (1993)
- "Calico" (1995)
- Hawaii (1997)

=== Compilations ===
- Low-Fi Classics & Other Rarities (1998)
