= Eerieconsiliation =

Studio album by Elevator
- Released: September 9, 1997
- Recorded: February 1997
- Genres: Psychedelic rock, lo-fi
- Length: 41:57
- Label: Sub Pop (SP399)

Elevator chronology
Parts 1–3 (1996)	Eerieconsiliation (1997)	Vague Premonition (1999)

Eerieconsiliation is an album by Elevator to Hell. It was released on September 9, 1997, via Sub Pop.

The album was recorded in February 1997 in the "Xanadu Room," with some songs re-recorded live on March 16, at a Domar Transmission warehouse.

== Critical reception ==
Professional ratings
Review scores
Source	Rating
AllMusic	3/5 stars
MusicHound Rock: The Essential Album Guide	3.5/5 stars

CMJ wrote: "Upbeat songs like 'The Cloud' and 'Every Channel' showcase the band's rock roots, while the slow grinding 'Backteeth' is an addictive bass-driven number that explodes into a compact, but inspired, guitar eulogy before the band lets the listener go." The St. Catharines Standard wrote that "[Rick] White is like a patient spider, spinning his musical web unassumingly in the deepest attics of human experience, knowing that eventually we will venture there."

== Track listing ==
All songs written by Rick White, except where noted.

1. "The Cloud" – 2:40
2. "To Breath" – 2:00
3. "Every Channel" – 2:15
4. "Hurricane" – 1:49
5. "Suddenly" – 2:16
6. "Backteeth" – 4:06
7. "Bad Thoughts Coming Down" – 1:25
8. "Inevitably" – 2:19
9. "Sleep Experiment Number One" – 3:02
10. "Window" – 1:48
11. "Fifties Lady" – 2:36
12. "Here to Here" (Mark Gaudet) – 3:43
13. "The Time Is Grey" – 3:25
14. "The Hole" – 1:22
15. "Second Conscience" – 2:43
16. "I've Gone for a Ride" – 4:38

== Personnel ==
- Rick White – guitar, vocals, organ, engineering, mixing, album art and photography
- Mark Gaudet – drums, vocals on "Here to Here"
- Tara White – bass, vocals, album photography
