= The Ghost Is Dancing =

- Origin: Toronto, Ontario, Canada
- Genres: Indie pop Indie rock
- Years active: 2004–2010
- Labels: Sonic Unyon
- Past members: Kevin Corlis; Jamie Matechuk; Odie Ouderkirk; Eric Krumins; Lesley Davies; Dave Kates; Jim DeLuca; Gabrielle Nadeau; Alt Altman; Ben Deschamps; Patrick McGroarty; Jasmine Landau
- Website: theghostisdancing.com

The Ghost Is Dancing was a Canadian indie-pop band from Toronto, Ontario. The band had as many as ten members, many of whom were also in other bands.

== History ==
The Ghost Is Dancing started out playing and improvising at a French Avenue, Toronto, student apartment in 2002. Their first show was performed in August 2004 at the time the members were living in the apartment. The original lineup consisted of Kevin Corlis on drums, Jim DeLuca and Jamie Matechuk on guitar and vocals, Odie Ouderkirk on keyboard, Eric Krumins on bass, Jasmine Landau on trumpet and violin, and Gabrielle Nadeau on accordion. Since then, The Ghost Is Dancing has gathered considerable speed (and size), playing shows with The Hidden Cameras, Rogue Wave and The Most Serene Republic, and adding multi-instrumentalists Alt Altman, Ben Deschamps and backing vocalist Lesley Davies. Davies, Corlis and Matechuk were all childhood friends from Niagara Falls, Ontario; Ouderkirk and DeLuca also hail from there.

Their self-titled EP was released in January 2006. They released their debut full-length album, The Darkest Spark, produced by Dale Morningstar, in June 2007. This album received generally good reviews, but, with so many members with different influences contributing it was criticized as being a little unfocused.

DeLuca, Nadeau and Deschamps left the band before the recording of the 2009 album, Battles On. for which the group worked with producer Chris Stringer. Reflecting the reduction to six band members, and two more years playing together, the band had developed a tighter, more distinctive style.

== Discography ==
=== EPs ===
- The City Waltz (EP) (2004)
- The Ghost Is Dancing [EP] (2006)

=== Albums ===
- The Darkest Spark (2007)
- Battles On (2009)

== See also ==
- Canadian musical groups
- Canadian rock
- List of Canadian musicians
- List of bands from Canada
