= Never Mind the Molluscs =

Compilation album by Sub Pop Records
- Released: March 1993
- Recorded: January 14–16, 1993
- Studios: Solar Audio Studios, Halifax, NS
- Genres: Alternative rock, indie rock
- Length: 15:17
- Label: Sub Pop
- Producers: Bob Weston, Mike Nichols

Sub Pop Records chronology
The Grunge Years (1991)	Never Mind the Molluscs (1993)	Hype! (1996)

Never Mind the Molluscs is a compilation EP released in March 1993 on Sub Pop Records. Released as part of the Halifax Pop Explosion movement of the early 1990s, the EP featured four songs by emerging alternative rock bands from Halifax, Nova Scotia and Moncton, New Brunswick. Two of the featured bands, Jale and Eric's Trip, were signed directly to Sub Pop, while Sloan were signed to Geffen Records; the fourth band, Idée du Nord, were the only contributors to the compilation who never became widely known outside of the Maritime scene.

The studio sessions for this EP were done in Halifax, Nova Scotia, at Solar Audio Recording Studios. Bob Weston produced and engineered the session, while Mike Nichols assisted in engineering the session.The sessions wrapped up 7 hours earlier than anticipated. During these sessions, after initially passing on an offer to sign to Sub Pop in October 1992, Eric's Trip signed to Sub Pop.

Bob Weston had issues with Customs when bringing his recording equipment over the border.

The cover artwork was designed by Andrew Scott.

Eric's Trip contributed a medley of two separate songs, "Blue Sky for Julie/Smother", to the album. This version of "Smother" is a newer recording. The band first recorded "Smother" in July 1992.

Sloan later covered "Smother" for the Geffen Records compilation album DGC Rarities Volume 1; their version recombined "Smother" into a medley with a different Eric's Trip song, "Stove" from the album Love Tara.

== Track listing ==
1. Sloan, "Pillow Fight"
2. Jale, "Lung"
3. Eric's Trip, "Blue Sky for Julie/Smother"
4. Idée du Nord, "Iodine Eyes"
