= Mayor McCA =

Canadian musician, actor, and artist

Mayor McCa
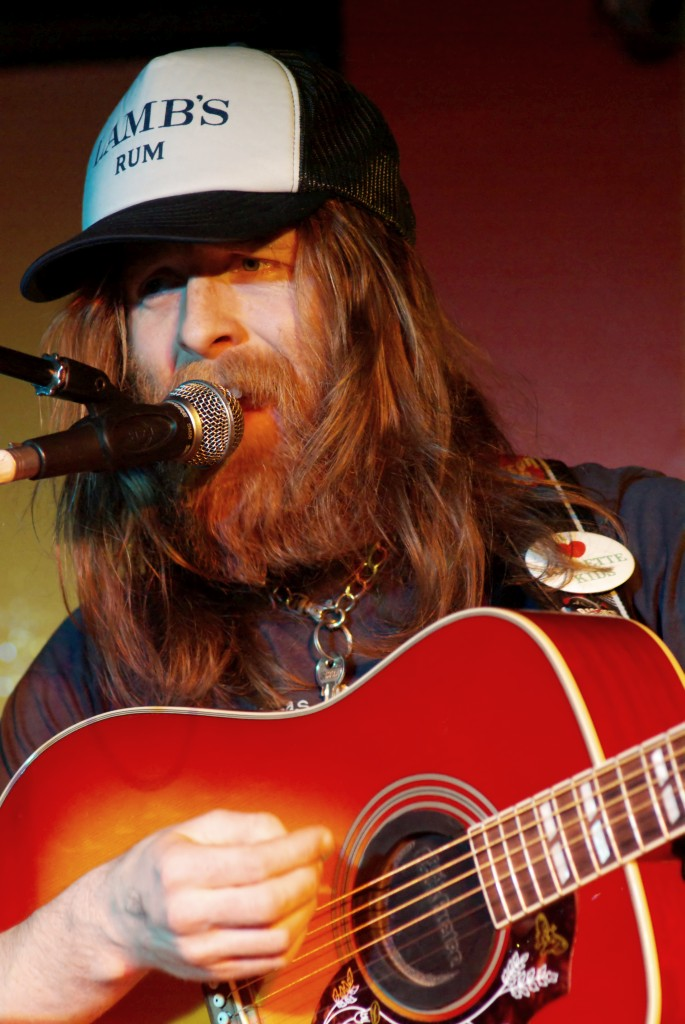
- Mayor McCa playing at the 100 Club in London

Background information
- Also known as: C.A. Smith, Dr. Furr, Mr. Handsome
- Born: Christian Anderson Smith; Hamilton, Ontario, Canada
- Origin: Hamilton, Ontario, Canada
- Occupations: Singer-songwriter, actor, cartoonist
- Instruments: Vocals, guitar, organ, bass pedals, drums, ukulele, harmonica, clarinet, tap dancing
- Years active: 1996–2012
- Label: We Are Busy Bodies
- Website: www.mayormcca.com

Mayor McCa (born Christian Anderson Smith) is a Canadian musician, writer, cartoonist, animator, actor and onetime mayoral candidate from Hamilton, Ontario. He mostly performs as a one-man band. Mayor McCa currently lives and performs in London, England.

== Early life ==
Smith was born in Hamilton, Ontario. He was a member of a high school band, Gorp.

== Career ==
McCa released his second album, Me is He in 2000, to mixed reviews. That year he ran for mayor of Hamilton. One of McCa's campaign pledges was to rename Hamilton as the home of Canadian rock and roll, Donut Rock City (a riff on Hamilton being the home of the first Tim Hortons store). McCa lost, polling eighth out of twelve candidates.

His music has been playlisted on CBC Radio 3. He signed with the Sonic Unyon label, and performed in Toronto in 2001 at Lee's Palace with labelmates Rocket Science, Chore and SectorSeven. He appeared Sonic Unyon's anniversary compilation Now We Are 5. In 2003 he released an album, El Limb Men Oh Pee. The album appeared on the !earshot National Top 50 chart. McCa toured across Canada in support of the album, returning to Hamilton in December.

McCa moved to the United Kingdom in 2005; in 2006 he released his album Cue Are Es Tea You, and by 2007 McCa was performing there in clubs and bars.

He toured with Finger Eleven, Noisettes, Feist, Slow Club, Nick Oliveri and Blag Dahlia, as well as appearing at the Secret Garden Party festival. He recently toured with Bob Log III and The Magic Numbers in early 2009. He has also played extensively in Canada.

On 15 February 2010, McCa released his hand-made animated video for the song, "Drinkalottawater". The video was directed by Dean Chalkley and Yemisi Brookes.

In early 2012 the Mayor retired his one-man band but carried on writing songs under C.A. Smith. He released his first singles, "Time" and "Judge Judy" on Records Records Records. His debut album, "Someone You Love" was released on We Are Busy Bodies in North America. It was released worldwide in November 2012.

== Discography ==
- Demo-lition- demo-cassette (1996)
- Busboy (album)|Busboy (1997)
- Welcome to McCALand (1999)
- Me is He (2001)
- El Limb Men Oh Pee (2003)
- Do's and Dues: Demo-lition 2–6 track demo (2005)
- Cue Are Es Tea You (2006)
