= Sappy Records =

Canadian independent record label

- Founded: 1990
- Founder: Julie Doiron
- Genre: Indie rock Folk rock
- Country of origin: Canada
- Location: Sackville, New Brunswick
- Official website: http://www.sappyrecords.com

Sappy Records is an independent record label based in Sackville, New Brunswick, Canada, started by Julie Doiron in 1990 in order to release her own cassette.

The first 7" vinyl release was "Julie and the Porthole to Dimentia" in 1993, which featured a track each by the members of Eric's Trip.

In 1994, Jon Claytor and Julie Doiron became business partners and ran the label together until 2000.

The label lay dormant for a number of years after Julie Doiron won a Juno Award for Julie Doiron and the Wooden Stars in 2000, and subsequently signed to Endearing Records in Canada and Jagjaguwar internationally. The label was restarted in 2006 by Julie Doiron, Jon Claytor and Paul Henderson.

Sappy Records also hosts the Sappy Records Music Festival (or SappyFest) in Sackville, New Brunswick, and has featured notable acts such as The Arcade Fire, Holy Fuck, The Acorn, Attack in Black, Chad VanGaalen, Old Man Luedecke, Ohbijou and Wintersleep. It takes place in the summer.

== Roster ==
- Broken Girl
- Elevator
- Eric's Trip
- The Inbreds
- Julie Doiron
- Lonnie James
- Lousy
- Moon Socket
- Orange Glass
- The Peter Parkers
- Shotgun & Jaybird
- Snailhouse
- Thee Suddens
- Wooden Stars

== Discography ==
SAP00A Orange Glass - Orange Glass (7")
SAP001 Stereo Mountain - Julie And The Porthole To Dimentia (7", EP)
SAP002 Broken Girl - Dog Love Part II (7")
SAP003 Moon Socket - Moon Socket (cassette)
SAP004 Moon Socket - Spaced-Odd-Ditties (7")
SAP005 Elevator To Hell - Forward To Snow (7")
SAP006 Broken Girl - Nora (7")
SAP007 The Suddens - How Things Go (7")
SAP008 Snailhouse - Snailhouse (7")
SAP009 Broken Girl - Broken Girl (CD)
SAP010 Orange Glass - Circle Dance (7")
SAP011 Orange Glass - Meet The Robot (7")
SAP012 Moon Socket - The Best Thing (CD)
SAP013 Lousy - Lousy (7")
SAP014 Elevator To Hell - Backwards May (7")
SAP015 The Inbreds - Double Yolk (7")
SAP016 Wooden Stars - Mardi Grad (CD)
SAP017 Eric's Trip - Long Days Ride Till Tomorrow (CD)
SAP018 Lonnie James – Remember Not To Forget (7")
SAP019 The Peter Parkers - Evolve Or Be ... Kicked Out Of The Continuum (7")
SAP020 Julie Doiron and the Wooden Stars - Julie Doiron and the Wooden Stars (CD)
[no cat#] The Peter Parkers – The Exact Dimensions Of Hell (1997, cass)
[no cat#] Eric's Trip/Sloan – Eric's Trip/Sloan (1993, 7")
SAPPY001 Shotgun & Jaybird - There Are Days And Then There Are Days (CD, Maxi)
SAPPY002 Shotgun & Jaybird - ''Trying To Get Somewhere'' (CD)
SAPPY003 Various – Do You Want To Talk All Night? A Sappy Records Tribute To Snailhouse (CD)

== See also ==
- List of record labels
