= Shawn Fedorchuk =

Canadian editor, filmmaker, and musician (born 1973)

- Born: April 11, 1973 (age 53); Winnipeg, Manitoba
- Years active: 1990–present
- Known for: Title sequence design, television visual effects, filmmaking
- Notable work: True Blood, The Grid
- Awards: Nominated for three Primetime Emmy Awards
- Musical career
- Instruments: Vocals, guitar
- Formerly of: Kittens

Shawn Fedorchuk (feh-DOR-chuck; born April 11, 1973) is a Canadian editor, visual effects artist, director, and musician. He has been nominated for three Primetime Emmy Awards for his work in television, including twice in the Outstanding Title Design category.

== Career ==
In the mid to late 2000s, Fedorchuk worked on opening title sequences for several television series. His credits include The Grid and True Blood, where he contributed as a title designer and editor, respectively.

Year	Title	Role	Notes
2004	The Grid	Title designer	Miniseries
2008	True Blood	Editor	Opening titles

As a musician, Fedorchuk was the vocalist, guitarist and co-founder of the Winnipeg-based noise rock band Kittens. The band was active from 1992 to 1998 and later reunited for two performances in 2006.
