= Squirtgun Records =

Former independent record label

Squirtgun Records was an independent record label founded by Lee Maslin in 1994 specializing largely in releases by Canadian rock bands.

Artists who have worked with the label include Shortfall, hHead, Scratching Post, Treble Charger, Radioblaster, Versus, Speedbuggy, Poledo, Lou Barlow, Elevator To Hell, Noah's Arkweld, Moon Socket, The New Grand, Orange Glass, Thee Suddens, Purple Knight, Hip Club Groove, Eric's Trip, Len, Squirrel, Julie Doiron, Hayden, Public Animal, José Contreras and By Divine Right.
