= Scratching Post =

Canadian alternative rock band

Scratching Post was a Canadian alternative rock band from London, Ontario, active in the 1990s.

The band was formed by vocalist and songwriter Nicole Hughes, its only consistent member, in 1992. It did not have a stable lineup in its early years; its most noted lineup, including guitarist Mark Holman, drummer Jeff Depew and bassist Phil Zeller, came together for the band's second album. Zeller remained with the band for most of its span but also played with side-project Dead Season in the late 1990s and Radio Holiday in the early 2000s.

The band released a self-titled EP June 6, 1995, and then moved to Toronto before following up with their full-length debut Flamethrower March 15, 1996 on Squirtgun Records. The album led to a record deal with The Enclave in the United States, but the label folded before it could actually release the band's second album. After getting back ownership of the album's masters, they released Destruction of the Universe on Squirtgun in 1998; the band's most successful album, it spawned the Canadian alternative rock and campus radio hit "Bloodflame". They supported the album with a cross-Canada tour as an opening act for Big Sugar.

Their third and final album, This Time It's Personal, was produced by Chris and Drew Peters and released in 2000.
