= Shallow North Dakota =

Canadian rock band

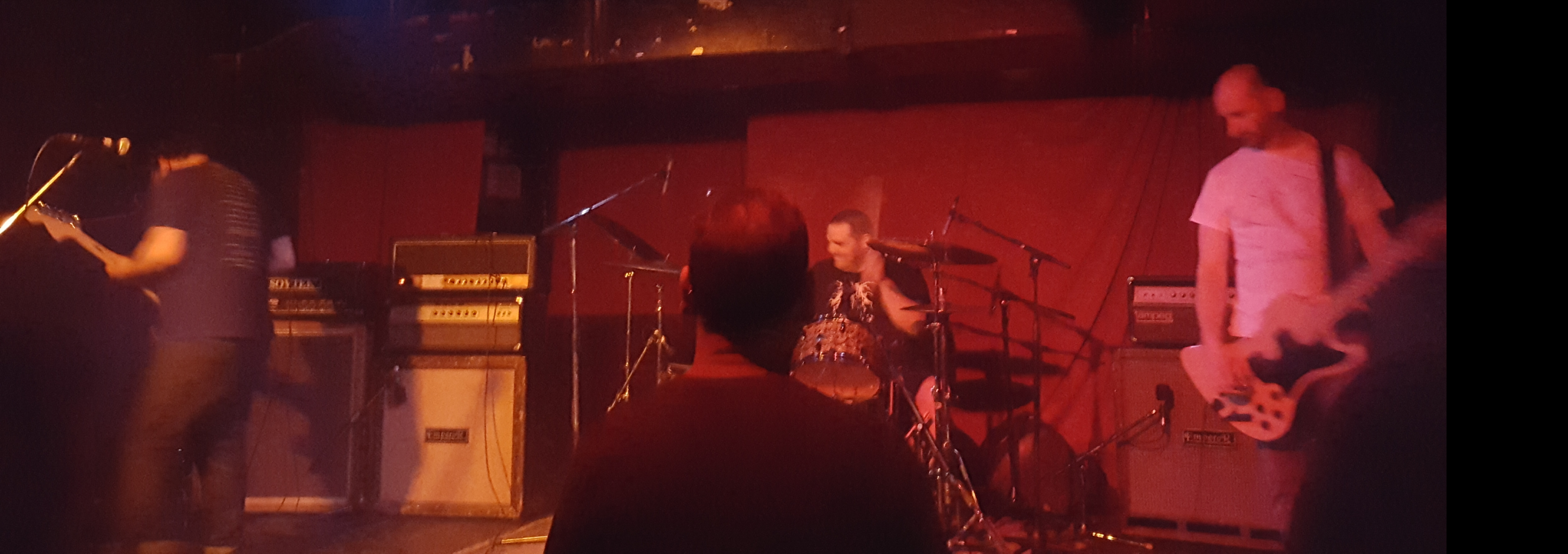
- Shallow North Dakota performing in 2019

Background information
- Also known as: Shallow; Shallow N.D.; Shallow, North Dakota
- Origin: Hamilton, Ontario, Canada
- Genres: Noise rock; sludge metal
- Years active: 1993–2005; 2018–2019
- Labels: Sonic Unyon
- Past members: Biff Young; Dan Dunham; Tony Jacome

Shallow North Dakota was a Canadian noise rock/sludge metal band from Hamilton, Ontario. The band was known for its loud, aggressive music and live shows, which often included destroying stage equipment.

== History ==
Shallow North Dakota was formed in Hamilton in 1993 by Tony Jacome (vocals, drums), Dan Dunham (guitar), and Biff Young (bass). In 1994, the band released their debut album, Auto Body Crusher, on local label Sonic Unyon, following it up with This Apparatus Must Be Earthed in 1997. Throughout the decade, the band toured with other Canadian noise rock acts like Chore and Kittens. The band's cover of the Sugarloaf song "Green Eyed Lady" was featured on Sonic Unyon's 1998 compilation Sonic Unyon: Now We Are 5.

In 2004, Shallow North Dakota released their third album, Mob Wheel. It was distributed to retail shops in Canada via their previous label, Sonic Unyon. The group disbanded the following year.

On October 13, 2018, the band reunited to perform at a friend's birthday party, after which they played a series of shows in Western Canada with KEN mode. They played their final show on April 13, 2019, at La Vitrola in Montreal.

The band's song "Backbone" was featured on Sonic Unyon's 2019 compilation Sonic Unyon: Now We Are 25.

In January 2021, Tony Jacome was diagnosed with terminal pancreatic cancer. That same month, Wordclock Records released a 3-track EP entitled Shallow North Dakota // KEN Mode // Kowloon Walled City to raise money for Jacome and his family. The EP featured a previously unreleased track, "Burly Bearded Man", along with KEN mode's cover of "Outside Dakota / Six Foot Foam Lover" and Kowloon Walled City's cover of "The Milkman". Jacome died on October 2, 2021, at age 45.

A tribute album entitled Rhino Body Lover: A Tribute to Shallow North Dakota, featuring artists like Conan Neutron, SIANspheric, Bison, and Fuck the Facts was released on January 21, 2022.

== Discography ==
=== Albums ===
- Auto Body Crusher (1994)
- This Apparatus Must Be Earthed (1997)
- Mob Wheel (2004)

=== Singles and EPs ===
- Pop the Hood (1993)
- "Gleam" (1994)
- Rhinoceros Love (with Kittens) (1996)
- Shallow North Dakota // KEN Mode // Kowloon Walled City (with KEN mode and Kowloon Walled City) (2021)
