= Eric's Trip =

Canadian indie rock band

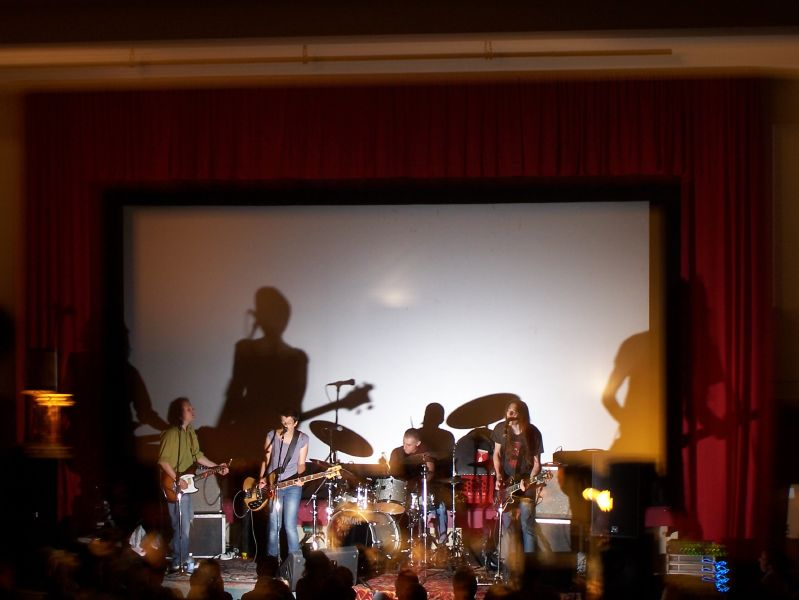
- Eric's Trip live in 2006.

Background information
- Also known as: Stereo Mountain
- Origin: Moncton, New Brunswick
- Genres: Indie rock, noise pop, shoegaze, grunge
- Years active: 1990–1996, 2001, 2006–2009
- Labels: Sub Pop, Sappy, Great Beyond, Sonic Unyon, Murderecords, Squirtgun Records
- Members: Rick White; Julie Doiron; Chris Thompson; Mark Gaudet
- Past members: Ed Vaughan

Eric's Trip is a Canadian indie rock band from Moncton, New Brunswick. Eric's Trip achieved prominence as the first Canadian band to be signed to Seattle's flagship grunge label Sub Pop in the early 1990s.

The band had a minor hit in alternative circles with the single "View Master", from the 1994 album Forever Again.

== History ==
Eric's Trip formed in 1990 when musicians Rick White and Chris Thompson joined Julie Doiron and Ed Vaughan (who was later replaced by Mark Gaudet). They took their name from a Sonic Youth song and developed a unique sound which fused elements of the distorted guitar of Dinosaur Jr., vocal elements of My Bloody Valentine, the folk leanings of Neil Young, and the lo-fi aesthetic of Sebadoh. White described their sound as "sappy melodic pop music on top of thick distortion." Gaudet's description was more succinct: "dreamy punk".

The band released their first full-length album, Love Tara, in 1993., their second LP, Forever Again, in 1994, and their final studio LP Purple Blue in 1996. In between, Eric's Trip played the 1995 edition of the Tragically Hip's Another Roadside Attraction (festival) tour.

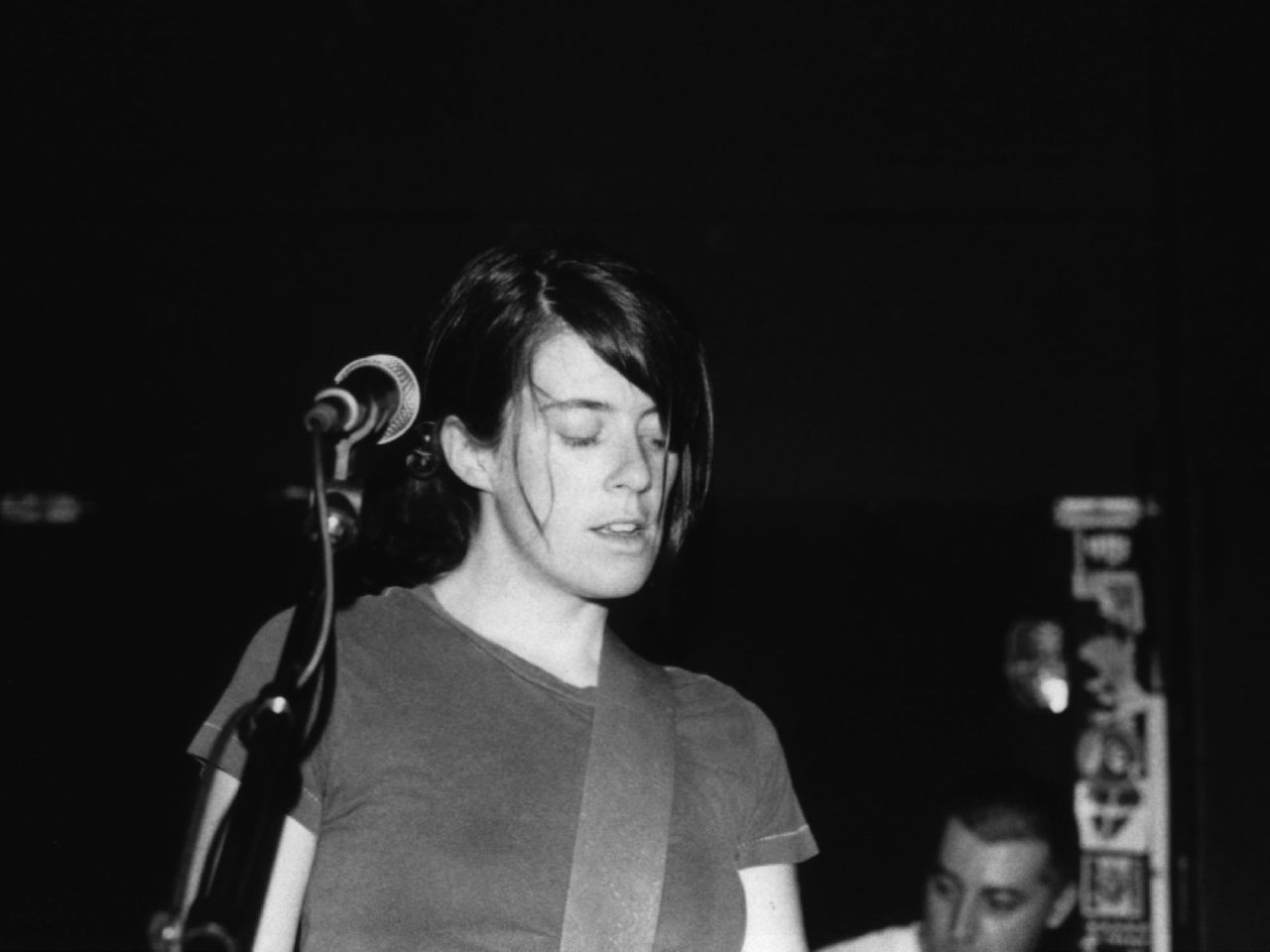
Julie Doiron plays with Eric's Trip in Saskatoon, 2001

Eric's Trip broke up in 1996, in the middle of their US tour and played a final hometown show in June, 1996 prior to reuniting in 2001. In 1997, as part of their contract with Sub Pop, they released the rarities compilation CD, Long Days Ride 'Til Tomorrow, which was being discussed at their final show in 1996. They also played a series of shows between 2006 and 2009. These included a show at the 2007 Halifax Pop Explosion and the 2008 edition of Primavera Sound in Barcelona, Spain and the SP20, a 20th anniversary concert for Sub Pop Records that took place in Redmond, Washington.

They played at the Sappy Records Festival in Sackville, New Brunswick from 2006 to 2009, with their final performance as a band occurring at the 2009 edition of the festival. In 2010, both White and Doiron played separate sets at SappyFest.

== Post Eric's Trip projects and legacy ==
Doiron currently has a successful solo career; in 1999, she recorded the album Julie Doiron and the Wooden Stars with the Ottawa band Wooden Stars, which won a Juno Award for Best Alternative Album of the Year, and from 2003 to 2007 she performed with Shotgun & Jaybird.

White began working on an Eric's Trip documentary movie, titled Eric's Trip: 1990-1996 in 2004, with initial screenings of the documentary video being shown in 2008 at that years' Sappyfest. While a DVD version of the movie was originally planned, it didn't materialize, and Eric's Trip: 1990-1996 was instead eventually released for viewing free online in December 2012 on Vimeo. In 2021, White re-edited & remastered the movie, and released the updated version on Vimeo. The 2021 version also excised some parts that were in the originally released version.

White and Gaudet played in Elevator until 2009, when White announced the band's dissolution at that year's SappyFest. Since then, White has also released three solo albums under the name Rick White Album, The Rick White Album, Memoreaper and 137 during, and after Elevator. Gaudet currently plays in the heavy metal band Funeral Fog. Thompson enjoyed some fame as Moon Socket, and currently plays in The Memories Attack with Ron Bates of Moncton band Orange Glass, as well as the band Diamondtown.

White produced Doiron's solo albums Woke Myself Up (2007) and I Can Wonder What You Did with Your Day (2009). Woke Myself Up features three tracks on which the entire Eric's Trip lineup contributed to the recording, their first studio collaboration since the band's 1996 breakup, while I Can Wonder has been described by critics as directly revisiting the sound and style of Eric's Trip for the first time in Doiron's solo career.

A cassette tribute album titled The Eric's Trip Show was released by Paper Heart Records in 2000. A two-disc CD tribute album titled Songs For Eric: A Tribute to Eric's Trip was released by Gooseberry Records in April 2009.

== Band members ==
Current

- Rick White – vocals, guitar (1990–present)
- Julie Doiron – vocals, bass, guitar (1990–present)
- Chris Thompson – guitar, bass, vocals, drums (1990–present)
- Mark Gaudet – drums, vocals (1991–present)

Former

- Ed Vaughan – drums (1990–1991)

Timeline

== Discography ==
=== Albums ===
- Love Tara (Sub Pop) – November 1993
- Forever Again (Sub Pop) – September 1994
- Purple Blue (Sub Pop) – January 1996

=== EPs/cassettes ===
- Eric's Trip cassette (Independent) – December 1990
- Catapillars EP cassette (Independent) – April 1991
- Drowning EP cassette (Independent) – August 1991
- Warm Girl cassette (Independent) – January 1992
- Belong 7-inch EP (NIM) – April 1992
- Peter cassette/CD (Murderecords), LP (Sub Pop Germany) – April 1993
- Songs About Chris 7-inch EP (4 songs) / CD5 (6 songs) (Sub Pop) – May 1993
- Julie and the Porthole to Dimentia 7-inch EP (One solo track by each of the four members) (Sappy Records) – July 1993
- Trapped In New York 7-inch EP (Summershine Records) – 1993
- Warm Girl 7-inch EP (Derivative) – 1993
- The Gordon Street Haunting 7-inch EP / CD5 (Sub Pop) – May 1994
- The Road South 7-inch EP (Sonic Unyon) – August 1995

=== Splits ===
- "Laying Blame" b/w Stove-Smother Split 7-inch with Sloan (Cinnamon Toast Records) – 1994
- Pillow (Red) b/w Payday and Don't Spook the Horse... Split 7-inch with Moviola (metoo! records) – 1996

=== Lives ===
- The Eric's Trip Show live CD (Teenage USA) – 2001
- Live in Concert November 4th, 2001 live CD (Great Beyond) – 2001
- Live at The Esquire May 1995 live archival digital streaming release (no label) – January 2020
- Live in Montreal - March 16th, 1993 live archival digital streaming release (no label) – October 2022
- Live In Halifax March 17, 1992 live archival digital streaming release (no label) – May 2025
- Live at Pop Montreal 2007 live archival digital streaming release (no label) – May 2025

=== Compilations ===
- "Sickness" featured on Naked in the Marsh 10-inch Compilation of Moncton bands, 500 copies on green vinyl (NIM) – 1991
- "Understanding" featured on Raw Energy CD Compilation (Raw Energy Records) – 1993
- "Blue Sky for Julie/Smother" featured on Never Mind the Molluscs East Coast Compilation Double 7-inch set/CD (Sub Pop) – 1993
- "Blue Sky for Julie/Smother" featured on Sub Pop Employee of the Month Compilation CD/LP (Sub Pop) – 1993
- "Laying Blame" featured on Trim Crusts if Desired East Coast CD Compilation (Cinnamon Toast Records) – 1994
- "Evie" featured on Not If I Smell You First CD Compilation (Sonic Unyon) – August 1995
- "If You Don't Want Me" featured on Teenage Zit Rock Angst Compilation LP/CD/8-track (Nardwuar the Human Serviette/Mint Records) – 1995
- "So Easier Last Time" featured on More of Our Stupid Noise Squirtgun Records – 1996
- "Universe" featured on The Boys Club Soundtrack – 1996
- "New Love" (remix) & "We're Only Gonna Die" (live in Montreal '94) featured on "The Stareoscopic Scary Show - An Audiological View Of Moncton N.B." (No label, SSSCD 197-2, released independently by Rick White)
- Long Days Ride 'Till Tomorrow (Sappy Records) – 1997

== See also ==
- Music of Canada
- Canadian rock
- List of Canadian musicians
- List of bands from Canada
- Category:Canadian musical groups
