= Chris Thompson (Canadian musician) =

Canadian musician (born 1971)

- Born: July 4, 1971 (age 54); Ottawa, Ontario, Canada
- Origin: Moncton, New Brunswick, Canada
- Genres: Indie rock, noise pop, alternative rock
- Occupation(s): musician, singer-songwriter
- Instrument(s): Drums, vocals, guitar, bass
- Labels: Sub Pop; Sappy

Chris Thompson (born July 4, 1971) is a Canadian musician who has performed in a variety of Maritime bands, including Eric's Trip, The Memories Attack, Orange Glass, and his solo project Moon Socket. Although Thompson was born in Ottawa, his family moved to Moncton, New Brunswick when he was five years old. Thompson began Moon Socket before Eric's Trip had broken up.

Thompson contributed to former Eric's Trip bandmate Julie Doiron's 2007 album Woke Myself Up.

As of 2022, Thompson is also a member of the rock bands Diamondtown since September 2018, and Gemstones, since February 2021.

== Moon Socket discography ==
=== LPs ===
- Moon Socket (1995)
- The Best Thing (1996)
- Take the Mountain Squirtgun Records (1997)
- Eurydice (2015)

=== EPs ===
- Spaced-Odd-Ditties (1993)
- Moon Socket (1995)
- Moon Socket (1995)
- It's the End of the Trip (1997)

=== Singles ===
- "Accept Fear" (1995)
- "Feeling Around" (1995)
- "I Want Now" (1996)

== See also ==
- Music of Canada
- Canadian rock
- List of Canadian musicians
