= Sonic Unyon =

Canadian record label

- Founded: 1993
- Founder: Sandy McIntosh; Mark Milne
- Distributor: Universal Music
- Genre: Alternative; Indie
- Country of origin: Canada
- Location: Hamilton, Ontario
- Official website: sonicunyon.com

Sonic Unyon is an independent record label based in Hamilton, Ontario, Canada. The label carved out a reputation in the 1990s with releases by bands including Hayden, Treble Charger, Sianspheric, Shallow North Dakota, Kittens, Chore, The Dinner Is Ruined, Eric's Trip, Tricky Woo, Thrush Hermit, and Frank Black and the Catholics.

== History ==
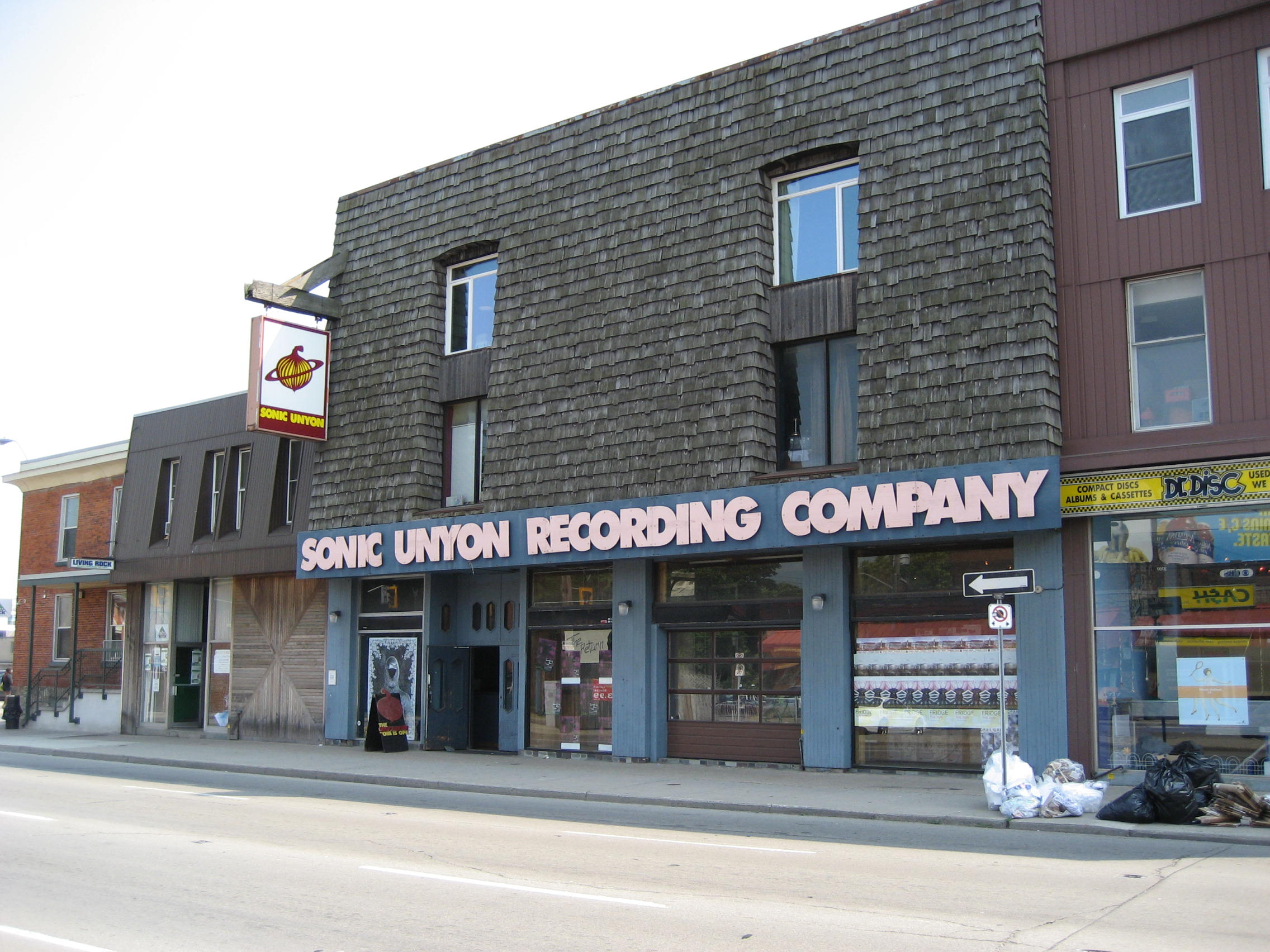
Label headquarters (1997-2017), on Wilson Street, downtown Hamilton, Ontario

=== Formation ===
Sonic Unyon was founded in Burlington, Ontario in 1993 by Mark Milne and Sandy McIntosh, guitarists of the band Tristan Psionic. (The label’s name was inspired by the title of a Guitar Player magazine interview with My Bloody Valentine guitarist Kevin Shields.) Sonic Unyon's ownership expanded six months later with the addition of partner Tim Potocic, the band’s drummer. Each put up $2,000 and the company took its first steps. Sonic Unyon was initially headquartered in Milne’s bedroom closet, and later his mother's basement furnace room.

=== The Early Years (1993-1999) ===
At first, Sonic Unyon exclusively released Tristan Psionic's music, but the label soon began releasing and promoting music by other local bands. Sonic Unyon's first eight releases were issued on individually dubbed, hand-packaged cassettes. The label's first vinyl pressing was a 7" sampler released in 1994. A compilation, the label's tenth release, followed later that year on compact disc.

Sonic Unyon regularly organized concerts in traditional and non-traditional spaces featuring artists on the label's roster, but became increasingly ambitious as momentum behind the young label grew. The label’s first large-scale event, Woolsock, was a one-day festival held in a farm field south of Campbellville, Ontario on August 20, 1994. The lineup included Change of Heart, Gorp, Shallow, Smoother, Spool, Treble Charger, 13 Engines, and Tristan Psionic. Woolsock ’95 was staged a year after the initial Woolsock, this time at a rural property in Pelham, Ontario. Following logistical hurdles, the festival ultimately relocated to Hamilton’s X-Club. The event featured Another White Male, Choke To Start, Gorp, Hayden, hHead, Hip Club Groove, Kittens, Kottmeier, The Mercury Men, Monster Voodoo Machine, The New Grand, Poledo, Project 9, Rheostatics, Shallow, Sianspheric, Smoother, Sparkmarker, Treble Charger, and Tristan Psionic.

In honour of the label’s second anniversary, Sonic Unyon rented the 44-meter yacht Captain Matthew Flinders for a floating party tour of Toronto’s waters on September 17, 1995. Bands playing that party included Change of Heart, Die Cheerleader, and Huevos Rancheros.

By 1995, Sonic Unyon had grown to be one of the largest independent labels in Canada. In 1997, Sonic Unyon’s partners moved to a three-storey 14,000-square-foot commercial building at 22 Wilson Street near James Street North in downtown Hamilton thanks in part to a friendly relationship with then-owner Sam Manson, whose namesake sporting goods store had closed at the same address three years earlier. The label, which had been operating out of a warehouse in Hamilton’s Corktown neighbourhood, was able to purchase the Wilson Street building after being granted a year of rent-free tenancy there. The basement of their headquarters often held shows, and many local musicians got jobs working for the record label and some would go on to operate their own record labels out of the building.

On October 3, 1998, Sonic Unyon marked the label’s fifth anniversary with a celebration that included the release of the Now We Are 5 compilation, the grand opening of the Sonic Unyon Record Store (located on the main level of 22 Wilson Street), an all-ages show at its headquarters, and a licensed concert in an upstairs hall of the nearby Fortune Village restaurant. The latter concert featured sets from Blonde Redhead, Danko Jones, The Mooney Suzuki, The New Grand, Bill Priddle, Julie Doiron, Thrush Hermit, and Tristan Psionic. The concert’s lineup had initially included The Flaming Lips’ Boombox Experiment, but the band ended that series five nights earlier in Boston, Massachusetts and did not appear in the final lineup.

Sonic Unyon zine The Stink, produced by label staff, was used to showcase company news, upcoming events and releases, artist Q&As and touring updates, nation-wide scene reports, independent label profiles, and Sonic Unyon's ever-growing mail order catalog. The direct-mail newsletter, published every one to three months, was used to contact media and fans across Canada in the label's early days. The zine was discontinued following the opening of the label's in-house record shop, launch of an associated website, and the dawn of the distribution era.

Sonic Unyon's zeitgeisty late-'90s releases included iconic albums from Hayden (Everything I Long For, 1994), Treble Charger (NC17, 1994), Sianspheric (Somnium, 1995), Tricky Woo (Sometimes I Cry, 1999), and Thrush Hermit (Clayton Park, 1999). The label's "golden age" output has garnered enduring critical recognition.

Capping this period, the label's releases earned three of five nominations for Best Alternative Album at the Juno Awards of 2000 (alumnus Danko Jones also scored a nomination), with Sonic Unyon-distributed album Julie Doiron's Julie Doiron and the Wooden Stars scoring a Juno win.

=== The Distribution Era (1998-2008) ===
Following the collapse and eventual bankruptcy of Cargo Records, Sonic Unyon Distribution was founded in 1998 to distribute Sonic Unyon and other labels in Canada, amassing a roster that included dozens of domestic imprints as well as exclusively representing over 250 international independent labels within Canada. The company distributed releases in Canada from independent labels from around the world and issued select co-releases with other independent labels, including Amphetamine Reptile, Dischord Records, Epitaph Records, Fat Wreck Chords, Fearless, Jagjaguwar, Matador Records, Merge Records, Metalheadz, Nuclear Blast, Plexifilm, Secretly Canadian, Southern Records, Thrill Jockey, and Warp. Sonic Unyon Distribution was ultimately sold to MapleCore in 2008.

Sonic Unyon also ran hardcore label Goodfellow Records (active 1997-2009), as well as the more mainstream imprint Labwork Music (a joint effort with EMI Canada), which released Wintersleep's Welcome to the Night Sky, the album that earned them a Juno Award for New Group of the Year.

Operating out of a retail space on the main floor of Sonic Unyon’s headquarters, the Sonic Unyon Record Store showcased the thousands of independent titles stocked in the label’s distribution warehouse, located in the same building. The shop opened in October 1998 and remained in business for almost a decade, closing in spring of 2008. The label continues to operate an online storefront.

Complementing the building's basement hardcore shows and in-store pop-ups, between 2002 and 2007 the label’s third floor space hosted concerts from dozens of bands including Alexisonfire, Frank Black and the Catholics, Converge, Cursed, The Evens, and Voivod.

=== The Events Era (2009-present) ===
In 2009, Sonic Unyon returned to event production at scale by organizing Supercrawl, a free annual multi-arts festival dedicated to showcasing the arts scene in the James North region of Hamilton. The three-day event has featured hundreds of national and international touring artists in a range of artistic disciplines. In 2011, Supercrawl was formally reconfigured as the independent non-profit corporation Supercrawl Productions, which contracts Sonic Unyon to produce the annual festival as well as Supercrawl-presented events throughout the year. In 2015, the festival received an Ontario Tourism Award of Excellence for Tourism Event of the Year. It was also a finalist for Event of the Year at the 2017 Canadian Tourism Awards.

Sonic Unyon has since broadened its events-based business to include the annual Because Beer Craft Beer Festival, and the opening of multi-use cultural events spaces Mills Hardware and Bridgeworks in 2014 and 2020 respectively. The label left its Wilson Street offices in 2017 and is now headquartered within the Bridgeworks venue.

Sonic Unyon has produced Junofest 2015 and 2022, Juno Songwriters’ Circle in 2019, and Hamilton's 2015 Pan Am Games closing celebrations. Sonic Unyon also produced the 2021 and 2023 Grey Cup Festivals, the 2023 and 2024 Polaris Music Prize Galas and the 2023 edition of CBC Toronto's Sounds of the Season.

In 2011, roughly two decades after the term “metal” was stripped from the Juno Awards (following the retirement of the Best Hard Rock / Metal Album category after the 1991 awards), a new category was created: Metal/Hard Music Album of the Year, the result of a two-year CARAS lobbying campaign by Sonic Unyon.

In 2019, the label released a triple-LP vinyl retrospective, Now We Are 25, as well as a documentary of the same name that featured appearances from artists Joel Plaskett of Thrush Hermit, Hayden, Chris Murphy and Jay Ferguson of Sloan, Terra Lightfoot, music media personalities George Stromboulopoulos and Alan Cross, and others.

In 2024, the label announced a new event space called Sonic Hall in downtown Guelph, Ontario. In July 2025, the label purchased the Warehouse Concert Hall in St. Catharines, Ontario. That venue became the fourth event space in the Greater Golden Horseshoe booked and operated by Sonic Unyon.

In 2025, the label also launched SUM Artist Management, dedicated to representing and developing artists.

== Critical Recognition ==
Sonic Unyon’s roster makes up three of CBC's 50 best Canadian songs of the '90s and eight placements on Noisey’s 2016 ranking of the 60 Best CanRock Songs Ever. Singles from Sonic Unyon artists represent three of CBC Music’s 50 Best Canadian Songs of the '90s and three of Indie 88’s Top 150 Canadian Songs of All Time.

Two Sonic Unyon releases (Hayden's Everything I Long For and Sianspheric's Somnium) ranked on Chart Magazine’s Top 100 Greatest Canadian Albums of All Time. Thrush Hermit’s Clayton Park has been named as one of CBC Music’s 100 Greatest Canadian Albums Ever while Sianspheric’s Somnium was named as one of Chart Attack’s Top 50 Canadian Albums of All Time.

== Commercial Success ==
Hayden’s Everything I Long For has been certified Gold by Music Canada.

== Awards & Nominations ==
=== Juno Awards ===
- Julie Doiron, Julie Doiron and the Wooden Stars (Sappy/Sonic Unyon) - Winner, Best Alternative Album, 2000
- Thrush Hermit, Clayton Park (Sonic Unyon) - Nominee, Best Alternative Album, 2000
- Tricky Woo, Sometimes I Cry (Sonic Unyon) - Nominee, Best Alternative Album, 2000
- Terra Lightfoot, New Mistakes (Sonic Unyon) - Nominee, Adult Alternative Album of the Year, 2018
- Strongman, No Time Like Now (Sonic Unyon) - Nominee, Blues Album of the Year, 2018
- Danko Jones, Power Trio (Sonic Unyon) - Nominee, Metal/Hard Music Album of the Year, 2022
- Danko Jones, Electric Sounds (Sonic Unyon) - Nominee, Metal/Hard Music Album of the Year, 2024
- Big Wreck, Pages (Sonic Unyon) - Nominee, Rock Album of the Year, 2025
- Terra Lightfoot, Healing Power (Sonic Unyon) - Nominee, Adult Alternative Album of the Year, 2025

=== Polaris Music Prize ===
- Final Fantasy, He Poos Clouds (Blocks Recording Club/Sonic Unyon) - Winner, 2006
- Terra Lightfoot, New Mistakes (Sonic Unyon/Sony) - Long List, 2018
- Thrush Hermit, Clayton Park - Short List, Slaight Family Polaris Heritage Prize, 2020
- Terra Lightfoot, Healing Power (Sonic Unyon/Universal) - Long List, 2024

== Selected Artists ==
The following artists have made at least one release through Sonic Unyon.

- A Northern Chorus
- Ad Astra Per Aspera
- Aereogramme
- Augury
- Basement Revolver
- Bass Drum of Death
- Big Wreck
- Frank Black / Frank Black and the Catholics
- Camouflage Nights
- Change of Heart
- Chore
- Creep Division
- Crooked Fingers
- Damon & Naomi
- Danko Jones
- Dearly Beloved
- Angela Desveaux
- Dinner Belles
- The Dinner Is Ruined / The Dinner Is Ruined Band
- Dirtmitts
- Julie Doiron
- Elevator Through
- Eric's Trip
- Espanola
- André Ethier
- Exit Calm
- Evangeline Gentle
- The Ghost Is Dancing
- Gleet
- Golden Feather
- Golden Lake Diner
- Gorp
- Grand Duchy
- Grasshopper
- hHead
- Intronaut
- The Jesus Lizard
- Kestrels
- Kitchens & Bathrooms
- Kittens
- Jens Lekman
- Terra Lightfoot
- LTtheMonk
- Manishevitz
- Mares of Thrace
- Mayor McCA
- The Megaphonic Thrift
- The Mooney Suzuki
- Dale Morningstar
- Mystery Machine
- The Nein
- The New Grand
- Nightjacket
- Otis Haynes (Chris Murphy & Patrick Pentland)
- Paley & Francis (Reid Paley & Black Francis)
- Pixies
- Poledo
- The Primrods
- Rage
- Raising the Fawn
- Ringo Deathstarr
- Sacrifice
- Sectorseven
- Shallow North Dakota
- SIANspheric
- Simply Saucer
- Sinclaire
- Slabtown
- Sleeper Set Sail
- Slowcoaches
- Smoother
- Spirits
- Spitfire
- Strongman
- The Strumbellas
- Suicidal Angels
- Tangiers
- Teenage Head
- Thrush Hermit
- Toshack Highway
- Treble Charger
- Tricky Woo
- Trigger Happy
- Tristan Psionic
- Suzie Ungerleider
- Untimely Demise
- Vatican Chainsaw Massacre
- Voivod
- Sam Weber
- Wintersleep
- Wooden Stars
- WTCHS
- Young Rival
- Zeke

== See also ==
- Now We Are 5 (1998), Sonic Unyon's fifth anniversary compilation album
- Now We Are 25 (2018), Sonic Unyon's 25th anniversary compilation album
- Sonic Unyon: Now We Are 25 (2019), documentary film
- List of record labels
