= The New Grand =

Canadian indie rock band

- Origin: London, Ontario, Canada
- Genres: Indie rock
- Years active: 1995–2000, 2003
- Labels: Sonic Unyon
- Past members: Michael Clive; Malcolm Scott; T. D. Smith; Patrice Von Morgan

The New Grand were a Canadian indie rock band from London, Ontario. Known for their explosive live shows, they released two full-length albums on Sonic Unyon Records.

== History ==
Original members Michael P. Clive, Tim Smith, and Pat Morgan met in high school in the early 1990s. They were joined by guitarist Malcolm Scott in the fall of 1995 just prior to recording their first full-length album.

The New Grand, an album of energetic pop songs, was recorded with Brendan McGuire behind the board and released in 1996 on Sonic Unyon Records. The album was met with fair reviews and modest sales. Steady shows in Southwestern Ontario, industry shows in New York, Toronto, and Austin, and a cross-Canada tour with Treble Charger followed. A video for "The Get Up" received modest rotation on Much Music.

The New Grand released their second album on Sonic Unyon in 1998 entitled Incognito. Incognito was recorded in Calgary, Alberta, at Sundae Sound with Dave Alcock (Chixdiggit) producing. That year the band performed at the South by South West festival in Austin, Texas.

The band's track "Yours Truly", was included on Squirtgun Records' compilation album More Of Our Stupid Noise.

The New Grand disbanded in 2000 but reunited for a one-off show at Call the Office in October 2003 for a CHRW benefit concert.

== Discography ==
=== Albums ===
- 1996 The New Grand
- 1998 Incognito

== See also ==
- Music of Canada
- Canadian rock
- List of bands from Canada
