= Rick White (musician) =

Canadian musician and singer-songwriter (born 1970)

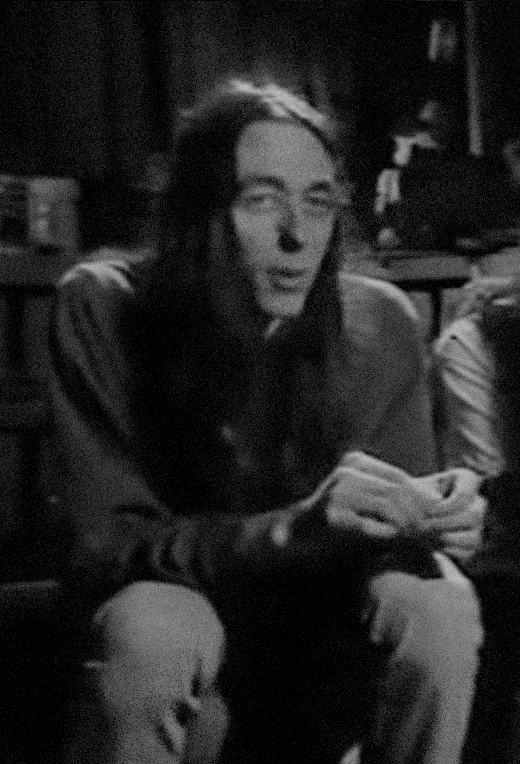
- Rick White on CBC's Ear to the Ground, June 1993

Background information
- Born: 5 December 1970 (age 55); Moncton, New Brunswick
- Genres: Indie rock, lo-fi
- Occupations: Musician, producer
- Instruments: Guitar, vocals, keyboards, drums, bass
- Years active: 1984–present
- Labels: Blue Fog, Great Beyond
- Formerly of: Eric's Trip, Elevator, Perplexus, The Unintended, The Underdogs, The Forest, T.C.I.B., Bloodstain
- Website: rickwhite.ca

Rick White (born 5 December 1970) is a Canadian musician and singer-songwriter. Born in Moncton, New Brunswick, he was a member of indie bands Eric's Trip, Elevator, Perplexus, and The Unintended. White first played music with a band called Bloodstain in 1984 before starting his own band in 1986 called T.C.I.B that later transitioned to the name The Underdogs, which lasted from the summer of 1987 until June 1988. By the summer of 1989, The Underdogs had broken up and Rick had joined another band, The Forest, which lasted from the 1989 until June 1990, with a one-off recording session happening in December, 1990. Prior to and during Eric's Trip, White also recorded two solo-produced albums, one in March 1990 and another in August 1991, but neither one was released until 2022. Known for lo-fi recording, he has also recorded and produced music for The Sadies, Orange Glass, Joel Plaskett, One Hundred Dollars, Dog Day, HotKid and his former Eric's Trip bandmate Julie Doiron.

White released his first solo album, The Rick White Album, in late 2005. He followed it with Memoreaper in 2007. White's next album, 137, is a double album which was released in 2009 on Blue Fog Recordings. He released a record in 2019, The Opening, and was recorded with Eiyn Sof. His latest release, with all original material, is AGAIN, which was released in June 2025.

White is the former roommate of Dallas Good, founding member of The Sadies. White lived with Good during the early 2000s after moving from Moncton to Toronto.

Following Good's death in 2022, White recorded a tribute album of Sadies covers, Rick White Plays the Sadies. In 2024 he collaborated with the remaining band members on Rick White and the Sadies, an album of new original material. The album was longlisted for the 2025 Polaris Music Prize.

== Discography ==
=== The Underdogs ===
- The Underdogs – (Compilation & live tracks, recorded Summer 1987–Jun. 1988) - Bandcamp, April 2020

=== The Forest ===
- The Forest – (Compilation, recorded Nov. 1989–Dec. 1990) - Bandcamp, Nov. 3, 2019.

=== Elevator ===
==== EPs ====
- Forward to Snow – 7-inch EP, Sappy Records, April 1995
- Backwards May – 7-inch EP, Sappy, September 1996
- Onwards and Away – 7-inch EP, Squirtgun, March 1997

==== Cassettes ====
- Elevator to Hell (demo) – cassette, September 1994
- Parts Four and Five – cassette, Astronavigation, September 1997; CDR, Great Beyond, December 2001
- Recorded Live in Halifax on 2 August 1997 – cassette, September 1997

==== Albums ====
- Elevator to Hell – LP, Sub Pop, February 1995
- Part 3 – mini-LP, Sub Pop, July 1996
- Parts 1–3 – CD, Sub Pop, August 1996
- Eerieconsiliation – CD/LP Sub Pop, August 1997
- Original Music from the Motion Picture The Such – CD, Murderecords, May 1998
- Vague Premonition – CD, Sub Pop, April 1999; LP, Sonic Unyon, June 1999
- Live in Concert 24 April 99 – LP, Great Beyond, June 1999
- A Taste of Complete Perspective – CD/LP, Teenage USA, September 2000
- Early Band Recordings: February 1995 – June 1997 – CDR, Great Beyond, December 2001
- Live in Concert 2001 – CDR, Great Beyond, December 2001
- Lost During Headquake – CDR, Great Beyond, December 2001
- 4D – CDR, Great Beyond, February 2002
- Darkness → Light – CD, Blue Fog, October 2002
- The Sightseer Project – CDR, Great Beyond, February 2003
- Parts Six and Seven – CDR, Great Beyond, Spring 2004
- Live in Toronto, 24 October 2003 – CDR, Great Beyond, Spring 2004
- August – CD, Blue Fog, 2005

==== Archival Releases ====
- LiveTaste (Oct.2000) (2012)
- The Headquake Tapes (2001) (2013)
- Vague Demos (1998) (2018)
- More Taste of Complete Perspective (1999–2000) (2019)
- August "Extra" (2004) (2020)
- August LP Demos (2003) (2023)

=== OLD ===
- OLD EP (Bluefog) - 2021
- OLD LP (Bluefog) - 2023

=== Solo/Rick White Album ===
- Live at the Paramount Lounge. 13 August 2003 (Great Beyond) – 2003
- The Rick White Album (Bluefog) – 2005
- Memoreaper LP (Bluefog) – 2007
- 137 LP (Bluefog) – 2009
- The Rick White Album Demos 2004 – 2013
- Tomorrow single (2018)
- The Opening LP w/ Eiyn Sof (Bluefog) – 2019
- Here We Are/ Urge For Going single w/ Eiyn Sof - 2020
- Rick covers Sloan's Peppermint EP - 2021
- Where It's Fine LP (Bluefog) – 2021
- 4 O'Clock In The Morning Sessions (March 1990) - (recorded March 1990) - March 4, 2022
- Pop Hits 91 (Aug. 1991) - (recorded Aug. 1991) - April 1, 2022
- Rick White plays The Sadies (2022)
- 20 Golden Hits of the 60's (2023
- 20 Golden Hits of the 80's (2023)
- De-Evolution EP (2023)
- Music Box (2023)
- 20 Golden Hits of the 70's (2024)
- 20 Golden Hits of the 50's (2024)
- 20 Golden Hits of the 90's (2024)
- AGAIN (June 2025)

=== Rick White and The Sadies ===
- Rick White and The Sadies (2024) (CD, 12" LP, Digital Download) (Bluefog)
- Live at the Great Hall (2024) (2xLP) (Bluefog)

== See also ==
- Music of Canada
- Canadian rock
- List of Canadian musicians
