= Dan Weston =

Canadian music producer and mixer

Dan Weston is a Canadian record producer, engineer, and mixer. He was born in Montreal. Weston has worked in a variety of musical genres, but is best known for his work with such artists as Juno award winner Shad, Classified, Daniel Romano, and Attack in Black.

== Discography ==
Year	Artist	Album	Label	Credit
2024	TWRP	Digital Nightmare		Mixer
2013	Shad	Flying Colours	Black Box	Mixer
2011	Classified	Handshakes and Middle Fingers	Sony BMG Canada	Mixer
2011	Shad & Dallas Green	2 Songs	Dine Alone	Engineer/Mixer
2011	Daniel Romano	Sleep Beneath the Willow	You've Changed	Mixer
2011	Northcote	Gather No Dust	Black Box	Producer/Mixer/Engineer
2011	Living With Lions	Holy Shit	Black Box (CAN)/Adeline (US)	Producer/Engineer/Mixer
2011	David Myles	"Simple Pleasures" (single)		Mixer
2011	Walter Schreifels	TBA		Mixer
2011	Kidz in the Hall	"Occasion" (single)	Duck Down	Mixer
2011	Lisa Scinta	Naked EP	Black Box	Mixer
2011	Kayo	One The Prequel EP	HalfLife	Mixer
2011	Hot Chelle Rae	Hot Chelle Rae Live	RCA	Mixer
2011	The Weather Station	All of it was Mine	You've Changed	Mixer
2010	Shad	TSOL	Black Box	Mixer
2010	Daniel Romano	Songs for Misha	You've Changed	Mixer
2010	Daniel Romano	Workin' for the Music Man	Dine Alone	Mixer
2010	Paper Lions	Trophies	Musebox	Producer/Engineer/Mixer
2009	Two Crown King	Is A Demo	Independent	Producer/Engineer
2009	Classified	Self Explanatory	Sony BMG Canada	Mixer
2009	Attack in Black	Years	Dine Alone	Mixer
2009	Ten Second Epic	Hometown	Black Box	Mixer
2008	The Reason	Acoustic EP	Warner Music Canada	Mixer
2008	Crash Parallel	World We Know	Sony BMG Canada	Producer/Engineer
2007	City and Colour	Borrowed Tunes II: A Tribute to Neil Young	Universal	Engineer/Mixer
2007	Attack in Black	Marriage	Dine Alone	Producer/Mixer/Engineer
2007	Ten Second Epic	"Old Habits Die Hard" (Single Remix)	Black Box	Mixer
2007	Cain and Abel	Up North	Sunday League	Producer/Engineer/Mixer
2006	Rosesdead	Stages	Black Box	Producer/Engineer/Mixer
