= Northcote (musician) =

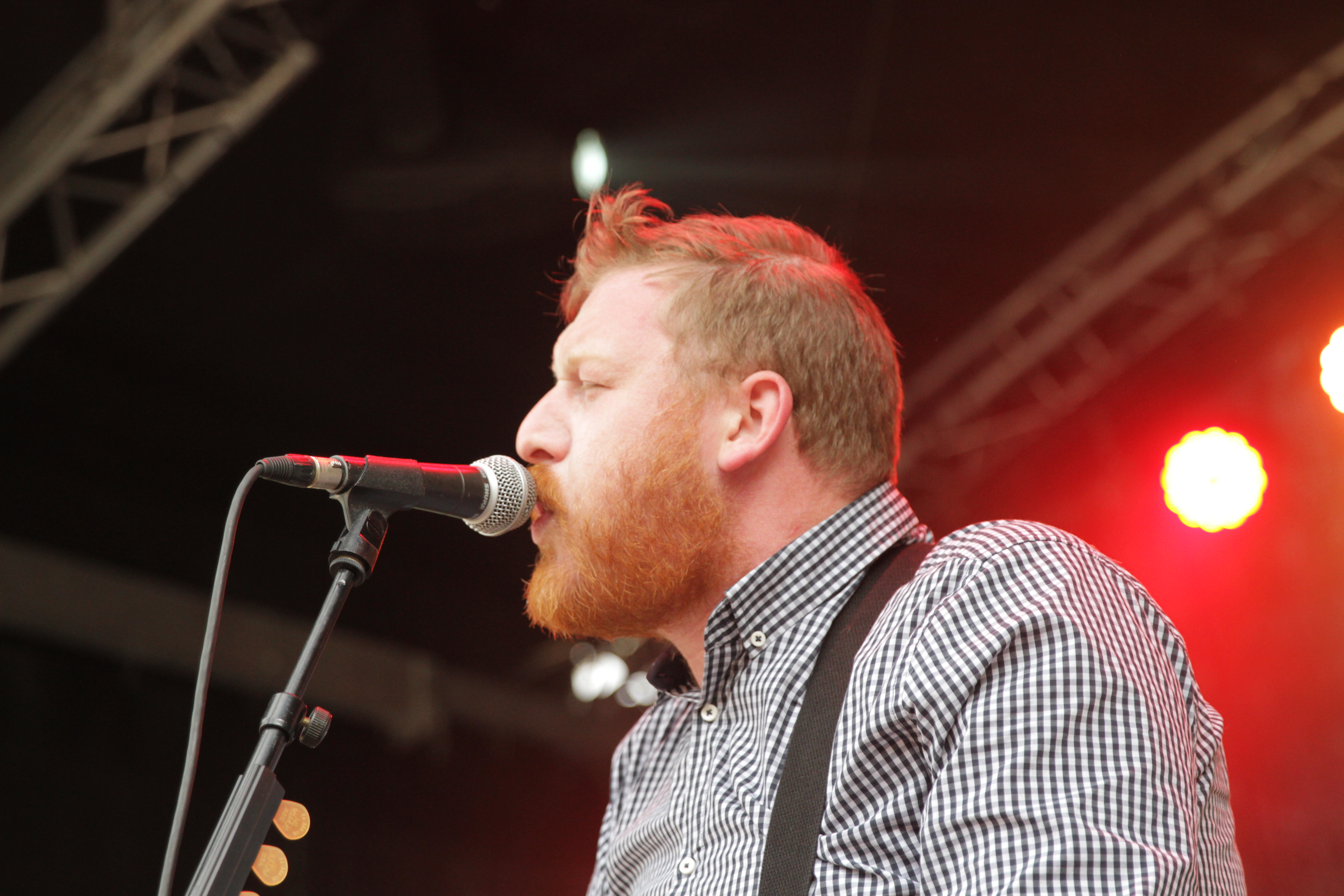
- Northcote at Rock Camp 2014, Germany

Background information
- Born: Matthew Daniel Goud; May 17, 1985 (age 41)
- Genres: Folk rock; punk rock; post-hardcore
- Years active: 2009–present
- Labels: The Black Numbers; Blackbox Music; Xtramile Records
- Website: Official website

Northcote, moniker of musician Matthew Daniel Goud (born May 17, 1985), is a Canadian singer, songwriter, and guitarist. His voice is described as similar to Bruce Springsteen, Joe Cocker, Peter Gabriel, as well as a more refined projection of his former hardcore roots. Northcote has shared the stage with Frank Turner, The Gaslight Anthem, Tim Barry, Wintersleep, Aidan Knight, Hannah Georgas, John K Samson (Weakerthans, Propaghandi), Corb Lund, The Wooden Sky, Library Voices, Lindi Ortega and others.

Northcote has released six studio albums to date. In 2009, shortly after signing to Blackbox Music, Northcote recorded his debut EP, “Borrowed Chords, Tired Eyes” in the back of a yoga studio in Regina, Saskatchewan. In 2011, Northcote went on to record his first full-length album, "Gather No Dust", at Jukasa Studios in Caledonia, Ontario. The album was co-produced by Dan Weston (Attack in Black, Shad, City and Color, Daniel Romano). In late 2012, Goud entered Hive Studios in Vancouver, British Columbia, to record the self-titled album, "Northcote", with Juno-winning producer, Colin Stewart (Dan Mangan, Yukon Blonde, Cave Singers, Black Mountain). The record was written in Goud’s van along the Victoria British Columbia waterfront. The album Hope Is Made of Steel was released in 2015. Let Me Roar was released in 2020.

== Early career (2000-2008) ==
Goud (pronounced “Good”) began his career as guitarist and second-vocalist of post-hardcore, Christian band, Means. Means was regarded as an important contributor to the Canadian underground post-hardcore scene. Touring extensively through Canada and the United States for 8 years, the group eventually signed to California-based record label, Facedown Records in 2006. Jason Dunn, founder of Facedown Records, explained his decision to sign the band was based on Goud’s “quality of the songwriting and the 'real' sounding vocals [sic] sung with passion." The group parted ways in 2008 following a cross-Canada farewell tour. Means shared the stage with such bands as Comeback Kid, Moneen, Shai Hulud, Misery Signals and As I Lay Dying. Between tours, Goud began performing acoustic-solo shows in smaller venues in his home province of Saskatchewan.

While Northcote acknowledges his conservative Christian roots, he is clear that he has distanced himself from organized religion. He shares candidly both on stage and in interviews about a time in his life when he believed his calling was ministry and how he eventually became a non-believer. What is less clear is how this transition has influenced his music. Northcote expressly distinguishes himself from such artists as David Bazan who have also walked away from religious piety but communicate this transition more overtly in their writing.

== Tours ==
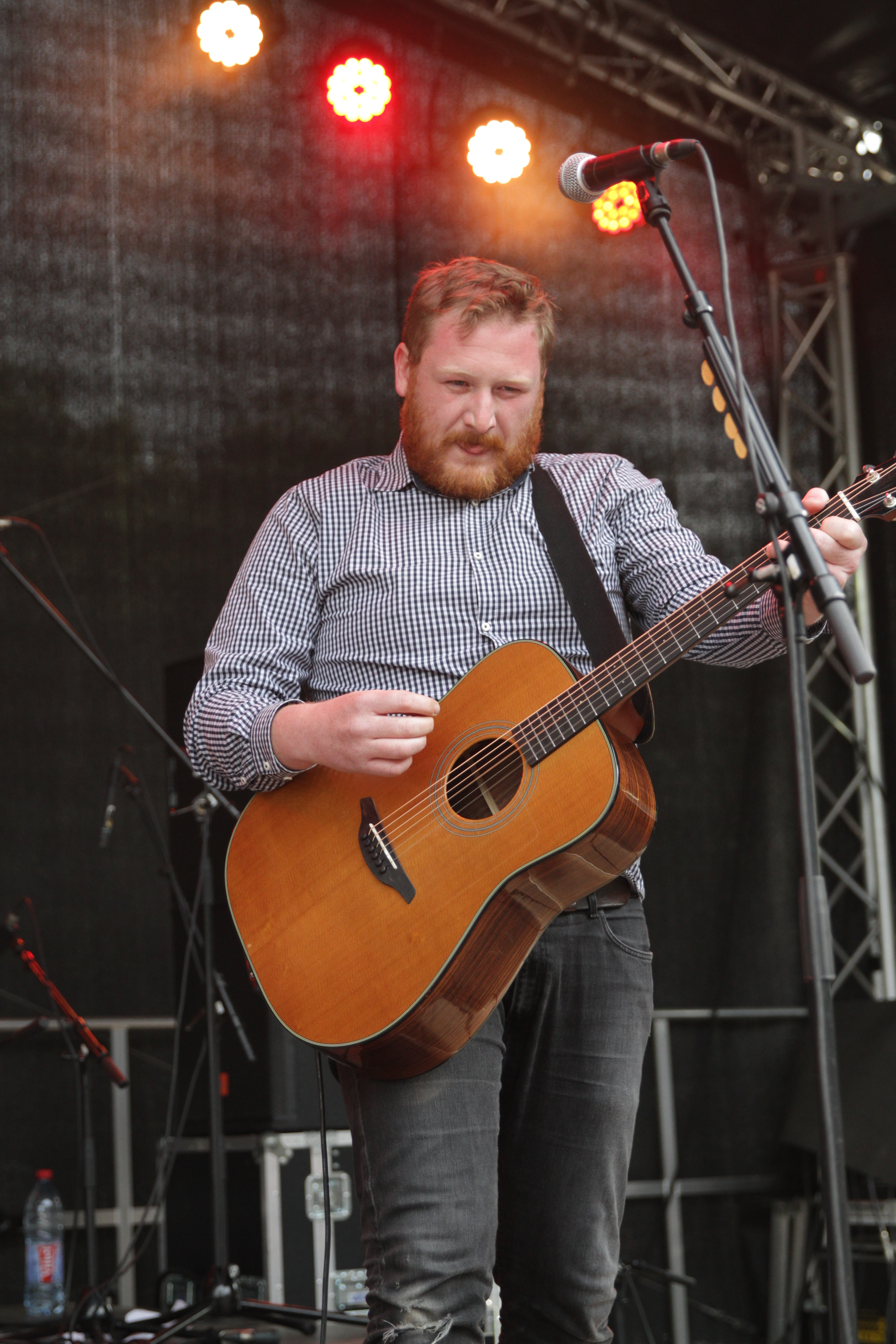
Northcote at Rock Camp 2014, Germany

=== Canada ===
In 2009, Northcote began touring extensively across Canada. Northcote performs in a variety of formats ranging from solo to full band, complete with a horn section. In May 2013, after the release of self-titled album, "Northcote", Goud headed out on a cross-country tour with a full band. Unfortunately, mid-way, the group suffered a car accident forcing them to cancel several shows. Northcote returned later in Summer 2013 to make up the remainder of most of the shows that were cancelled.

=== Europe ===
In 2013, Northcote signed with European-based record label, Xtra Mile Recordings. Since that time, Northcote continues to tour Europe with such artists as Dave Hause, Chuck Ragan and Billy The Kid. In May 2013, Northcote made his European debut in Germany with Nashville artists Austin Lucas, and Glossary. During this tour, he performed at the Pirate Satellite Festival in Stuttgart, Germany where he shared the stage with Turbonegro plus ...And You Will Know Us by the Trail of Dead.

In 2014, he had his first headlining tour through Europe. He played these concerts with the full band.

=== United States ===
In January 2014, Northcote made his American debut supporting Dave Hause on what has been his longest and most extensive tour to date. During this tour, "Northcote" was released digitally and on vinyl by the American record label, The Black Numbers (imprint of No Sleep Records) While on tour, Northcote appeared on Daytrotter, a website which hosts live, off-the-floor recording sessions of popular and up-and-coming indie artists.

=== Revival tour ===
In 2012, Northcote was invited by Chuck Ragan (of Hot Water Music) to play the Revival Tour in Montreal and Toronto. Prior to this, Northcote could frequently be heard covering "Trusty Chords" by Hot Water Music. Since that time, former lead-singer, Chuck Ragan, has been heard covering Northcote’s “Worry” alongside Dave Hause. Northcote contributed the track “Wildcard” to the Revival Tour- 2012 Collections. Coincidentally, Northcote is also known for covering Gaslight Anthem’s 59’ Sound. The band was quoted giving praise to "Burn Right Past them All" in an interview at the popular European Music Festival, Download.

== Musical projects ==
On November 19, 2013 Northcote released a self-titled, one-off project, called Teenland in collaboration with Leif Thorseth (Rah Rah), Graham Jones (Yukon Blonde) and Michael Dawson (Library Voices). The project was written and recorded over the span of two weekends. Teenland never toured and has no plans to do so.

=== Other projects ===
In 2014, Northcote released the first of a six-part live performance EPK series titled Lowville Sessions. The series was named after the town it was filmed in: Lowville, Ontario.

In December 2013, the magazine Vice released a digital-only selection of live recordings titled Live at the Upstairs Cabaret on their music channel, Noisey.

In February, 2013, Northcote released a subsequent web-series titled Painting an Album, which features interviews with Goud and various collaborators against the backdrop of the creation of a 12x12' mural replica of the album art for the newly released "Burn Right Past Them All"

In 2011, Northcote released a mini-documentary web-series titled Only You Can See Me, with the release of his first full-length record, "Gather No Dust". Released in four parts, the project includes music and interview footage coupled with downloadable tracks of acoustic takes of the album’s recordings.

In 2020 Northcote was selected alongside SonReal, JJ Wilde and The OBGMs as one of four musical acts to be promoted by Collective Arts Brewing's Audio/Visual Lager, which publicizes independent musicians with special limited edition band-themed cans.

== Discography ==
=== Studio albums ===
- 2009 Borrowed Chords, Tired Eyes (EP) – Blackbox Music
- 2011 Gather No Dust – Blackbox Music
- 2013 Self-Titled "Northcote" – Blackbox Music/ Xtra Mile Recordings / The Black Numbers
- 2015 Hope Is Made of Steel – Blackbox Music/ Xtra Mile Recordings / The Black Numbers
- 2020 Let Me Roar – Blackbox Music
- 2023 Wholeheart – Blackbox Music / The Hive
- 2026 To Cherish

=== Collaborations ===
- 2012 Revival Tour 2012 Collections - Ten Four Records
- 2013 Teenland - Self-released

=== Singles ===
- 2013 Digital and 7″ “Burn Right Past Them All” - Blackbox Music

=== Awards ===
Northcote's Self-Titled "Northcote" has been nominated for Western Canadian Music Awards Independent Album of the Year 2014.
