= Make Your Mark (disambiguation) =

Make Your Mark is an album by Living with Lions.

Make Your Mark may also refer to:

- Make Your Mark (Seth Lakeman album)
- Make Your Mark: Ultimate Playlist
- "Make Your Mark" (America's Next Top Model)
- Make Your Mark (The Price Is Right)
- "Chapter One: Make Your Mark"
- My Little Pony: Make Your Mark
