= Dude Manor =

EP by Living with Lions
- Released: September 18, 2007
- Genre: Pop punk
- Length: 21:56
- Label: Adeline, Black Box
- Producer: Stu McKillop

Living with Lions chronology
Dude Manor (2007)	Make Your Mark (2008)

Professional ratings
Review scores
Source	Rating
PunkNews	3.5/5 stars

Dude Manor is the first EP by Canadian pop punk band Living with Lions.

It was recorded and produced by Stu McKillop of Daggermouth and was released on September 18, 2007 on Black Box Music. The album was re-released in 10" vinyl format in 2009, after the band signed to American label Adeline Records.

A music video was made for the song "Later is Better" in 2010, directed by Cody Fennell.

== Track listing ==
1. "Intro"
2. "Later is Better"
3. "Colors"
4. "Mark Has Bedroom Eyes"
5. "Said and Done"
6. "A Noisy Noise Annoys the Boys"
7. "To All My" (bonus track)
