= Young Beauties and Fools =

Studio album by the Glorious Sons
- Released: October 13, 2017
- Recorded: February–March 2017
- Studio: Catherine North Studio, Hamilton, Ontario
- Genre: Alternative rock, hard rock, Southern rock, heartland rock
- Length: 32:29
- Label: Black Box
- Producer: Fast Friends

The Glorious Sons chronology
The Union (2014)	Young Beauties and Fools (2017)	A War on Everything (2019)

Singles from Young Beauties and Fools
- 1. "Everything Is Alright" Released: 2017; 2. "Josie" Released: 2018; 3. "S.O.S. (Sawed Off Shotgun)" Released: 2018

Young Beauties and Fools is the second album by Canadian rock band the Glorious Sons. Released on October 13, 2017, Young Beauties and Fools contains the singles "S.O.S. (Sawed Off Shotgun)", "Everything Is Alright" and "Josie". "Everything Is Alright" peaked at #1 on the Canadian Alternative rock radio charts, and saw airplay internationally including being championed by DJ Daniel P. Carter on BBC Radio 1 in the UK. "Everything Is Alright" was named the #3 song of 2017 by Edge 102.1 and the #28 song of 2017 by Indie 88.

The album was written in under two weeks. Music Existence called it "a tightly produced, unapologetically fun record" which "provides a genuine, unpretentious look into the emotional volatility of youth." The Soundboard Reviews called Young Beauties and Fools "an album that’s perfectly listenable and, for the most part, likable, but would be an absolute nightmare to dissect in depth, simply because there’s so little there." The Spill Magazine praised the album as "relatable and catchy", "an easy listen with a whole lot of heart."

At the Juno Awards of 2018, Young Beauties and Fools won the Juno Award for Rock Album of the Year.

== Track listing ==
All tracks are written by Brett Emmons, Jay Emmons, Christopher Koster, Christopher Huot, Adam Paquette, Tom Peyton, Ryan Spraker, and Frederik Thaae.

No.	Title	Length
1.	"My Poor Heart"	3:10
2.	"Josie"	3:40
3.	"Everything Is Alright"	3:13
4.	"Come Down"	3:30
5.	"Hide My Love"	2:57
6.	"Godless, Graceless and Young"	3:12
7.	"My Blood"	2:47
8.	"Sawed Off Shotgun"	3:15
9.	"So Much Love to Give"	3:12
10.	"Thank You for Saying Goodbye"	3:33
Total length:		32:29

== Personnel ==
Credits adapted from Tidal.

=== The Glorious Sons ===
- Brett Emmons – vocals, keyboards
- Jay Emmons – guitar
- Chris Koster – guitar
- Chris Huot – bass
- Adam Paquette – drums

=== Technical ===
- Fast Friends – production
- Matty Green – mixing
- Harry Hess – mastering

== Charts ==
Chart (2017)	Peak position
Canadian Albums (Billboard)	16

== Certifications ==
Region	Certification	Certified units/sales
Canada (Music Canada)	Platinum	80,000^{‡}
^{‡} Sales+streaming figures based on certification alone.
