= JJ Wilde =

Canadian rock singer (born 1992)

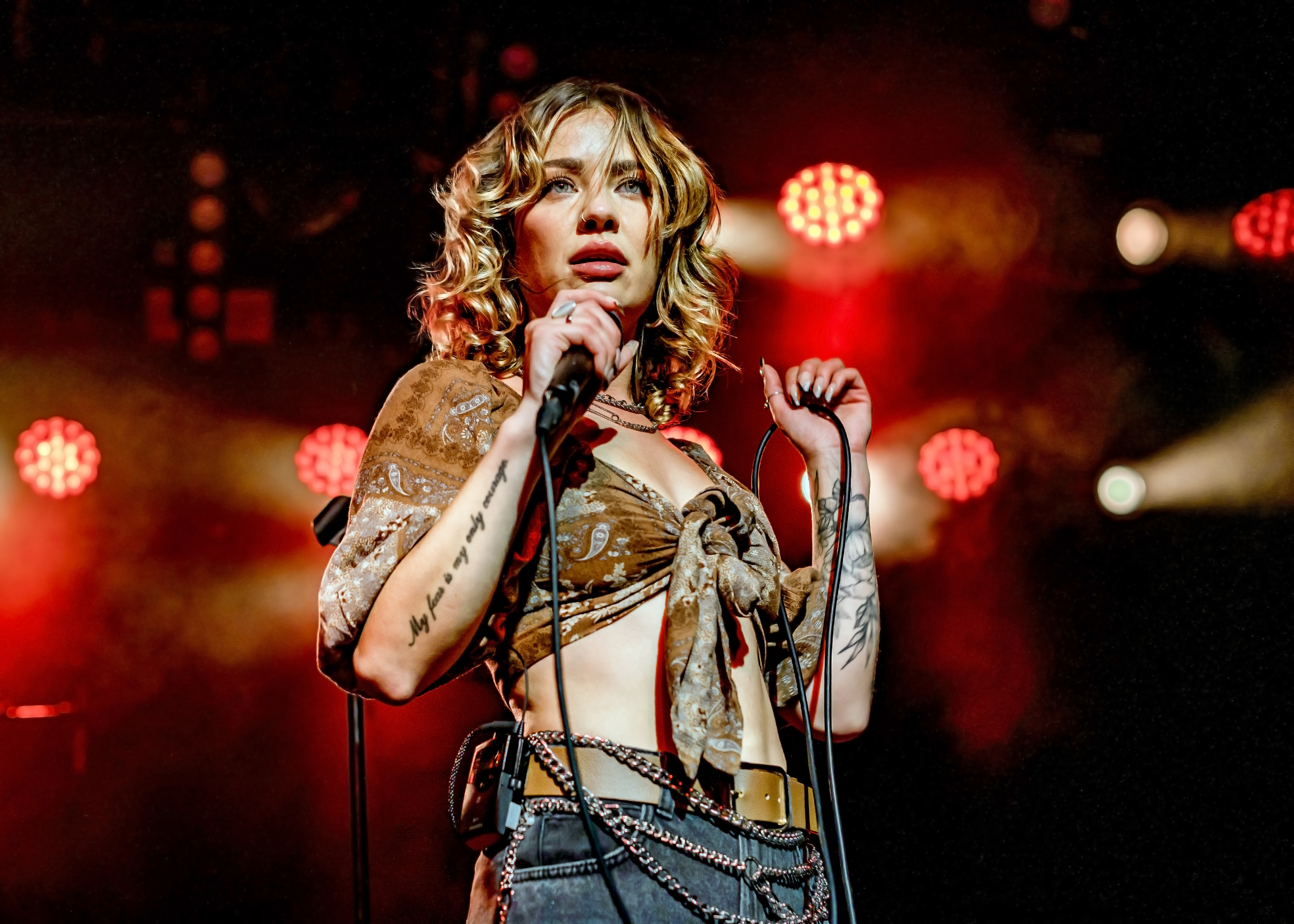
- JJ Wilde performing in 2021

Background information
- Born: July 3, 1992 (age 34)
- Origin: Kitchener, Ontario, Canada
- Label: Black Box
- Website: jjwilde.com

Jillian Dowding (born July 3, 1992), known professionally as JJ Wilde, is a Canadian rock singer from Kitchener, Ontario. She released her debut EP, Wilde Eyes, Steady Hands, in 2019. Her first single, "The Rush", simultaneously reached number 1 on Canada's modern rock, active rock, and mainstream rock charts in May 2020, only one of eleven songs to accomplish the feat. She followed up with the full-length album Ruthless in 2020. It won Rock Album of the Year at the 2021 Juno Awards, making JJ Wilde the first woman to win the award in 25 years, since Alanis Morissette in 1996.

In 2020, JJ Wilde was selected alongside SonReal, the OBGMs, and Northcote as one of four musical acts to be promoted by Collective Arts Brewing's Audio/Visual Lager, which publicizes independent musicians with special limited-edition, band-themed cans.

In 2021, she released the EP Wilde, followed up by a collaborative EP with Billy Raffoul, titled Born to Die. In 2024, she published her second full-length album, Vices.

== Discography ==
Studio albums

- Ruthless (2020)
- Vices (2024)

EPs

- Wilde Eyes, Steady Hands (2019)
- Wilde (2021)
- Born to Die with Billy Raffoul (2021)
- Best of Me (Pt. 1) (2024)
