= Curve of the Earth =

Curve of the Earth may refer to:

- Curve of the Earth (album), a 2016 album by Mystery Jets
- The Curve of the Earth, a 2007 album by Attack in Black
- Figure of the Earth, the shape of the planet
