= Teenage Kicks (disambiguation) =

"Teenage Kicks" was a 1978 pop punk single by The Undertones.

Teenage Kicks may also refer to:

- Teenage Kicks (TV series), a 2008 British sitcom
- Teenage Kicks (band), a Canadian alternative rock band, active from 2010
- Teenage Kicks (film), a 2016 Australian drama film directed by Craig Boreham
- "Teenage Kicks" (Doctors), a 2003 television episode
- "One Way or Another (Teenage Kicks)", a 2013 One Direction song for Comic Relief
