= The Glorious Sons =

Canadian rock band

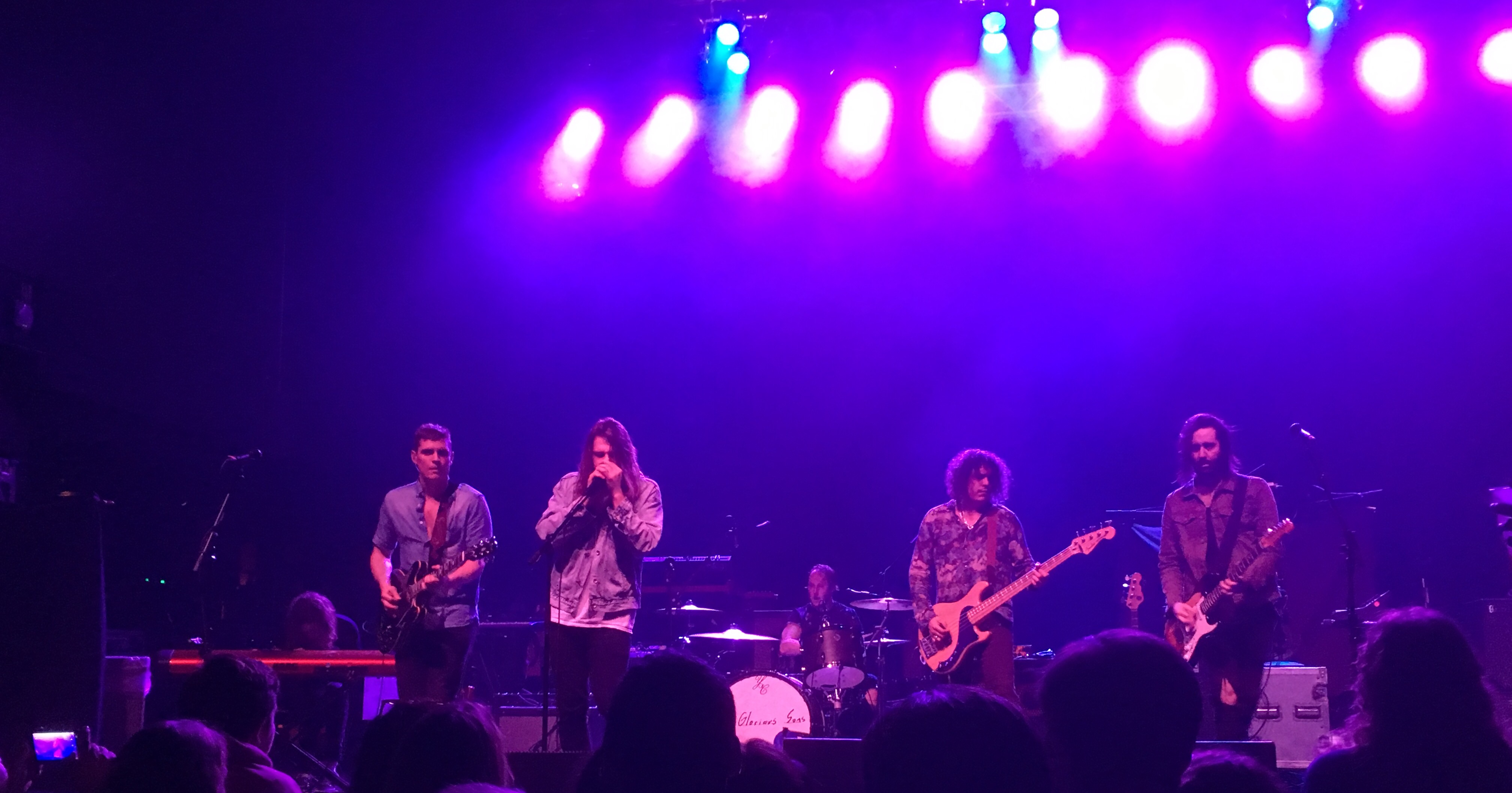
- The Glorious Sons performing live in 2018

Background information
- Origin: Kingston, Ontario, Canada
- Genres: Alternative rock, hard rock, Southern rock, heartland rock
- Years active: 2011–present
- Labels: Black Box Music (Canada); BMG Rights Management (US & Australia); Earache Records (Europe & Japan)
- Members: Brett Emmons; Jay Emmons; Adam Paquette; Josh Hewson; Peter Van Helvoort; Steve Kirstein
- Past members: Andrew Young; Chris Huot; Chris Koster
- Website: theglorioussons.com

The Glorious Sons are a Canadian rock band from Kingston, Ontario. Formed in 2011, the band signed with Black Box in 2013. Since then, The Glorious Sons have released two EPs and four full-length albums.

== History ==
=== 2011–2013: Formation, Shapeless Art ===
The Glorious Sons were founded as a five-piece in 2011 and issued their first EP, Shapeless Art independently in 2013 featuring their first radio single, "Mama" which reached #6 on the Canadian rock radio charts. Shapeless Art was produced by John-Angus MacDonald and mixed by Gordie Johnson. The band signed to the eclectic Canadian label Black Box Music later that year, and re-released the EP alongside the single "White Noise" which reached #2 on the Canadian rock radio charts. The band toured nationally to support the EP, including dates with Head of the Herd, The Balconies, Teenage Kicks and more.

=== 2014–2016: The Union and "Sometimes on a Sunday" ===
Between tours in March 2014, the group then began recording their debut full-length, The Union at Catherine North Studio in Hamilton, Ontario, with producer John-Angus MacDonald of The Trews. The album was completed in June 2014, including remixed versions of the tracks "Mama" and "White Noise" from the Shapeless Art EP, and two tracks added later that summer; the singles "Heavy" and "Lightning" produced by Gavin Brown. The album was released on September 14, 2014, with "Heavy" as the lead single, which reached #3 on the Canadian rock radio charts. The album produced the subsequent singles "Lightning" and "The Contender" which reached #2 and #1 respectively on the Canadian rock radio charts.

To support the release of The Union, the group toured Canada supporting Airbourne and The Trews. They also toured the United States with 10 Years and performed at festivals such as Rock on the Range, Rocklahoma, Northern Invasion, Carolina Rebellion and more in 2016.

The Union was nominated for a Juno Award for Best Rock Album, and The Glorious Sons were nominated and won "Group of the Year" and "Rock Group of the Year" at the SiriusXM Indie Awards at Canadian Music Week in 2015.

In October 2015, the band released the self-produced stand-alone single, "Sometimes on a Sunday". The song was produced at North of Princess Studio in Kingston, Ontario. It was released digitally on October 30, 2015, and saw a physical release as the B-side of the "Kill the Lights/Sometimes on a Sunday" limited-edition 7" released in November 2017.

=== 2017–2018: "Kill the Lights" and Young Beauties and Fools ===
On January 27, 2017, they released their stand-alone single, "Kill the Lights". The track was produced by Jason Murray and the band at Metalworks Studios in Mississauga, Ontario in August 2016. The music video for the song was shot in Toronto, Ontario, in December 2016, with the live performance scenes shot at Sneaky Dee's. The song peaked at #2 on the Canadian rock radio charts following its release. Though initially only released digitally, the track was included as the a-side of the Kill The Lights/Sometimes on a Sunday limited-edition 7" released in November 2017.

The band began recording their second full-length album, Young Beauties and Fools in Los Angeles in February and March 2017 with producer group Fast Friends. The album was mixed in July 2017 by Matty Green, and the lead single "Everything Is Alright" was released on July 21, 2017. Following the release of the single, the band signed international label deals with Earache Records in the UK, Europe and Japan, and with BMG Rights Management in the United States and Australia to release the new album.

Young Beauties and Fools was released on October 13, 2017. The band supported the album release by joining rock group, Greta Van Fleet, as support on select dates of their American Tour (between August and November 2017). "Everything Is Alright" peaked at #1 on the Canadian Alternative rock radio charts, and see airplay internationally including BBC Radio 1 championed by Daniel P. Carter. "Everything Is Alright" was named as Edge 102.1's #3 song of 2017, and Indie 88's #28 song of 2017.

At the Juno Awards of 2018, Young Beauties and Fools won the Juno Award for Rock Album of the Year.

=== 2019–2023: A War on Everything ===
On June 5, 2019, they released the first single from their third album A War on Everything, entitled "Panic Attack". To promote the album, the band announced a US tour with British rock band The Struts that took place over the summer of 2019. On July 17, 2019, the title, cover, and tracklist of A War on Everything was unveiled, alongside a release date of September 13, 2019. On this date, the band also released the song "Pink Motel" from the album. On August 16, 2019, the band released a third song from the album in anticipation of its release, "The Ongoing Speculation Into The Death of Rock and Roll".

Following the release of A War on Everything, the band announced a headlining North American tour on September 23, 2019. The tour would feature guests Des Rocs on American dates and Black Pistol Fire on Canadian dates.

On May 18, 2021, the band released a new single called "Daylight".

On August 29, 2023, the band announced the departure of Chris Koster on social media.

=== 2023–present: Glory ===
On September 6, 2023, the band released their fourth studio album, Glory. The album was supported by the singles "Mercy Mercy" and "Lightning Bolt". They toured in support of the album between September 2023–February 2024.

== Band members ==
=== Current ===
- Brett Emmons – vocals, guitar, harmonica, keys
- Jay Emmons – guitar, vocals
- Adam Paquette – drums, vocals
- Josh Hewson – piano, guitar
- Peter Van Helvoort - bass guitar, vocals
- Steve Kirstein - guitar, vocals

=== Former ===
- Chris Koster – guitar, vocals (2015–2023)
- Andrew Young – guitar, vocals (2011–2015)
- Chris Huot - bass

=== Touring ===
- Tony Silvestri – piano, acoustic guitar (2015–2016)

== Discography ==
=== Studio albums ===
Release title	Release date	Label(s)	CAN peak	Certifications
The Union	September 14, 2014	Black Box	23	MC: Gold
Young Beauties and Fools	October 13, 2017	Black Box (CA), Earache Records (EU, JP), BMG (US, AU)	16	MC: Platinum
A War on Everything	September 13, 2019	Black Box (CA), Earache Records (EU, JP), BMG (US, AU)	13	MC: Gold
Glory	September 6, 2023	TGS Records		

=== Live albums ===
Release title	Release date	Label
Little Prison City (Live at Rogers K-Rock Centre)	July 25, 2018	Black Box
Live at Longboat Hall	March 1, 2019	Black Box

=== EPs ===
Release title	Release date	Label
Shapeless Art	November 13, 2013	Black Box
The Young King Sessions	January 26, 2022	Black Box

=== Singles ===
Year	Title	Peak chart positions					Certifications	Album
Year	Title	CAN Rock	US Rock Air.	US Alt.	US Main.	US Rock	Certifications	Album
2013	"Mama"	11	—	—	—	—		Shapeless Art
2014	"White Noise"	3	—	—	—	—	MC: Gold	The Union
2014	"Heavy"	5	—	—	—	—	MC: Platinum	The Union
2015	"Lightning"	5	—	—	—	—	MC: Gold	The Union
2015	"The Contender"	6	—	—	—	—		The Union
2016	"Sometimes On a Sunday"	18	—	—	—	—		Non-album single
2017	"Kill the Lights"	3	—	—	—	—	MC: Platinum	Non-album single
2017	"My Poor Heart"	—	—	—	—	—	MC: Gold	Young Beauties and Fools
2017	"Everything Is Alright"	1	46	32	—	—	MC: 2× Platinum	Young Beauties and Fools
2018	"Josie"	2	—	—	—	—	MC: Gold	Young Beauties and Fools
2018	"S.O.S. (Sawed Off Shotgun)"	1	6	24	1	9	MC: 2× Platinum	Young Beauties and Fools
2019	"Panic Attack"	1	13	36	1	28	MC: Gold	A War on Everything
2019	"Pink Motel"	24	—	—	—	—		A War on Everything
2019	"Kingdom in My Heart"	2	—	—	—	—	MC: Gold	A War on Everything
2020	"Closer to the Sky"	6	42	—	19	—	MC: Gold	A War on Everything
2021	"Daylight"	37	—	—	—	—		The Young King Sessions
2021	"Young King"	–	—	—	—	—		The Young King Sessions
2021	"I Will Destroy the Void In You"	–	—	—	—	—		The Young King Sessions
2021	"Hold Steady"	1	—	—	—	—		The Young King Sessions
2023	"Mercy Mercy"	3	—	—	—	—		Glory
2023	"Lightning Bolt"	–	—	—	—	—		Glory
2023	"Dream"	–	—	—	—	—		Glory

=== Music videos ===
Year	Song	Director(s)	Ref.
2013	"Mama"	Steve Townsend	
2014	"White Noise"	Harv	
2014	"Heavy"	Tim Martin	
2015	"Lightning"	Harv	
2016	"Sometimes On A Sunday"	Dane Collison	
2017	"Kill The Lights"	Dane Collison	
2017	"Everything Is Alright"	Colin G. Cooper	
2019	"S.O.S. (Sawed Off Shotgun)"	Gavin Smith, Issa Shah	
2019	"Panic Attack"	Brume	
2019	"A War On Everything"	Matthew Kalinauskas	
2020	"Don't Live Fast"	Gavin Smith	
2023	"Mercy Mercy"	Matt Barnes	
2023	"Dream"	Matt Barnes	

Non-album singles

== Awards and nominations ==
- 2015 Juno Awards - Rock Album of the Year (Nominee)
- 2015 SiriusXM Indie Awards - Group of the Year (Winner)
- 2015 SiriusXM Indie Awards - Artist of the Year (Winner)
- 2018 Juno Awards - Rock Album of the Year (Winner)
- 2020 Juno Awards - Rock Album of the Year (Winner)
