= The Virtual EP =

EP from Ten Second Epic

EP by Ten Second Epic
- Released: October 14, 2008
- Recorded: 2008
- Genre: Alternative Rock; Emo
- Length: 14:45
- Label: Black Box Recordings

Ten Second Epic chronology
Count Yourself In (2006)	The Virtual EP (2008)	Hometown (2009)

Singles from The Virtual EP
- 1. "Life Times" Released: November 10, 2008

The Virtual EP is an EP from Ten Second Epic. It was released October 14, 2008 on Black Box Recordings. It is only available for download on the iTunes Store. The songs "Life Times" and "Yours to Lose" were later released on Hometown. This EP also features new versions of two songs from their previous album Count Yourself In.

== Track listing ==
No.	Title	Length
1.	"Life Times"	3:04
2.	"Yours to Lose"	3:16
3.	"Suck It Up Princess" (Jazz Redux)	4:53
4.	"Boys Will Be Boys" (Campfire Redux)	3:32
