= The OBGMs =

Canadian punk rock band

- Origin: Toronto, Ontario, Canada
- Genre: Punk rock
- Years active: 2007–present
- Label: Burn Industry
- Members: Densil McFarlane; Colanthony Humphrey; Joe Brosnan; Simon Outhit
- Past members: Jemuel Roberts
- Website: theobgms.com

The OBGMs (The oOohh Baby Gimme Mores) are a Canadian punk rock band from Toronto, Ontario. They are most noted for their 2020 album The Ends, which was a shortlisted finalist for the 2021 Polaris Music Prize.

The band consists of vocalist Densil McFarlane, guitarist Simon Outhit, bassist Joe Brosnan and drummer Colanthony Humphrey. Keyboardist Jemuel Roberts was also a member of the band in the mid-2010s, but is no longer with the band.

== History ==
The band was formed in 2007, initially as a hip hop production duo consisting of McFarlane and Humphrey. Their music became more punk-oriented after they were arrested in a racial profiling incident, which interfered with McFarlane's plans to attend university in the United States. They released their debut EP, Interchorus, in 2009.

Because McFarlane and Humphrey are Black Canadians, in their early years the band was often booked on urban music bills, and struggled to break through in the punk scene. This began to change in 2014 after the band was selected for a Budweiser ad campaign, in which they were told that they were being interviewed for a documentary film on undiscovered independent bands, but when they arrived at the interview venue they were in fact immediately offered the opportunity to play a show for a packed house comprising the largest audience they had ever performed for to that point. They subsequently performed at Budweiser's Made in America Festival, and at the New York City Afropunk Festival. They released their self-titled full-length debut album that year.

The Ends, produced by Dave Schiffman and recorded at Dreamhouse Studios in Toronto, was released on October 30, 2020. Around the same time, they were selected alongside JJ Wilde, SonReal and Northcote as one of four musical acts to be promoted by Collective Arts Brewing's Audio/Visual Lager, which helps to promote independent musicians with special limited edition band-themed cans.

In March 2021, the band also launched the Band Practice podcast.

Humphrey is the older brother of rapper Clairmont the Second.

Their third studio album, Sorry, It's Over, was shortlisted for the 2025 Polaris Music Prize, and was shortlisted for the Juno Award for Alternative Album of the Year at the Juno Awards of 2026.

== Discography ==
Studio albums:

- The OBGMs (2017)
- The Ends (2020)
- Sorry, It's Over (2024)

EPs:

- Interchorus (2009)
