= Make Your Mark =

Studio album by Living with Lions
- Released: June 17, 2008
- Recorded: at Metalworks Studios in Mississauga, Ontario
- Genre: Pop punk
- Length: 33:28
- Labels: Black Box, Adeline
- Producer: Jesse Smith

Living with Lions chronology
Dude Manor (2007)	Make Your Mark (2008)	Holy Shit (2011)

Professional ratings
Review scores
Source	Rating
Absolute Punk	(4.2/5)

Make Your Mark is the first full-length studio album by Canadian pop punk band Living with Lions, released on September 17, 2008.

The album was recorded and produced by Jesse Smith and mastered by Nick Blagona. It was originally released on Black Box Music in 2008, but was re-released in 12" vinyl format in 2009 on American label Adeline Records.

A music video was made for the song "A Bottle of Charades".

== Track listing ==
1. "She's a Hack"
2. "Wrong Place, Right Time"
3. "A Bottle of Charades"
4. "Granny Steps"
5. "My Dilemma"
6. "Cold Coffee"
7. "Hotel: Part Seven"
8. "Coolin' with Costa"
9. "Park It Out Back"
10. "Dude Manor (R.I.P.)"
11. "Outro"
