= Lakeport Brewing Company =

Brewery in Hamilton, Ontario, Canada

Lakeport Breweries
- Industry: Alcoholic beverage
- Founded: 1992
- Headquarters: Hamilton, Ontario, Canada
- Products: Beer
- Owner: Anheuser–Busch InBev

The Lakeport Brewing Company was a brewery located in Hamilton, Ontario, Canada. Although it started as a producer of premium beers, it later switched to cheap discount brands, using a strategy of selling its beer for "a buck a bottle". By 2006, it had become the largest discount brewer in Canada. In 2007, Lakeport was taken over by InBev's Canadian subsidiary, Labatt. Three years later, InBev closed the Hamilton brewing plant, and shifted production of Lakeport beers to the Labatt plant in London, Ontario.

== History ==
Lakeport was founded by William (Bill) Sharpe in 1992 as a premium beer brewery. The brewery was located in a historical brewery building on Hamilton's port lands owned by the Hamilton Port Authority. Sharpe created and launched many new brands of premium beer, as well as negotiating contracts to brew beers for other brands such as President's Choice.

However, the premium beers did not sell well; by 1999, Lakeport was in bankruptcy protection. AlphaCorp Holdings Ltd subsequently bought the brewery and hired Teresa Cascioli to manage it. To make the brewery profitable, Cascioli took on contract manufacturing work for other beverage brands and reworked the brewery operations.

=== Twenty-four for twenty-four ===
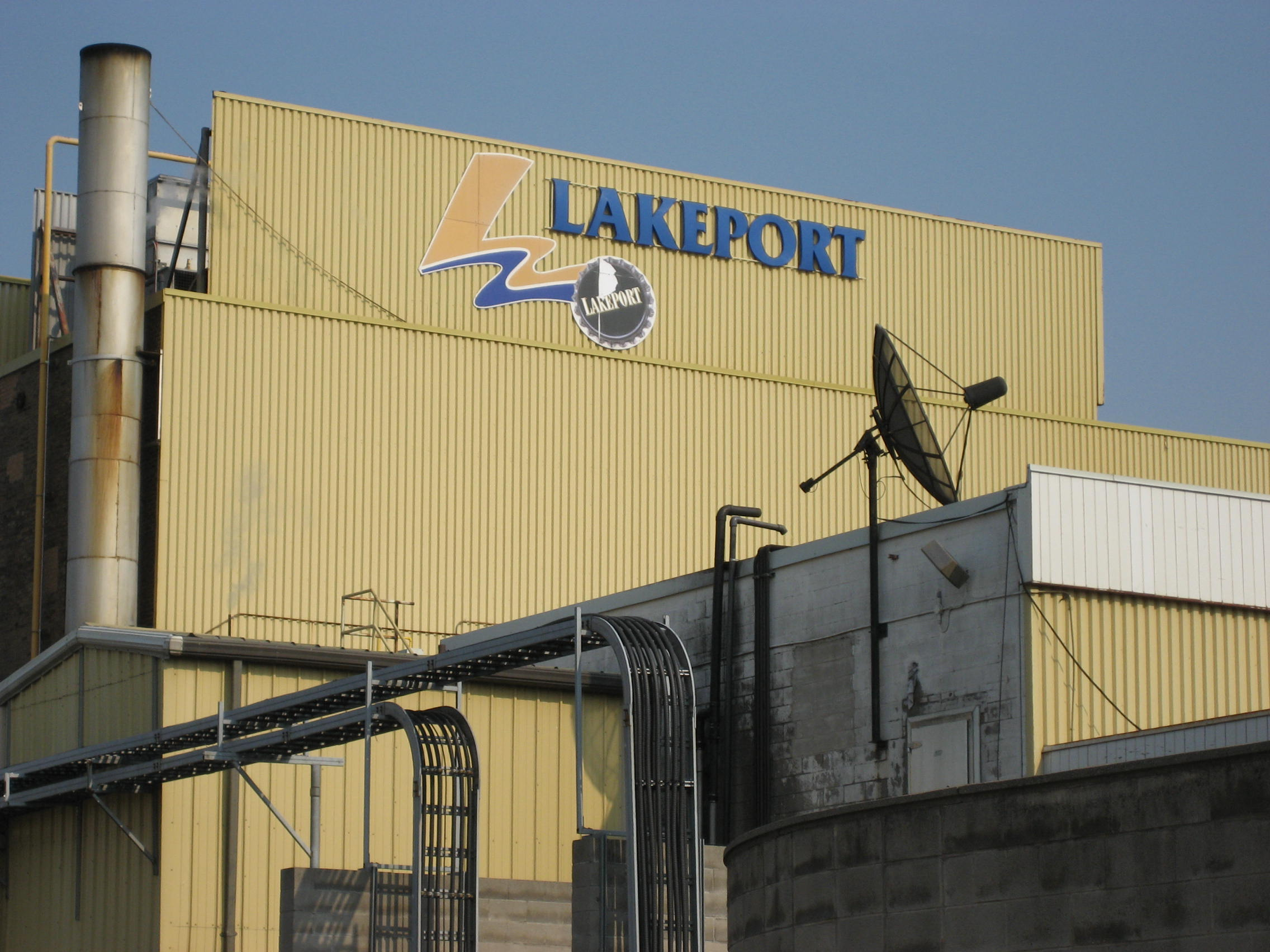
The Lakeport Brewery

In 2002 Lakeport held only one percent of the market share in Ontario when it pioneered a retail strategy of selling 24 beers for $24, at the time the lowest legal price in Ontario. Lakeport used its low prices as the basis for its marketing and immediately began to improve its market share.

Teresa Cascioli ascribed the success to Lakeport's willingness to take ownership of their discount beers, stating that "We are the only one at $24 plus deposit that actually puts our company name on it."

One television advertisement featured Teresa Cascioli and a shop steward of the Teamsters Local 938, representing the workers who brewed Lakeport, discussing how they hoped to make a good product at a reasonable price for their consumers. This "grassroots marketing approach" that focussed on the overall brewery rather than any individual brand was quite different from most beer marketing strategies of the time.

The result was that Lakeport's share of the Ontario beer market rose from less than 2% in 2003 to 11% in 2006. During this time, Lakeport beers were among the ten top selling beers in Ontario.

Cascioli had bought out the other investors to gain full ownership of the brewery. When Lakeport was incorporated on April 27, 2005, Cascioli became CEO. However, her ownership was reduced to about 20%.

=== Takeover ===
On February 1, 2007 Labatt Brewery, owned by InBev, made an offer of CAD$201.4 million to purchase Lakeport. Cascioli, as the largest shareholder, stood to gain more than CAD$40 million, and she and the board of directors recommended the sale to Lakeport shareholders. The deal was subsequently approved.

Just over three years later, on March 30, 2010, Labatt announced that in four weeks, the Lakeport Hamilton Brewery would close on April 30, 2010. All 143 brewery employees would be laid off and production of Lakeport beers would shift to the Labatt brewery in London, Ontario. In reaction, the Teamsters Union Local 938 called on Hamilton to boycott Labatt products.

Several offers to purchase the facilities and equipment surfaced, including one from Calgary-based Minhas Creek Brewing Company. InBev declined all offers, and completely gutted the building of all brewing equipment and infrastructure.

== Present Day ==
The Lakeport brand is now owned by AB InBev, which still sells beer with the Lakeport label in the Ontario market.

In May 2014, the Hamilton Port Authority leased the gutted brewery building to a partnership of two craft breweries, Collective Arts Brewing and Nickel Brook Brewing.

After Collective Arts grew in popularity, they bought out Nickelbrook's share of the facility and are now the sole brand produced there.
