= Marriage (Attack in Black album) =

Studio album by Attack in Black
- Released: July 31, 2007
- Recorded: Phase One Studios
- Genre: Punk rock Indie rock Folk rock
- Length: 41:56
- Label: Dine Alone DA009
- Producer: Dan Weston, Attack In Black

Attack in Black chronology
Widows EP (2006)	Marriage (2007)	The Curve of the Earth (2007)

Marriage is the debut album by Canadian rock band Attack in Black, released on July 31, 2007. The album was released by Dine Alone Records as both a CD and digital download. The album debuted at #85 on the Canadian Albums Chart. The album featured the single "Young Leaves", which was a hit on rock radio stations in Canada. The album won "NXNE Favourite New Indie Record Release" at the 2007 CASBY Awards.

== Critical reception ==
Professional ratings
Review scores
Source	Rating
Punknews.org	4/5 stars

Ben Conoley of Punknews.org praised the band's debut album, saying that "Marriage is an absolutely beautiful blend of punk, rock and folk, with each element coming together almost perfectly with each stylistic influence making appearances at all the right times and almost always with enough show. The songs demonstrate an incredible amount of maturity, which one may not expect from a band's first full-length."

== Track listing ==
All tracks are written by Attack in Black.

No.	Title	Length
1.	"Come What May"	3:03
2.	"Young Leaves"	3:18
3.	"Hunger of the Young"	2:40
4.	"Inches and Ages"	3:29
5.	"Marriage"	3:38
6.	"If All I Thought Were True"	5:20
7.	"Broken Things"	3:35
8.	"Footprints"	2:57
9.	"The Love Between You and I"	3:38
10.	"Northern Towns"	3:21
11.	"Husbands"	2:52
12.	"Chimes and Church Bells"	4:10

== Personnel ==
Adapted credits from the liner notes of Marriage.

Attack in Black

- Daniel Tavis Romano – guitar, vocals
- Ian Andrew Romano – drums
- Spencer Arthur Burton – guitar, vocals
- Ian Daniel Kehoe – bass

Additional musicians

- Joni Romano, Darlene Romano, Amy Elder – backup vocals on "If All I Thought Were True" and "The Love Between You and I"
- Dan Weston – backup vocals on "Young Leaves"
- Eric Pridmore – trumpet on "Young Leaves", "If All I Thought Were True", and "The Love Between You and I"
- Victor Belcastro – saxophone on "Come What May" and "If All I Thought Were True"

Artwork

- Dan Weston – art
- Andrew McCracken – layout

Production

- Dan Weston – producer, engineering, mixing
- Attack in Black – producer
- Mark Renner – assistant engineer
- Nick Blagona – mastering (Metalworks Studios)
- Ian Blurton – additional recording (Chemical Sound)
- Dean and Jay – additional engineering (Chemical Sound)
