= Two Crown King =

- Origin: London, Ontario, Canada
- Genres: alternative rock, alternative hip hop, neo soul, funk
- Years active: 2009–2014, 2024–present
- Members: Adam Dick; Sean Goodchild; Dave Hilbert; Drew "DJ DoubleDown" Hopeson; Ajay Massey; Scotty Parker; Jeremy Pimentel
- Website: twocrownking.com

Two Crown King is a London, Ontario, Canada based alternative rock and alternative hip hop band.

== History ==
=== Formation and Is A Demo ===
The band was originally formed in the summer of 2009 by Adam Dick and Sean Goodchild who met while studying at Fanshawe College. They immediately went to work on a four-song demo, Is A Demo, with producer and friend, Dan Weston. The demo was released independently in June, 2009. A single, "A One Man Mess", was released on iTunes on June 11, 2009.

By September 2009, the band had grown to six full-time members. Joining Dick and Goodchild were Pat Maloney on drums, Ajay Massey on guitar, Jeremy Pimentel on bass, and John Yun on keys. On Friday, September 25, 2009, they played their first ever live show, as direct support for Canadian alternative rock act, USS.

Is A Demo was later released in full on iTunes on September 1, 2010.

=== Two Crown King (EP) and lineup change ===
In December 2010, the band recorded a six track, self-titled EP at Jukasa Studios with Vancouver based producer Ben Kaplan.

Immediately following the recording of the album John Yun was permanently replaced by Scotty Parker, former keyboardist of Machete Avenue.

A single, "We Get Down" was released on iTunes on March 1, 2011. Two Crown King (EP) was released on iTunes on July 1, 2011. The artwork for the album was illustrated by Jacqui Oakley and has received global acclaim for its package design.

=== Ben's Song ===
On February 4, 2012, the band released "Ben's Song" on iTunes in partnership with Skate4Cancer. The song was written for a close friend of the band whose mother had died from cancer. All sales from "Ben's Song" are donated to Princess Margaret Hospital.

On February 16, 2012, "Ben's Song" was inducted into FM96's Hall Of Fame after winning the Battle of the New Rock ten consecutive times.

=== Second lineup change ===
Drummer, Pat Maloney, played his last show with the band on September 13, 2012, at Western Fair in London, Ontario. He was replaced by "Jimi" James Tanney. At this time, Drew "DJ DoubleDown" Hopeson also joined the band, increasing the total of full-time members to seven.

=== 1604 (EP) ===
The band's second EP, 1604, was released on April 2, 2013 and debuted at #61 on the Canadian iTunes Chart.

== Discography ==
- Is A Demo – 2009
- Two Crown King (EP) – 2011
- "Ben's Song" (single) – 2012
- 1604 (EP) – 2013

== Band members ==
=== Current members ===
- Adam Dick – Lead vocals
- Sean Goodchild – Lead vocals
- Drew "DJ DoubleDown" Hopeson – DJ
- Ajay Massey – Guitar/Backing vocals
- Scotty Parker – Keys/Backing vocals
- Jeremy Pimentel – Bass
- Dave Hilbert – Drums

=== Past members ===
- "Jimi" James Tanney – Drums
- John Yun – Keys
- Pat Maloney – Drums
