= The Provincial Archive =

Canadian indie band

- Origin: Edmonton, Alberta, Canada
- Genres: Alternative rock, indie rock, folk rock, indie pop
- Years active: 2009–present
- Labels: Consonant Records, Black Box Music, Bedrooms and Basements
- Members: Craig Schram; Stephen Tchir; Bramwell Park
- Past members: Dave Meagher; Ryan Podlubny; Nathan Burge
- Website: www.theprovincialarchive.com

The Provincial Archive are a Canadian indie band. Their releases have spanned genres from indie folk to alt rock. Their music has been compared to R.E.M. and The Shins as well as early Weezer and Elliott Smith.

== History ==
The band released its debut album, Nameless Places, in 2009 locally in the band's hometown, Edmonton, Alberta.

Their second album, Maybe We Could Be Holy, followed in 2010. The band supported Maybe We Could Be Holy in part with a cross-Canada tour which included performances in the provincial archive buildings of eight of the ten Canadian provinces.

The band's third album, It's All Shaken Wonder, was released in Germany in May 2014 and in North America on August 19, 2014 on the Black Box Music label. On June 10, 2014, a four-song EP Hide Like A Secret was released via iTunes, along with a music video for the first track Daisy Garden. It's All Shaken Wonder was awarded the Edmonton Music Prize on December 1, 2014. All work up to and including this release was self-produced by the band, and the band's primary songwriter, Craig Schram. Following this release, the project was downsized to a trio with the departure of members Ryan Podlubny in 2014, and Nathan Burge in 2015. Podlubny was replaced by Stephen Tchir, a long-time musical collaborator with both Park and Schram .

The band's fourth, self-titled, effort would be released in November 2015. The release was produced by Nik Kozub, and was recorded live-off-the-floor as a trio. The release has drawn early comparisons to 90s alt rock, and represents a departure from the band's folk and pop influenced beginnings.

Park, Schram and Tchir also perform as the singer-songwriter Charlotte Cornfield's touring band.

== Band members ==
- Craig Schram
- Bramwell Park
- Stephen Tchir
- Ryan Podlubny (Former)
- Nathan Burge (Former)
- David Meagher (Former)

Based in Edmonton, Alberta, the band was formed by Craig Schram, Nathan Burge and Ryan Podlubny following the demise of earlier musical projects. The band subsequently enlisted drummer Dave Meagher, who was with the band briefly before being replaced by Bramwell Park. The project was downsized to a trio with the departure of Ryan Podlubny in 2014 and Nathan Burge in 2015. Podlubny was replaced by Stephen Tchir, a long-time musical collaborator with both Park and Schram. All of the band's current and former members are multi-instrumentalists.

== Discography ==
=== Studio albums ===
- Nameless Places (2009)
- Maybe We Could Be Holy (Bedrooms and Basements, 2010)
- It's All Shaken Wonder (Black Box, 2014)
- Good Luck (Consonant, 2023)

=== Extended plays ===
- Hide Like A Secret (Black Box, 2014)
- The Provincial Archive (Consonant, 2015)

=== Singles ===
- "Imaginary Friends" (Consonant, 2018)

== Music videos ==
- "Common Cards" (2013)
- "Daisy Garden" (2014)
- "The Market" (2014)
