= Count Yourself In =

2006 studio album by Ten Second Epic

Studio album by Ten Second Epic
- Released: October 10, 2006
- Recorded: The Farm, Gibson, British Columbia
- Genre: Alternative rock; emo
- Length: 34:47
- Label: Black Box Recordings
- Producer: Garth Richardson

Ten Second Epic chronology
One More For The Road (2004)	Count Yourself In (2006)	The Virtual EP (2008)

Count Yourself In is the debut album by the pop punk band Ten Second Epic. It was released October 10, 2006. There were music videos released for "Suck It Up, Princess", "Count Yourself In", and "Old Habits Die Hard" and they have received notable airplay on Much Music. The "Old Habits Die Hard" video even made the MuchMusic Countdown, debuting on June 29, 2007. The songs "Suck It Up Princess" and "Boys Will Be Boys" were later released on The Virtual EP in 2008 as redux versions.

== Track listing ==
No.	Title	Length
1.	"Suck It Up Princess"	4:46
2.	"Old Habits Die Hard"	3:44
3.	"All You Want to Be"	2:51
4.	"Count Yourself In"	3:20
5.	"I Got What I Wanted, Lost What I Had"	4:03
6.	"Boys Will Be Boys"	4:03
7.	"How the West Was Lost"	3:05
8.	"It's Better on the Floor"	3:16
9.	"Avenue Days"	3:35
10.	"Point Blank Victoria"	4:15
