= The Union (The Glorious Sons album) =

Studio album by the Glorious Sons
- Released: September 14, 2014
- Studio: Catherine North (Hamilton); Noble Street (Toronto)
- Length: 40:58
- Label: Black Box
- Producer: Gavin Brown; John-Angus MacDonald

The Glorious Sons chronology
The Union (2014)	Young Beauties and Fools (2017)

Singles from The Union
- 1. "Heavy" Released: 2014; 2. "Lightning" Released: 2014

The Union is the debut album by Canadian rock band the Glorious Sons. Released on September 14, 2014, The Union contains the singles "Heavy", "Lightning" and "The Contender", which led to a 2015 Juno Award nomination for Best Rock Album.

== Appearances in media ==
- "Heavy" featured as the official theme song for WWE's pay-per view event Battleground
- "The Contender" features on FS1's UFC Fightnight

== Track listing ==
All tracks are written by The Glorious Sons.

The Union track listing
No.	Title	Length
1.	"Man Made Man"	3:42
2.	"Heavy"	2:50
3.	"Hard Times"	3:35
4.	"Lightning"	3:44
5.	"White Noise"	3:01
6.	"The Contender"	3:38
7.	"Mama"	3:02
8.	"The Union"	3:36
9.	"Gordie"	3:11
10.	"Lover Under Fire"	4:01
11.	"Amigo"	6:41
Total length:		40:58

== Personnel ==
Credits adapted from the album's liner notes.

=== The Glorious Sons ===
- Brett Emmons – vocals, keyboard
- Jay Emmons – lead guitars, vocals
- Andrew Young – guitars, vocals
- Chris Huot – bass
- Adam Paquette – drums, vocals

=== Additional contributors ===
- John-Angus MacDonald – production (tracks 1, 3, 5–11)
- Gavin Brown – production (2, 4)
- Dan Hosh – engineering (1, 3, 6, 8–11)
- Scott Peacock – engineering (1, 3, 6, 8–11)
- Kevin O'Leary – engineering (2, 4)
- David Mohacsi – engineering, Pro Tools (2, 4)
- Nick Detoro – engineering (5, 7)
- Alex Krotz – engineering assistance (2, 4)
- Alastair "The Bird Dog" Sims – Pro Tools editing (2, 4)
- Dylan Groff – Pro Tools editing (2, 4)
- Werner F – mixing (1–6, 8–11)
- Gus van Go – mixing (1–6, 8–11)
- Gordie Johnson – mixing (7)
- Harry Hess – mastering
- Patricia Shirley – backing vocals (1, 3, 6, 8–11)
- Simone Smithson – backing vocals (1, 3, 6, 8–11)
- Eddie Harsch – additional piano (1, 3, 6, 8–11)
- Genevieve Melito – backing vocals (2, 4)
- Megan Akey – backing vocals (2, 4)
- Benjamin Laughlin – layout, design
- Jess Baumung – back cover photo

== Charts ==
Chart (2014)	Peak position
Canadian Albums (Billboard)	23

== Certifications ==
Region	Certification	Certified units/sales
Canada (Music Canada)	Gold	40,000^{‡}
^{‡} Sales+streaming figures based on certification alone.
