= Holy Shit (Living with Lions album) =

Studio album by Living with Lions
- Released: May 17, 2011
- Genre: Pop punk
- Length: 35:53
- Labels: Black Box; Adeline

Living with Lions chronology
| Make Your Mark (2008) | Holy Shit (2011) | Island (2018) |

Holy Shit is the second full-length studio album by Canadian pop punk band Living with Lions, released on May 17, 2011.

The album is the first and only release to feature vocalist Stu Ross.

A music video was made for the song "Honesty, Honestly".

== Track listing ==
1. Pieces
2. Regret Song
3. In Your Light
4. Honesty, Honestly
5. Whatever You Want
6. Maple Drive Is Still Alive
7. Wake Up
8. Matthew's Anthem
9. Rough Around the Edges
10. When We Were Young

== Controversy ==
Shortly after the release of Holy Shit, the band took criticism from American media and the Canadian Heritage minister regarding the album's physical content, with packaging and liner notes that imitate the bible and depict Jesus Christ as a turd.

The album was designed to look like a Bible, with the cover and spine resembling a Bible and liner notes written like Bible verses on faded pages. The album is also subtitled "The Poo Testament".

What drew most criticism was that the liner notes acknowledge the support of the government of Canada through FACTOR (Foundation Assisting Canadian Talent on Recordings), with its logo displayed prominently on the back cover.

The Vancouver Sun reported that the album first drew attention of entertainment magazine L.A. Weekly, followed by Canadian Heritage Minister James Moore.

“The content of this CD is offensive and the fact that it is clearly designed to offend a group of Canadians based on their faith is simply wrong,” James Maunder, Moore's spokesman, said in a statement sent to The Vancouver Sun. “The Minister has called Duncan McKie, president and CEO of FACTOR to express his profound disappointment with this content.”

Black Box Music co-owner Ian Stanger said that the album is being taken too seriously, and pointed out that the actual lyrical content of the songs contain no references to the Bible or religion.

“We allow our artists to take whatever artistic course they decide to and we value the support of FACTOR through Canadian Heritage,” Stanger told The Vancouver Sun. “I think there’s a tongue-in-cheek element of this record people may be missing. I don’t think it’s meant to be a serious criticism or commentary on religion. It’s a joke.”

FACTOR said that "we realize that we have a responsibility to the public and our funders to enforce reasonable limits on the content of the projects we fund," in a statement on its website. FACTOR is now reviewing complaints from the public over the album's artwork, and will decide whether further action is needed.
