= Living with Lions (band) =

Canadian pop punk band

- Origin: Vancouver, British Columbia, Canada
- Genres: Pop punk, punk rock
- Years active: 2007–present
- Labels: Adeline, Black Box, Ice Grills, Redfield,
- Members: Chase Brenneman; Landon Matz; Craig Spelliscy; Loren Legare
- Past members: Matt Postal; Shayne Lundberg; Stu Ross; Bill Crook
- Website: myspace.com/livingwithlions

Living with Lions is a Canadian pop punk band formed in 2007 in Vancouver. They are currently signed to Black Box Music in Canada and Adeline Records in the United States.

== History ==
The band recorded their debut EP, Dude Manor in 2006 with Stu McKillop (member of the disbanded Vancouver group Daggermouth); it was released in 2007 on Black Box. They then released their first full-length album, Make Your Mark the following year. Both albums were re-released in 2009 after the band signed to Adeline Records; Dude Manor on 10" vinyl and Make Your Mark on 12" vinyl.

Music videos were made for the songs "A Bottle of Charades" from Make Your Mark and "Later is Better" from Dude Manor.

The band started preparing and recording their second full-length album titled Holy Shit in early 2010, set for release on May 17, 2011. They also went through several member changes; Shayne Lundberg was replaced by Bill Crook of A Textbook Tragedy on bass, and singer Matt Postal was replaced by Stuart Ross of Lowtalker and Misery Signals.

The band released their second full-length album, Holy Shit, on May 17, 2011, shortly after releasing a music video for "Honesty, Honestly". Holy Shit is the first release to feature the new singer, Stu Ross (Lowtalker, Misery Signals). Bassist Shayne Lundberg completed his parts for the album before Bill Crook (A Textbook Tragedy) had joined.

Shortly after the release of Holy Shit, the band took criticism from American media and the Canadian Heritage minister regarding the album's physical content, with packaging and liner notes that imitate the bible and depict Jesus Christ as a turd.

In 2012, Stu Ross left the band to play guitar in Comeback Kid and Matt Postal briefly rejoined. Postal's last show with the band was in August of that year. Chase Brenneman then took over sole lead vocals and the band released their third album Island in 2018. Bill Crook was a member of Spiritbox from 2018 to 2022, and died in July 2024.

== Band members ==
=== Current ===
- Chase Brenneman – guitar, vocals
- Landon Matz – guitar
- Craig Spelliscy – guitar
- Loren Legare – drums

=== Former ===
- Bill Crook – bass
- Shayne Lundberg – bass
- Stuart Ross – vocals
- Matt Postal – vocals

== Discography ==
- Dude Manor (EP) (2007)
- Make Your Mark (2008)
- Holy Shit (2011)
- Some of My Friends Appear Dead to Me (EP) (2013)
- Island (2018)
