= Years (by One Thousand Fingertips) =

Studio album by Attack in Black
- Released: March 10, 2009
- Recorded: Recorded and mixed in the spring and summer of 2008 by Attack In Black, "Liberties", "I'm a Rock", and "Moon of Day" recorded by Shotgun Jimmie at the Marshwinds Farm and were mixed by Dan Weston and Attack In Black
- Genre: Folk rock
- Length: 51:34
- Label: Dine Alone Records
- Producer: Self-produced

Attack in Black chronology
The Curve of the Earth (2007)	Years (by One Thousand Fingertips) (2009)

Singles from Years (by One Thousand Fingertips)
- 1. "Beasts" Released: February 24, 2009

Professional ratings
Review scores
Source	Rating
Punknews	4.5/5 stars

Years (by One Thousand Fingertips) is the third and final studio album by Canadian folk rock band Attack in Black, released on March 10, 2009 on Dine Alone Records. The album was released both on CD and on one thousand 12" vinyl records. Singles released from the album are "Beasts" (February 24, 2009) and "Liberties" (July 2009). The layout and photography present in both CD and vinyl versions were by Daniel Romano and Ian Kehoe.

== Track listing ==
No.	Title	Length
1.	"Years (by One Thousand Fingertips)"	4:04
2.	"Leaving Your Death in a Flowerbed"	2:30
3.	"Birmingham"	4:38
4.	"The Greater Niagara Circle Route"	4:12
5.	"Liberties"	3:32
6.	"I Could Turn"	2:41
7.	"Beasts"	3:04
8.	"Leather Jacket"	2:32
9.	"Messenger Bird"	4:04
10.	"Seeds"	2:11
11.	"Slender Loris"	3:55
12.	"I'm a Rock"	2:00
13.	"Blood (in the Tracks)"	3:34
14.	"Moon of Day"	4:00
15.	"Brownness of Her Curls"	1:19
16.	"The Surface I Would Travel"	3:25

== Personnel ==
Attack In Black

- Daniel Romano – lead vocals, guitar
- Spencer Burton – guitar, organ, vocals
- Ian Kehoe – bass, vocals
- Ian Romano – drums, percussion

Additional musicians

- Julie Fader – guest vocals on "Birmingham"
- Penelope Smart – guest vocals on "Liberties"
- Ilse Kramer – guest vocals on "Liberties"
- Katie – guest vocals on "Liberties"
- Julie Doiron – guest vocals on "I'm a Rock"
- Shotgun Jimmie – keyboard on "I'm a Rock"
- Julien Brousseau – chime performance on "Liberties"
