= Spencer Burton =

Canadian musician

Spencer Burton is a Canadian musician who has been active both as a member of the indie rock band Attack in Black and as a solo country singer-songwriter. He also previously performed and recorded under the name Grey Kingdom, releasing two EPs and two albums under that name in the early 2010s, before deciding to use his own name on later releases.

His 2019 album The Mountain Man received a Canadian Folk Music Award nomination for Best Children's Album at the 16th Canadian Folk Music Awards.

His album Coyote was recorded in 2019 and was originally planned for release in 2020, but due to the COVID-19 pandemic in Canada its release was postponed to February 2021.

== Discography ==
=== as Grey Kingdom ===
- The Grey Kingdom (2010)
- Eulogy of Her and Her and Her (2011)
- The Weeping Suns (2012)
- Light, I'll Call Your Name Out "Darkness" (2012)

=== as Spencer Burton ===
- Don't Let the World See Your Love (2014)
- Some That Were, Some That Are and Some That Will Be (2015)
- Songs Of (2017)
- The Mountain Man (2019)
- Coyote (2021)
