= Make Your Mark (Seth Lakeman album) =

Studio album by Seth Lakeman
- Released: November 18, 2021
- Label: Honour Oak

Seth Lakeman chronology
A Pilgrim's Tale (2020)	Make Your Mark (2021)	Somerset Sessions (2023)

Make Your Mark is the eleventh studio album by English folk musician Seth Lakeman. It was released on 18 November 2021 by Honour Oak Records.

Professional ratings
Review scores
Source	Rating
MusicOMH	3.5/5 stars

== Track listing ==
Make Your Mark track listing
No.	Title	Writer(s)	Length
1.	"Hollow"	Seth Lakeman; Reg Meuross	3:24
2.	"The Giant"	Lakeman; David Prowse	3:21
3.	"Love Will Still Remain"	Lakeman; Prowse	4:39
4.	"Bound to Someone"	Lakeman; Prowse	3:57
5.	"Make Your Mark"	Lakeman; Prowse	4:01
6.	"Coming for You soon"	Lakeman; Prowse	4:31
7.	"Higher We Aspire"	Lakeman; Prowse	4:18
8.	"The Lark"	Lakeman; Kathryn L Garrod	4:59
9.	"Side by Side"	Lakeman; Prowse	5:05
10.	"Fallen Friend"	Lakeman; Prowse	4:20
11.	"Shoals to turn"	Lakeman; Prowse	4:40
12.	"Underground"	Lakeman; Prowse	4:49
13.	"Change"	Lakeman; Prowse	3:51
14.	"Constantly"	Lakeman; Prowse	6:33

== Charts ==
Chart performance for Make Your Mark
Chart (2022)	Peak position
Scottish Albums (Official Charts)	99
UK Album Downloads (Official Charts)	46
UK Folk Albums (Official Charts)	1
UK Independent Albums (Official Charts)	11
