= Teenage Kicks (band) =

Canadian alternative rock band

- Origin: Toronto, Ontario, Canada
- Genre: Alternative rock
- Years active: 2010–2015
- Members: Peter van Helvoort; Jeff van Helvoort
- Past members: Keegan Powell; Patrick Marchent; Christian Turner; Cameron Brunt
- Website: www.teenagekicksrock.com

Teenage Kicks were a Canadian alternative rock band based in Toronto, Canada. The band consisted of brothers Peter and Jeff van Helvoort.

== Biography ==
Teenage Kicks formed in early 2010 and began performing by the summer of the same year in support of their first 7" release, which featured the songs "Shook Our Bones" and "I Get What You Give". The original lineup was rounded out by the addition of Cameron Brunt on drums and Patrick Marchent on guitar. This was the configuration used when the band began work on their first self-produced EP titled Rational Anthems near the end of 2010. The EP was released on April 29, 2011. The EP garnered a good amount of positive press and put the band onto stage with an array of artists from Sloan to AWOLNATION to Kaiser Chiefs. By the fall of 2011, the band had added Christian Turner on guitar in order to become a five-piece. They began work on their next self-produced EP, Be On My Side, which was released on March 2, 2012, and was mixed by Dan Weston (Attack in Black, Shad, Classified). The band also launched a free music service known simply as "The Singles Club", which offers no-cost downloads to members on a bi-monthly basis. The Club releases thus far have delved into covers, b-sides, alternate versions and a full-length live album.

In October 2012, Jeff and Patrick left the group and played their last show at Lee's Palace in their hometown of Toronto, but by January 2013 Jeff had returned and Christian was no longer with the group. The lineup had returned to a four-piece and lead guitar duties had been taken over by Keegan Powell. The band announced that they would be traveling to West Hollywood, California to make their first full-length album in April 2013 with Alain Johannes (Jimmy Eat World, Queens of the Stone Age, Arctic Monkeys). Prior to recording, the band partook in their first SXSW festival. A couple of months after their arrival home, it was announced through the band's website that the record they had made in California would be shelved and that Peter van Helvoort would be rerecording and producing the second attempt at their debut album. The band played their last show ever at the Horseshoe Tavern on May 23, 2015. Former members projects include Christian Punk Band, Spells Of Vertigo, and Keegan Powell's eponymous solo project.

Peter Van Helvoort asserts there will never be a reunion.

== Discography ==
Release date	Title	Label
August 2010	Shook Our Bones 7"	Self-Released
29 April 2011	Rational Anthems EP	Self-Released
2 March 2012	Be On My Side EP	EMI
29 April 2014	Spoils Of Youth	Rezolute/Universal

== Band members ==
=== Past ===
- Keegan Powell
- Patrick Marchent
- Christian Turner
- Cameron Brunt
- Peter Van Helvoort
- Jeff Van Helvoort
- Konrad Commisso
