= Chris Koster (musician) =

Canadian rock singer-songwriter

- Origin: Kingston, Ontario, Canada
- Genres: Rock, experimental
- Occupations: Musician, songwriter
- Instruments: Singing, guitar
- Label: Orange
- Formerly of: The Glorious Sons
- Website: chriskoster.ca

Chris Koster is a Canadian rock singer, songwriter, and musician, who has been active both as a solo artist and as a former member of the band The Glorious Sons.

== Career ==
Chris Koster is an experimental singer-songwriter based in Kingston, Ontario, Canada. With influences said to range from Trent Reznor to The Beatles, his musical style encompasses many genres and moods, from 'soft' pop songs to charged metal numbers. Performing on keyboard, guitar and vocals, Koster continues in the solo artist tradition of the likes of Gary Numan and Prince – self-contained and self-produced.

For his two albums, Secrets of the Lonely and Sex, Love & Morality, Koster played the majority of the instruments; however, he invited his band The Lonely to contribute to a few songs. He toured extensively from 2005 to the present.

He is the brother of Dave "Billy Ray" Koster, a longtime member of the road crew for The Tragically Hip.

On August 29, 2023, The Glorious Sons announced Koster's departure from the band 1 week before the Glory tour.

== Secrets of the Lonely (2004) ==
Koster's first album, on The Orange Record Label, was recorded and self-produced at The Bathouse Recording Studio, The Tragically Hip's studio in Bath, Ontario.

=== Track listing ===
All songs written by Chris Koster, except where noted:

1. "Camouflage" – 4:04
2. "Catastrophizing" – 3:37
3. "If U See Me (When I'm Like This" – 3:53
4. "Wartime Romance" – 4:25
5. "The Alarmist (Don't Worry)" – 4:59
6. "Love In The Western World" – 4:08
7. "Sufferville" – 5:44
8. "Honestly" – 2:17
9. "When U Were Mine" (Prince) – 4:58
10. "Secrets of the Lonely" – 4:57
11. "In This Life" – 3:13
12. "Sincerity Blues" – 1:01
13. "Mary Ann" – 4:13
14. "I Don't Care (Anymore)" – 4:08
15. "In This Life" – 6:05

Credits

The album credits are as follows:

- Chris Koster – Lyricist
- Lindsey Hilliard – Violin
- Michael Olsen – Cello
- Aaron Holmberg – Producer
- Mark Makowy – Producer
- Byron Wong – Producer, Photography, Processing

== Sex, Love & Morality (2008) ==
Sex, Love & Morality, with its first single "Heavy Hearted" on The Orange Record Label in October 2007, was Koster's second album. The music is granular, complex and multi-layered but also remarkably accessible and memorable. One reason for this progression was his relationship with producer Bob Ezrin. "He helped me hone my craft," says Koster, "he really pushed me to do something different and challenged me".
