= The Curve of the Earth =

Studio album by Attack in Black
- Released: November 13, 2007
- Genre: Indie rock, acoustic, folk
- Length: 34:14
- Label: Dine Alone

Attack in Black chronology
Marriage (2007)	The Curve of the Earth (2007)	Years (by One Thousand Fingertips) (2009)

Professional ratings
Review scores
Source	Rating
Punknews.org	4/5 stars
Sputnikmusic	4/5 stars

The Curve of the Earth is the second album by Canadian band Attack in Black, released on November 13, 2007. The album was released on one thousand 12" vinyl records, and was also available for digital download. The album was released on the indie label Dine Alone Records alongside their EP Northern Towns.

== Recording ==
In September 2007, the band started recording songs on a two-input tape recorder Daniel Romano had found around his house. All of the members spent two days and two nights in Spencer Burton's sunroom, recording everything they wrote, and contributing to vocals and different instruments. Late into the second day, the band decided to release their recordings, although this was not their original intention.

== Track listing ==
1. "I'm Going to Forget" - 4:16
2. "Ever Faster" - 2:32
3. "Sparrow" - 2:35
4. "Water Touched My Face" - 2:28
5. "Now That I'm Dying" - 3:34
6. "You're Such an Only Child" - 1:57
7. "Morning Bird / Water Line" - 2:56
8. "Ever Bright, Ever Blue" - 2:12
9. "Rope" - 2:23
10. "Sounds of Dawn and Dusk" - 4:51
11. "Lady of the Lourdes" - 1:54
12. "The Curve of the Earth" - 2:43
