= Hometown (Ten Second Epic album) =

2009 studio album by Ten Second Epic

Studio album by Ten Second Epic
- Released: January 27, 2009
- Recorded: 2008
- Genre: Alternative rock; emo
- Length: 36:50
- Label: Black Box
- Producer: Garth Richardson

Ten Second Epic chronology
The Virtual EP (2008)	Hometown (2009)

Singles from Hometown
- 1. "Life Times" Released: November 10, 2008; 2. "Welcome to Wherever You Are" Released: March 30, 2009

Professional ratings
Review scores
Source	Rating
Rock Sound	7/10 stars

Hometown is the second studio album from Ten Second Epic. It was released January 27, 2009 on Black Box Recordings. It was made available for full streaming on their MySpace page on January 23. The first single, "Life Times", was released on November 10, 2008 on YouTube and later on television. The second single was "Welcome to Wherever You Are" and was released on March 30, along with a music video. The third single is "Every Day" that debuted with a video.

== Track listing ==
No.	Title	Length
1.	"Welcome to Wherever You Are"	3:26
2.	"Life Times"	3:17
3.	"Every Day" (featuring Lights)	3:28
4.	"Yours to Lose"	3:14
5.	"Costa La Vista Baby"	3:05
6.	"Well That's the Thing"	2:49
7.	"Windows"	3:59
8.	"Get So Far"	3:32
9.	"Stand Up"	3:12
10.	"First and Foremost"	3:26
11.	"Further Now"	3:54
