= Rich Kidd =

Canadian musical artist

- Also known as: Rich Kidd Beats, Ritchie
- Born: Ritchie Acheampong; April 28, 1987 (age 39); Toronto, Ontario, Canada
- Origin: Mississauga, Ontario, Canada
- Genre: Hip hop
- Occupations: Record producer; rapper; director; actor
- Years active: 2007–present
- Labels: Black Box Recordings, R Way
- Website: richkiddbeats.com

Ritchie Acheampong (born April 28, 1987), better known as Rich Kidd, is a Canadian hip hop recording artist, record producer and film/video director from Toronto, Ontario. He is a two-time nominee for the Juno Award for Rap Recording of the Year as a solo artist, garnering nominations at the Juno Awards of 2013 for The Closers and at the Juno Awards of 2014 for In My Opinion. In 2013, he formed the project Naturally Born Strangers with collaborators Tona and Adam Bomb. That group's debut release, The Legends League Presents: Naturally Born Strangers, won the Juno Award for Rap Recording of the Year at the Juno Awards of 2015.

== Early life ==
Acheampong was born in Toronto, Ontario to Ghanaian immigrant parents, Elizabeth Acheampong, a warehouse laborer, and Morgan Acheampong, a taxi driver. At age 3, his family moved to the suburb of Mississauga and frequently within the city. When his parents divorced, he and his mother moved to a co-operative housing area in Erin Mills (west Mississauga), locally known as the Ridgeway complex. He graduated from Loyola Catholic Secondary School and was also a graduate of The Remix Project; an educational youth program for music, art, and business.

== Career ==
=== Debut ===
Rich Kidd began producing music as a teenager and received his first production credit at 19 years old for rap artists Frank n Dank's "Get Right Song". In 2007, he released the first of an annual compilation series called We on Some Rich Kidd Shit currently composed of seven volumes and featuring nearly 100 artists. In 2007, he produced four songs on rap artist Drake's Comeback Season mixtape.

=== 2009-present ===
In 2009, rap artists Busta Rhymes and Billy Danze from MOP released the song "Undescribable" using a Rich Kidd production. That same year, performing artist K-os released his fourth studio album which included the single "I Wish I Knew Natalie Portman" featuring Nelly Furtado and Saukrates produced by Rich Kidd. We On Some Rich Kidd Shit Vol. 3 was released in July 2009, featuring "The Search", a song featuring Drake and Saukrates.

in 2010, Rich Kidd performed at Canadian Hip Hop festival Manifesto, and received production credits on Shad's Juno award-winning album TSOL with the song "Listen". He received a nomination for Producer of the Year at the 2010 Stylus awards and returned the following year to five nominations including an award for Artist Mixtape of the Year.

Rich Kidd launched his directorial debut Trespassing, a semi-biographical short film featured in the City Life Film Project and debuted at the Toronto International Film Festival's Bell Lightbox. "Take It Slow" served as his debut solo single. Soon after Rich Kidd was named top 5 local MCs by the Toronto Star and began to tour the UK and Australia.

In 2011, Kendrick Lamar stated in an interview that Rich Kidd is a Canadian artist he would like to work with. The two have unreleased material that was recorded before Kendrick started working on Good Kid, M.A.A.D. City. Jay-Z's engineer, Young Guru, has said that Rich Kidd is one of his favorite producers due to him being exposed to his production on the unreleased Jay Electronica album: Act II.

In 2012, Rich Kidd released an instrumental mixtape Kiddstrumentals and his first studio album The Closers along with Vancouver MC SonReal which landed him a Juno Nomination for Rap Recording of the Year and another nomination for Hip Hop Video of the Year for the song "Hometown".

In April 2013, Rich Kidd released his most complete solo full length project In My Opinion which features singles "SYKE", "Can I Get A [Bom Bom]", and "I'd Be Lying". The album was nominated for a Juno Award in 2014. In March 2013, the CBC named Rich Kidd "your favourite Canadian rapper's favourite rapper" in their top 25 list.

In 2014, Rich Kidd hosted several Noisey and Vice Media documentaries such as Rich Kidd in Iqaluit and First Out Here: Indigenous Hip Hop in Canada that continue to play on Viceland, Vice's television station.

In 2015, Rich Kidd along with rappers Adam Bomb and Tona were nominated for and won the Juno Award for Best Rap Recording beating out Drake protege P. Reign. This same year they won the Sirius XM Indie award for Best Hip Hop/Rap Group.

In 2017, Rich Kidd starred alongside Melinda Shankar and Pat Thornton in the movie Filth City, a loosely-based parody of the Rob Ford crack scandal. Rich Kidd is also very much involved in the community arts sector, working with various organizations and mentorship programs. He is currently serving as the Recording Arts program leader of The Remix Project.

== Discography ==
=== Albums ===
- The Closers (2012) (with SonReal)
- In My Opinion (2013)
- The Legends League Presents: Naturally Born Strangers (2013) (with Adam Bomb and Tona)
- Drill God (2015)

=== Mixtapes ===
- We on Some Rich Kidd Shit Vol. 1 (2007)
- We on Some Rich Kidd Shit Vol. 2: Piecing Together the Game (2008)
- We on Some Rich Kidd Shit Vol. 3: From the Bottom of the Can (2009)
- We on Some Rich Kidd Shit Vol. 4: The Boiling Point (2010)
- We on Some Rich Kidd Shit Vol. 5: Born to Win (2011)
- We on Some Rich Kidd Shit Vol. 6: City on My Back (2012)
- Kiddstrumentals V.1 (2012)
- The Closers (with SonReal) (2012)
- We on Some Rich Kidd Shit Vol. 7: The People's Champ (2013)
- Kiddstrumentals V.2 (2013)

=== Singles ===
- "Take It Slow" (2010)
- "MJ Year" (2010)
- "Don't Sleep on Me" (2011)
- "Back in the Day" (2012)
- "SYKE" (2013)
- "Can I Get A [Bom Bom]" (2013)
- "I'd Be Lying" (2013)

== Awards and nominations ==
=== Awards ===
- Juno Awards 2011 – Rap Recording of the Year (Shad's TSOL produced by Rich Kidd)
- Stylus Awards 2011 – Artist Mixtape of the Year Award for We On Some Rich Kidd Shit Volume 4: The Boiling Point
- Toronto Independent Music Awards 2010 – Best Live Urban Award
- Juno Awards 2015 – Rap Recording of the Year for The Legends League Presents: Naturally Born Strangers
- Sirius XM Indie Awards 2015 - RAP/HIP-HOP ARTIST OR GROUP OF THE YEAR for Naturally Born Strangers (Legends League)

=== Nominations ===
Juno Awards 2013

- Rap Recording of the Year Nomination for Rich Kidd and SonReal's The Closers
- Rap Recording of the Year for JD Era's No Handouts
- Rap Recording of the Year for Maestro Fresh Wes's Black Tuxedo

Stylus Awards 2011

- Hip Hop Single of the Year (2x)
- R&B Single of the Year
- Producer of the Year

Stylus Awards 2012

- Artist Mixtape of the Year - We on Some Rich Kidd Shit Vol. 5: Born to Win

Muchmusic Video Awards 2010

- Hip Hop Video of the Year – K-os' "I Wish I Knew Natalie Portman" (produced by Rich Kidd)
- Director of the Year – Director X for K-os' "I Wish I Knew Natalie Portman" (produced by Rich Kidd)

Muchmusic Video Awards 2013

- Hip Hop Video of the Year – with SonReal' "Hometown"

IHeartRadio Muchmusic Video Awards 2015

- Hip Hop Video of the Year – with Naturally Born Strangers "No One Knows My Struggle"

IHeartRadio Muchmusic Video Awards 2016

- Best Post Production – with Naturally Born Strangers "Jameson Ave"

IHeartRadio Muchmusic Video Awards 2017

- Hip Hop Video of the Year – with Tassnata' "Let's Go"
