= Ten Second Epic =

Canadian alternative rock band

- Also known as: TSE
- Origin: Edmonton, Alberta, Canada
- Genres: Alternative rock, pop punk, emo
- Years active: 2002–2014, 2025
- Labels: Black Box Music (CAN); Bullion Records (JAP); Hassle Records (EU & AUS)
- Past members: Andrew Usenik; Daniel Carriere; Craig Spelliscy; Sandy MacKinnon; Patrick Birtles
- Website: tensecondepic.com

Ten Second Epic was a Canadian five-piece alternative rock band from Edmonton. The band formed in 2002 consisting of Andrew Usenik (vocals), Daniel Carriere (guitar), Craig Spelliscy (guitar), Sandy MacKinnon (bass), and Patrick Birtles (drums). TSE released three full-length albums in the course of their career, Count Yourself In, Hometown, and Better Off. The band officially announced their breakup on February 25, 2014, and did their final tour in May 2014. The band reunited for two shows in Edmonton, Alberta, on November 21 and 22, 2025.

== History ==
=== Early years (2002–2006) ===
The band started in 2002 as a casual project for 5 high school friends, practicing in basement of drummer Patrick Birtles parents' house. After playing a handful of local shows in Edmonton at various all-ages venues, the band recorded the Your Famous Last Words EP with friend and current Shout Out Out Out Out member Nik Kozub. The EP was a 5-song disc pressed by the band members and sold at shows. The band began playing shows across Western Canada and eventually committed their next release to local Edmonton independent record label Farway Records.

The band soon after returned to the studio to record the One More for the Road EP with friend Real Cardinal. For the release of the EP in 2004, the band played a free show at the Edmonton Events Center which ended up filling the venue to capacity at 1600 people, leaving hundreds more outside. The show caught the eye of the Edmonton media and sparked several featured on the band including being voted the "Best Band in Edmonton" by SEE Magazine. Soon after the release, Farway Records closed their doors and the band re-released the EP independently.

One More for the Road went on to sell nearly 4,000 units across Canada & the US (mostly through offstage sales at shows). As well, the band began to gain a presence online through the popularity of the song Home In The Heartland. The band's long-standing commitment to touring endlessly across Canada was well served during the release, with highlights including playing all of the Canadian dates on the Warped Tour and opening multiple Canadian dates of the Taste of Chaos tour.

=== Count Yourself In (2006–2009) ===
Following the moderate success of One More for the Road, Ten Second Epic explored the possibility of recording with an experienced producer for their next record, which led to catching the ear of Canadian producer Garth Richardson. However, his schedule seemed to prevent them from working together. In March 2006, the band played a showcase at Canadian Music Week, and on the drive home from Toronto to Edmonton they received word that a project Garth was working on had canceled, and that he could do their record if they began production immediately. Despite all members still working jobs or attending post-secondary school back home, they decided to keep driving straight to The Farm studios in Gibsons, British Columbia, to begin recording. Still with no record label, the band took out personal loans to fund the project.

Shortly after the record was done, Ten Second Epic signed a licensing agreement for Canada with Blackbox Recordings, originally dubbed Black Box Recordings. The result of Richardson's collaboration with the band was Ten Second Epic's first full-length album, Count Yourself In, released on October 10, 2006.

The music video for the first single "Suck It Up, Princess" was shot by friend Colin Minihan. The video was shot on an abandoned transport boat near Mission, British Columbia, with an $800 budget. During the 12-hour shoot, the band traveled to Langley, British Columbia, in between daytime and night scenes to play the final show of a tour they were on. The video was given light rotation on MuchMusic, which was later upgraded to medium rotation based on the demand from viewer requests. The video is considered the starting point for a strong history of MuchMusic supporting the band and their music videos.

The subsequent singles furthered the success of the album. "Count Yourself In" was the first single to gain substantial radio airplay for the band, breaking into the Top 50 on Active Rock on Canadian Radio. The song was nominated for Rock Song of the Year by Canadian Association of Broadcasters (CAB) for the 11th Annual Canadian Radio Music Awards, and was included on the MuchMusic compilation disc PunchMuch. The video received a nomination for Best Independent Video at the 2007 MuchMusic Video Awards. The video for "Old Habits Die Hard" was the first video by the band to break into the MuchMusic Top 30 Countdown and the song was included on the Big Shiny Tunes 12 compilation, which was certified Gold in Canada (50,000 units) on July 30, 2008. The album also garnered a nomination for Best Rock Group at the 2008 Canadian Independent Music Awards.

During the album cycle the band had several Canadian tours including tours with The Spill Canvas, Hedley, Moneen, Living With Lions, Cartel (US Tour), and playing Virgin Festival (Calgary), Cutting Edge Music Festival, and Wakestock (Toronto).

=== Hometown (2009–2011) ===
Leading up to the release of their next record, Blackbox Recordings released The Virtual EP for an exclusive digital release on October 16, 2008. The EP features two remixes of songs from Count Yourself In ("Suck It Up Princess" and "Boys Will Be Boys"), as well as two songs from Hometown: 'Yours To Lose" and "Life Times". Their second full-length album Hometown was released January 27, 2009, and debuted at No. 16 on the Canadian Album Chart. It has since been released in Japan and Europe.

The first single, "Life Times" received a nomination for Rock Video of the Year at the 2009 MuchMusic Video Awards. While still maintaining the support of Canadian Rock radio stations, it was also the first single by the band to receive significant adds to Canadian CHR radio stations. The third single, which features fellow Canadian and long-time friend LIGHTS was nominated for Best Independent Video at the 2010 MuchMusic Video Awards and was featured on the Big Shiny Tunes 14 compilation. Ten Second Epic also received a nomination for Best New Group at the 2010 Juno Awards

During the album release party for Hometown on February 22, 2009, at the Starlite Room in Edmonton, the band announced the show was being filmed and released as a live DVD. The band has since disclosed that the DVD will be released surrounding the release of their next record.

To support the album the band toured Canada, Japan, Europe, and the US with bands including A Day To Remember, You Me At Six, Silverstein, and Theory of a Deadman. They have also played various festivals including The Bamboozle, 1000 Islands Music Festival, and Virgin Festival (Montreal).

=== Better Off (2011–2014) ===
The band released their third studio full-length album on September 19, 2011, in Australia and Europe on Hassle Records, September 20, 2011, in Canada on Blackbox Records, and September 21, 2011, in Japan on Bullion. The band filmed the music video for first single, "Young Classics", at an Edmonton area dirt biking facility.

Shortly after the release of the album, the band also released a studio documentary of the making of Better Off, as well as a brief history of the band. The DVD was nominated for 'Music DVD of the Year' at the 2013 Juno Awards.

After the release, the band toured through Asia with Simple Plan in January 2012. After touring Japan, they returned home to film the music video for their song "Better Off", and then immediately set-out on a tour that took the band across the US, UK, and Canada. The following summer, the band again continued the US, this time on the Vans Warped Tour.

On April 28, at the 2012 Edmonton Music Awards, they were nominated for 4 categories, Group of the Year, Album of the Year, Rock Album of the Year, and the People's Choice award. They won Group of the Year.

Early in 2014, the band announced they would no longer be active, and they would be doing one final tour across Canada in May 2014.

=== Reunion (2025) ===
In early 2025, after more than a decade away from the spotlight, the band announced their long-awaited reunion with two back-to-back shows in their hometown of Edmonton.

The first night featured support from Texas King and Drive By Punch, while the second night brought in guests Calling All Captains and The Red Threat.

== Past members ==
- Andrew Usenik – vocals
- Daniel Carriere – guitar
- Craig Spelliscy – guitar
- Sandy MacKinnon – bass guitar
- Patrick Birtles – drums

== Discography ==
=== Albums ===
Year	Album Details	Chart Peak Positions
Year	Album Details	CAN
2006	Count Yourself In: Released: 10 October 2006; Genre: Alternative; Label: Black Box Music, Bullion Records; Format: CD, Digital Download	98
2009	Hometown: Released: 27 January 2009; Genre: Alternative; Label: Black Box Music, Bullion Records, Atticus Black Music; Format: CD, Digital Download	16
2011	Better Off: Released: 20 September 2011; Genre: Alternative; Label:Black Box Music, Bullion Records, Hassle Records; Format: CD, Digital Download	N/A

=== EPs ===
- Your Famous Last Words (2002)
- One More for the Road (2004)
- The Virtual EP (2008)

=== Singles ===
Year	Song	Chart peak		Album
Year	Song	CAN Alt	CAN Rock	Album
2006	"Suck It Up, Princess"	—	—	Count Yourself In
2007	"Count Yourself In"	—	—	Count Yourself In
2007	"Old Habits Die Hard"	—	—	Count Yourself In
2007	"Avenue Days"	—	—	Count Yourself In
2008	"Life Times"	—	—	Hometown
2009	"Welcome to Wherever You Are"	—	—	Hometown
2009	"Every Day" (featuring Lights)	—	—	Hometown
2011	"Young Classics"	22	37	Better Off
2012	"Better Off"	—	—	Better Off
"—" denotes a release that did not chart.

=== Music videos ===
Year	Title	Album	MM CD	Video Premise	Director
2006	"Suck It Up, Princess"	Count Yourself In	—	Performance	Colin Minihan
2007	"Count Yourself In"	Count Yourself In	—	The band ponders leaving their dead end jobs	Colin Minihan
2007	"Old Habits Die Hard"	Count Yourself In	No. 19	A family battles with addiction	Colin Minihan
2007	"Avenue Days"	Count Yourself In	—	The band takes over a small town when a scheduled show is canceled	Colin Minihan
2008	"Life Times"	Hometown	No. 15	The band raises an infant they discover left outside their garage	Cody Fennell, Colin Minihan
2009	"Welcome To Wherever You Are"	Hometown	No. 10	The band films a music video around an unsuspecting couple	Marc Ricciardelli
2009	"Every Day"(featuring LIGHTS)	Hometown	No. 12	A young man attempts to ask his girlfriend for forgiveness	Sean Michael Turrell
2011	"Young Classics"	Better Off	—	Performance	Michael Maxxis
2012	"Better Off"	Better Off	—	The band trains for a hockey game against a mystery opponent	Ben Knechtel
2012	"Runaway"	Better Off	—	Performance in Japan	Chady Awad

=== DVD ===
- “Better Off” - Studio Documentary DVD (2011)

== Awards and nominations ==
Award	Year	Category	Status
MuchMusic Video Award	2007	Best Independent Video	Nominated
Canadian Radio Music Award	2008	Rock	Nominated
Canadian Independent Music Awards	2008	Rock Band of the Year	Nominated
MuchMusic Video Award	2009	Best Rock Video	Nominated
Juno Award	2010	Best New Group	Nominated
MuchMusic Video Award	2010	Best Independent Video	Nominated
Edmonton Music Awards	2012	Album of the Year	Nominated
Edmonton Music Awards	2012	Group of the Year	Won
Edmonton Music Awards	2012	Rock Album of the Year	Nominated
Edmonton Music Awards	2012	People's Choice	Nominated
Juno Awards	2013	Music DVD of The Year	Nominated
