= Daggermouth =

Canadian band

- Origin: Vancouver, British Columbia, Canada
- Genres: Pop punk
- Years active: 2004–present
- Label: Smallman
- Members: Nick Leadlay; Kenny Lush; Dana W.R. Edwards; Dan Donald; Stuart McKillop
- Past members: Kenny Lush; Stuart McKillop; Erik Nielsen; Dan Donald; Jarod Moschenross; Dana W.R. Edwards; Jonathan Heath; Tom Hillifer; Shayne Lundberg; Nick Leadlay

Daggermouth was a Canadian pop punk band that formed in 2004 in Vancouver, British Columbia. They started around early 2004 and toured with bands such as Moneen and SNFU. They broke up in 2008 and returned for a reunion in 2018.

== History ==
Daggermouth consisted of Nick Leadlay (vocals, formerly of the band Playboy Assassin), Kenny Lush (guitar, formerly of The Retreads), Stuart McKillop (guitar and vocals, formerly of End This Week With Knives), Erik Nielsen (bass), and Dan Donald (drums). Past members include drummer J.J. Heath and bass player Dana W.R. Edwards who now play in Vancouver based band Carpenter. Jarod Moschenross and Tom Hillifer also filled in on bass at certain points in time.

The band's sound is characterized by melodic vocals combined with pop-punk guitar riffs and basslines but with a more hardcore feel. Their name is a reference to a robotic fish from the Family Guy episode "A Fish Out of Water".

They signed to Feeding Frenzy Records in July 2005; the following month they recorded their debut album, which was expected for release later in the year. In February 2006, they signed to State of Mind Recordings, who planned to re-issue the album later in the year. In August 2006, the band embarked on a US tour, leading up to the September 2006 recording of their next album. In October and November 2006, the band went on a Canadian tour. Following this, "You Do This as a Fad" and "Fact Mike Peecher" from their forthcoming album were posted online.

In February 2007, the band signed to Smallman Records in Canada, who were aware of the band since late 2005. Turf Wars was released on March 1, 2007; it was promoted with a West Coast tour throughout the month, and another with This Is Hell, Comeback Kid, and Hostage Life. They toured Canada alongside Set Your Goals, No Trigger, and Hostage Life. Between June and August 2007, the band toured Canada and the US; the latter was accompanied by Dead Hearts, Seventh Star and Soldiers. In September 2007, they went on an East Coast US tour with I Am the Avalanche; a second leg was held in November and December 2007. In February 2008, the band went on a West Coast US tour, leading into a cross-country tour supporting Comeback Kid. Leadlay left because of mental health issues and was temporarily replaced; the rest of the band ended up dropping off the tour amidst "a whole slew of personal and financial reasons". By May 2008, they were in the process of writing new material. In November 2008, Leadlay officially announced their indefinite hiatus via a Myspace blog:

Is Daggermouth over? Yes and no: Yes in the sense that right now we aren't playing shows/touring. We may not tour for a long time, if ever again to be honest. Will we ever play a show again? I don't know. The more time that passes the more I hope we do. I really would love to roll out to LA and SF and play some shows like the old days. Hell, lets bring it back to where we started and get Heads Up to play a back yard show with us in Pomona!!! At this point it's hard to tell. The one thing that is a definite possibility though is making a new record. I know that may not be enough for some of you and I understand that. But at this point for health reasons, for myself as well as some of the other members of Daggermouth it may be all we can offer. I miss making music and that's why we all start bands anyway is to make songs we are stoked on.

Shortly after the breakup, Turf Wars was pressed on vinyl by Animal Style Records. The band says there is an album's worth of material demoed. Stu has since been involved in a number of projects and continues to record bands. Members of the band formed Rust Belt Lights with other members of Dead Hearts and Get Back Up; similarly, members formed Downtime with others from Go It Alone. McKillop formed In Bear Country in August 2009; they posted some songs on Myspace and played a few shows the following month. Dan has also continued playing in other bands and is currently drumming for Winnipeg, MB based pop punk band, Elder Abuse. Kenny has become a professional wrestler and has toured Japan and Korea numerous times competing. In October 2016 video surface of past members playing "Lassies Last Dance" sparking rumours of a reunion. In January the band confirmed that it is reuniting for Pouzza Fest in Montreal. March 2018 they announced their return with the release of their single "Ramen Noodle Doodle". Currently Kenny and Dana have formed new band named Rest Easy

== Discography ==
| Year | Album | Label |
|---|---|---|
| 2006 | Stallone | State of Mind |
| 2007 | Turf Wars | State of Mind |
