= Collective Arts Brewing =

Brewery in Hamilton, Ontario, Canada

- Industry: Alcoholic beverage
- Founder: Matt Johnston and Bob Russell
- Headquarters: Hamilton, Ontario
- Area served: Canada, USA, Italy, France, Spain, Sweden, and Australia and Costa Rica
- Products: Beer
- Website: collectiveartsbrewing.com

Collective Arts Brewing is a craft brewery in Hamilton, Ontario, Canada, founded by Matt Johnston and Bob Russell. It is a grassroots craft brewery whose mandate is to combine "the craft of brewing with the inspired talents of emerging and seasoned artists, musicians, photographers & filmmakers".

== Beers ==
Beer brewing is headed by brewmaster Ryan Morrow, producing 6 craft beers that are available year-round, in addition to multiple seasonal brews. They produce a variety of different brews, including the Ransack the Universe India Pale Ale, World Beer Cup winning Stranger than Fiction Porter, and their Rhyme & Reason Extra Pale Ale. The brewery also produces their "Collective Project" which features different seasonal beers created by the brewmasters and cider in two flavours.

The company's Audio/Visual Lager publicizes independent musicians with special limited edition band-themed cans, rotating every few months to promote a new selection of four artists.

Collective Arts products are available across Canada in a variety of retailers including the LCBO in Ontario. Products also available in the Northeast USA states; Connecticut, Massachusetts, Michigan, New Jersey, New York, Maine, New Hampshire, Vermont, and Illinois. Collective Arts also ships beer to Italy, Japan, Spain, Sweden and to Melbourne, Australia.

== Art initiatives ==
Collective Arts Brewing invites artists and musicians to submit their work in bi-yearly Calls for Art. Since the first art and music call in May 2013, over 16,000 submissions have been received from artists and musicians representing over 40 countries. Art and music is chosen by guest curators. Each artist is paid to appear on the labels. Collective Arts does not own the art but is allowed to use it on cans and bottles for a limited period of time. To date, Collective Arts Brewing have produced and compensated over 650 artists and musicians for appearing on limited edition cans and bottle labels.

The company also features all of the artists and musicians on their website, including "The Black Box Sessions" in partnership with Indie88 Studios, showcasing Indie and Alternative artists.

== Brewery ==
In 2014, Collective Arts Brewing leased the former Lakeport Brewing facility from the Hamilton Port Authority.

Collective Arts built a co operative brewery with Nickel Brook Brewing in 2014. Collective Arts purchased Nickel Brooks shares in the brewery in August 2017.

== Gin ==
In 2019, Collective Arts Distilling launched a flagship Artisanal Dry Gin, and a seasonal Rhubarb and Hibiscus Gin. Both Artisanal, and Rhubarb and Hibiscus won silver medals at the 2019 San Francisco World Spirits Competition.

== See also ==
- List of breweries in Canada
- North End, Hamilton
