= Attack in Black =

Canadian indie rock band

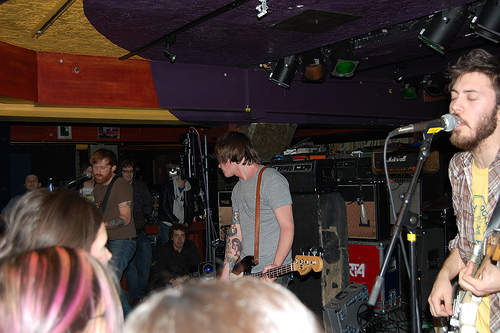
- Attack in Black performing in 2006

Background information
- Origin: Welland, Ontario, Canada
- Genres: Hardcore punk (early); indie rock; folk rock
- Years active: 2003–2010
- Labels: Skate Ahead; Dine Alone; You've Changed Records
- Members: Daniel Romano; Ian Romano; Spencer Burton; Ian Kehoe
- Past members: Matt Ellis; Aaron Murphy; Kendra Foord
- Website: myspace.com/attackinblack

Attack in Black was a Canadian indie rock band from Welland, Ontario, formed in 2003, whose music evolved from Hardcore punk to indie rock and folk rock.

== History ==
Attack in Black began by playing hardcore punk shows and opening for bands such as Death by Stereo, Every Time I Die, Built to Spill and Billy Talent. They already had a following in the Welland area, having performed in other acts prior to Attack in Black's formation.

== 2004–2005: Attack in Black ==
The original band was Ian Romano (drums, percussion), his brother Daniel Romano (vocals, lead guitar), guitarist Spencer Burton, and bassist Aaron Murphy. Murphy soon quit and was replaced by another Welland-area musician Matthew Ellis, and the band recorded a self-titled EP for Grimsby, Ontario label Skate Ahead Records, which released it in 2004. Ellis did not stay in the band long, and was replaced by bassist and singer Ian Kehoe, who had previously been in a band with Burton. Kehoe took on the job of writing most of the lyrics for the band. Solo artist Kendra Foord played keyboards briefly, leaving shortly before they toured western Canada due to creative differences.

== 2006: Widows, Northern Towns ==
Closely following the lineup change, Attack in Black toured to the west coast of Canada. Upon their return, they spoke with promoter Joel Carriere, who had just founded Dine Alone Records. They were signed in early 2006; the four-song Widows EP was released September 16, 2006. Shortly after that, they released the EP Northern Towns. That fall, they opened for Cancer Bats and Alexisonfire and, in the UK, Bayside.

== 2007: Marriage, The Curve of the Earth ==
In early 2007, the band toured Canada with Sparta and Moneen, then headed to the UK for the Give it a Name Festival.

When the time came to record their first full album, they went to Chemical Sound Studios in Toronto with Ian Blurton for a two-week session (the band's first and last studio and producer experience). Dine Alone said that the record did not meet their standards and the band was sent back to the studio with local producer Dan Weston.

The album, entitled Marriage, was released on July 31, 2007, coinciding with a sold-out launch show at the Horseshoe Tavern in Toronto. Three months later, the band released the self-recorded album The Curve of the Earth. The album was written and recorded over two nights in Spencer Burton's sun room. It was recorded through a two-input tape machine onto an 8-track recorder. Each member of the band sang three songs on the record. It was released on vinyl and digital download only. In 2008 it was released in Germany on the Zeitstrafe label.

While on tour with Ladyhawk and Shotgun Jimmie, "Fall Tour Split" was released. Released on Dine Alone Records on 7" vinyl only, "Fall Tour Split" was three songs by fellow tour-mates Shotgun Jimmie and Ladyhawk.

In 2008, Daniel Romano and Ian Kehoe then teamed up with Constantines guitarist Steve Lambke and founded You've Changed Records. The label's first release was a record by Shotgun Jimmie called Still Jimmie. It was recorded in the band's home studio and features all the members of Attack in Black as Jimmie's backup band. Attack in Black then released the EP Fake Love Songs.

== 2009–2010: Years (by One Thousand Fingertips) ==
The band's third album Years (by One Thousand Fingertips) was released on March 10, 2009. This was followed by a split LP with Baby Eagle, the solo project of Constantines guitarist Steve Lambke, released on You've Changed Records in May 2009. The band members then went their separate ways, with their last show taking place on August 27, 2010 at the Mansion House in St. Catharines, Ontario.

== Post break-up ==
In March 2015, Dine Alone Records released their first EPs on vinyl, entitled The First and Second Efforts of a Band That Died Before You Could Kill Them. In October 2017, Dine Alone re-released Marriage. And in 2018, Dine Alone released Got Live If You're Interested, and re-released (with one new song) Fake Love Songs.

Romano collaborated with Frederick Squire and Julie Doiron on the folk album Daniel, Fred & Julie, released December 1, 2009. He also released a solo album, Workin' for the Music Man, which was supported by a cross-Canada tour with Jason Collett. Since then, he has released at least one solo album nearly every year.

Spencer Burton, who also records under the moniker Grey Kingdom, has also continuously released albums.

Ian Kehoe, aka Marine Dreams, also records annually.

In June 2024, Attack in Black performed two shows as Shotgun Jimmie's backing band to celebrate the 15th anniversary of You've Changed Records. The first at The Casbah in Hamilton, Ontario and the second at The Rex in Welland.

== Discography ==
Date of Release	Title	Label
2005	Attack in Black - EP	Skate Ahead Records
2006	Widows - EP	Dine Alone Records
2007	Northern Towns - EP	Dine Alone Records
2007	Marriage (re-released 2017)	Dine Alone Records
2007	The Curve of the Earth	Dine Alone Records
2008	Fall Tour - Split 7"	Dine Alone Records
2009	Years (by One Thousand Fingertips)	Dine Alone Records
2009	Attack in Black/Baby Eagle - Split EP	You've Changed Records
2009	Fake Love Songs - Cassette	Independent
2015	Attack in Black - EP	Dine Alone Records
2015	The First and Second Efforts of a Band That Died Before You Could Kill Them	Dine Alone Records
2018	Fake Love Songs - EP	Dine Alone Records
2018	Got Live If You're Interested	Dine Alone Records

== Music videos ==
Year	Video	Director
2007	"Young Leaves"	Marc Ricciardelli
2008	"Hunger of the Young"	Marc Ricciardelli
2009	"Liberties"	Marc Ricciardelli
2009	"Half Moon on the City High"	

== Awards ==
Year	Event	Won	Nominated
2007	CASBY Awards	Favourite New Artist, NXNE Favourite New Indie Release (Marriage)	

== See also ==
- Music of Canada
- List of bands from Canada
- Canadian rock
