= Black Box Music =

- Founded: 2004
- Founder: Jason Murray and Ian Stanger
- Distributor: Universal Music Group Canada
- Genre: Pop; rock; alternative; hip-hop; R&B
- Country of origin: Canada
- Location: Mississauga, Ontario

Black Box Music is an independent music and artist development company based out of Mississauga, Ontario, Canada. Originally operating under Black Box Recordings, the company began exclusively as a record label in 2004. It has since expanded to include management and publishing services in recent years, prompting the brand change in 2008. The Black Box Recordings brand now exists as the record label sector of Black Box Music's full-service approach.

== History ==
Established in 2004, Black Box Music is one of Canada's independent music companies with teams in Toronto, Ontario and Los Angeles, California. Black Box Music consists of a record label, artist management, and publishing branches. Black Box Music's artist roster includes SonReal, The Glorious Sons, Justin Nozuka, JUNO-winning JJ Wilde, hip-hop artist Classified, rapper and producer Rich Kidd, The OBGMs, MAGGIE ANDREW, Marina Lin, Kennen, yung sum, Northcote, Young Clancy, and Canadian rock band Glass Tiger frontman Alan Frew.

As Black Box Music's scope expanded, so did company involvement in the careers of signed artists, later leading to the launch of the company in artist management. Over time, Black Box Music's artist management and publishing initiatives have grown to include external artists of various styles and genres that are not signed to the Black Box record label.

== Artists ==
=== Label (current) ===
- SonReal
- The Glorious Sons
- Justin Nozuka
- JJ Wilde
- Kennen
- Marina Lin
- The OBGMs
- yung sum
- Willa

=== Label (alumni) ===
- Rosesdead
- Sydney
- Summer Hero
- Ten Second Epic
- The Fullblast
- The Wolfnote
- Brighter Brightest
- Crash Parallel
- DreamFace
- Living With Lions
- Shad
- The Provincial Archive
- The Wooden Sky
- Classified
- Rich Kidd
- Northcote
- MAGGIE ANDREW
- Young Clancy

=== Management ===
- The Glorious Sons
- JJ Wilde
- Blanco Brown
- Northcote
- Alan Frew of Glass Tiger

== Discography ==
Catalogue number	Artist name	Album name	Release date
BBR001	The Fullblast	Contagious Movement Theory	March 6, 2004
BBR002	Rosesdead	The Relationship Between Music & Numbers	June 4, 2004
BBR003	The Wolfnote	This Is the Getdown	June 4, 2004
BBR004	The Wolfnote	Sacred Bodies	July 28, 2005
BBR005	Sydney	Sydney	September 27, 2005
BBR006	Rosesdead	Stages	March 28, 2006
BBR007	Summer Hero	Soundcanvas	August 5, 2006
BBR008	Ten Second Epic	Count Yourself In	October 10, 2006
BBR009	Living with Lions	Dude Manor EP	September 18, 2007
BBR010	Sydney	When We Were Safe	October 9, 2007
BBR011	Shad	The Old Prince	October 16, 2007
BBR012	The Wooden Sky	When Lost at Sea	February 26, 2008
BBR013	Living with Lions	Make Your Mark	June 17, 2008
BBR014	Ten Second Epic	Hometown	January 27, 2009
BBR015	The Wooden Sky	If I Don't Come Home You'll Know I'm Gone	August 25, 2009
BBR016	Northcote	Borrowed Chords, Tired Eyes	December 8, 2009
BBR017	Shad	TSOL	May 25, 2010
BBR018	Lisa Scinta	The Bathroom Sessions EP	August 17, 2010
BBR019	Crash Parallel	Crash Parallel	February 8, 2011
BBR020	Living With Lions	Holy Shit	May 17, 2011
BBR021	Shad	iTunes Session	March 1, 2011
BBR022	Northcote	Gather No Dust	April 19, 2011
BBR023	Brighter Brightest	Right For Me	August 9, 2011
BBR024	Lisa Scinta	Naked EP	August 10, 2011
BBR025	Ten Second Epic	Better Off	September 20, 2011
BBR026	The Wooden Sky	City Of Light EP	October 25, 2011
BBR027	The Wooden Sky	Every Child A Daughter, Every Moon A Sun	February 28, 2012
BBR028	SonReal and Rich Kidd	The Closers	October 16, 2012
BBR029	Livy Jeanne	Under The Radar	November 30, 2012
BBR030	DreamFace	DreamFaceEP	February 26, 2013
BBR031	Northcote	Northcote	May 7, 2013
BBR033	Lyon	Indian Summer	August 20, 2013
BBR034	Shad	Flying Colours	October 15, 2013
BBR035	Kayo	S.L.A.V.E.	September 10, 2013
BBR036	SonReal	Everywhere We Go	August 13, 2013
BBR037	Seas	Fade Out Into The Night	September 24, 2013
BBR038	The Glorious Sons	Shapeless Art	November 19, 2013
	SonReal	One Long Day	January 21, 2014
BBR040a	The Provincial Archive	Hide Like A Secret	June 10, 2014
	Livy Jeanne	We Are The Young	July 8, 2014
BBR040	The Provincial Archive	It's All Shaken Wonder	August 19, 2014
	The Glorious Sons	The Union	September 16, 2014
	Northcote	Invisible Diamonds EP	November 18, 2014
	Rich Kidd	Rich Kidd Nightmares Of Being Rich The LP	December 18, 2014
	Blaq Tuxedo	Red Flowerz EP	January 6, 2015
	SonReal	For The Town	April 28, 2015
	Rich Kidd	Drill God	May 10, 2015
	Livy Jeanne	Dashboard Renegade	July 17, 2015
	Blaq Tuxedo	Limousine EP	September 1, 2015
	Kayo	Nowhere EP	September 11, 2015
	Northcote	Hope Is Made Of Steel	September 24, 2015
	Alan Frew	80290 Rewind	November 6, 2015
	Lyon	Falling Up	September 16, 2016

== Awards and nominations ==
Artist	Award	Year	Category	Status
Ten Second Epic	MuchMusic Video Award	2007	Best Independent Video	Nominated
Ten Second Epic	Canadian Radio Music Award	2008	Rock	Nominated
Ten Second Epic	Canadian Independent Music Awards	2008	Rock Band of the Year	Nominated
Shad	Juno Award	2008	Rap Recording Of The Year	Nominated
Shad	Polaris Music Prize	2008	Short List	Nominated
Shad	CBC Radio 3 Bucky Award	2008	Collaboration Of The Year (w/Hey Ocean!)	Nominated
Shad	CBC Radio 3 Bucky Award	2008	Video Of The Year (The Old Prince...)	Won
Sydney	Hamilton Music Award	2008	Emo Recording Of The Year	Won
Ten Second Epic	MuchMusic Video Award	2009	Best Rock Video	Nominated
Ten Second Epic	Juno Award	2010	Best New Group	Nominated
Shad	Juno Award	2011	Rap Recording Of The Year (TSOL)	Won
Ten Second Epic	Edmonton Music Awards	2012	Album of the Year	Nominated
Ten Second Epic	Edmonton Music Awards	2012	Group of the Year	Won
