= SonReal =

Canadian singer (born 1985)

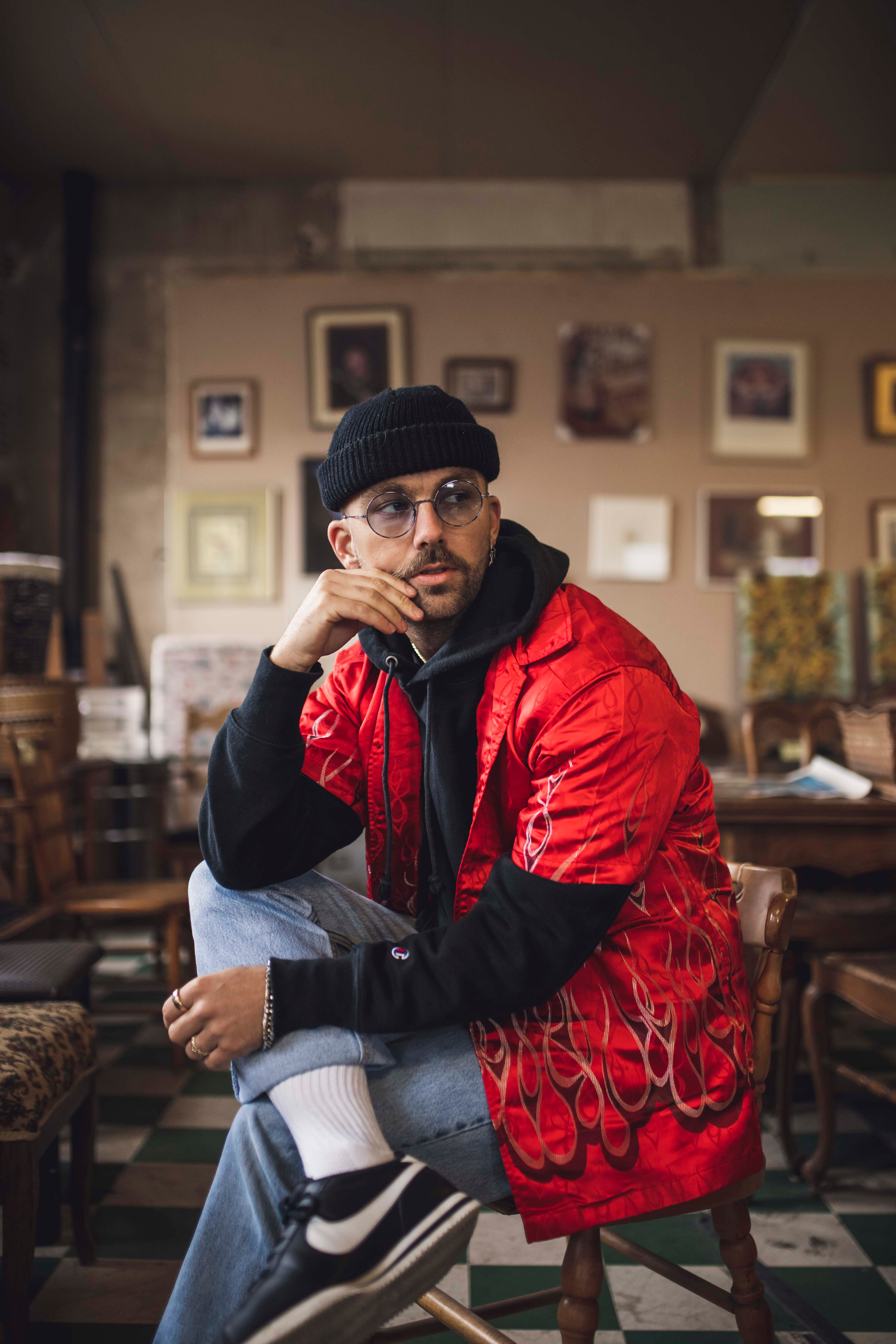
- SonReal 2018

Background information
- Born: Aaron Hoffman; August 16, 1985 (age 41); Vernon, British Columbia, Canada
- Genres: Hip-Hop, Alternative hip hop, Northern hip hop, pop rap
- Occupations: Rapper, singer, songwriter
- Instruments: Vocals, guitar
- Years active: 2004–present
- Labels: The 1851 Recordings, Black Box Recordings
- Website: www.sonreal.com

Aaron Hoffman (born August 16, 1985), better known by his stage name SonReal, is an independent Canadian singer, rapper and songwriter.

== Musical career ==
=== 2006–2012: Early Career and mixtapes ===
SonReal began his career in 2006 with the release of "Trapped in the Streets" (2006), followed by a series of mixtapes he recorded while living in Vancouver, BC. These included: Good Morning (2008), The Stroll (2009),The Lightyear Mixtape (2010), Where's Waldo (2010), Words I Said (2012), Good News (2012), and One Long Day (2014).

2012 also saw the release of The Closers, a collaboration with Toronto's Rich Kidd which was nominated for a Juno Award for Rap Recording of the Year in 2013. It also included the critically acclaimed single "Hometown".

=== 2013–2016: "Everywhere We Go" and EPs ===
In the summer of 2013, SonReal released the single and music video for his song "Everywhere We Go". His subsequent EP, the Juno-nominated For The Town (2015) included the songs "Preach", "For The Town", and "Woah Nilly".

In 2016, SonReal released The Name EP which included the singles "No Warm Up" and "Can I Get a Witness". "Can I Get a Witness" peaked at No. 52 on the Billboard Canadian Hot 100 chart, and was certified Platinum in Canada.

=== 2017–2018: One Long Dream and standalone singles ===
In August 2017, SonReal released his first full-length studio album entitled One Long Dream. Producers on the project include Rahki (known for his work with Kendrick Lamar, Syd, and Mac Miller), Alex Lustig, and the legendary DJ Khalil. This release saw the subsequent music video releases for the singles "Repo Man", "Grammy Song (Live)", "Problems", and "Potential". SonReal made his debut international radio appearance on Sway's Universe in August 2017 to promote the release of his album, which also included a live on-air freestyle during Sway's iconic "5 Fingers of Death" segment.

Following the release of this album SonReal released the song "My Friend" (produced by Kenneth "Babyface" Edmonds and Charlie Handsome) on November 2, 2017. This song is a deeply personal and touching tribute to his late father Glenn Hoffman, who suffered a heart attack while SonReal was on tour in early 2016. A music video for My Friend was also released in November 2017.

In July 2018, SonReal released the single "Have a Nice Day". The quirky music video for "Have a Nice Day" has since been nominated for a Juno Award for Video of the Year in 2019. along with a second nomination for a Prism Prize. The video was directed by Peter Huang and produced by Mad Ruk Entertainment, both of whom have been long time creative partners to SonReal.

== Tours and live appearances ==
SonReal's live shows started coming together in 2008 when he met DJ Rich-A in Vancouver, BC. Together, the pair played live shows across Canada and the US. This would lay the groundwork for what would evolve into SonReal's live show as it is known today.

=== Everywhere We Go Tour (2014) ===
In 2014, SonReal and DJ Rich-A were booked as the opening act on a 53-date tour with Seattle rapper Grieves which exposed him to a new audience of listeners. Previous Canadian domestic tours also included a direct support for Mac Miller's Ontario campus tour in February 2013, a 2014 Canada wide tour as direct support for Down with Webster, and SonReal's own 2014 headlining Everywhere We Go Tour in BC, Ontario, Quebec and the Maritimes. In February 2015 SonReal and DJ Rich-A joined Canadian hip hop artist Classified as direct support on his 26-date national Greatful Tour.

=== For The Town Tour (2015/2016) ===
SonReal kicked off his own North American For The Town tour in Canada in May 2015. This 28-date headlining tour took him through eastern and western Canada as well as the United States. Another key opportunity as an opening act came in 2016 when SonReal headed out with Jon Bellion on an international tour in support of Jon's album The Human Condition in June/ July 2016. It was during The Human Condition Tour that SonReal expanded his live show to include guitar player Joey Resly.

=== No Warm Up Tour (2017) ===
At the top of 2017, SonReal embarked on another 25-date headlining No Warm Up tour throughout Canada and the United States in support of his single No Warm Up and upcoming album One Long Dream. This was the first tour where SonReal added live drums to his band, played by Colanthony Humphrey.

=== One Long Dream Tour (2017) ===
One Long Dream was released globally in August 2017, and SonReal immediately hit the road on a 45 date One Long Dream North American headlining tour in Sept – Dec 2017. This tour included DJ Rich-A (DJ, Keys), Colanthony Humphrey (Drums), Peter Huang (Guitar). This tour continued into early 2018 with 19 more dates being added in North America in Feb/ March 2018. In addition to this tour SonReal also performed at the SiriusXM Kickoff Show at the CFL's 105th Grey Cup on November 26, 2017, in Ottawa, Canada.

=== SonReal Goes Sightseeing Tour (2018) ===
Having gained a large fan base touring North America over the last 4 years, SonReal took his live performance to Europe for the first time in Oct/Nov 2018. This included shows in Germany, Belgium, Netherlands, UK, Ireland, and Denmark as part of his SonReal Goes Sightseeing Tour in support of One Long Dream and his 2018 singles.

== Discography ==
=== Studio albums ===
- One Long Dream (2017)
- The Aaron LP (2019)
- Nobody's Happy All the Time (2022)
- All Things Aside (2024)
- Here Goes Nothing (2026)

=== EPs ===
- For The Town (2015)
- The Name (2016)
- I Can't Make This Up (2021)

=== Mixtapes ===
- Trapped in the Streets (2006)
- Good Morning (2008)
- The Stroll (2009)
- Where's Waldo (2010)
- The Lightyear Mixtape (2010)
- Words I Said (2012)
- The Closers (with Rich Kidd) (2012)
- Good News (2012)
- One Long Day (2014)

== Awards and nominations ==
Year	Ceremony	Nominee/Work	Award	Result
2013	IHeartRadio Much Music Video Awards	"Hometown”	Hip Hop Video of the Year	Nominated
2013	Juno Award	The Closers	Rap Recording of the Year	Nominated
2014	Juno Award	"Everywhere We Go”	Rap Recording of the Year	Nominated
2014	IHeartRadio Much Music Video Awards	"Everywhere We Go”	Video of the Year	Nominated
2014	IHeartRadio Much Music Video Awards	"Everywhere We Go”	Director of the Year (Director: Peter Huang)	Nominated
2014	IHeartRadio Much Music Video Awards	"Everywhere We Go”	Hip Hop Video of the Year	Nominated
2014	IHeartRadio Much Music Video Awards	"Everywhere We Go”	MuchFact Video of the Year	Won
2014	IHeartRadio Much Music Video Awards	"Everywhere We Go”	Viewers Choice Video of the Year	Nominated
2015	IHeartRadio Much Music Video Awards	"For The Town”	Best Post-Production	Nominated
2015	IHeartRadio Much Music Video Awards	"Preach”	Best Hip Hop Video	Nominated
2015	Juno Award	"Preach”	Best Hip Hop Video	Nominated
2016	IHeartRadio Much Music Video Awards	"Whoa Nilly”	Best Hip Hop Video	Nominated
2016	IHeartRadio Much Music Video Awards	"Whoa Nilly”	Best MuchFACT Video	Nominated
2019	Juno Award	"Have a Nice Day"	Video of the Year	Nominated
