= Busting Visions =

Studio album by Zeus
- Released: March 27, 2012
- Recorded: Ill Eagle Studios, Toronto
- Genres: Indie rock, alternative rock
- Length: 44:07
- Label: Arts & Crafts Productions
- Producer: Zeus

Zeus chronology
Say Us (2010)	Busting Visions (2012)	Classic Zeus (2014)

Busting Visions is the second studio album from the Canadian Alternative Rock band Zeus. On April 2, 2013, the band released a Deluxe Edition of the album, which added their 'Cover Me' EP, a collection of 7 covers by Zeus, to the end of the album.

== Critical reception ==
Professional ratings
Aggregate scores
Source	Rating
Metacritic	70/100
Review scores
Source	Rating
AllMusic	4/5 stars
The A.V. Club	B−
Beats per Minute	51%
Consequence of Sound	C+
Prefix Mag	(6.5/10)

Busting Visions was met with "generally favorable" reviews from critics. At Metacritic, which assigns a weighted average rating out of 100 to reviews from mainstream publications, this release received an average score of 70, based on 9 reviews.

== Track listing ==
All songs written and composed by Zeus (Rob Drake, Carlin Nicholson, Mike O'Brien, Neil Quin) except where noted.

No.	Title	Music	Length
1.	"Are You Gonna Waste My Time"	Zeus	2:36
2.	"Love/Pain"	Zeus	2:56
3.	"Anything You Want Dear"	Zeus	3:40
4.	"Let It Go, Don't Let It Go"	Zeus	3:33
5.	"Strong Mind"	Zeus	4:48
6.	"Bright Brown Opus"	Zeus	0:56
7.	"Love In a Game"	Zeus	3:17
8.	"With Eyes Closed"	Zeus	3:50
9.	"Hello, Tender Love"	Zeus	4:36
10.	"Messenger's Way"	Zeus	2:56
11.	"Proud and Beautiful"	Zeus	1:14
12.	"Stop the Train"	Zeus	3:24
13.	"Cool Blue (And the Things You Do)"	Zeus	4:02
14.	"Now That I've Got You"	Zeus	2:33
Total length:			44:07

Deluxe Edition
No.	Title	Music	Length
15.	"Who Is It?"	Michael Jackson	4:03
16.	"Vasoline"	Robert DeLeo, Dean DeLeo, Eric Kretz	2:43
17.	"The Ballad of El Goodo"	Chris Bell, Alex Chilton	4:38
18.	"Ignition (Remix)"	R. Kelly	3:30
19.	"That's All"	Phil Collins, Tony Banks, Mike Rutherford	3:15
20.	"Without a Map"	Sam Roberts	4:01
21.	"Fight Test"	Wayne Coyne, Steven Drozd, Michael Ivins, Dave Fridmann, Cat Stevens	4:59
Total length:			1:08:31

== Personnel ==
- Rob Drake – Drums
- Carlin Nicholson – vocals, guitar, bass, keyboards
- Mike O'Brien – vocals, guitar, bass, keyboards
- Neil Quin - vocals, guitar, bass, keyboards

== Additional musicians ==
- Afie Jurvanen, Taylor Knox, Jessica Grassia, Dave Azzolini, Liam Nicholson, Jason Collett, Mika Posen, Alex McMaster, and Bryden Baird
- 'Love In A Game' also features voices of: Jay McCarol, Krista Nicholson, Meggy Messing, and Danielle Duval
