= ...And the Ever Expanding Universe =

Studio album by the Most Serene Republic
- Released: July 14, 2009
- Genre: Indie rock
- Label: Arts & Crafts
- Producer: David Newfeld

The Most Serene Republic chronology
Population (2007)	...And the Ever Expanding Universe (2009)	Fantasick Impossibliss (2010)

Professional ratings
Review scores
Source	Rating
AllMusic	4/5 stars
The A.V. Club	B+
Pitchfork	(6.5/10)
PopMatters	8/10 stars

...And the Ever Expanding Universe is the third studio album by Canadian indie rock band the Most Serene Republic, released on July 14, 2009. The album title, track listing, and release date were all revealed by the band through their Arts & Crafts label on April 20, 2009. The album was produced and mixed by David Newfeld who also cowrites and performs on the release.

== Track listing ==
No.	Title	Length
1.	"Bubble Reputation"	3:09
2.	"Heavens to Purgatory"	2:39
3.	"Vessels of a Donor Look"	2:55
4.	"Phi"	3:39
5.	"The Old Forever New Things"	2:56
6.	"All of One Is the Other"	3:09
7.	"Patternicity"	5:51
8.	"Four Humours"	3:08
9.	"Catharsis Boo"	4:07
10.	"Don't Hold Back, Feel a Little Longer"	3:54
11.	"No One Likes a Nihilist"	3:56
