= Digital Population =

Digital Population - Digital Download Only EP

EP by the Most Serene Republic
- Released: 2009
- Genre: Indie
- Label: Arts & Crafts
- Producer: Ryan Lenssen

Digital Population is an EP released by the Most Serene Republic on Arts & Crafts. It contains 5 tracks from Population that were remixed as 16 Bit versions. It was released as a digital download only on April 28, 2009.

== Track list ==
1. "Humble Peasants" (16-bit version)
2. "Compliance" (16-bit version)
3. "The Men Who Live Upstairs" (16-bit version)
4. "Present of Future End" (16-bit version)
5. "Sherry and Her Butterfly Net" (16-bit version)
