= Timber Timbre (album) =

Studio album by Timber Timbre
- Released: January 13, 2009
- Genre: Blues, folk
- Length: 36:20
- Label: Out of This Spark, Arts & Crafts
- Producer: Chris Stringer

Timber Timbre chronology
Medicinals (2007)	Timber Timbre (2009)	Creep on Creepin' On (2011)

Professional ratings
Review scores
Source	Rating
AllMusic	3/5 stars
ChartAttack	4/5 stars
Consequence of Sound	4.5/5 stars
Drowned in Sound	5/10

Timber Timbre is the third studio album from Timber Timbre, released January 13, 2009 on Out of This Spark in Canada.

It was rereleased on June 30, 2009 in both Canada and the United States, and August 17, 2009 in the United Kingdom, on Arts & Crafts. Considered to be a successful follow-up to the smaller scale previous LPs which garnered a minute but faithful following, the album was a long list nominee for the 2009 Polaris Music Prize and the song "Lay Down in the Tall Grass" has been shortlisted for SOCAN'S ECHO prize. Toronto's Eye Weekly called the album 'the spookiest disc of the year, and the best'.

For the week of Halloween 2009, the album was released for free from the band's website.

The song "Demon Host" was used for the 2012 documentary film Stories We Tell. The song "Magic Arrow" is featured briefly on Breaking Bad's third season, in the episode "Caballo sin Nombre."

== Track listing ==
All songs written by Taylor Kirk.

No.	Title	Length
1.	"Demon Host"	3:37
2.	"Lay Down in the Tall Grass"	5:36
3.	"Until the Night is Over"	3:58
4.	"Magic Arrow"	6:04
5.	"We'll Find Out"	2:38
6.	"I Get Low"	5:10
7.	"Trouble Comes Knocking"	5:26
8.	"No Bold Villain"	3:51

== Personnel ==
- Taylor Kirk - written, performed, recorded by
- Chris Stringer - producer; percussion, banjo, keyboards
- Misha Bower - vocals
- Matt Cully - vocals
- Neil Haverty - vocals
- Steve Mackay - vocals
- Mika Posen - strings
- Chris Hickey - screams
- Christienne Chesney - words
- Michael Milosh - words
