= Wisecrack (album) =

Studio album by Haley Blais
- Released: 15 September 2023
- Studio: Protection Island (Maple Ridge)
- Genres: Independent music; Folk-pop
- Length: 42:41
- Label: Arts & Crafts
- Producers: David Vertesi; Jonathan Anderson

Haley Blais chronology
Below the Salt (2020)	Wisecrack (2023)

Wisecrack is an independent folk-pop album by Canadian singer-songwriter Haley Blais, released on 15 September 2023 by Arts & Crafts. Blais began writing songs for the album in early 2020 and completed recording in the summer of 2022. Blais released several singles and music videos in the lead-up to the album.

Wisecrack was inspired by 1990s and early 2000s indie music and touches on themes of nostalgia, childhood, family and morality. The album has received generally positive reviews, with critics stating that the album shows Blais's growth as a musician, and praising it for its lyrics and production, as well as Blais's vocals.

== Background and recording ==
Blais released her debut album, Below the Salt, in August 2020. Blais said that she produced the album without thinking about its "cohesive[ness]". By contrast, she said that she was deliberate and careful about writing and releasing Wisecrack, which she started working on in early 2020.

Blais recorded Wisecrack at Protection Island Studio in Maple Ridge, British Columbia. David Vertesi of Hey Ocean! and Jonathan Anderson produced the album. It was completed in 2022. Blais released several singles and music videos leading up to the album's release, including "Coolest Fucking Bitch in Town" and "Survivor's Guilt" in 2022, and "Matchmaker", "Baby Teeth", and "The Cabin" in 2023. In May 2023, she signed with Canadian record label Arts & Crafts and announced a limited summer tour. Wisecrack was released on CD, LP, and as a digital release on 15 September 2023 by Arts & Crafts.

== Composition and themes ==
Wisecrack is an independent album that has been described as folk-pop. The album is titled after a lyric from the track "Baby Teeth". It was inspired by the indie music of the 1990s and early 2000s; Blais and the producers said that they wanted the album to sound both "old and new at the same time". Blais said that the album is "like a diary entry about growing older and saying goodbye to what you thought family was". Critics have noted that the album addresses themes of nostalgia, childhood, family, and morality. In The Georgia Straight, Mike Usinger wrote that the moral of the album is "Sometimes you end up working things out, even if you're not aware of it." Ljubinko Zivkovic in Spill said that the album is about Blais's attempt to find new family while her parents were ending their relationship.

== Critical reception ==
Professional ratings
Review scores
Source	Rating
The Line of Best Fit	8/10
The Spill Magazine	4/5 stars

Wisecrack received positive reviews. Critics have said that the album exhibits Blais's growth as an artist and they have praised its lyrics, vocals, and production. For The Line of Best Fit, Lana Williams rated the album eight out of ten. She praised the album's melodies and said that the lyrics were "dynamic and self-depreciating". Usinger in The Georgia Straight praised several of Wisecrack's tracks, highlighting her use of multitracked and manipulated vocals. He wrote that "her songs [are] spiked with left-field moments of jagged majesty". Writing for Exclaim!, Heather Taylor-Singh said that the album "has achieved both lyrical and sonic cohesion". Zivkovic in Spill rated the album four out of five stars and said that Blais's delicate and light voice and lyrics, along with "intricate arrangements", made the album relatable to and delightful for listeners. The album was longlisted for the 2024 Polaris Music Prize.

== Track listing ==
All tracks are written by Haley Blais.

No.	Title	Length
1.	"Soft Spot for Monarchs"	2:39
2.	"Survivor's Guilt"	3:30
3.	"Coolest Fucking Bitch in Town"	4:56
4.	"Reset Button"	3:12
5.	"Matchmaker"	3:47
6.	"Concrete"	3:09
7.	"The Cabin"	3:57
8.	"Baby Teeth"	3:34
9.	"Body"	5:18
10.	"Winner"	4:05
11.	"Beginner's Guide to Birdwatching"	4:29
Total length:		42:41

== Personnel ==
Credits are from the artist's official Bandcamp page for the album.

- Haley Blais – vocals, acoustic guitar, Wurlitzer, bass organ, percussion, bells, string programming (on "Beginner’s Guide To Birdwatching")
- David Vertesi – producer, engineering, horn arrangements, acoustic guitar, electric guitar, bass guitar, dobro, piano, keyboards, organ, synth, vocals, percussion, hammered dulcimer, drums (on "Soft Spots for Monarchs")
- Jonathan Anderson – producer, engineering, mixing, electric guitar, acoustic guitar, bass guitar, slide guitar, pedal steel guitar, banjo, dobro, piano, keyboard
- Philip Shaw Bova – mastering
- Johnny Andrews – drums (on all tracks except "Soft Spots for Monarchs")
- Malcolm Aiken – trumpet, French horn, trombone (on "Survivor's Guilt" and "Coolest Fucking Bitch in Town")
- Elisa Thorn – harp (on "Concrete")
