= Sounds Like Zeus =

EP by Zeus
- Released: 2 June 2009
- Recorded: 2009
- Genre: Indie rock
- Length: 15:45
- Language: English
- Label: Arts & Crafts
- Producer: Zeus

Zeus chronology
Sounds Like Zeus (2009)	Say Us (2010)

Singles from Sounds Like Zeus
- 1. "Marching Through Your Head"; 2. "How Does It Feel"

Sounds Like Zeus is the debut EP by Canadian indie band Zeus. It was released 2 June 2009 on the Arts & Crafts label. The EP was recorded at Ill Eagle Studio and mixed at The Cracker Pit.

The EP includes a cover of the Genesis song "That's All".

In a positive review of the EP, critic Vish Khanna called the band "one of the sunniest additions to the Arts & Crafts roster", and wrote that "'Marching Through Your Head' is a strong contender for pop song of the year." Graham Kennedy of Chart magazine listed the EP among his top ten favourite albums of 2009.

== Track listing ==
All songs written by Zeus (Rob Drake, Carlin Nicholson, Mike O'Brien, Neil Quin) except where noted.

1. "How Does It Feel" – 2:52
2. "Marching Through Your Head" – 2:25
3. "I Know" – 3:15
4. "That's All" (Tony Banks, Phil Collins, Mike Rutherford) – 3:15
5. "Cornerstones" – 3:56

== Personnel ==
- Rob Drake
- Carlin Nicholson
- Mike O'Brien
- Neil Quin
- Chris Marshall – photography
- Robbie Lackritz – mixing
- Phil Bova – mastering
