= Hot Dreams =

Studio album by Timber Timbre
- Released: March 31, 2014
- Studios: Banff Centre (Banff, Alberta); Hotel2Tango (Montreal)
- Length: 42:59
- Label: Arts & Crafts
- Producers: Taylor Kirk; Simon Trottier

Timber Timbre chronology
Creep on Creepin' On (2011)	Hot Dreams (2014)	Sincerely, Future Pollution (2017)

Hot Dreams is the fifth studio album by Canadian band Timber Timbre, released on March 31, 2014 on Arts & Crafts. The album was a shortlisted nominee for the 2014 Polaris Music Prize.

== Production ==
Frontman Taylor Kirk left Ontario for Los Angeles to write the album and was inspired by his surroundings in the Laurel Canyon. Not writing alone anymore – as they had on previous albums – the group focused more on a rock and roll trajectory with the new album, also making heavy use of vintage synthesizers and the mellotron. The album was produced by Kirk and Simon Trottier. It was engineered by Graham Lessard at Banff Centre in Banff, Alberta and at Hotel2Tango in Montreal. Additional recordings were done by Trottier at the National Music Centre in Calgary and in Hull, Quebec with Olivier Fairfield.

== Critical reception ==
Professional ratings
Aggregate scores
Source	Rating
Metacritic	80/100
Review scores
Source	Rating
AllMusic	5/5 stars
Consequence of Sound	B−
Exclaim!	9/10
The Guardian	5/5 stars
The Independent	4/5 stars
Mojo	4/5 stars
NME	8/10
The Observer	4/5 stars
PopMatters	8/10
Q	3/5 stars

Hot Dreams was released to mostly positive reviews. At Metacritic, which assigns a normalized rating out of 100 to reviews from mainstream critics, the album received an average score of 80, based on 19 reviews, which indicates a "generally favorable" reception.

Heather Phares of AllMusic wrote, "While Hot Dreams is slightly less immediate than Creep on Creepin' On, its potent cocktail of menace, glamour, and vulnerability is nothing less than transporting." Kerry Doole of Exclaim! wrote, "[Kirk] proves himself a master of melancholy, as on the Tindersticks-like "This Low Commotion" and the gentle "Run from Me," but he and his comrades inject enough dynamic range to hold your attention throughout."

== Track listing ==
No.	Title	Length
1.	"Beat the Drum Slowly"	5:29
2.	"Hot Dreams"	4:53
3.	"Curtains?!"	3:43
4.	"Bring Me Simple Men"	3:50
5.	"Resurrection Drive Part II"	2:10
6.	"Grand Canyon"	4:37
7.	"This Low Commotion"	5:06
8.	"The New Tomorrow"	4:04
9.	"Run from Me"	4:16
10.	"The Three Sisters"	4:51
Total length:		42:59

Notes

- "Curtains?!" features words by Simone Schmidt
- "Bring Me Simple Men" features words by Simone Schmidt

== Personnel ==
Musicians

- Taylor Kirk – vocals (1–4, 6–9), drums (1–8, 10), acoustic guitar (1, 2, 6, 9), Novachord (1, 3), piano (2, 6–8, 10), percussion (2–9), electric guitar (2, 3, 6–9), Farfisa organ (3), theremin (6), Mellotron (7), Hammond organ (8)
- Simon Trottier – baritone guitar (all tracks), EBow guitar (1), concert bass drum (1), tubular bells (1, 4, 6, 8, 9), electric guitar (2, 3, 4, 5, 9, 10), vocals (3, 8), acoustic guitar (4), Marxophone (4, 6, 9), lap steel guitar (5, 7), Mellotron (5), EBow lap steel guitar (6, 10), chains (6, 9), percussion (10)
- Mika Posen – strings (1, 2, 4–10), vocals (9, 10)
- Mathieu Charbonneau – Mellotron (1, 10), Vox Continental (1), Chamberlin M1 (2, 6), Novachord (3, 5, 8), harpsichord (4, 5, 7, 10), piano (4, 9), Farfisa organ (7), Wurlitzer electronic piano (8)
- Olivier Fairfield – tape machine (1, 10), synthesizer (1, 6, 10), Fender Rhodes piano (2, 5), drums (5, 9), Hohner Pianet (5), electric guitar (5), Hammond organ (9)
- Mark Lawson – drum synthesizer
- Colin Stetson – C melody saxophone (2, 6, 10), tenor saxophone (2), bass saxophone (2, 5, 6, 8, 10), baritone saxophone (5, 8)
- Romy Lightman – vocals (2, 9)

Technical

- Taylor Kirk – production
- Simon Trottier – production, additional recording
- Graham Lessard – engineering
- Ben Oegema – assistant engineering
- Mark Lawson – mixing
- Harris Newman – mastering

Packaging

- Robyn Kotyk – layout
- Taylor Kirk – layout, cover photograph
- Laura Margaret Ramsey – insert photograph
