= Underwater Cinematographer =

Studio album by The Most Serene Republic
- Released: 2004 (Sunday League); July 12, 2005 (Arts & Crafts)
- Genre: Indie
- Label: Sunday League; Arts & Crafts
- Producer: Ryan Lenssen

The Most Serene Republic chronology
Underwater Cinematographer (2004)	Phages (EP) (2006)

Professional ratings
Review scores
Source	Rating
Allmusic	4/5 stars
Pitchfork Media	(6.8/10)

Underwater Cinematographer is the 2005 debut album by The Most Serene Republic.

== Track listing ==
All songs written by The Most Serene Republic. Lyrics by Adrian Jewett.

1. "Prologue"
2. "Content Was Always My Favorite Colour"
3. "(Oh) God"
4. "The Protagonist Suddenly Realizes What He Must Do in the Middle of Downtown Traffic"
5. "Proposition 61"
6. "Where Cedar Nouns and Adverbs Walk"
7. "In Places, Empty Spaces"
8. "Relative's Eyes"
9. "King of No One"
10. "You're a Loose Cannon McArthur...But You Get the Job Done"
11. "Epilogue"
