= Creep on Creepin' On =

Studio album by Timber Timbre
- Released: April 5, 2011
- Studios: Petite Église (Farnham, Quebec); Treatment Room (Montreal)
- Length: 39:28
- Label: Arts & Crafts
- Producer: Timber Timbre

Timber Timbre chronology
Timber Timbre (2009)	Creep on Creepin' On (2011)	Hot Dreams (2014)

Professional ratings
Aggregate scores
Source	Rating
Metacritic	74/100
Review scores
Source	Rating
AllMusic	4/5 stars
NME	7/10
Pitchfork	6.7/10
PopMatters	6/10

Creep on Creepin' On is the fourth studio album by Timber Timbre, released on April 5, 2011, on Arts & Crafts. The album was recorded in a variety of locations, including a converted church.

The album was supported by a variety of concert dates in Ontario, Quebec and New York. It debuted at #21 on the Canadian Albums Chart, and was a shortlisted nominee for the 2011 Polaris Music Prize.

Kirk described the album as "...a certain effort to be obscure and dark and scary and kind of menacing ... and it was almost to the point of kitsch, but not... there was an awareness and irony about it, almost to the point of it being a Halloween doo-wop mix tape or something — Monster Mash kind of shit."

== Track listing ==
All music composed and arranged by Timber Timbre.

No.	Title	Length
1.	"Bad Ritual"	3:07
2.	"Obelisk"	1:53
3.	"Creep on Creepin' On"	3:59
4.	"Black Water"	5:59
5.	"Swamp Magic"	3:01
6.	"Woman"	3:51
7.	"Too Old to Die Young"	4:51
8.	"Lonesome Hunter"	4:43
9.	"Do I Have Power"	4:31
10.	"Souvenirs"	3:33
Total length:		39:28

== Personnel ==
- Taylor Kirk – vocals, drums, percussion, electric guitar, baritone guitar, piano, cover photo
- Simon Trottier – electric guitar, baritone guitar, lap steel guitar, autoharp, percussion, vocals
- Mika Posen – violin, vocals
- Mathieu Charbonneau – piano, harpsichord, organ
- Colin Stetson – C-melody saxophone, tenor saxophone, baritone saxophone, bass saxophone, bass clarinet
- Katherine Peacock – accordion
- Mark Lawson – recording, mixing
- Kees Dekker – recording
- Harris Newman – mastering
- Nina Nielsen – sleeve photo
- Robyn Kotyk – layout
