= Oh No Forest Fires =

Canadian indie pop band

- Origin: Brampton, Ontario, Canada
- Genres: Indie pop, math rock
- Years active: 2007–2010
- Label: Independent
- Past members: Rajiv Thavanathan; Brock Swanek; Matt Del Buono; Adam Nimmo

Oh No Forest Fires was a Canadian indie pop band from Toronto and nearby Brampton, Ontario, formed in 2007 and disbanded in 2010. The group's members were singer-guitarist Rajiv Thavanathan, guitarist-singer Brock Swanek, bassist Matt Del Buono, and drummer Adam Nimmo.

== History ==
Rajiv Thavanathan, formerly of the band Five Blank Pages, started the group along with Adam Nimmo, the drummer from The Most Serene Republic. They recorded some demos, and then Matt Del Buono and Brock Swanek joined. Swanek was previously in the band Fox Jaws. Initially the group was called "Forest Fires", but they determined that the name was "too safe". Nimmo suggested "Oh No" but they soon discovered it was already the name of an American rapper. They then put the two names together.

Oh No Forest Fires' 2007 album, The War on Geometry, was produced by Kenny Bridges of the band Moneen. The EP Wants to Try Something was released in 2010.

The band played its final show at the Horseshoe Tavern in Toronto on January 23, 2010.

== Reception ==
In an album review, Chart wrote, "Most of The War On Geometry's songs are pretty strong and combine a nice melange of influences... it's a pretty great debut from a bunch of high-energy guys." Exclaim! wrote in its review, "Canada continues to dish out quality pop rock acts frosted with idiosyncrasies bred in the touch of winter seclusion."

== Members ==
- Rajiv Thavanathan – vocals, guitar
- Brock Swanek – guitar, vocals
- Matt Del Buono – bass guitar, vocals
- Adam Nimmo – drums

== Discography ==
- 2007: The War on Geometry
- 2010: Wants to Try Something
