= Phages (EP) =

Phages - Limited Edition Tour EP

EP by the Most Serene Republic
- Released: 2006
- Genre: Indie
- Label: Arts & Crafts
- Producer: Ryan Lenssen

The Most Serene Republic chronology
Underwater Cinematographer (2005)	Phages - Limited Edition Tour EP (2006)	Population (2007)

Professional ratings
Review scores
Source	Rating
AllMusic	3.5/5 stars

Phages is a 2006 EP by the Most Serene Republic. The artwork depicts downtown Toronto's Yonge and College intersection looking north from the southwest corner in the winter.

Phages has been described as a "transitional record that points the way towards 2007's even more opulent Population, Phages is an important point in The Most Serene Republic catalog on its own merits".

== Track listing ==
1. "Emergency Performance Art Piece" - 2:40
2. "You're Not an Astronaut" - 4:15
3. "Phages" - 5:03
4. "Shopping Cart People" - 2:45
5. "Jazz Ordinaire" - 4:29
6. "Threehead" - 5:09
7. "Anhoi Polloi" - 4:46
8. "Stay Ups" - 3:57

== Personnel ==
- Adrian Jewitt - vocals
- Ryan Lenssen - piano, vocals
- Nick Greaves - guitar
- Andrew McArthur - bass
- Emma Ditchburn - guitar, vocals
- Adam Nimmo - drums
- Sean Woolven - guitar, backing vocal
