= Cascades (EP) =

EP by Jean-Michel Blais and CFCF
- Released: March 15, 2017
- Genres: Ambient; postminimalism; neoclassical
- Length: 30:47
- Label: Arts & Crafts
- Producers: Jean-Michel Blais; CFCF

Jean-Michel Blais chronology
Il (2016)	Cascades (2017)	Dans ma main (2018)

CFCF chronology
On Vacation Remixes (2016)	Cascades (2017)

Singles from Cascades
- 1. "In a Landscape" Released: February 21, 2017

Cascades is a collaborative extended play between electronic musician Michael Silver, known by his stage name CFCF, and neoclassical pianist Jean-Michel Blais. The EP is a set of five post-minimalist ambient re-workings, the first four of them being of original tracks by Blais and CFCF and the final one being a rework of John Cage's "In A Landscape." Released by the label Arts & Crafts on March 15, 2017, Cascades received very positive opinions from professional music critics, a common praise being the "distinct blend of the artists’ digital styles," stated PopMatters.

== History ==
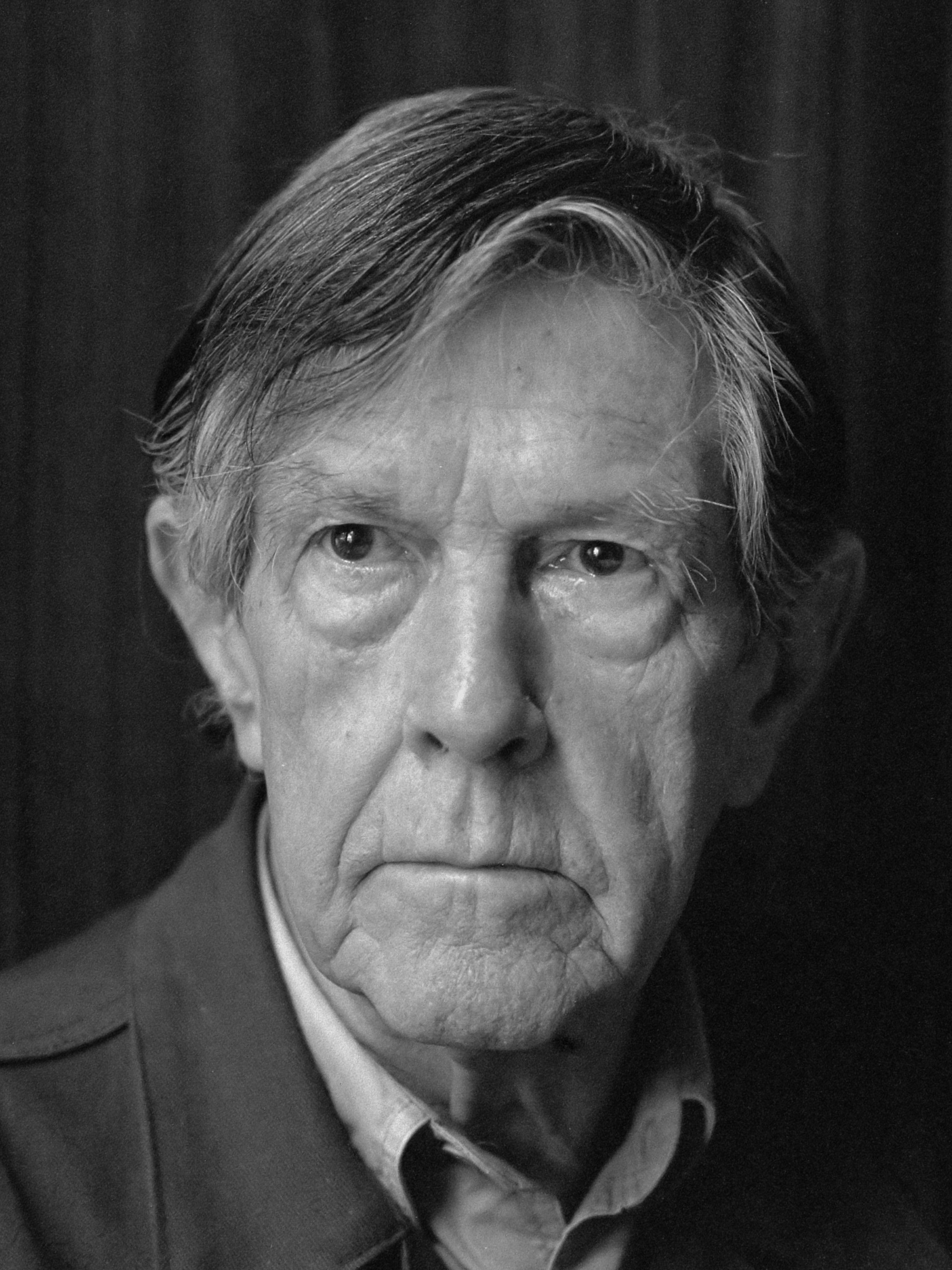
Cascades includes a reworking of the piece "In A Landscape" by John Cage.

In 2016, Red Bull Music Academy planned a live performance collaboration between electronic musician Michael Silver, known by his stage name as CFCF, and neoclassical pianist Jean-Michel Blais, both Canadian musicians. When the two met each other to talk about the performance, Silver and Blais noted they had the same musical influences and almost similar melodic lines, which influenced them to make an extended play together for the performance; Cascades was the result. The making of one of the tracks, a rework of John Cage's "In A Landscape," started with Jean-Michel studying the sheet music of the original piece with initially no intentions of creating a rework. However, he then created a chord progression for the monophonic composition, and Silver and Jean-Michel created a rework of the piece based on Jean-Michel's chord structure. The rework premiered via RBMA Radio on February 21, 2017, and the label Arts & Crafts issued Cascades to digital stores on March 15 and on physical formats on April 14.

== Composition ==
Cascades is a set of improvised post-minimalist ambient piano-and-synthesizer re-workings of five pieces: two tracks originally by Blais ("Hasselblad 1" and "Hypocrite"), two songs originally by CFCF ("Two Mirrors" and "Spirit"), and John Cage's "In A Landscape." Jean-Michel stated that he produced Cascades based on phenomenology: "This idea of repetition, even if it’s the same chord and you’ve heard it for four minutes, it’s not the same chord even if it’s technically the same, your experience to it is different because your mind went somewhere else and it might be affecting you physiologically or just emotionally; it’s changing and touching upon an almost meditative mood." Some writers stated that they had nostalgic feelings when listening to the EP. As Meaghan Garvey wrote, "Immediately, there is something about the way [Michel] plays [the piano], some nameless sense of aching nostalgia for a forgotten memory, that catches in my throat." PopMatters Brian Duricy stated the melodies reminded him of the ambient mixtapes he listened to as a kid.

The first three tracks of Cascades are the reworks of "Hasselblad 1," "Two Mirrors," and "Spirit," which mostly consist of piano with only a few parts of Silver's synthesizer swells. In the first two tracks, it "feels like they're establishing their respective spaces rather than moving as a single unit," but by the third song, "they're clicking, and the record has successfully outlined its parameters," wrote Pitchfork reviewer Andy Beta. “Two Mirrors" revolves around what Beta described as a "repetitive piano line redolent of Philip Glass," as more notes of the higher and lower pitches enter the track. Some reviewers described "Hypocrite" as a trance-style or EDM-like cut. It begins with a simple piano melody before arpeggiated synthesizer riffs play to tense up and drop constantly like an EDM track. The EP ends on a calmer note with "In a Landscape," where the piano is played over a background of radio sound effects, synthesizer strings, flickering electronic sounds, marimbas, and chimes.

== Critical reception ==
Professional ratings
Aggregate scores
Source	Rating
Metacritic	81/100
Review scores
Source	Rating
AllMusic	4/5 stars
Exclaim!	8/10
Pitchfork	7.3/10
Tiny Mix Tapes	4/5 marks

Duricy wrote that many of the critical reviews of Cascades praised the "distinct blend of the artists’ digital styles." Beta opined that it "finds Silver and Blais warily feeling one another other out and then synchronizing to exalted effect by the record's end." Exclaim! also highlighted Blais and Silver's "chemistry," reasoning that "Blais' playing suits very well the pristine and glossy production Silver employed for those recordings, injecting it with a real sense of purpose here." As an AllMusic critic stated, "Both artists are so versatile that such a bombastic neo-trance piece ["Hypocrite"] feels completely at home being followed up by a reworking of Cage's "In a Landscape," which starts out slightly distant and scattered before gradually becoming more detailed and harmonic. Excellent work from both artists." A Tiny Mix Tapes critic wrote that, "For the listener, it’s something too rare these days: an exceedingly pleasant listen, unburdened by the weight of being anything more." Exclaim! ranked the release at number 4 on their Top 11 EPs of 2017 list.

== Track listing ==
Derived from the liner notes of Cascades.

No.	Title	Rework of a piece by	Length
1.	"Hasselblad 1"	Jean-Michel Blais	3:39
2.	"Two Mirrors"	CFCF	5:45
3.	"Spirit"	CFCF	5:20
4.	"Hypocrite"	Jean-Michel Blais	5:13
5.	"In a Landscape"	John Cage	10:50
Total length:			30:47

== Release history ==
Region	Date	Format(s)	Label
Worldwide	March 15, 2017	Digital download	Arts & Crafts
Worldwide	April 14, 2017	Vinyl	Arts & Crafts
