= Comeuppance =

Comeuppance may refer to:

- Comeuppance (film), a 2000 Hong Kong film
- "Comeuppance", a 2014 episode of the TV series House of Lies
- Comeuppance, a record label of Steve Harley
- "Comeuppance", a song by The Most Serene Republic from the EP Fantasick Impossibliss
