= Dans ma main =

Studio album by Jean-Michel Blais
- Released: May 11, 2018
- Genres: Minimal; neoclassical; electronic
- Length: 45:57
- Label: Arts & Crafts
- Producers: Bufflo; Jean-Michel Blais; Marc-André Mignault

Jean-Michel Blais chronology
Cascades (2017)	Dans ma main (2018)	Aubades (2022)

Dans ma main is the sophomore studio album from French-Canadian pianist and composer, Jean-Michel Blais, released on May 11, 2018 via Arts & Crafts. The album differs from the simple and down-to-earth production of his studio debut, Il, in that Blais explores more ethereal and electronic textures.

== Concept and production ==
On the Dans ma main, Blais experiments with different synth and electronic textures, a concept introduced to him while working with CFCF on Cascades. He enjoyed the possibilities he could explore with the new technology, allowing to explore sounds and textures beyond his piano. Blais explains in a conversation with Red Bull Music Academy, "I never want to lose contact with the original piano instrument, but we have so many tools now to treat it differently than to just have the instrument on its own, so why not use them, and how? It certainly is opening. It gives me sounds and texture possibilities".

Exclaim! wrote that, "Blais's Ableton Live explorations mark everything here, but for the most part, they're employed as a means of expanding on the piano's own abilities, further processing acoustic sounds to make them spin into focus".

Blais continued his partnership with friend and producer Bufflo, while also bringing in Marc-André Mignault for "Igloo" and the title track.

== Critical reception ==
Exclaim! gave the album a 9/10 in an early review, writing "Far from spiralling inward, as always, Blais lets it all flow through him, and as private becomes public, the result is yet another intimate masterpiece".

CBC's Ariane Cipriani summarized the album, writing "Dans ma main is also an invitation to ask our [hand], in this frantic world that leaves little place to sigh. It is also a spiritual quest that does not take a linear path: each beach reveals a different palette of sounds, alternating between tension and relaxation".

The album was a shortlisted finalist for the 2018 Polaris Music Prize.

== Track list ==
All tracks written by Jean-Michel Blais, except "God(s)" and "A Heartbeat Away" by Blais and Bufflo.

No.	Title	Length
1.	"Forteresse"	1:56
2.	"Roses"	5:46
3.	"Outsiders"	4:59
4.	"Dans ma main"	4:12
5.	"Blind"	5:40
6.	"God(s)"	2:34
7.	"Igloo"	4:35
8.	"Sourdine"	4:54
9.	"A Heartbeat Away"	6:10
10.	"Chanson"	5:12
Total length:		45:57

Notes

- All track titles are stylized in all lowercase.

== Personnel ==
Derived from the liner notes of Dans ma main.

- Performed by Jean-Michel Blais
- Produced, engineered, mixed, and recorded by Bufflo, Jean-Michel Blais, Marc-André Mignault
- Mastered by Richard Addison, Dimitri Condax
- Cover art photographed by John Londono
- Design by Log Creative Bureau

== Release ==
In early February and early March 2018, Blais released "Roses" and "Blind" respectively as singles, but did not announce the album until March 16, 2018. Those singles marked his first new music since Cascades came out in March 2017, and his first new solo material since the release of the Il deluxe edition on October 2.

Region	Date	Format	Label
Worldwide	May 11, 2018	Digital download; CD; vinyl LP	Arts & Crafts
