= Below the Salt (Haley Blais album) =

Studio album by Haley Blais
- Released: August 25, 2020
- Genre: Indie pop
- Length: 34:30
- Label: Tiny Kingdom
- Producers: Louise Burns; Alaina Moore; Patrick Riley

Haley Blais chronology
Below the Salt (2020)	Wisecrack (2023)

Below the Salt is the debut studio album by the Canadian singer-songwriter Haley Blais. The album was produced by the Canadian singer-songwriter Louise Burns, and Alaina Moore and Patrick Riley, the members of the indie pop duo Tennis. The album was released by Tiny Kingdom on 25 August 2020 to positive reviews.

== Background ==
Haley Blais started her entertainment career as a YouTube vlogger when she graduated high school in 2013, and later began uploading cover songs. Blais released her first EP Late Bloomer in 2016 and her second Let Yourself Go in 2018.

== Production and release ==
Below the Salt was written by Blais, who was influenced by musicians like Andy Shauf, Jenny Lewis, Carole King, and Kacey Musgraves. She said that writing the album was "an exercise in taking [her]self more seriously" and "looking at [her] experiences through a wider lens". The album was produced by the Canadian singer-songwriter Louise Burns, and Alaina Moore and Patrick Riley, the members of the indie pop duo Tennis. Tiny Kingdom released the debut album on Blais's 26th birthday, 25 August 2020.

== Critical reception ==
Below the Salt received positive reviews. Heather Taylor-Singh in Exclaim! called the album "confident in its delivery", praising the album's production and Blais's lyrics. Stuart Derdeyn in the Vancouver Sun likewise praised the album's production, highlighting several of the album's tracks. He called "On a Weekend" a "missing Fleetwood Mac track". Kieran Davey in Spill gave the album 4 out of 5 stars, praising the production and songwriting.

== Track listing ==
All tracks are written by Haley Blais.

No.	Title	Length
1.	"Someone Called While You Were Out"	2:29
2.	"On a Weekend"	2:41
3.	"Ready or Not"	5:03
4.	"Too Good"	3:35
5.	"Firestarter"	4:17
6.	"Asleep"	3:37
7.	"Be Your Own Muse"	4:01
8.	"Rob the Original"	3:41
9.	"So Funny"	5:02
Total length:		34:30

== Personnel ==
Credits are from the album jacket.

- Haley Blais – vocals (all tracks), synth (tracks 1–6), and piano (track 1)
- Brennan Boyle – drums (all tracks); bass (tracks 2, 4–5, 7–9); background vocals (tracks 2, 4); percussion, guitar, horn (track 5); piano (tracks 5, 7);
- Trevor Lang – guitar (tracks 1–3, 7–8), electric guitar (track 5), piano (tracks 8–9), engineering (tracks 2–3, 5, 9)
- Tegan Wahlgren – violin (tracks 3, 6)
- Will Robson – guitar (tracks 6, 9)
- Louise Burns – production (tracks 1–3, 5–6, 9), bass (tracks 1, 3, 6), synth (track 9)
- Alaina Moore – production (tracks 4, 7–8); organ, background vocals (track 4); piano (track 7)
- Patrick Riley – production (tracks 4, 7–8)
- Pedro Dzelme – engineering (tracks 1–3, 5–6, 9)
- Erik Nielsen – engineering (tracks 4, 7–8)
- Brendan Guy – engineering (tracks 4, 7–8)
- Trevor Spencer – mixing
- Philip Shaw Bova – mastering
