= Aubades (album) =

Studio album by Jean-Michel Blais
- Released: February 4, 2022
- Genre: Neoclassical
- Length: 41:59
- Label: Arts & Crafts

Jean-Michel Blais chronology
Dans ma main (2018)	Aubades (2022)

Aubades is the third studio album from French-Canadian pianist and composer Jean-Michel Blais, released on February 4, 2022, via Arts & Crafts. It received extensive coverage from national Canadian media, and a positive critical reception. Exclaim! wrote, "On the new album from the esteemed post-classical pianist, Blais is in perpetual bloom, moved by life's beauty and nature's song."

The album was longlisted for the 2022 Polaris Music Prize, and won the Félix Award for Instrumental Album of the Year at the 44th Félix Awards. It was a Juno Award nominee for Instrumental Album of the Year at the Juno Awards of 2023.

== Track listing ==
Aubades track listing
No.	Title	Length
1.	"Murmures"	5:06
2.	"Passepied"	3:51
3.	"Nina"	3:14
4.	"Flâneur"	2:12
5.	"Ouessant"	3:55
6.	"If You Build It, They Will Come"	4:24
7.	"Amour"	4:37
8.	"Yanni"	4:40
9.	"Absinthe"	2:49
10.	"Carrousel"	2:28
11.	"Doux"	4:47
Total length:		41:59

Notes

- All track titles are stylized in all lowercase.

== Charts ==
Chart performance for Aubades
Chart (2022)	Peak position
Canadian Albums (Billboard)	14
