= Louise Burns =

Canadian singer-songwriter

- Born: November 14, 1985 (age 40)
- Genres: Indie rock; folk rock; country; pop; alternative
- Occupations: Singer-songwriter; musician
- Instruments: Vocal; guitar; piano; bass; mandolin; ukulele; organ
- Years active: 1997-present
- Label: Light Organ Records
- Website: www.louise-burns.com

Louise Claire Burns (born November 14, 1985), is a Canadian singer and songwriter. Formerly a member of the band Lillix, she released her debut album as a solo artist, Mellow Drama, on April 5, 2011, on Light Organ Records. The album was longlisted for the 2011 Polaris Music Prize. She is also a member of the group Gold & Youth.

== Solo Artist Work ==
Louise Burns' debut album Mellow Drama was produced by Dave Ogilvie and Kevin James Maher. Her second album, The Midnight Mass, was released July 9, 2013. The album was produced by Colin Stewart of The Hive and Sune Rose Wagner (Raveonettes). Her song "Emeralds Shatter" was nominated for the SOCAN Songwriting Prize in 2014.

Burns released her third album Young Mopes on February 3, 2017. It was produced by Burns, Colin Stewart (Ladyhawk, Black Mountain) and Damian Taylor (Bjork, Braids, Austra). It was long listed for the Polaris Music Prize in 2017. She received positive critical reception from The New York Times, Stereogum and CBC Music.

Burns produced the debut EP by Vancouver's FIONN, titled Sad Pagans and released on April 25, 2018. Burns was also a guest host and writer for CBC Radio 3 from 2011 to 2017. Her album Portraits was released November 9, 2019. The album received positive reviews from Exclaim! and the Vancouver Sun.

Burns' fifth solo record Element was released April 21, 2023. She then released an EP of five instrumental tracks titled Unseen on November 7, 2025. It marks her first independent release as a solo artist.

== Writing & Producer Work ==
Louise Burns also works extensively as a co-writer and producer for other artists. She's a member of the movement We Are Moving The Needle, which empowers women, non-binary, and trans producers and engineers. As of 2026, she has worked with Orville Peck, Haley Blais, Kandle, and more.

== Discography ==
- Mellow Drama (2011)
- Singles (EP, 2011)
- The Midnight Mass (2013)
- Young Mopes (2017)
- Portraits (2019)
- Element (2023)
- Unseen (EP, 2025)
