= Jeffrey Remedios =

Canadian chief executive

- Remedios in 2026
- Education: McMaster University
- Occupation: Music executive
- Years active: 2003-present
- Spouse: Lucia Graca
- Children: 2

Jeffrey Remedios is the chairman and CEO of Universal Music Canada. He also founded Arts & Crafts Records, and chairs the Toronto International Film Festival. He has appeared multiple times on the Billboard list of international power players (most recently in 2023), and was named by Toronto Life as one of Toronto's 50 most influential people. In August 2025, during his TIFF chairmanship, the festival drew public attention for rescinding the invitation to screen the documentary The Road Between Us: The Ultimate Rescue, citing concerns over legal clearance of footage, a decision criticized by the filmmakers and some advocacy groups.

== Career ==
Remedios began his post-school career in music at Virgin Music Canada (later EMI Music Canada), holding various posts, including Media & Artist Relations, Digital Marketing, and Director of National Promotion.

=== Arts & Crafts ===
In 2003, Remedios left EMI and launched Arts & Crafts Productions with Kevin Drew. The goal of the new label was to create a vehicle to release and promote content from Drew's band, Broken Social Scene. Under Remedios' leadership, artists working under Arts & Crafts have collected 21 Juno wins. In 2013, with Arts & Crafts, Remedios co-founded the annual Field Trip Music & Arts Festival in Toronto.

=== Universal Music Canada ===
On September 21, 2015, Universal Music Group CEO Lucian Grainge appointed Remedios as President and CEO of Universal Music Canada. He oversaw the creation of Universal's new office in Liberty Village, Toronto, which opened in 2022 and includes 80A recording studios and a performance venue.

=== Professional associations ===
On November 29, 2021, Remedios was named chairman of the Toronto International Film Festival, after previously spending five years on the board. He also serves on the board of directors of Arts & Crafts, the Canadian Academy of Recording Arts and Sciences, Music Canada, and MusiCounts.

== Education ==
Remedios graduated from McMaster University in Hamilton, Ontario, in 1998 with a degree in commerce and a minor in music. Jeffrey served as music director at CFMU FM from 1994 to 1996. McMaster presented Remedios with its Alumni Gallery Award in 2013.

== Personal life ==
Remedios grew up in Scarborough, Ontario, the son of Macau-born parents and the youngest of three brothers. In 2015 he married Lucia Graca at a ceremony in Burl's Creek Event Grounds, site of the Wayhome and Boots And Hearts music festivals. Their wedding reception included musical performances by several artists from the Arts & Crafts label. They live in Toronto and have two children. Toronto Life magazine named the couple among the city's Best Dressed in 2016. Remedios delivered the keynote address at Canadian Music Week on June 8, 2022.

== Controversy ==
In August 2025, during Remedios’s tenure as chair of the Toronto International Film Festival (TIFF) board, the festival rescinded its invitation to screen the Canadian documentary The Road Between Us: The Ultimate Rescue, about rescue efforts during the 7 October 2023 Hamas attack in Israel. TIFF stated the decision was based on the film’s failure to meet “general requirements,” including legal clearance for all footage; reporting indicated that disputed material included videos live-streamed by Hamas militants during the attack. The filmmakers and several advocacy groups criticized the move as censorship, while TIFF maintained that the film did not satisfy its legal-clearance requirements.
