= Babygirl (duo) =

Canadian musical duo

Babygirl is a Canadian dream pop duo from Toronto consisting of Kiki Frances and Cameron Breithaupt.

== History ==
The duo released their debut EP in 2016 titled As You Wish. In 2017, the duo released a song titled "Seth and Summer Forever." and a song called "I Won't Get Over You." The duo released their second EP in 2018 titled "Lovers Fevers." The duo released a new song in 2020 titled "Easy." In 2022, they released a song titled "You Were In My Dream Last Night." Losers Weepers, the duo's third EP, was released in 2021. The duo released their debut album, Stay Here Where It's Warm, in 2025 via Arts & Crafts Productions.

== Discography ==
Studio albums

- Stay Here Where It's Warm (2025, Arts & Crafts Productions)

EPs

- As You Wish (2016, self-released)
- Lovers Fevers (2018, self-released)
- Losers Weepers (2021, self-released)
