= Il (album) =

Studio album by Jean-Michel Blais
- Released: April 8, 2016
- Genres: Minimal; neoclassical
- Length: 29:34
- Label: Arts & Crafts
- Producer: Bufflo

Jean-Michel Blais chronology
| Il (2016) | Cascades (2017) |

Singles from Il
- 1. "Nostos" Released: February 24, 2016; 2. "Il" Released: March 24, 2016; 3. "Pour Johanne" Released: September 21, 2016

Il is the debut studio album of French-Canadian pianist and composer Jean-Michel Blais, released in April 2016 by the Arts & Crafts. The album is a set of improvised piano pieces Blais recorded in his bedroom in Montreal with a Zoom microphone. The LP was produced in such a manner where the listener feels immersed in the music by having other sounds outside the piano bleed into the recording, such as breathing, camera shutters, rain, kids playing, and more. The compositions featured on Il also had sheet music released by Arts & Crafts in July 2016. Il garnered critical acclaim, landing on Time magazine's list of the top ten best albums of the year, and also made it to the longlist of the 2016 Polaris Music Prize, though it never made it into the shortlist.

== Concept and production ==
Il is a collection of minimal improvisational piano pieces Blais composed over the course of two years. The compositions have a melodic pop structure a la Chilly Gonzales and Yann Tiersen, in addition to having influences of the works of Erik Satie, Lubomyr Melnyk, Philip Glass, and Maurice Ravel. The compositions on Il goes through a diverse range of emotions, from “Nostos" being a sad and thoughtful track to "Budapest" being very playful. As Blais described the title of Il,

It’s called Il and “two” at the same point. So the concept is that the I which is “one” was a compilation of songs that existed but are not really interesting now. So the I is the idea that the first act of an artist is often super autobiographical. You talk about yourself, so it’s I. And the second thing, which is Il, which is “he,” which is the other. It’s also the name of a song on the album. I don’t know what to say. It feels like this openness to the other, which is why it’s called Il, but it may be confused with a “two,” when it’s actually also a “two.” It’s a play on words. This is the second opus, but I’d prefer not to talk about the first one. Maybe someday something will happen with it.

"If people are going to cough and babies are going to cry, instead of trying to hide it, why not embrace it? I like it when I stop and there’s something happening outside my window. I think that’s why my music has a lot of pauses and silences, because there’s always something happening in the street. I’ll let it pass and then continue playing."

— Blais in an interview with Montreal Gazette

Recording of Il lasted only two days. While moving to Argentina, Blais communicated via Facebook with his friend Devon Bate, credited on the album as Bufflo, to mix the album. Mixing was completed by the time Blais was in Argentina's capital city Buenos Aires. Il is produced in such a manner where the listeners feels surrounded in the music. Blais explained that he began recording his improvisational piano compositions for a full-length album when "one day I realized I had forgotten a piece I had composed," wanting to "document" the piece with the "cheapest Zoom [microphone] you can find." As he explained, "I didn’t want to have a grand piano with a super nice, polished sound. Those improvised pieces are composed in my room with this little recorder. If it was rainy, we could hear the rain, or my roommates speaking."

This gave Blais the idea to "show" what happened outside the room to "bring" the listener into Blais' bedroom: "you['re] sitting there on the couch—and I just play you some pieces of music." Surrounding the piano throughout the album are noises, or "the sounds of life" as Exclaim! put it, of outside weather, camera shutters, raining, breathing, bird chirping, and kids playing. Blais described having these sounds bleed into the recordings as an "acknowledgement that the music is never pure, perfect, and exactly the same–because you listen in your headphones, walking in the street, and what you hear is actually the music plus the car that just passed by you." As writer Stephen Carlick stated, "at times, I felt so immersed in the music, so surrounded, that I was compelled to glance over my shoulder. Though it's a minimalist work of art, Il is overwhelmingly present and alive."

== Release ==
The record was first released online via Bandcamp in 2015. Cameron Reed of the label Arts & Crafts discovered the album on the site and emailed Blais to join the label in late 2015. The lead single of Il was "Nostos," which was released on February 24, 2016. An official music video for the track, directed by Jason Rodi and released on March 22, 2016, involves footage of glaciers and seas. On March 24, The Fader premiered the album's title track. Arts & Crafts gave Il an official release on April 8, 2016. Arts & Crafts then released a sheet music book of pieces from the album in digital format on July 15 and physically on July 27. The sheet music release had two additional compositions by Blais, "Ad claritatem domine" and "Pour Johanne," which were later included as tracks on the expanded deluxe edition of Il that was released on October 7, 2016. Blais put "Pour Johanne" together based on the death of the mother of one of his friends.

== Reception ==
Professional ratings
Review scores
| Source | Rating |
|---|---|
| Exclaim! | 9/10 |
| Now | 4/5 Ns |

The Verge called it "thrilling, versatile music," highlighting the record's use of sounds that are heard around the piano: "The album is studded with field recordings and idle noise, and some of its most exciting sequences are dependent on physical presence: Blais’ breath, the thudding and clacking of the piano's keys and pedals, the heavy air of the room in which he's playing." Now reviewer Carla Gillis was favorable towards the album, her only major criticism being that "you wish the album were at least twice as long."

Carlick, reviewing for Exclaim!, wrote, "Blais maintains a strong sense of originality and personality on Il — a hard thing to do on an instrument that's over 300 years old — by mixing a number of styles into his own strongly emotive sound that's never overly cheery or melancholy, but still suits both moods perfectly." Another writer for the source, Calum Slingerland, stated that "Blais's playing is at once immersive and intricate, able to appeal to both genre purists and casual listeners." Il was awarded as one of the "Top 10 Improv & Avant-Garde Albums" of 2016 by the publication. Il was number ten on Time magazine's list of the best albums of 2016, who praised the LP's minimal structure: "The music breathes, and it invites you to take a moment and recognize there’s still plenty of beauty left in the world." It also was on the longlist of the 2016 Polaris Music Prize but didn't make it into the top-ten shortlist.

== Track listing ==
Derived from the liner notes of Il.

| No. | Title | Length |
|---|---|---|
| 1. | "Hasselblad 4 (Improvisation)" | 1:51 |
| 2. | "Il" | 2:05 |
| 3. | "Dada" | 2:40 |
| 4. | "Nostos" (featuring Bufflo) | 4:30 |
| 5. | "Ad claritatem domine" | 5:53 |
| 6. | "Hasselblad 2 (Improvisation)" | 0:58 |
| 7. | "Budapest" | 3:50 |
| 8. | "Casa" | 7:47 |
| Total length: | | 29:34 |

Deluxe edition bonus tracks
| No. | Title | Length |
|---|---|---|
| 9. | "Pour Johanne" | 4:43 |
| 10. | "Rondo majeur (3 Mains)" | 3:42 |
| Total length: | | 37:59 |

Notes

- The title of track 2 is stylized in all lowercase.

== Personnel ==
Derived from the liner notes of Il.

- Written and performed by Jean-Michel Blais
- Produced, engineered, mixed, and recorded by Bufflo
- Mastered by Joshua Stevenson
- Piano on "Casa" by Karine Bouchard
- Cover art photographed by Eric Morrissette
- Physical release design and layout by Isis Essery

== Release history ==
| Region | Date | Format(s) | Label |
|---|---|---|---|
| Worldwide | April 8, 2016 | Digital download; vinyl | Arts & Crafts |
| Worldwide – deluxe edition | October 7, 2016 | Digital download; vinyl | Arts & Crafts |
