= Jean-Michel Blais =

Canadian pianist and composer (born 1984)

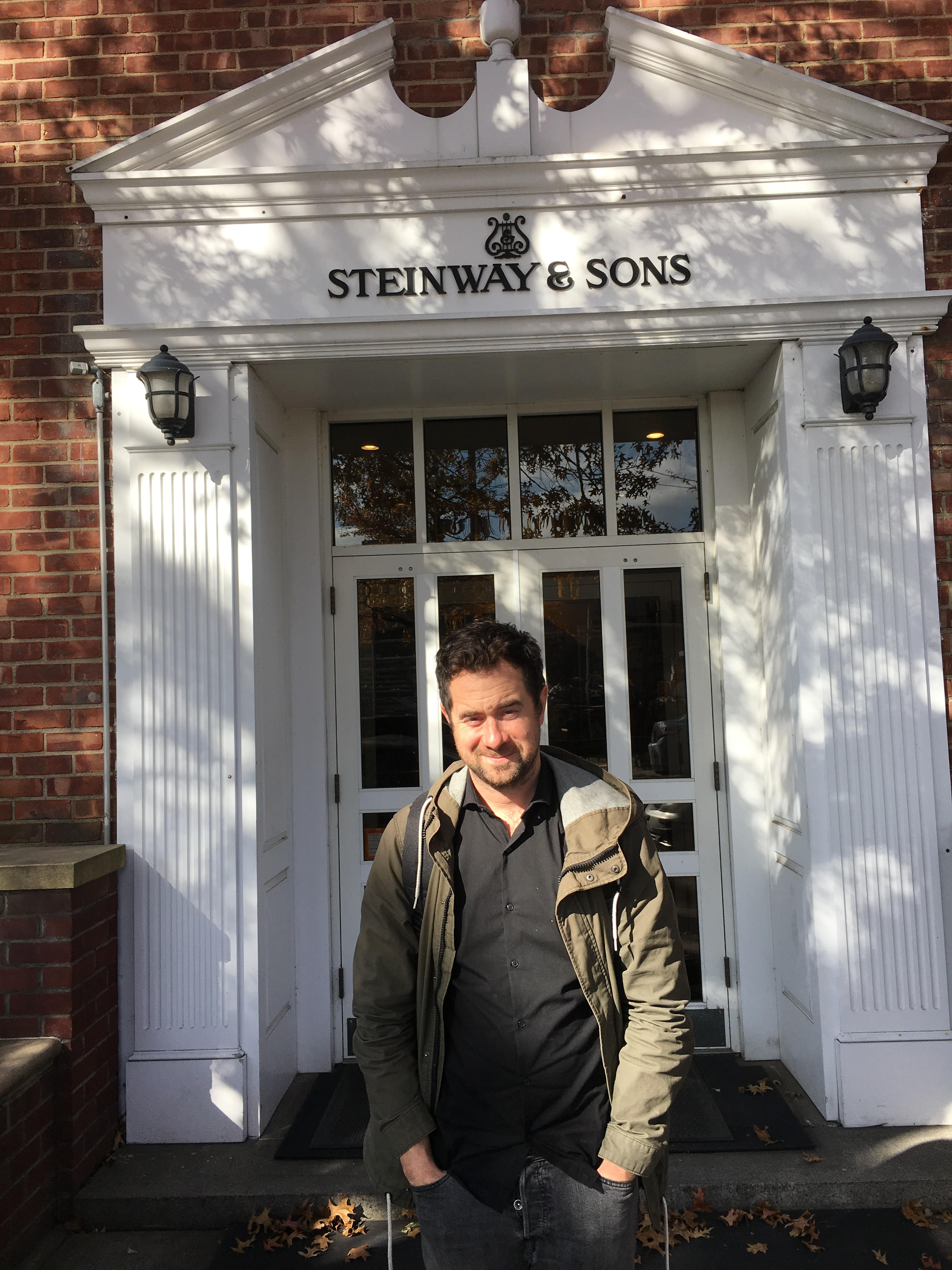
- Blais in 2018

Background information
- Born: 1984 (age 41–42)
- Origin: Nicolet, Quebec, Canada
- Genres: Minimalist; avant-garde; neoclassical
- Occupation: Musician
- Instrument: Piano
- Years active: 2015–present
- Label: Arts & Crafts
- Website: jeanmichelblais.com

Jean-Michel Blais (born 1984) is a composer and pianist from Quebec, Canada.

His music is influenced by a range of composers and pianists such as Frédéric Chopin, Sergei Rachmaninoff, Maurice Ravel, classical minimalists (Steve Reich, Philip Glass, Erik Satie), and modern composers such as Chilly Gonzales and Yann Tiersen. English pop singer Ellie Goulding has cited Blais as an inspiration for her fourth album.

His debut studio album Il was released in April 2016 on Arts & Crafts, garnering critical acclaim, including making Time magazine's top ten albums of the year list. In 2017, he collaborated with Grammy-nominated English-Canadian electronic artist CFCF on the EP Cascades. His sophomore album, Dans ma main, was released on 11 May 2018, also on Arts & Crafts, and on 30 November 2018 Jean-Michel released Eviction Sessions.

== Early life ==
Jean-Michel Blais grew up in the rural town of Nicolet, Quebec. As a young boy, his parents influenced his love of music. While not serious musicians, his father sang in a choir as a child, and his mother would play the organ. Blais began his musical adventures by "drumming with pots and pans [and] mix-taping Radio-Canada "world" music, traditional, Celtic, [Andean], and Eastern European [music]".

As a teenager, he took piano lessons, eventually studying at the Trois-Rivières Music Conservatory. However, he found the academic world of music exhausting and restrictive, so he left after two years to travel.

He travelled to Guatemala, spending several months there working at an orphanage. Looking again for a change, he then moved to Berlin for a year, and then went to South America, spending time in Buenos Aires, Argentina. Finally, Blais decided to settle in Montreal, pursuing a career as a special education teacher. He completed a degree in liberal arts with a minor in psychology while focusing his studies on special education. After graduating, he worked with children with disabilities and behavioural disorders for five years at CEGEP level.

== Career ==
=== 2016: Il ===
While working in special education, Blais slowly rediscovered a fondness for improvising and composing. Blais constructed his debut album, Il, over the course of two years. It was recorded in two days in Blais' apartment with a Zoom recorder, allowing the ambience of his apartment to come through on the recording.

If people are going to cough and babies are going to cry, instead of trying to hide it, why not embrace it? I like it when I stop and there's something happening outside my window. I think that's why my music has a lot of pauses and silences, because there's always something happening in the street. I'll let it pass and then continue playing.

— Jean-Michel Blais in an interview with the Montreal Gazette

Blais communicated via Facebook with his friend Devon Bate, credited on the album as BUFFLO, to mix the album. The recording was done in such a manner that the listener feels surrounded by the music. Blais originally released the album via Bandcamp in 2015, where it was discovered by Arts & Crafts, and subsequently given a proper release on 8 April 2016. Arts & Crafts also released the sheet music for the album, along with a deluxe edition featuring two bonus tracks that was released in October 2016. The album was widely acclaimed, ranking 10th on Time Magazine's Top 10 Albums of 2016. Exclaim! gave the album 9/10, writing, "Simply put, Il is a masterpiece."

=== 2017: Cascades ===
Michael Silver (a.k.a. CFCF) and Blais first collaborated when the Red Bull Music Academy sponsored a live performance featuring the two artists. Blais and Silver found that they lived around the corner from each other, then started finding similarities in their music and composition style. Cascades features two songs each of their solo works, reworked as a duo, and a cover of John Cage's In a Landscape (1948).

I thought [Jean-Michel's music] was beautiful... I just loved it a bunch, especially because it's so different from a lot of the other piano music that I had tended to listen to...

— Michael Silver (CFCF)

Cascades was also met with critical acclaim. For Pitchfork, Andy Beta opined that it "finds Silver and Blais warily feeling one another other out and then synchronizing to exalted effect by the record's end," and called the duo's version of "In a Landscape", "one of the most unequivocally gorgeous covers imaginable". Exclaim! also highlighted Blais and Silver's chemistry, reasoning that "Blais' playing suits very well the pristine and glossy production Silver employed for those recordings, injecting it with a real sense of purpose here," giving the album an 8/10.

=== 2018: Dans ma main ===
Dans ma main is Blais' sophomore solo record, released via Arts & Crafts on 11 May 2018. Exclaim! gave the album 9/10 in an early review, writing "Far from spiralling inward, as always, Blais lets it all flow through him, and as private becomes public, the result is yet another intimate masterpiece". On the album, he experiments with different synth and electronic textures, a concept introduced to him while working with CFCF.

Blais explained in a conversation with CFCF and Red Bull Music Academy, "I never want to lose contact with the original piano instrument, but we have so many tools now to treat it differently than to just have the instrument on its own, so why not use them, and how? It certainly is opening. It gives me sounds and texture possibilities". The album was a shortlisted finalist for the 2018 Polaris Music Prize. In August 2019, Blais released an EP of remixes of Dans ma main.

=== Eviction Sessions, Matthias & Maxime, and Aubades ===
Eviction Sessions is Blais' third project, released via Arts & Crafts on 30 November 2018. Eviction Sessions was inspired when Blais was informed he would be evicted from the apartment where he had lived for seven years due to gentrification within his Montreal neighbourhood. This was the same apartment in which Blais recorded his first album of instrumental music, Il.

In October 2019, Blais released the soundtrack to the Canadian film Matthias & Maxime. He received special mention at the Cannes Soundtrack Award in May of the same year.

In February 2022, Blais released the album Aubades. It won the Félix Award for Instrumental Album of the Year at the 44th Félix Awards; it was also nominated for Bestselling Album of the Year, and Blais was a nominee for Most Successful Artist Outside Quebec. It was a nominee for Instrumental Album of the Year at the Juno Awards of 2023.

== Discography ==
Studio albums

- Il (2016)
- Dans ma main (2018)
- Aubades (2022)
- Désert (2025)
- Mirador (2026)

Soundtracks

- Matthias & Maxime (Original Motion Picture Soundtrack) (2019)

EPs

- Cascades with CFCF (2017)
- Eviction Sessions (2018)
- Dans ma main (Remixes) (2019)
- Sérénades (2023)

Singles

- "Nostos" (2016)
- "Il" (2016)
- "Ad Claritatem Domine" (2016)
- "Pour Johanne" (2016)
- "Roses" (2018)
- "Blind" (2018)
- "Forteresse" (2018)
- "Outsiders" (2018)
- "Signal" feat. Daniel Bélanger (2021)
- "Murmures" (2021)
- "Amour" (2022)
- "Ouessant" (2022)

Appearances

- "Lullaby" Playing House (Common Holly, 2017)
