= Samantha Savage Smith =

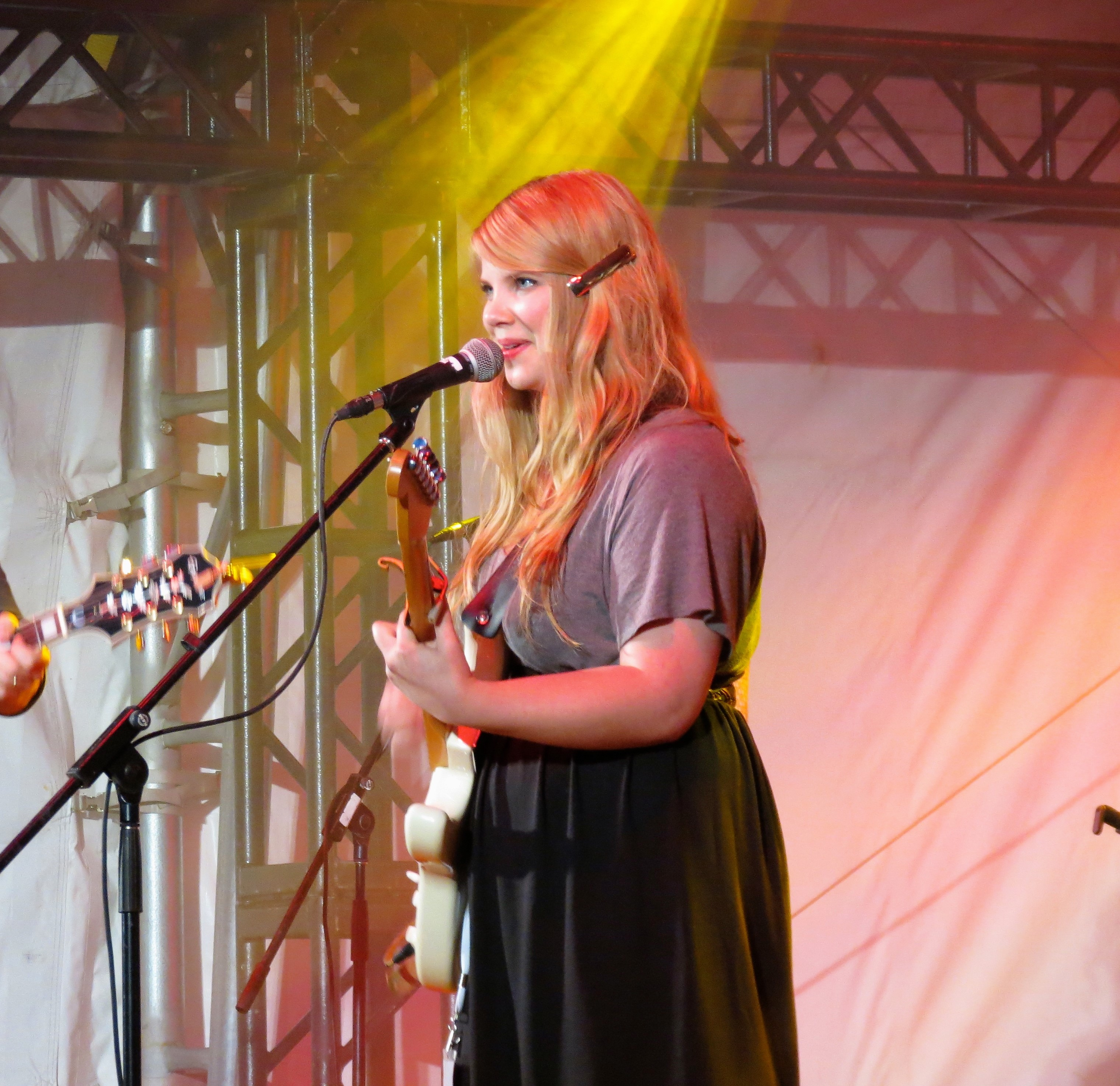
- Samantha Savage Smith, September 2012

Background information
- Born: Calgary, Alberta, Canada
- Genres: Indie folk, indie rock
- Occupations: Musician, singer-songwriter
- Instruments: Vocals, guitar
- Years active: 2010–present
- Labels: Western Famine, Arts & Crafts

Samantha Savage Smith is a Canadian singer-songwriter from Calgary, Alberta. Her voice and music style has been described as "a marriage of jazz, blues and indie rock influences."

She performed locally in Calgary in the late 2000s, but then took some time off from music after beginning to doubt the quality of her work. During her sabbatical, local record producer Lorrie Matheson contacted her after hearing her early demos, and worked with her to develop and record her debut album, Tough Cookie, which was released in 2011. Originally released locally on Alberta-based independent label Western Famine, the album was later reissued across Canada with distribution by Arts & Crafts.

Savage Smith performed at the Calgary Folk Music Festival in 2010 and at Toronto's North by Northeast festival in 2011, and has played at the Canadian consulate in New Orleans. She performed a cross-Canada tour to support Tough Cookie in early 2012. Smith has since released three more full length albums.

== Discography ==
- Tough Cookie (2011)
- Fine Lines (2015)
- Fake Nice (2022)
- Little Place (2026)
