= Population (album) =

Studio album by the Most Serene Republic
- Released: October 2, 2007
- Genre: Indie
- Length: 53:50
- Label: Arts & Crafts
- Producer: Ryan Lenssen

The Most Serene Republic chronology
Phages (EP) (2006)	Population (2007)	...And The Ever Expanding Universe (2009)

Professional ratings
Review scores
Source	Rating
AllMusic	4/5 stars
The A.V. Club	B–
Drowned in Sound	(9/10)
The Line of Best Fit	69%
No Ripcord	(8/10)
Now	NNN
Pitchfork	5.8/10
PopMatters	(7/10)

Population is the second studio album by Canadian indie rock band the Most Serene Republic. It was recorded and mixed by Ryan Mills, Mike Kuehn and Ryan Lenssen at Sleepytown Sound in Toronto. The album was released on October 2, 2007, through Arts & Crafts. This is the first album to feature the band's new rhythm section of Tony Nesbitt-Larking and Simon Lukasewich. The album artwork features the Muji toy "suburbia in a bag".

== Track listing ==
No.	Title	Length
1.	"Humble Peasants"	3:22
2.	"Compliance"	4:13
3.	"The Men Who Live Upstairs"	4:31
4.	"Present of Future End"	5:24
5.	"A Mix of Sun and Cloud"	3:50
6.	"Battle Hymn of the Republic"	3:26
7.	"Why So Looking Back"	4:47
8.	"Sherry and Her Butterfly Net"	5:10
9.	"Agenbite of Inwit"	2:06
10.	"Career in Shaping Clay"	4:03
11.	"Solipsism Millionaires"	4:46
12.	"Multiplication Desks"	4:59
13.	"Neurasthenia"	3:13
Total length:		53:50
