= Gold & Youth =

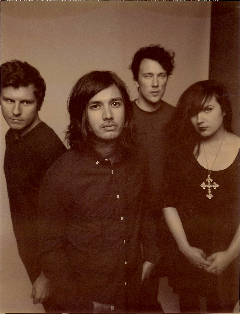
- Credit: Ronnie Lee Hill

Background information
- Origin: Vancouver, British Columbia and Toronto, Ontario
- Genres: Indie rock, post-punk revival, Electronic music
- Years active: 2011–present
- Labels: Arts & Crafts, EMI, Paper Bag Records
- Members: Matthew Lyall; Louise Burns; Murray Mckenzie; Jeff Mitchelmore
- Past members: Ted Gowans
- Website: goldandyouth.com

Gold & Youth are an indie rock and electronic band based in Vancouver and Toronto. Signed to Arts & Crafts in 2011, they released their debut album titled Beyond Wilderness on 14 May 2013. The release of their debut record has garnered them significant critical acclaim, particularly in the UK.

== History ==
The band was formed by Matthew Lyall, Murray Mckenzie and Jeff Mitchelmore in 2011 after the demise of their previous project The Racoons. Arts & Crafts announced the signing of Gold & Youth in early 2012, along with the debut of their first single Time To Kill. At this time it was also announced that Louise Burns had joined the band as a permanent member, having previously provided guest vocals on several recordings as well as lead vocals on their third single titled Jewel. The band spent 2012 finishing the recording of their debut record Beyond Wilderness as well as making early international festival appearances at SXSW, The Great Escape, NXNE, CMW, and Big Sound (Australia), with their live appearances garnering critical acclaim from NME and The Guardian.

In November 2012, they released their first EP, a 7-inch single featuring the singles Time to Kill and City of Quartz to positive critical acclaim coinciding with a national tour of Canada with Diamond Rings. In March 2013, the band released their third single Jewel and announced the release date of 14 May 2013 for their debut album Beyond Wilderness.

Lyall has cited the work of OMD as a musical reference point. The band selected their name upon suggestion from fellow Canadian musician Buck 65. The name itself is a same-sounding (homophonous) phrase with: Golden Youth, a character from the Mad Max film series.

The band posted a series of updates to their social media in 2020 stating they are working on a new record.

On 27 August 2021, the band released a new single "The Worse The Better" and announced their sophomore record Dream Baby would be released 5 November 2021 through Paper Bag Records. The single "Maudlin Days (Robocop)" was released 22 September 2021, and the single "Dying In LA" followed on 13 October 2021.

== Beyond Wilderness ==
Gold & Youth's first full-length record, titled Beyond Wilderness, was released internationally on 14 May 2013, by Arts & Crafts and EMI. The album was produced and recorded by Colin Stewart (Black Mountain, New Pornographers, Destroyer) and mixed by Gareth Jones (Depeche Mode, Interpol, Grizzly Bear) and Damian Taylor (Björk, Robyn, Arcade Fire). According to the official band bio, the album is "built with dark, expansive synthetic textures, punctuated by programmed drums and interwoven with melancholy vocals, detuned synth melodies and understated guitars".

== Members ==
=== Current members ===
- Matthew Lyall – guitar, keyboards, vocals
- Jeff Mitchelmore – drums, Drum sequencer
- Murray Mckenzie – guitar, keyboards, vocals
- Louise Burns – bass guitar, vocals, Synthesizer

=== Former members ===
- Ted Gowans – bass guitar, keyboards backing vocals

== Discography ==
=== Albums ===
- Beyond Wilderness (Arts & Crafts / EMI) – 14 May 2013
- Dream Baby (Paper Bag Records) – 5 November 2021

=== EPs ===
- Time to Kill/City of Quartz (Arts & Crafts / EMI) – 17 November 2012

=== Singles ===
- Time to Kill (Arts & Crafts / EMI) – 28 February 2012
- City of Quartz (Arts & Crafts / EMI) – 15 October 2012
- Jewel (Arts & Crafts / EMI) – 5 March 2013
- The Worse The Better (Paper Bag Records) – 27 August 2021
- Maudlin Days (Robocop) (Paper Bag Records) – 22 September 2021
- Dying in LA (Paper Bag Records) – 13 October 2021

=== Compilation appearances ===
- Arts & Crafts Record Store Day LP (Arts & Crafts / EMI) – 21 April 2012

== See also ==
- Music of Canada
- Canadian rock
- List of bands from Canada
- List of Canadian musicians
- Category:Canadian musical groups
