= Leif Erikson (band) =

English rock band

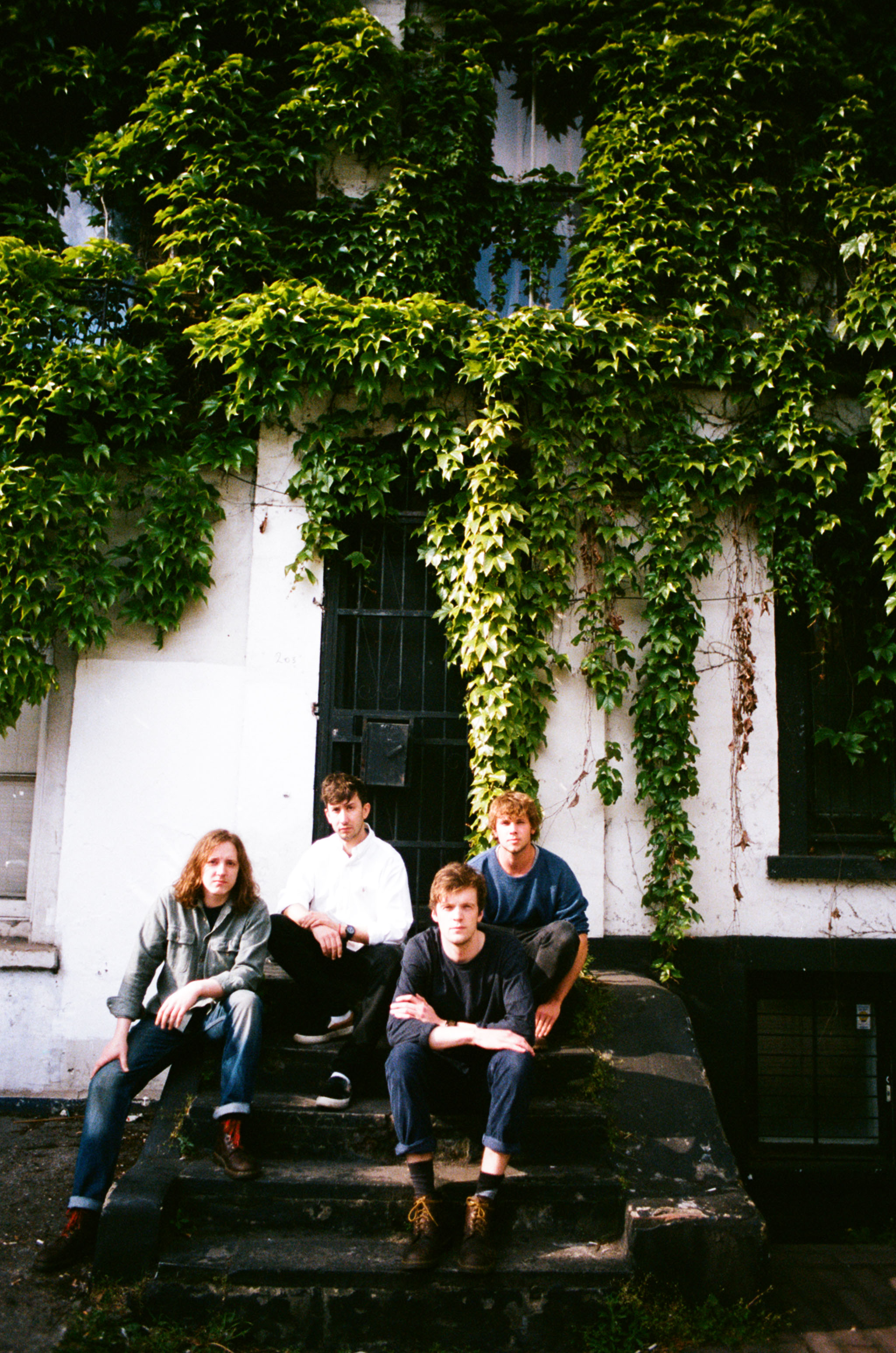

Background information
- Origin: London, England
- Genres: Indie rock
- Years active: 2015–present
- Labels: Arts & Crafts
- Spinoff of: Flashgun
- Members: Sam Johnston; Oliver Wright; Tom Leader; Greg Austin; Giles Robinson

Leif Erikson are an English indie rock band based in London. Their debut, self-titled album was released in August 2017. The group have been reviewed in publications including Stereogum, Clash, and Line of Best Fit.

== History ==
Leif Erikson formed in 2015, after members of the band Flashguns reunited. Their debut, self-titled album was released in 2017 by Arts & Crafts in the United States and Canada and self released elsewhere. In 2021, they issued the EP 21 Grams of Soul.

== Band members ==
- Sam Johnston
- Oliver Wright
- Tom Leader
- Greg Austin
- Giles Robinson

== Discography ==
Studio albums

- Leif Erikson (2017)

EPs

- 21 Grams of Soul (2021)

Singles

- "Looking for Signs" (2015)
- "Matter" (2018)
- "Second Curve" (2019)
- "Question Time" (2020)
- "Waiting for a Brighter Day" (2021)
- "200 Times" (2021)
