= Timber Timbre =

Canadian folk music band

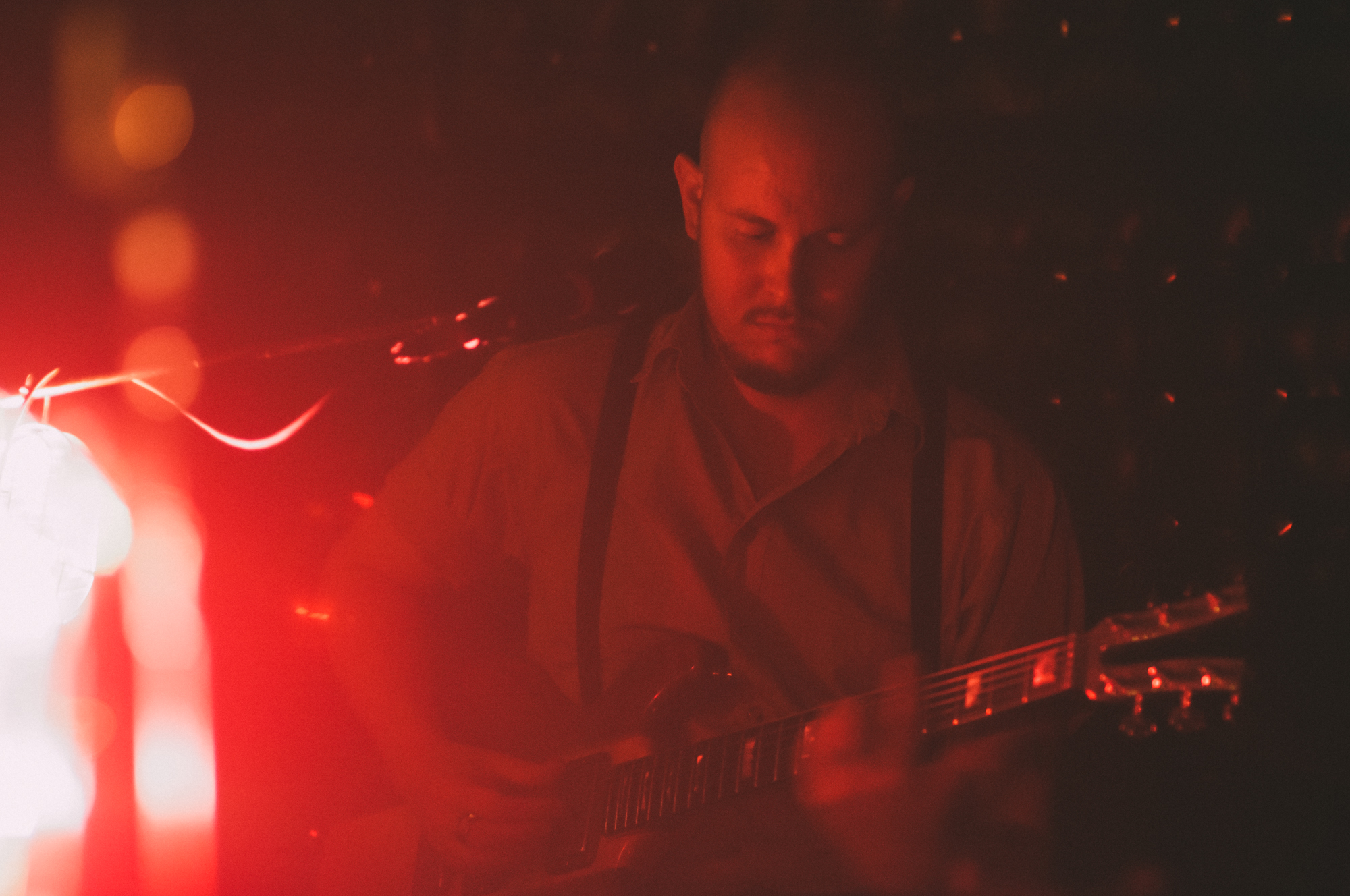
- Timber Timbre performing in San Diego, California in 2011

Background information
- Origin: Toronto, Ontario and Montreal, Quebec, Canada
- Years active: 2005–2026
- Labels: Arts & Crafts, Out of This Spark, Full Time Hobby, City Slang
- Past members: Taylor Kirk; (see other members)
- Website: timbertimbre.ca

Timber Timbre was a Canadian band featuring Taylor Kirk. The moniker refers to an early series of recordings made in a timber-framed cabin set in the wooded outskirts of Bobcaygeon, Ontario. Kirk died in 2026.

== History ==
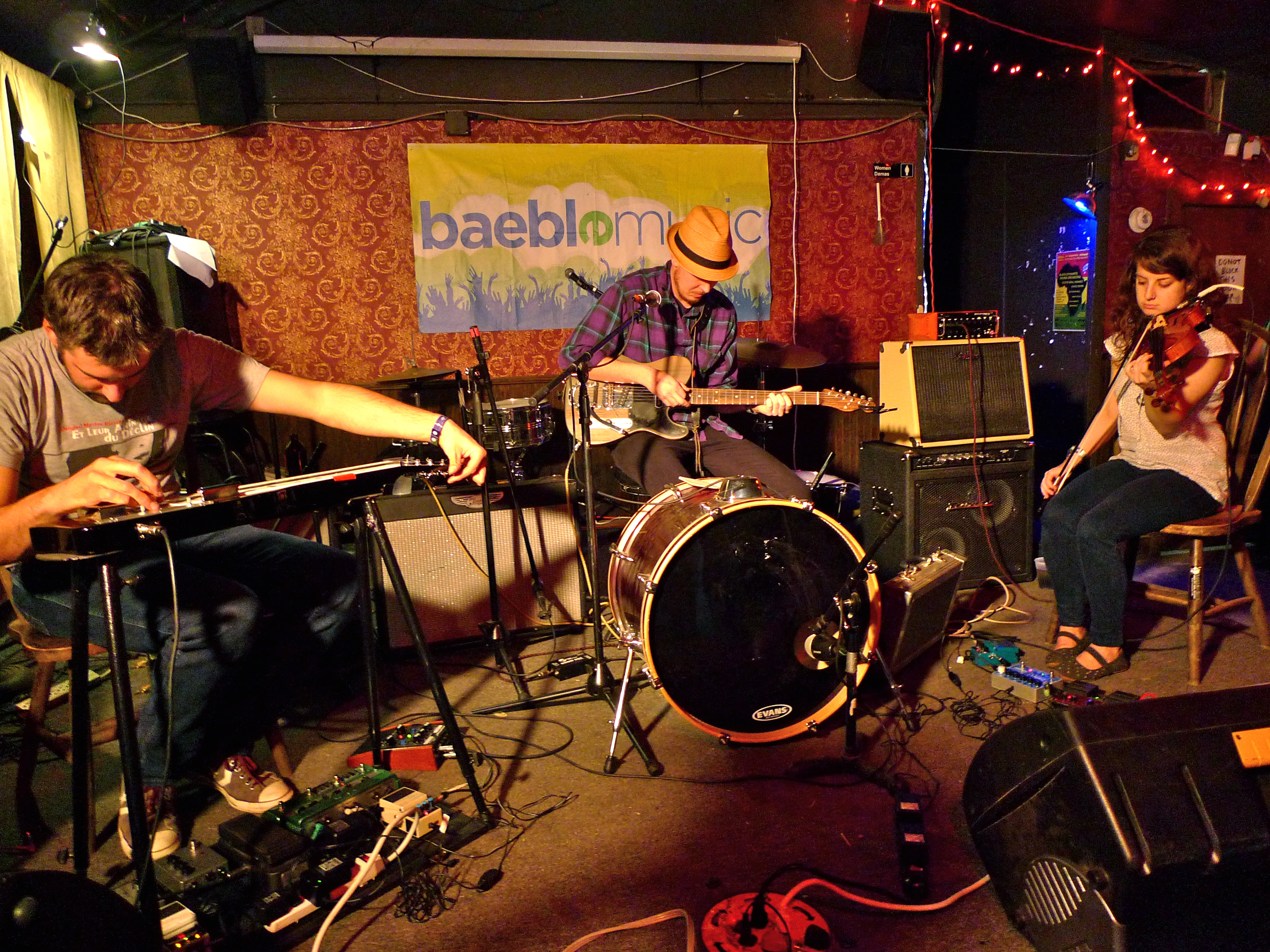
Timber Timbre performing in San Francisco, California in 2010

Timber Timbre was started as a solo project by Taylor Kirk in 2005. Timber Timbre released two albums independently before releasing their self-titled album on Out of This Spark in January 2009. They were subsequently signed to Arts & Crafts, who re-released the album on June 30 in Canada and July 28 internationally. The album was named as a longlist nominee for the 2009 Polaris Music Prize on June 15, 2009, and was deemed album of the year by Eye Weekly. Mika Posen and Simon Trottier joined Timber Timbre in 2009, with Posen later commenting, "It's still pretty new for [Kirk], playing with a band. The last record was still mainly Taylor's project and was put together as a live band afterward." In 2011, Exclaim wrote, "Though guest musicians have graced most of Timber Timbre's records, the essence has always been Kirk's personal vision."

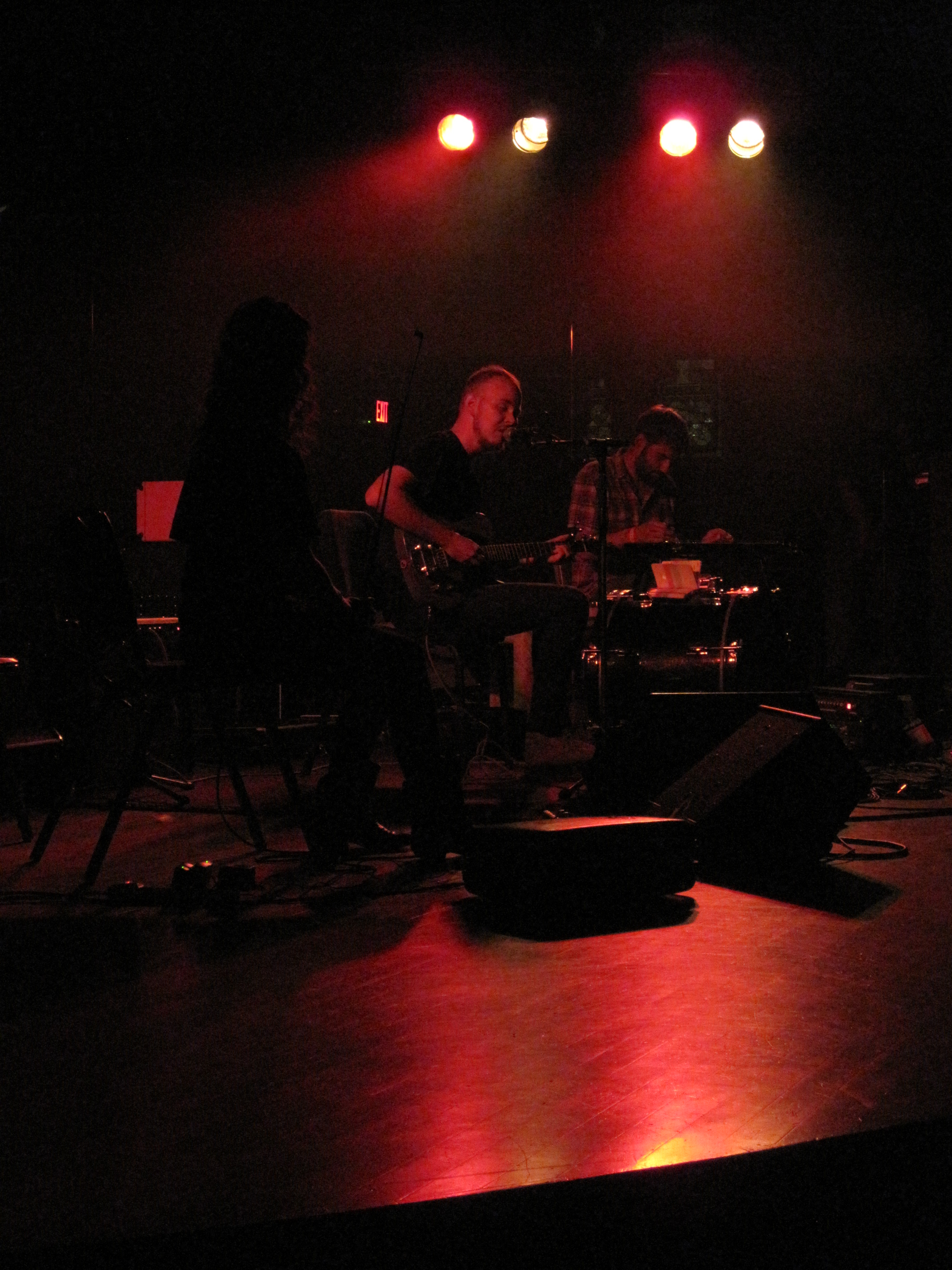
Timber Timbre performing in Fredericton, New Brunswick in 2009

The band's song "Magic Arrow" was featured in the television show Breaking Bad, in the episode "Caballo Sin Nombre", as well as in the television series The Good Wife, in the episode "Bitcoin for Dummies". "Black Water" features on the soundtrack for the 2012 comedy, For a Good Time, Call..., as well Bottom of the World (2017), and in the television series Russian Doll (2019). Their song "Demon Host" was featured in the end credits to the 2013 film The Last Exorcism Part II, in Sarah Polley's documentary Stories We Tell (2012), and in the movie The Gambler (2014).

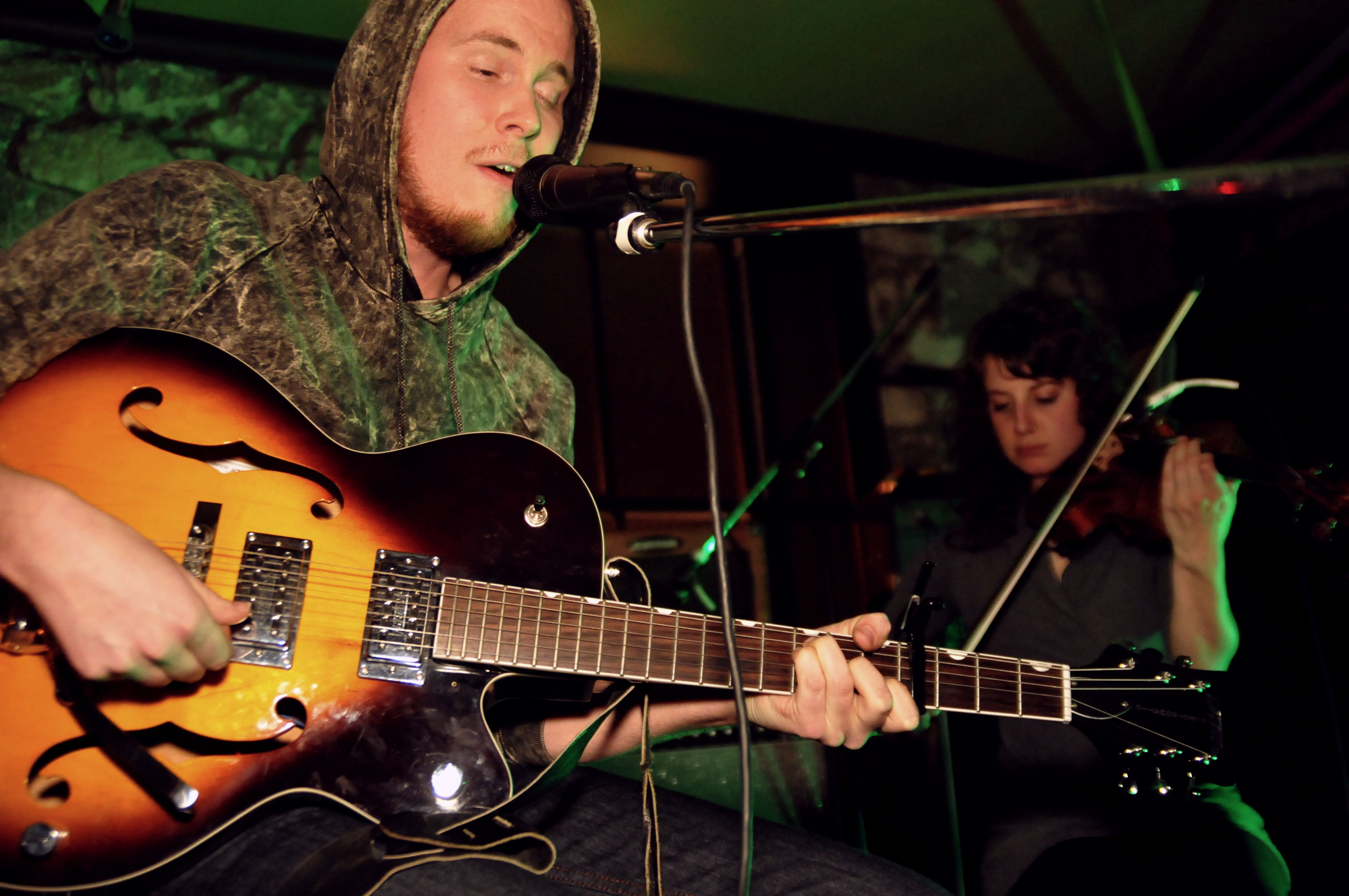
Taylor Kirk of Timber Timbre performing in 2009

The band's fourth album, Creep on Creepin' On, was released in April 2011. It was named as one of ten shortlisted nominees for the 2011 Polaris Music Prize that ultimately went to Arcade Fire's The Suburbs. In 2012, the band supported British folk singer Laura Marling on her UK tour and Canadian singer Feist on her tour of America.

The band's fifth record, Hot Dreams, was released April 1, 2014. It was a shortlisted nominee for the 2014 Polaris Music Prize, which eventually went to Tanya Tagaq's Animism. The song "Run From Me" is featured in the Netflix documentary Wild Wild Country, in the sixth season of Orange Is the New Black, in the second-season episode of The Blacklist titled "The Mombasa Cartel", in an episode from the second season of Good Girls called "The Dubby", and in the trailer for HBO's Barry Season 4. The track "Run From Me" was also featured in season 2, episode 2 of period romantic comedy Our Flag Means Death.

Timber Timbre's sixth album, Sincerely, Future Pollution, was released on April 7, 2017, on City Slang Records. The album's first single, "Sewer Blues", was released in January 2017. The second single, "Velvet Gloves & Spit", was released on February 15, 2017.

In 2021, Timber Timbre digitally released an EP titled Dissociation Tapes, Volume 1 previously available on cassette in 2019.

Timber Timbre's seventh album, Lovage, was released on October 6, 2023, on Integral Music. The album's first single, "Ask the Community", was released in June 2023.

Taylor Kirk died on April 14, 2026, at the age of 44.

== Sound ==
Timber Timbre's sound has been described as "an aesthetic rooted in swampy, ragged blues" and "beautifully restrained blues from an alternate universe", which creates an atmosphere that is cinematic and spooky.

== Members ==
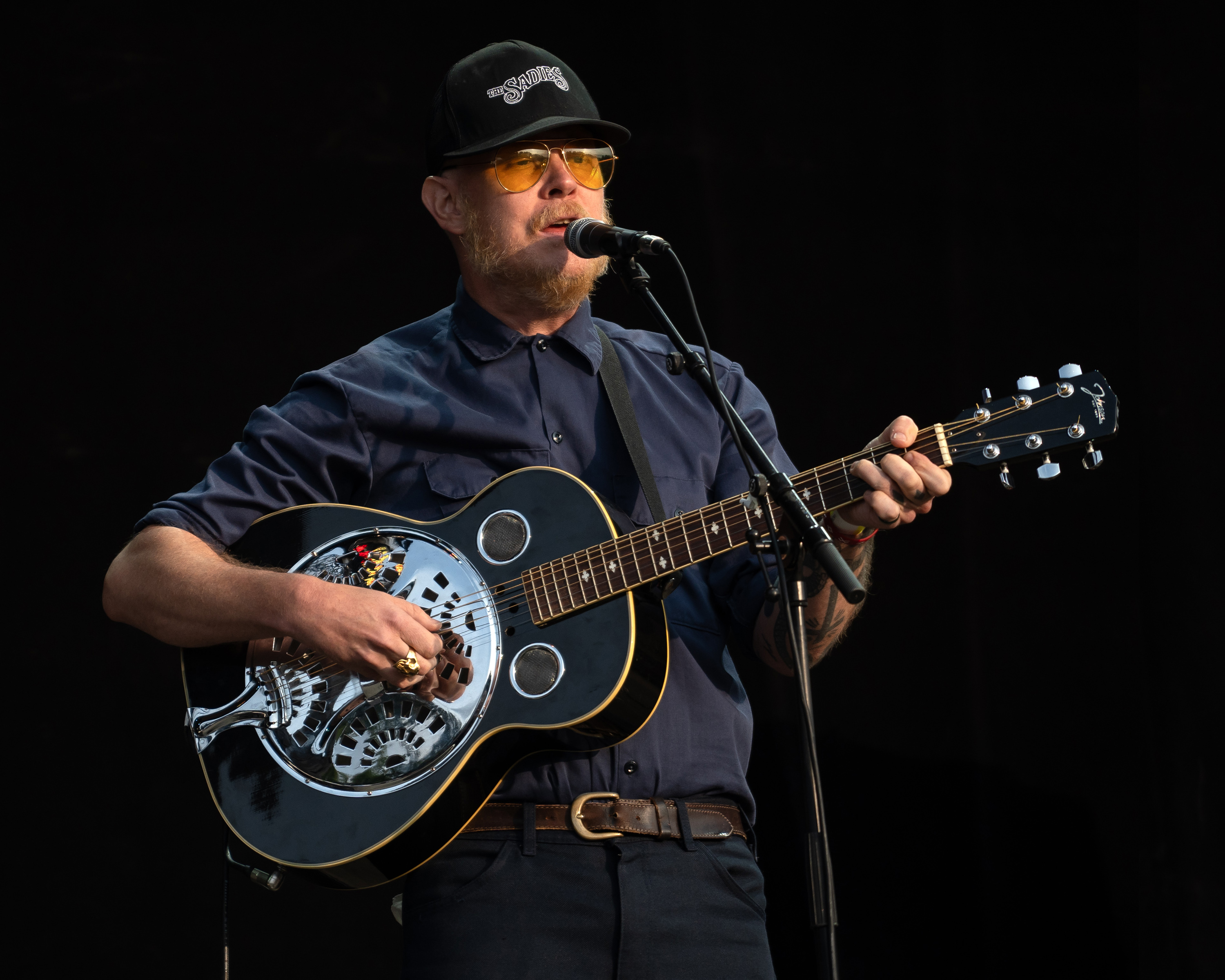
Timber Timbre at La Route du Rock 2024.

- Taylor Kirk – vocals, electric guitar, bass guitar, baritone guitar, drums, keyboards (2005–2026)
- Mika Posen – strings, vocals (2010-2013)
- Simon Trottier – guitar, bass guitar, keyboards (2010-2019)
- Mathieu Charbonneau – keyboards (2013-2019)
- Olivier Fairfield – drums, keyboards (2013-2017)
- Mark Wheaton – drums (2017)
- Michael Dubue – piano, synthesizer, voice (2023-2026)
- Adam Bradley Schreiber – drums, percussion (2023-2026)

== Discography ==
=== Albums ===
Year	Album	Peak positions				
Year	Album	CAN	BEL (Fl)	BEL (Wa)	FRA	SWI
2006	Cedar Shakes	—	—	—	—	—
2007	Medicinals	—	—	—	—	—
2009	Timber Timbre	—	—	—	69	—
2011	Creep on Creepin' On	20	—	70	112	82
2014	Hot Dreams	21	84	48	36	55
2017	Sincerely, Future Pollution	94	76	23	75	36
2023	Lovage	—	—	—	196	—

=== EPs ===
- I Am Coming to Paris (2016)
- Dissociation Tapes, Volume 1 (2019)
- "Interview" Volume I (2025)
- "Interview" Volume II (2025)
- "Interview" Volume II (2025)
- "Interview" Volume IV (2026)

=== Compilation albums ===
- Friends in Bellwoods II (2009): "Water"

=== Other credits ===
Kirk and Trottier also produced albums for other artists, including the full-length debut album by Tasseomancy.
