= Say Us =

Studio album by Zeus
- Released: 23 February 2010
- Recorded: 2009; Toronto
- Genre: Alternative, indie
- Length: 37:31
- Label: Arts & Crafts
- Producer: Carlin Nicholson; Mike O'Brien

Zeus chronology
Sounds Like Zeus (2009)	Say Us (2010)

Say Us is the first full-length studio album by the Canadian indie band Zeus. The vinyl LP was released 9 February 2010, with the CD version released 23 February 2010. A digital download was made available, with the LP version. All three versions were released in Canada by Arts & Crafts Records.

== Critical reception ==
In a positive review of the album, critic Noel Murray of the AV Club said fans of Sloan and of the New Pornographers should "warm immediately to Zeus", and wrote that "after moonlighting from their gig as Jason Collett’s backing band... [they] deserve to move from the side of the stage to the front."

Critic Andrew Leahey wrote that Say Us "re-creates the sunny strains of Sloan, The Hollies, and the Beatles to charming effect."

In a neutral review, critic Pieter J Macmillan wrote that the band's democratic approach to singing and song writing lead to a remarkable coherence of sound throughout the album. However, he continued the album's "lack of originality is felt particularly strong... in the lyrics."

== Track listing ==
No.	Title	Lead vocal	Length
1.	"How Does It Feel?"	O'Brien	2:49
2.	"Fever of the Time"	C. Nicholson	2:38
3.	"Kindergarten"	Quin	2:48
4.	"The Renegade"	O'Brien	3:45
5.	"Greater Times on the Wayside"	Quin	0:59
6.	"The River by the Garden"	O'Brien	3:52
7.	"You Gotta' Teller"	C. Nicholson	3:14
8.	"I Know"	C. Nicholson	3:15
9.	"Marching Through Your Head"	Quin	2:24
10.	"The Sound of You"	O'Brien	3:08
11.	"Heavy on Me"	Quin	4:36
12.	"At the Risk of Repeating"	C. Nicholson	4:03
Total length:			37:31

Japan edition bonus tracks
No.	Title	Length
13.	"Cornerstones"	3:56
14.	"That's All"	3:13
15.	"Mother Mother"	2:56
Total length:		47:37

== Personnel ==
- Rob Drake – drums tracks 3, 7, 9, 10, 11
- Carlin Nicholson – drums tracks 1, 2, 4; Bass tracks 1, 6, 9, 10, 11; Vocal harmony tracks 1, 3, 4, 5, 6, 9, 10, 11; acoustic guitar track 2; piano tracks 2, 12; electric piano track 3
- Mike O'Brien – drums track 12; Bass tracks 3, 7, 12; Vocal harmony tracks 2, 3, 5, 7, 8, 9, 11, 12; electric guitar tracks 1, 2, 5, 6, 7, 8, 9, 11, 12; piano tracks 1, 4, 10
- Neil Quin – drums track 5; Bass track 5; Vocal harmony track 6, 10; acoustic guitar tracks 3, 4, 10; electric guitar tracks 3, 4, 5, 10; piano tracks 9, 10

=== Guest performers ===
- Dave Azzolini – drums track 8; Vocal harmony tracks 2, 4, 8, 9; acoustic guitar track 12; electric guitar tracks 4, 6, 9
- Bryden Baird – trumpet tracks 4, 8
- Peter Elkas – slide guitar track 12
- Jessica Grassia – Vocal harmony tracks 1, 2, 4, 8, 9, 10, 12
- Afie Jurvanen – Vocal harmony track 4; electric guitar tracks 4, 8
- Taylor Knox – drums track 6; Vocal harmony track 2
- Liam Nicholson – Vocal harmony tracks 2, 4; Vocal harmony tracks 2, 4, 10
- Leon Patterson – Vocal harmony track 4; electric guitar track 4

=== Production ===
- Benny Cloutier Jr. – front cover illustration
- Mike O'Brien, Robyn Kotyk, Zeus – design and layout
- Mike O'Brien, Andrea Wilson – plasticine art
- Mike O'Brien, Carlin Nicholson – producer
- Robbie Lackritz – mixing

== Footnotes ==
=== References ===
- Say Us (Booklet). Zeus. Toronto: Arts & Crafts. 2010. A&C051.
- "Say Us - Zeus (2010) > Album Info", Billboard, OCLC 1532948.
