= Zeus (band) =

Canadian indie rock band

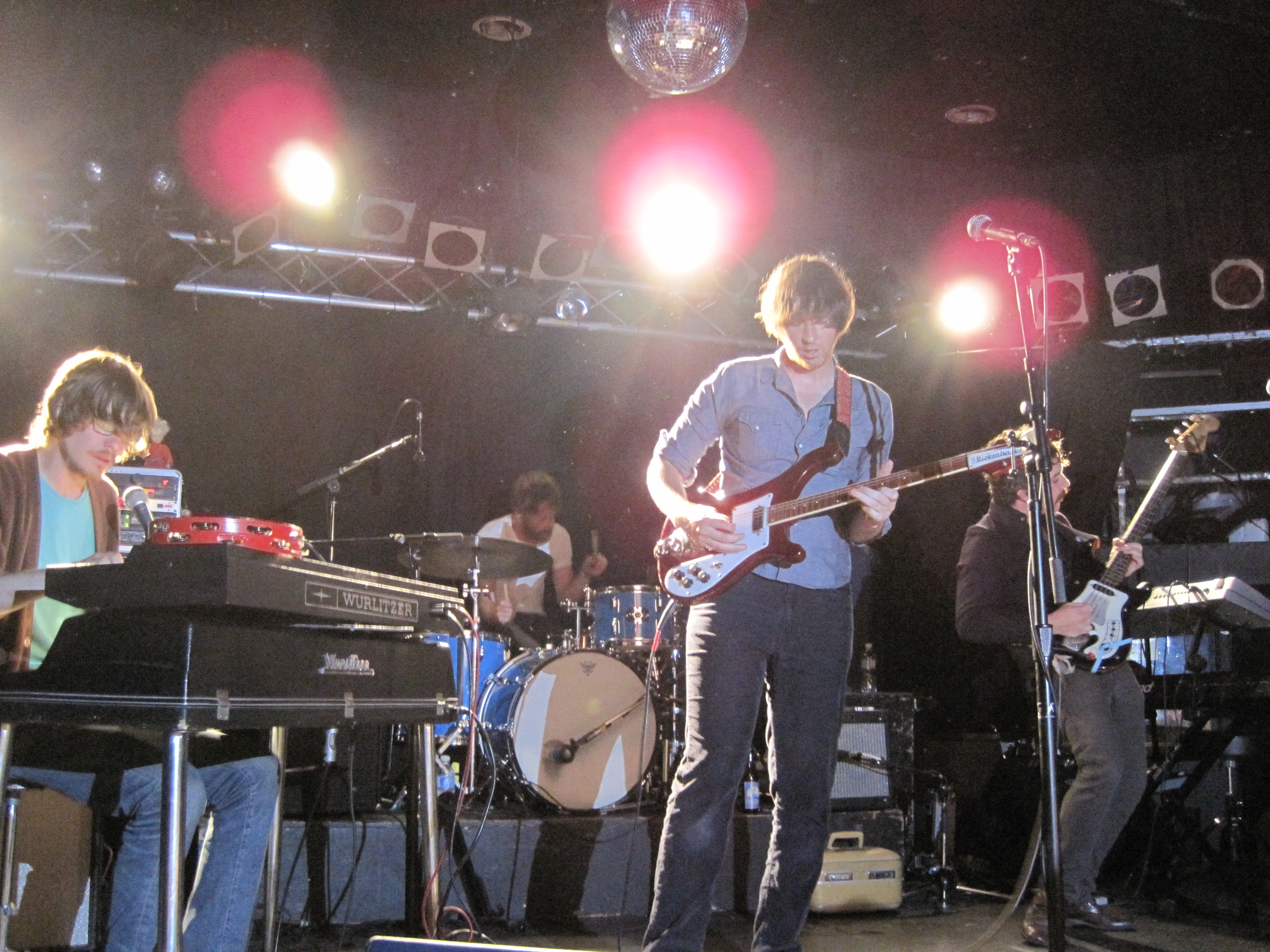
- Zeus, September 2009

Background information
- Origin: Toronto, Ontario, Canada
- Genres: Rock, alternative, indie rock
- Years active: 2009–present
- Label: Arts & Crafts
- Members: Rob Drake; Carlin Nicholson; Mike O'Brien; Neil Quin
- Website: arts-crafts.ca/music/zeus.html

Zeus is a Toronto-based Canadian indie rock band signed to the Arts & Crafts record label. Its members include Rob Drake, Carlin Nicholson, Mike O'Brien, and Neil Quin. The band have released three albums and one EP since 2009. They have also served as the backing band for Canadian musician Jason Collett.

== History ==
O'Brien and Nicholson were childhood friends from Barrie, Ontario, and played in one another's first bands along with Afie Jurvanen. When Jurvanen was recruited by producer Howie Beck to play guitar for Jason Collett, Jurvanen brought along O'Brien and Nicholson, who had learned Collett's album Idols of Exile in its entirety before their audition. The band he brought to Collett, which called itself "Paso Mino" consisted of Jurvanen, Michael P. Clive, and current Zeus members O'Brien and Drake, with Nicholson commonly acting as sound technician. After several years performing behind Collett, as well as performing original material and releasing the album Good People, Paso Mino dissolved when Michael P. Clive left the band to pursue a career as a professional chef, and Jurvanen began a new solo project under the name "Bahamas".

O'Brien and Nicholson began recording together, joined for the original sessions by Dave Azzolini, Jess Grassia and Taylor Knox (The Golden Dogs). Their personal history went back to high school when they formed the band The 68's. Neil Quin (ex-The Golden Dogs) was soon added, completing the Zeus lineup. The members of Zeus continue as Collett's backing band. and toured with Jurvanen in a revue style tour Bonfire Ball Revue, when he described Zeus as sounding like The Band behind Collett, and sounding like Crazy Horse behind Bahamas".

=== Releases ===
Their debut EP Sounds Like Zeus was released by Arts & Crafts in June 2009, and includes a cover of the Genesis song "That's All".

The band's debut album, Say Us, was released 23 February 2010. A vinyl LP was released two weeks ahead of the CD release. Say Us was included on the 2010 Polaris Music Prize long list, but failed to advance to the short list. In March 2010, the band performed at the SxSW Music Festival with long-time collaborators Jason Collett and Bahamas. The band released two 7" singles, "Hot Under The Collar" b/w "Aeroplane" (7 December 2010) and "Permanent Scar" b/w "The Darkness" (12 April 2011).

The second album Busting Visions was released in March 2012 entered the album charts at number 73 in Canada. It was preceded by the single "Are You Gonna Waste My Time?".

Zeus' third full-length album Classic Zeus was released on Arts & Crafts on 2 September 2014.

Zeus' most recent album Credo was released through Arts & Crafts on 8 September 2023. The band released the first single from the new record, "Air I Walk," on June 29, 2023.

== Band members ==
- Rob Drake (2009–present)
- Carlin Nicholson (2009–present)
- Mike O'Brien (2009–present)
- Neil Quin (2009–present)

== Discography ==
=== Studio albums ===
Year	Album
2009	Sounds Like Zeus EP
2010	Say Us
2012	Busting Visions
2014	Classic Zeus
2023	Credo

=== Singles ===
Year	Song	Chart peak		Album
Year	Song	CAN Alt	CAN Rock	Album
2010	"Hot Under the Collar" / "Aeroplane"	46^{1}	—	Non-album single
2011	"Permanent Scar" / "The Darkness"	—	—	Non-album single
2011	"Are You Gonna' Waste My Time?"	38	23	Busting Visions
"—" denotes a release that did not chart.

1. "Hot Under the Collar"

== See also ==
- Music of Canada
- Canadian rock
- List of bands from Canada
- List of Canadian musicians
