= Medicinals =

Studio album by Timber Timbre
- Released: 2007
- Genre: Blues, folk
- Length: 32:00
- Label: Shuffling Feet Records

Timber Timbre chronology
Cedar Shakes (2006)	Medicinals (2007)	Timber Timbre (2009)

Medicinals is the second album by Timber Timbre, released in 2007. The album was initially recorded in Taylor Kirk's apartment in Toronto soon before he moved out, and reflected his own sense of disconnection from the city and his longing for the more rural environment he had recently moved to Toronto from.

According to music journalist Michael Barclay, the album "has much more in common with early Cowboy Junkies recordings than anything heard on classic rock radio -- or even the current indie rock scene Timber Timbre is based in. Considering their dark, haunting sound, it's not hard to believe Kirk when he says that Timber Timbre was born in isolation, while he had cabin fever on a farm outside of Bobcaygeon."

The album was released on Jonas Bonnetta's independent Shuffling Feet Records label.

== Critical response ==
Vish Khanna of Exclaim! asserted that the album "connects the earnest rural bent of Royal City with the post-rock stomp of Bruce Peninsula", writing that "it might purport to be some unknowable old world record but the give away is the contemporary pain within the lyricism and unconventional musical sensibility."

== Track listing ==
No.	Title	Length
1.	"Window Talk"	0:48
2.	"There Is a Cure"	4:32
3.	"Devil's Dress"	3:48
4.	"Like a Mountain"	2:25
5.	"Beat the Dead Horse"	4:52
6.	"Under Your Spell"	3:26
7.	"It Comes Back to Haunt Us"	3:32
8.	"Werewolf"	2:29
9.	"Oh Messiah"	2:44
10.	"Patron Saint Hunter"	3:24
