= Fantasick Impossibliss =

EP by The Most Serene Republic
- Released: 2010
- Genre: Indie
- Label: Home of the Rebels
- Producer: Ryan Lenssen, Dave Newfeld

Fantasick Impossibliss is an EP by The Most Serene Republic released on Home of the Rebels and distributed by Arts & Crafts. It was made available for digital download on May 4, 2010.

== Track listing ==
1. "Comeuppance"
2. "Pink Noise"
3. "Jelly Chamber"
4. "The Church of Acorns"
5. "Ache of Goon"
6. "Fantasick Impossibliss"
