= Haley Blais =

Canadian singer-songwriter

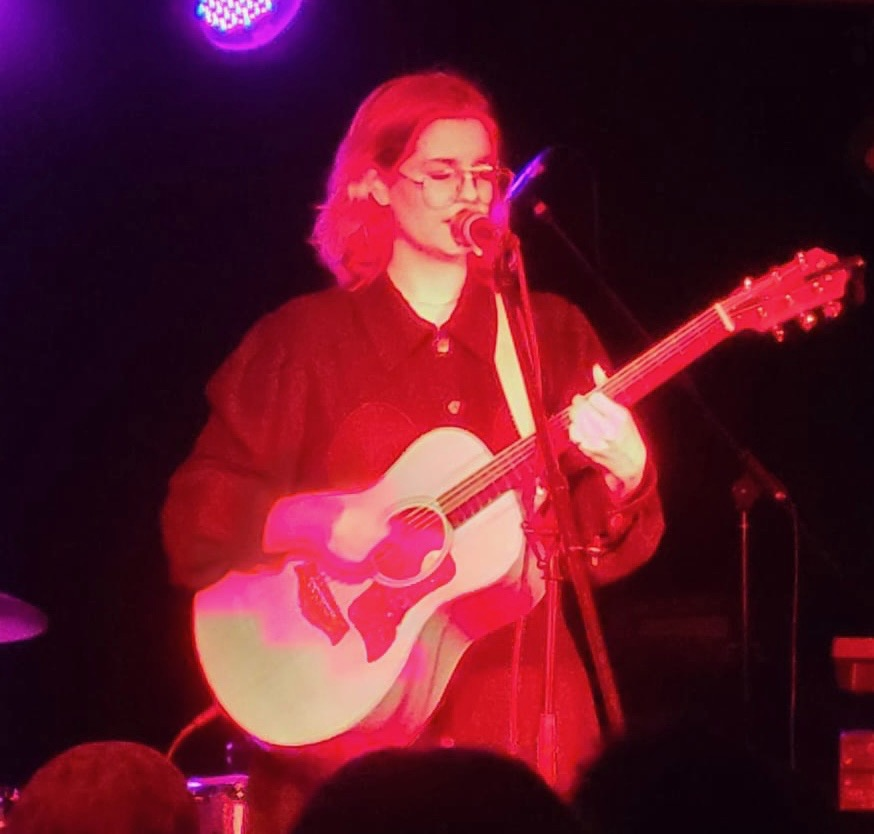
- Blais performing in 2022

Background information
- Born: Haley Nicole Blais
- Genres: Indie rock
- Years active: 2016–present
- Labels: Arts & Crafts Productions, Tiny Kingdom
- Website: haleyblaismusic.com

Haley Nicole Blais is a Canadian singer-songwriter from Vancouver.

Blais got her start on Youtube, uploading vlogs, original songs, and covers. She received mainstream success with the release of the single "Small Foreign Faction" in 2018. Since then, she has released two full length LPs and toured throughout North America and Europe. Blais' music has been described as "confessional" "nostalgia-pop" with a particular emphasis on her vocals.

== History ==
Haley Blais grew up in Kelowna, British Columbia. She is a classically trained vocalist and toured in a opera troupe when she was a teenager. After leaving opera and moving to Vancouver, she began recording her own music, releasing the EP Late Bloomer in 2016.

In 2018, off of the success of her EP Let Yourself Go, Blais embarked on her first national tour. She has since toured North America supporting Peach Pit, The Beaches, and The Greeting Committee as well as headlining tours in the UK and Ireland.

In 2020, Blais released her debut full-length album, Below the Salt. The album was acclaimed and described as "multi-layered and lush" and "dreamy," capturing "the essence of growing up."

In 2023, Blais signed with Arts & Crafts Productions, which released her sophomore LP Wisecrack on September 15, 2023. The album was longlisted for the 2024 Polaris Music Prize.

Blais also plays bass and contributes backing vocals to the Vancouver-based band Babe Corner.

In 2026, Blais and Sam Lynch formed the duo True Mountain Laurel. Their debut album, Angel So Bad, is scheduled for release on August 28, 2026, through Birthday Cake Records.

== Discography ==
=== Albums ===
Title	Details
Below the Salt	Release date: August 25, 2020; Label: Tiny Kingdom
Wisecrack	Release date: September 15, 2023; Label: Arts & Crafts Productions

=== with True Mountain Laurel ===
Title	Details
Angel So Bad	Release date: August 28, 2026; Label: Birthday Cake

=== EPs ===
Title	Details
Late Bloomer	Release date: October 26, 2016
Zero Charisma (Demos)	Release date: January 15, 2018
Let Yourself Go	Release date: April 7, 2018

=== Singles ===
Title	Year	Album
"Late Bloomer"	2016	Late Bloomer
"Small Foreign Faction"	2018	Let Yourself Go
"Too Good"	2020	Below the Salt
"On a Weekend"	2020	Below the Salt
"Rob the Original"	2020	Below the Salt
"Auld Lang Syne"	2020	Non-album single
"Coolest Fucking Bitch in Town"	2022	Wisecrack
"Survivor's Guilt"	2022	Wisecrack
"Matchmaker"	2023	Wisecrack
"Baby Teeth"	2023	Wisecrack
"The Cabin"	2023	Wisecrack
