= Sincerely, Future Pollution =

Studio album by Timber Timbre
- Released: April 7, 2017
- Length: 39:59
- Label: City Slang

Timber Timbre chronology
Hot Dreams (2014)	Sincerely, Future Pollution (2017)

Singles from Sincerely, Future Pollution
- 1. "Sewer Blues" Released: January 17, 2017; 2. "Velvet Gloves & Spit" Released: February 15, 2017; 3. "Grifting" Released: March 24, 2017

Professional ratings
Aggregate scores
Source	Rating
Metacritic	78/100
Review scores
Source	Rating
AllMusic	3.5/5 stars

Sincerely, Future Pollution is the sixth studio album by Canadian band Timber Timbre, released on April 7, 2017, on City Slang Records. In January 2017, the band released the first single from the album: "Sewer Blues". The second single, "Velvet Gloves & Spit", was released on February 15, 2017.

== Track listing ==
No.	Title	Length
1.	"Velvet Gloves & Spit"	4:34
2.	"Grifting"	4:21
3.	"Skin Tone"	3:11
4.	"Moment"	5:45
5.	"Sewer Blues"	4:37
6.	"Western Questions"	4:40
7.	"Sincerely, Future Pollution"	4:01
8.	"Bleu Nuit"	4:05
9.	"Floating Cathedral"	4:45

== Charts ==
Chart (2017)	Peak position
Belgian Albums (Ultratop Flanders)	76
Belgian Albums (Ultratop Wallonia)	32
Canadian Albums (Billboard)	94
French Albums (SNEP)	75
Swiss Albums (Schweizer Hitparade)	36
