= The Most Serene Republic =

Canadian indie rock music group

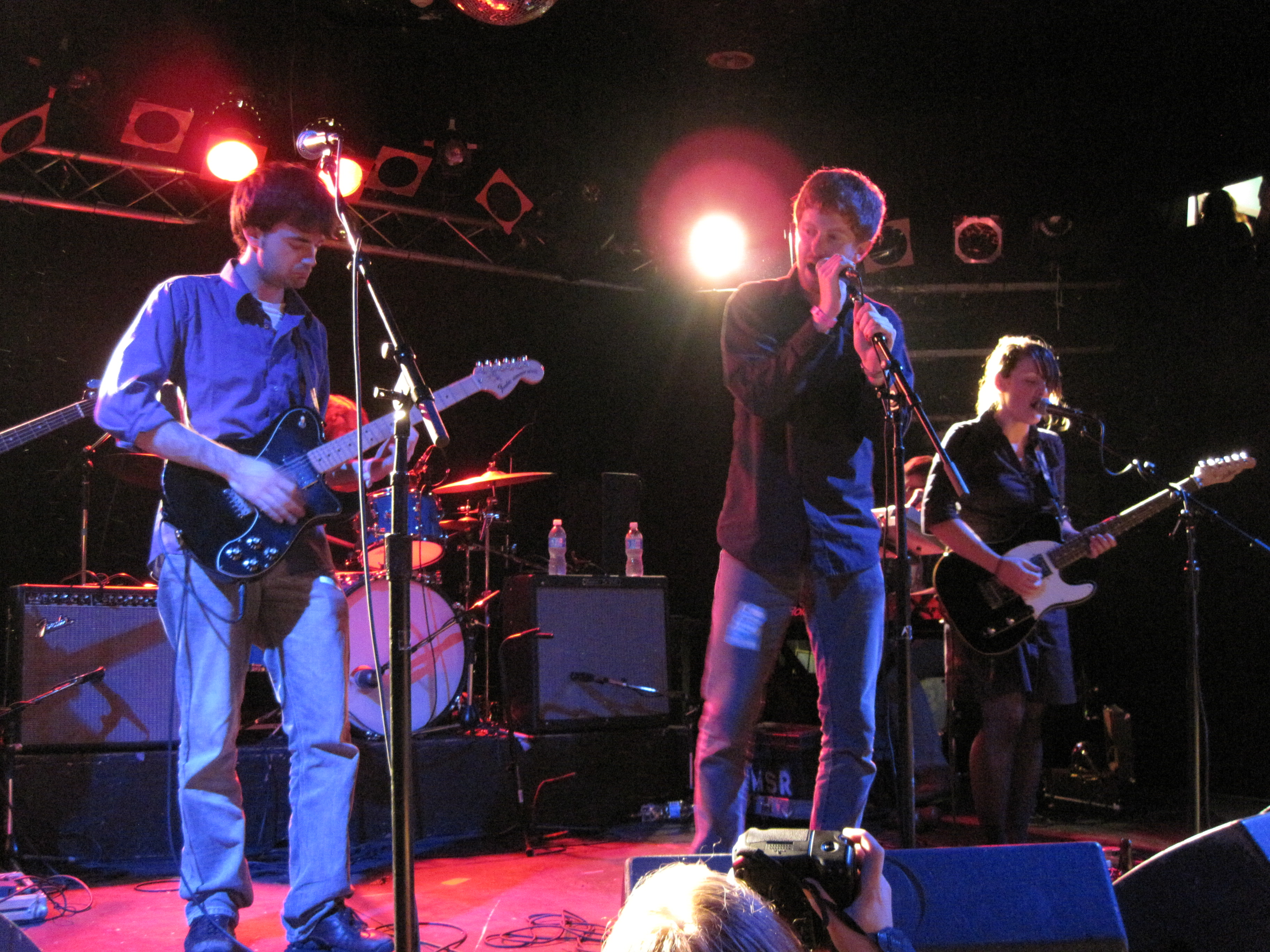
- The Most Serene Republic, September 2009

Background information
- Origin: Milton, Ontario, Canada
- Genres: Indie rock Baroque pop Post-rock
- Years active: 2003–present
- Labels: MapleMusic Recordings; Home of the Rebels; Arts & Crafts
- Members: Adrian Jewett; Ryan Lenssen; Nick Greaves; Sean Woolven; Simon Lukasewich
- Past members: Peter Van Helvoort; Andrew McArthur; Tony Nesbitt-Larking; Adam Nimmo; Emma Ditchburn; Adam Balsam
- Website: themostserenerepublic.com

The Most Serene Republic is a Canadian indie rock music group formed in 2003 in Milton, Ontario. The band takes its name from the sobriquet of Venice under the Doges, which was regarded as "The Most Serene Republic of Venice".

== History ==
The roots of the band were planted in 2003 when Ryan Lenssen and Adrian Jewett formed Thee Oneironauts (O-nye-rawn-nauts). The pair recorded and self-released an EP entitled Night of the Lawnchairs on the GROK Studios imprint, which had also released Lenssen's concept band "Rushing To Redlights". The Oneironauts grew to trio status with the addition of Nick Greaves on guitar before ultimately becoming The Most Serene Republic.

Their debut album Underwater Cinematographer was produced, mixed and engineered by Lenssen and mastered by Ryan A. Mills and recorded at ASF Studios. Its original release was in late 2004 on the independent label Sunday League Records before being picked up by Arts & Crafts. It was re-released on June 28, 2005, featuring new artwork. They were the first band signed by Arts & Crafts that was not related to Broken Social Scene. After touring the album extensively with Metric, Stars and Broken Social Scene, the band recorded what ultimately became the Phages EP, that was first made available when the band supported The Strokes on their Canadian tour of 2006.

In 2006, long-time drummer Adam Nimmo left the band, replaced by Tony Nesbitt-Larking. The latter appeared on Population and toured with the band throughout 2008. TMSR spent much of 2007 prepping their second album, Population, which was released by Arts & Crafts on October 2, 2007, to generally positive reviews.

In 2007, Jewett and Lenssen appeared on MTV Live to promote the release of Population. This would be the band's first television appearance. The two were interviewed during the airing of Making the Band wearing Star Trek outfits. During the interview they said they were on their way to a Star Trek convention following the interview. In 2008, the full band appeared on MTV Live for an interview and three-song performance.

In an interview from June 17, 2008, guitarist Nick Greaves stated that the band will be recording their third album with Broken Social Scene and Super Furry Animals producer David Newfeld, and hinted there might be a slight change of musical direction.

2008 saw the release of Live at XMU, a four-song acoustic EP made up of songs from Population and Phages. It was recorded December 11, 2007, at the XMU studios in Washington, D.C., and released on August 12, 2008, exclusively to iTunes.

On April 20, 2009, the band announced their newest album, ...And The Ever Expanding Universe, would be released on July 14, and offered the album's second track, "Heavens to Purgatory", as a free download. In addition, they announced that an EP of 16-bit remixes entitled Digital Population would be released on April 28.

On August 14, their song "Humble Peasants" was featured in the trailer for A Generation After Genocide, a documentary about the healing power of soccer in Rwanda.

Their video "Heavens to Purgatory" was directed by Ben Steiger-Levine and was nominated for Video of the Year at the 2010 Juno Awards.

The band released Pre Serene: Thee Oneironauts, a remastered compilation of material recorded by the band's direct ancestor, Thee Oneironauts in the latter half of 2003, on May 24, 2011.

The Most Serene Republic have announced a return to action with their first new album in six years, Mediac, which was released on November 13, 2015, on MapleMusic Recordings. Mediac was recorded in Toronto, produced by TMSR's Ryan Lenssen, and mixed by David Newfeld.

On October 27, 2021, the band announced the passing of longtime friend and drummer Adam Balsam; he was 41.

== Band members ==
=== Current ===
- Adrian Jewett – vocals, trombone (2003–present)
- Ryan Lenssen – piano, backup vocals (2003–present)
- Nick Greaves – guitar, EBow, banjo (2003–present)
- Sean Woolven – guitar, backup vocals, (2004, 2006–present)
- Simon Lukasewich – bass, violin (2006–present)

=== Former ===
- Peter Van Helvoort – guitar (2004)
- Andrew McArthur – bass (2004–2006)
- Tony Nesbitt-Larking – drums (2006–2008)
- Adam Nimmo – drums (2004–2006), (2008)
- Emma Ditchburn – guitar, vocals (2004–2009)
- Adam Balsam – drums (2009–2021; died 2021)

== Discography ==
=== Studio albums ===
- 2005: Underwater Cinematographer (Arts & Crafts)
- 2007: Population (Arts & Crafts)
- 2009: ...And the Ever Expanding Universe (Arts & Crafts)
- 2011: Pre Serene: Thee Oneironauts (Home of the Rebels)
- 2015: Mediac (MapleMusic Recordings)

=== EPs ===
- 2006: Phages
- 2008: Live at XMU - Acoustic EP
- 2009: Digital Population
- 2010: Fantasick Impossibliss (Home of the Rebels)

=== 7"s ===
- 2006: "Content Was Always My Favorite Color" b/w "Tragedy of the Commons"
- 2006: The Most Serene Republic / Headlights [Split]

=== Videography ===
- "Content Was Always My Favourite Color" (2006, Underwater Cinematographer)
- "Oh (God)" (2007, Underwater Cinematographer)
- "The Men Who Live Upstairs" (2008, Population)
- "Heavens to Purgatory" (2009, ...And the Ever Expanding Universe)
- "Jelly Chamber" (2010, Fantasick Impossibliss)

== See also ==
- List of bands from Canada
