= Mika Posen =

Canadian violinist and music instructor

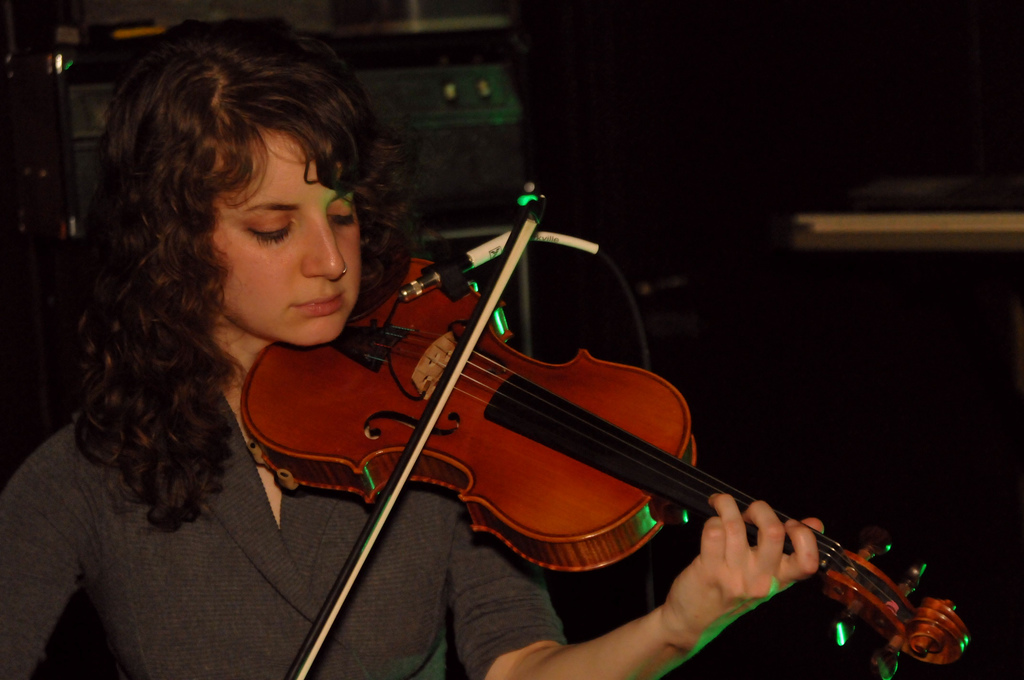
- Posen performing with Timber Timbre in 2009

Background information
- Born: Ottawa, Ontario, Canada
- Instruments: violin, viola
- Website: mikaposen.com

Mika Posen is a Canadian violinist and music instructor based in Ottawa. She is known for collaborating and performing with acts including Timber Timbre, Agnes Obel, and Forest City Lovers and performs as a solo artist under the name Merganzer. Her first solo album, Mirror Maze was released in 2015 and was recorded over the course of several years in Berlin, Germany. A second solo album, Montage was released in 2019.

Posen grew up in Ottawa and is the daughter of Canadian singer and songwriter Shelley Posen. She left at 18 and spent several years living in Guelph, Toronto, and Berlin. Posen completed a double degree in music and biology at the University of Guelph and obtained a master's degree in ethnomusicology at York University. She returned to Ottawa in 2017 in part due to the rising costs associated with living in Toronto.
