= Arts & Crafts Productions =

Canadian media and artist services company

Arts & Crafts
- Parent company: Arts & Crafts Productions
- Founded: 2003
- Founder: Kevin Drew; Jeffrey Remedios
- Distributors: Caroline Distribution (US); Universal Music Canada (Canada)
- Genre: Indie
- Country of origin: Canada
- Location: Toronto, Ontario
- Official website: arts-crafts.ca

Arts & Crafts Productions is a Canadian music-focused media and artist services company that offers services as an independent record label, management firm, merchandiser, and publisher worldwide. It has earned 21 Juno Awards. Arts & Crafts has been called one of Canada's most important record labels.

== History ==
=== Founding ===
Arts & Crafts (also referred to as "A&C") was launched as a music company in 2003 by friends Jeffrey Remedios & Daniel Cutler both former Virgin Records executives as well as Kevin Drew, who co-founded flagship group Broken Social Scene (BSS) with Brendan Canning. The partnership was originally intended as a vehicle for self-release and artist management of Broken Social Scene's breakthrough album You Forgot It in People, and the structure quickly formed as a platform to release albums and manage the careers of artists directly affiliated with members of Broken Social Scene. In addition to BSS albums, the label's first releases were by Stars, Jason Collett, Feist, Apostle of Hustle and Valley of the Giants.

=== Growth ===
In 2005 The Most Serene Republic was the first band unrelated to Broken Social Scene to sign to Arts & Crafts and officially marked a shift of scope broader than the projects related to Broken Social Scene.

A&C began its foray into the digital music business with the launch of GalleryAC.com, a boutique web store that offered digital downloads and Arts & Crafts related merchandise, in 2005. They were one of the first labels to launch a digital download store.

In 2004, Remedios expanded the operation into Montreal basing himself out of the offices of DKD who later partnered to form Arts & Crafts International, releasing the gold-selling album Set Yourself on Fire by Montreal-based group, Stars.

Arts & Crafts was among the first labels to offer a strategy for combating advance music leaks by offering Stars follow-up album In Our Bedroom After the War for sale before promotional copies were ever manufactured and distributed by issuing wide release as a digital download only 3 days following album completion.

In 2009 Rolling Stone cited Remedios as a key insider reshaping the future of the music biz.

On 5 April 2017, Caroline Distribution became the US distributor for the Arts & Crafts label in the US. The label was previously distributed by RED Distribution in the US. EMI Music Canada previously distributed the label in Canada, when, in 2013, EMI Music Canada was merged into Universal Music Canada.

=== Recent history ===
Arts & Crafts Music (also known as GalleryAC Music) controls or administers the publishing rights to much of the music released by the Arts & Crafts label.

On 14 January 2013, Arts & Crafts announced it would be holding the Field Trip Arts & Crafts Music Festival to commemorate their ten-year anniversary. Signed on to headline are Arts & Crafts labelmates Broken Social Scene, Feist, and Stars. Along with the festival celebration, Arts & Crafts released a rarities compilation titled, Arts & Crafts: 2003–2013. The compilation was released as a double album or four LPs and included selected rarities from across the Arts & Crafts catalog. A second compilation album, Arts & Crafts: X, was released in May and featured newly recorded collaborations between A&C artists.

== The "Toronto Music Scene" ==
The 2009 release of This Book Is Broken (House of Anansi Press) documented the rise of Toronto indie bands, focusing especially on Broken Social Scene and the Arts & Crafts roster.

== The Arts & Crafts aesthetic ==
Design and art are important to the company, and are taken as another medium of artistic expression that the label supports.

A&C has been nominated for five JUNO Awards for Album Artwork of the Year. In 2006 it was nominated for Broken Social Scene: Broken Social Scene (Louise Upperton (Director/Designer); Christopher Mills, Kevin Drew, Justin Peroff (Illustrators)), in 2009 for Constantines: Kensington Heights (Dallas Wherle, Robyn Kotyk and Alex Vs. Alex). In 2011, Kotyk, Peroff, Charles Spearin, Joe McKay, Jimmy Collins and Elisabeth Chicoine were awarded the Recording Package of the Year Juno for Broken Social Scene's Forgiveness Rock Record box set and in 2012 for Timber Timbre's Creep on Creepin' On and Feist's Metals both earned nominations in the category.

In 2014, Arts & Crafts designers Kotyk, Peroff, and Petra Cuschieri won another Recording Package of the Year Juno Award for "Arts & Crafts: 2003–2013" 4x LP compilation album.

== Gold & platinum certifications ==
Broken Social Scene Broken Social Scene

Country	Certification	Sales/shipments
Canada	Gold	50,000

Stars Set Yourself On Fire

Country	Certification	Sales/shipments
Canada	Gold	50,000

Broken Social Scene You Forgot It in People

Country	Certification	Sales/shipments
Canada	Gold	50,000

Feist Let It Die

Country	Certification	Sales/shipments
Canada	Platinum	100,000

Feist The Reminder

Country	Certification	Sales/shipments
Canada	2× Platinum	200,000

Feist Metals

Country	Certification	Sales/shipments
Canada	Gold	50,000

== Awards and accolades ==
=== Juno Awards ===
The Juno Awards are presented by the Canadian Academy of Recording Arts and Sciences.

Year	Nominee / work	Award	Result
2003	Broken Social Scene, You Forgot It in People	Alternative Album of the Year	Won
2004	Broken Social Scene, "Stars and Sons"	Video of the Year	Nominated
2004	Stars, Heart	Alternative Album of the Year	Nominated
2005	Feist, "One Evening"	Video of the Year	Nominated
2005	Feist, Let It Die	Alternative Album of the Year	Won
2005	Feist	New Artist of the Year	Won
2005	Stars, Set Yourself on Fire	Alternative Album of the Year	Nominated
2006	Broken Social Scene, Broken Social Scene	Alternative Album of the Year	Won
2006	Broken Social Scene, Broken Social Scene	CD/DVD Artwork Design of the Year	Nominated
2006	Feist, "Inside and Out"	Single of the Year	Nominated
2008	Feist, The Reminder	Album of the Year	Won
2008	Feist, The Reminder	Pop Album of the Year	Won
2008	Feist, "1,2,3,4"	Single of the Year	Won
2008	Feist	Songwriter of the Year	Won
2008	Feist	Artist of the Year	Won
2009	The Stills, Oceans Will Rise	Alternative Album of the Year	Won
2009	The Stills	New Group of the Year	Won
2009	Constantines, Kensington Heights	Recording Package of the Year	Nominated
2009	Feist	Juno Fan Choice Award	Nominated
2009	Feist, "Honey Honey"	Video of the Year	Won
2010	Amy Millan, Masters of the Burial	Adult Alternative Album of the Year	Nominated
2010	Amy Millan, Masters of the Burial	Recording Package of the Year	Nominated
2010	Bell Orchestre, As Seen Through Windows	Instrumental Album of the Year	Won
2010	Charles Spearin, The Happiness Project	Contemporary Jazz Album of the Year	Won
2010	The Most Serene Republic, "Heavens to Purgatory"	Video of the Year	Nominated
2011	Broken Social Scene, Forgiveness Rock Record	Alternative Album of the Year	Nominated
2011	Broken Social Scene	Group of the Year	Nominated
2011	Broken Social Scene, Forgiveness Rock Record	Recording Package of the Year	Won
2011	Broken Social Scene, This Movie Is Broken	Music DVD of the Year	Nominated
2011	Broken Social Scene, "Forced to Love"	Video of the Year	Nominated
2011	Chilly Gonzales, Ivory Tower	Electronic Album of the Year	Nominated
2012	Dan Mangan, Oh Fortune	Alternative Album of the Year	Won
2012	Dan Mangan	New Artist of the Year	Won
2012	Dan Mangan	Songwriter of the Year	Nominated
2012	Dan Mangan, "Rows of Houses"	Video of the Year	Nominated
2012	Feist, Metals	Adult Alternative Album of the Year	Won
2012	Feist	Artist of the Year	Won
2012	Feist	Songwriter of the Year	Nominated
2012	Feist, Look at What the Light Did Now	Music DVD of the Year	Won
2012	Timber Timbre, Creep on Creepin' On	Alternative Album of the Year	Nominated
2012	Timber Timbre, Creep on Creepin' On	Recording Package of the Year	Nominated
2013	Trust	Electronic Artist of the Year	Nominated
2013	Cold Specks	Breakthrough Artist of the Year	Nominated
2014	Arts & Crafts: 2003–2013	Recording Package of the Year	Won
2014	Hayden, Us Alone	Adult Alternative Album of the Year	Nominated
2014	The Darcys, Warring	Alternative Album of the Year	Nominated
2015	Timber Timbre, Hot Dreams	Alternative Album of the Year	Nominated
2015	Timber Timbre, Hot Dreams	Recording Package of the Year	Nominated
2016	Tobias Jesso Jr., Goon	Adult Alternative Album of the Year	Nominated
2016	Frazey Ford, Indian Ocean	Contemporary Roots Album of the Year	Nominated
2016	Dan Mangan + Blacksmith, Club Meds	Recording Package of the Year	Nominated
2017	Andy Shauf	Breakthrough Artist of the Year	Nominated
2017	Gord Downie	Songwriter of the Year	Won
2017	Andy Shauf, The Party	Adult Alternative Album of the Year	Nominated
2017	Gord Downie, Secret Path	Adult Alternative Album of the Year	Won
2017	Jacques Greene, You Can't Deny	Dance Recording of the Year	Nominated
2017	Andy Shauf, The Party	Recording Engineer of the Year	Nominated
2017	Gord Downie, Secret Path	Recording Package of the Year	Won
2017	Gord Downie, "The Stranger"	Video of the Year	Nominated
2018	Broken Social Scene	Breakthrough Artist of the Year	Nominated
2018	Gord Downie, Introduce Yerself	Adult Alternative Album of the Year	Won
2018	Gord Downie	Artist of the Year	Won
2018	Timber Timbre, Sincerely, Future Pollution	Adult Alternative Album of the Year	Nominated
2018	Gord Downie + Kevin Drew	Songwriter of the Year	Won
2018	Kid Koala, Music To Draw To: Satellite	Electronic Album of the Year	Nominated
2019	Dan Mangan, More or Less	Adult Alternative Album of the Year	Nominated
2019	Fucked Up, Dose Your Dreams	Alternative Album of the Year	Nominated
2019	Jacques Greene, Avatar Beach	Dance Recording of the Year	Nominated
2019	Said The Whale, UnAmerican	Recording Engineer of the Year	Nominated

=== Polaris Music Prize ===
The Polaris Music Prize is awarded annually to the best full-length Canadian album based on artistic merit.

Year	Nominee / work	Award	Result
2006	Broken Social Scene, Broken Social Scene	Polaris Music Prize	Nominated
2007	Feist, The Reminder	Polaris Music Prize	Nominated
2008	Stars, In Our Bedroom After the War	Polaris Music Prize	Nominated
2010	Broken Social Scene, Forgiveness Rock Record	Polaris Music Prize	Nominated
2011	Timber Timbre, Creep on Creepin' On	Polaris Music Prize	Nominated
2012	Cold Specks, I Predict a Graceful Expulsion	Polaris Music Prize	Nominated
2012	Feist, Metals	Polaris Music Prize	Won
2014	Timber Timbre, Hot Dreams	Polaris Music Prize	Nominated
2015	Tobias Jesso Jr, Goon	Polaris Music Prize	Nominated
2016	Andy Shauf, The Party	Polaris Music Prize	Nominated
2017	Gord Downie, Secret Path	Polaris Music Prize	Nominated
2018	Jean-Michel Blais, Dans ma main	Polaris Music Prize	Nominated
2020	nêhiyawak, nipiy	Polaris Music Prize	Nominated

=== Canadian Music Awards ===
The Canadian Music and Broadcast Industry Awards happen every March in Toronto as part of Canadian Music Week.

Year	Nominee / work	Award	Result
2008	Arts & Crafts	Independent Label of the Year	Won
2009	Arts & Crafts	Independent Label of the Year	Won
2011	Arts & Crafts	Independent Label of the Year	Won
2012	Arts & Crafts	Independent Label of the Year	Won
2013	Arts & Crafts	Management Company of the Year	Won
2014	Arts & Crafts	Management Company of the Year	Won

== Other ventures ==
In 2008 Arts & Crafts opened Arts & Crafts México and are recognized as the first independent music company to focus on the independent music market in Mexico, releasing albums by the A&C North American roster as well as being the Mexican home to a number of other successful artists such as Sonic Youth, Bright Eyes, M. Ward, Metric, and The Dears.

Arts & Crafts also has a publishing side which represents the rights and royalties of several artists and writers not signed to the label. The roster as of 2026 includes The Beaches, Lowell, Dear Rouge, Jordan Klassen, Blonde Diamond, and more.

== Artists ==
- The American Analog Set
- Aphasia
- Apostle of Hustle
- Astral Swans
- Babygirl
- BadBadNotGood (Canada only)
- Tim Baker
- Bam Bam (Mexico only)
- Bell Orchestre
- Black English (Canada only)
- Jean-Michel Blais
- Haley Blais
- Bloc Party (Canada only)
- Broken Social Scene
- Busty and the Bass
- Carca (Mexico only)
- Matthew Cardinal
- Chikita Violenta
- Chilly Gonzales
- Cold Specks (Canada only)
- Jason Collett
- Constantines
- The Cribs (North America only)
- The Darcys
- The Dears (Currently Mexico only)
- Deer Tick (Canada only)
- Seán Devlin
- Gord Downie and the Sadies
- The Drums (Canada only)
- Ellevator
- Farao (Canada only)
- Feist (Canada only)
- Fleet Foxes (Mexico only)
- Foxwarren
- FRIGS
- Fucked Up (Canada only)
- Gabrielle Shonk (Canada only)
- Girls (Mexico only)
- Gold & Youth
- Hayden
- HAERTS
- Georgia Harmer
- Sarah Harmer
- The Hidden Cameras
- Charlie Houston
- In the Valley Below (Canada only)
- Japandroids (Canada only)
- Tobias Jesso Jr (Canada only)
- Kid Koala
- Andy Kim
- La Force
- Leif Erikson
- Liza Anne
- Los Campesinos! (North America only)
- Calvin Love
- Lowell
- Mia Maestro
- Dan Mangan
- Majical Cloudz (Canada only)
- Memphis
- Metric (Mexico only)
- Amy Millan
- Moby (Canada only)
- The Most Serene Republic
- nêhiyawak
- Neon Indian (Mexico only)
- No Joy (Canada only)
- OMBIIGIZI
- Overcoats
- Pavement (Mexico only)
- Phoenix (North America only)
- Julian Plenti (Mexico only)
- Ra Ra Riot (Canada only)
- Jay Reatard (Mexico only)
- Reuben and the Dark
- Rey Pila
- Lucy Rose
- Röyksopp (Canada only)
- Said the Whale
- Sally Seltmann a.k.a. New Buffalo
- Andy Shauf (Canada only)
- Samantha Savage Smith
- Snowblink
- Charles Spearin
- Stars
- Stephen Malkmus and the Jicks
- Still Life Still
- The Stills
- Tamino (Canada/US only)
- Tei Shi
- Timber Timbre
- Torres
- TR/ST
- Tricky
- Valley of the Giants
- Walrus
- M. Ward (Mexico only)
- Washed Out
- Win Win
- Years
- Yo La Tengo (Mexico only)
- Young Galaxy
- Zeus
- Zulu Winter (Canada & Mexico only)
