= Metric discography =

Discography of Canadian rock band Metric

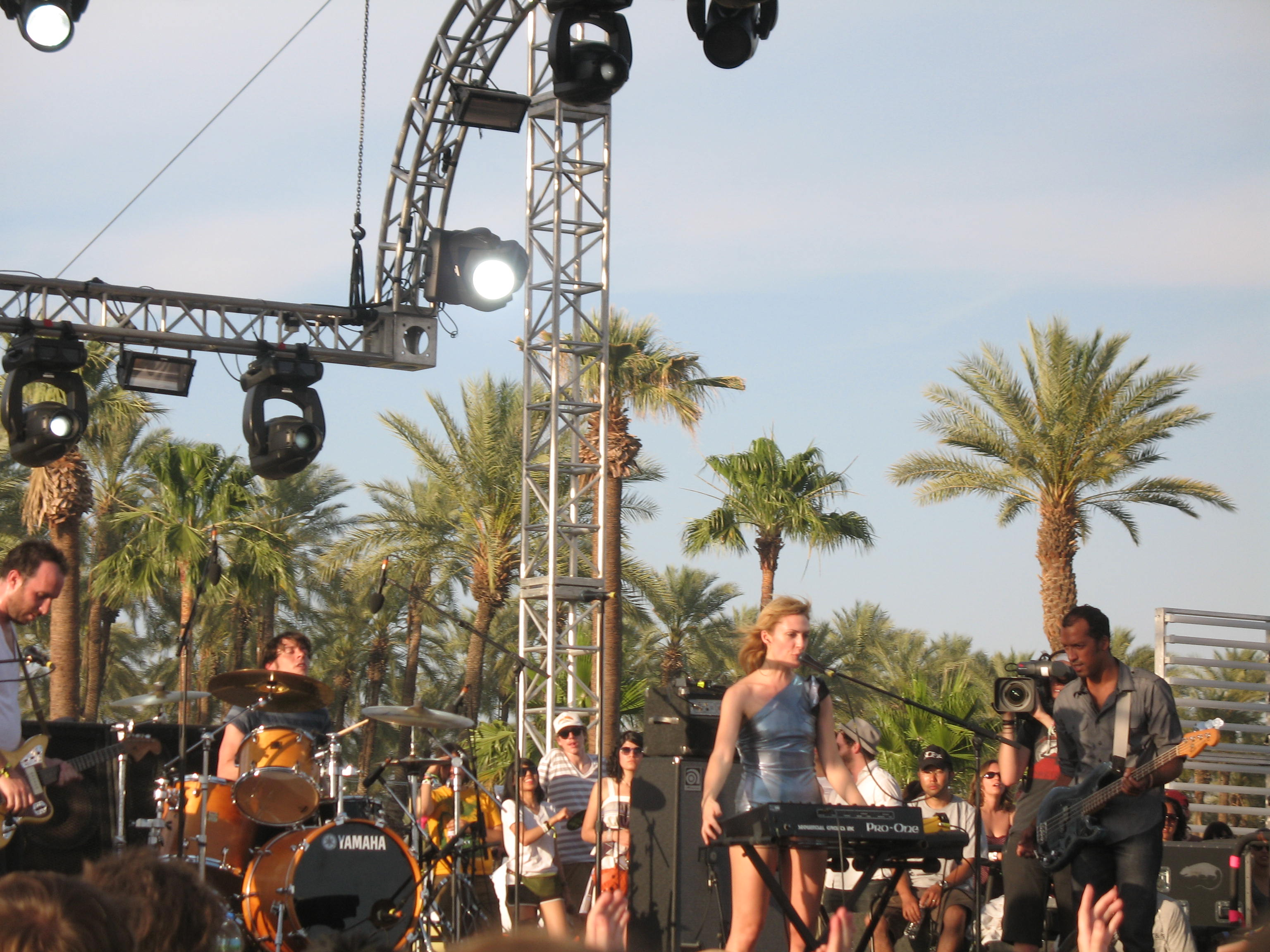
- Metric, Coachella Festival, April 2008; From left to right: James Shaw, Joules Scott-Key, Emily Haines, Joshua Winstead
- Studio albums: 9
- Extended plays: 7
- Soundtrack albums: 3
- Singles: 25
- Video albums: 2
- Music videos: 38

Canadian indie rock and new wave band Metric have released nine studio albums, seven extended plays, 25 singles, two video albums, 29 music videos, and three soundtrack albums.

== Albums ==
=== Studio albums ===
List of studio albums, with selected chart positions and certifications
Title	Album details	Peak chart positions										Certifications
Title	Album details	CAN	AUS	BEL (FL)	BEL (WA)	FRA	GER	SCO	SWI	UK	US	Certifications
Old World Underground, Where Are You Now?	Released: September 2, 2003 (CAN); Label: Last Gang; Formats: CD, LP, digital download, streaming	—	—	—	—	188	—	—	—	—	—	MC: Gold
Live It Out	Released: September 27, 2005 (CAN); Label: Last Gang; Formats: CD, LP, digital download, streaming	—	—	—	—	—	—	—	—	—	— (Note: Live It Out did not enter the US Billboard 200, but peaked at number 37 on the US Heatseekers Albums Chart.)	MC: Platinum
Grow Up and Blow Away	Released: June 26, 2007 (CAN); Label: Last Gang; Formats: CD, LP, digital download, streaming	—	—	—	—	—	—	—	—	—	—	
Fantasies	Released: April 7, 2009 (CAN); Label: Metric Music International; Formats: CD, LP, digital download, streaming	6	48	—	—	110	—	—	—	164	76	MC: Platinum
Synthetica	Released: June 12, 2012 (CAN); Label: Metric Music International; Formats: CD, LP, digital download, streaming	2	21	132	113	91	78	53	59	51	12	MC: Platinum
Pagans in Vegas	Released: September 18, 2015; Label: Metric Music International; Formats: CD, LP, digital download, cassette, streaming	5	87	—	143	—	—	94	—	124	36	
Art of Doubt	Released: September 21, 2018; Label: Metric Music International; Formats: CD, LP, digital download, streaming	5	—	—	—	—	—	61	—	— (Note: Art of Doubt did not enter the UK Albums Chart, but peaked at number 68 on the UK Album Downloads chart.)	95	
Formentera	Released: July 8, 2022; Label: Metric Music International; Formats: CD, LP, digital download, streaming	38	—	—	—	—	—	61	—	—	—	
Formentera II	Released: October 13, 2023; Label: Metric Music International; Formats: CD, LP, digital download, streaming	82	—	—	—	—	—	—	—	—	—	
Romanticize the Dive	Released: April 24, 2026; Label: Metric Music International; Formats: CD, LP, digital download, streaming	—	—	—	—	—	—	—	—	15	—	

=== Soundtrack albums ===
List of soundtrack albums
Title	Album details
The Twilight Saga: Eclipse	Released: June 8, 2010 (US); Label: Chop Shop/Atlantic; Formats: CD, digital download
Scott Pilgrim vs. the World	Released: August 10, 2010 (US); Label: ABKCO Records; Formats: CD, digital download
Cosmopolis (with Howard Shore)	Released: May 15, 2012 (FRA); Label: Howe; Formats: CD, digital download

=== Video albums ===
List of video albums
Title	Album details
Live at Metropolis	Released: February 12, 2008 (CAN); Label: Last Gang; Format: DVD
Dreams So Real	Released: April 13, 2018 (CAN); Label: Media Goes Here; Format: DVD, Blu-ray, digital

== Extended plays ==
- Mainstream EP (1998)
- Static Anonymity (2001)
- Live at Metropolis (2007)
- Plug In, Plug Out (2009)
- Spotify Acoustic EP (2010)
- Spotify Covers EP (2010)
- iTunes Session EP (2011)
- The Shade EP [Cassette only] (2015)

== Singles ==
List of singles, with selected chart positions and certifications, showing year released and album name
Title	Year	Peak chart positions										Certifications	Album
Title	Year	CAN	CAN Rock	AUS Hit.	BEL (FL)	BEL (WA)	MEX	SCO	UK	US	US Rock	Certifications	Album
"Combat Baby"	2004	—	×	—	—	—	—	—	—	—	—		Old World Underground, Where Are You Now?
"Dead Disco"	2004	—	×	—	—	—	—	—	—	—	—		Old World Underground, Where Are You Now?
"Monster Hospital"	2006	—	×	—	—	—	—	43	55	—	—		Live It Out
"Poster of a Girl"	2006	—	×	—	—	—	—	—	—	—	—		Live It Out
"Empty"	2007	—	—	—	—	—	—	—	— (Note: "Empty" did not enter the UK Singles Chart, but peaked at number 68 on the UK Physical Singles Chart Top 100.)	—	—		Live It Out
"Help I'm Alive"	2008	21	15	9	63	—	—	—	160	— (Note: "Help I'm Alive" did not enter the Billboard Hot 100 chart, but peaked at number 34 on the Hot Singles Sales chart.)	30	MC: 2× Platinum	Fantasies
"Front Row"	2009	65	—	—	—	—	—	—	—	—	—		Fantasies
"Gimme Sympathy"	2009	52	16	—	—	—	17	—	—	—	—	MC: Platinum	Fantasies
"Sick Muse"	2009	— (Note: "Sick Muse" did not enter the Billboard Canadian Hot 100, but peaked at number 28 on the Canada Emerging Artists chart.)	26	—	—	—	18	—	—	—	—		Fantasies
"Gold Guns Girls"	2009	85	17	—	—	—	—	—	—	—	28	MC: Platinum	Fantasies
"Waves"	2009	—	—	—	—	—	—	—	—	—	—		Fantasies
"Stadium Love"	2010	— (Note: "Stadium Love" did not enter the Billboard Canadian Hot 100, but peaked at number 24 on the Canada Emerging Artists chart.)	22	—	—	—	50	—	—	—	—		Fantasies
"Eclipse (All Yours)"	2010	—	—	—	—	86	—	—	—	—	—		The Twilight Saga: Eclipse
"Black Sheep" (original or featuring Brie Larson)	2010	—	—	—	—	—	—	—	—	—	34	MC: 2× Platinum; RMNZ: Gold	Scott Pilgrim vs. the World
"Youth Without Youth"	2012	63	12	—	—	—	32	—	—	—	28	MC: Gold	Synthetica
"Speed the Collapse"	2012	—	—	—	—	—	—	—	—	— (Note: "Speed The Collapse" did not enter the Billboard Hot 100 chart, but peaked at number 22 on the Bubbling Under Hot 100 Singles chart.)	—		Synthetica
"Breathing Underwater"	2012	22	16	—	—	—	—	—	—	—	— (Note: "Breathing Underwater" did not enter the Rock Songs chart, but peaked at number 31 on the Rock Airplay chart.)	MC: Gold	Synthetica
"Synthetica"	2013	—	21	—	—	—	—	—	—	—	—		Synthetica
"The Shade"	2015	92	11	—	—	—	—	—	—	—	— (Note: "The Shade" did not enter the Hot Rock & Alternative Songs chart, but peaked at number 40 on the Alternative Airplay chart.)		Pagans in Vegas
"Lie, Lie, Lie"	2015	—	25	—	—	—	—	—	—	—	—		Pagans in Vegas
"The Governess"	2015	—	—	—	—	—	—	—	—	—	—		Pagans in Vegas
"Dark Saturday"	2018	—	5	—	—	—	—	—	—	—	—		Art of Doubt
"Dressed to Suppress"	2018	—	—	—	—	—	—	—	—	—	—		Art of Doubt
"Now or Never Now"	2018	—	11	—	— (Note: "Now or Never Now" did not enter the Flemish Ultratop Top 50, but spent 4 weeks as an extra tip on the Flemish Ultratop Bubbling Under chart.)	— (Note: "Now or Never Now" did not enter the Walloon Ultratop Top 50, but spent 4 weeks as an extra tip on the Walloon Ultratop Bubbling Under chart.)	—	—	—	—	—		Art of Doubt
"Risk"	2019	—	15	—	—	—	—	—	—	—	—		Art of Doubt
"Common Lives"	2019	—	—	—	—	—	—	—	—	—	—		Non-album singles
"Auld Anxi"	2020	—	—	—	—	—	—	—	—	—	—		Non-album singles
"All Comes Crashing"	2022	—	4	—	—	—	—	—	—	—	— (Note: "All Comes Crashing" did not enter the Hot Rock & Alternative Songs chart, but peaked at number 39 on the Alternative Airplay chart.)		Formentera
"Doomscroller"	2022	—	—	—	—	—	—	—	—	—	—		Formentera
"What Feels Like Eternity"	2022	—	—	—	—	—	—	—	—	—	—		Formentera
"False Dichotomy"	2022	—	11	—	—	—	—	—	—	—	—		Formentera
"Just the Once"	2023	—	10	—	—	—	—	—	—	—	— (Note: "Just the Once" did not enter the Hot Rock & Alternative Songs chart, but peaked at number 38 on the Adult Alternative Airplay chart.)		Formentera II
"Nothing Is Perfect"	2023	—	—	—	—	—	—	—	—	—	—		Formentera II
"Who Would You Be for Me"	2023	—	—	—	—	—	—	—	—	—	—		Formentera II
"Victim of Luck"	2026	—	2	—	—	—	—	—	—	—	— (Note: "Victim of Luck" did not enter the Hot Rock & Alternative Songs chart, but peaked at number 16 on the Adult Alternative Airplay chart and number 38 on the Alternative Songs chart.)		Romanticize the Dive
"Time Is a Bomb"	2026	—	—	—	—	—	—	—	—	—	—		Romanticize the Dive
"Crush Forever"	2026	—	—	—	—	—	—	—	—	—	—		Romanticize the Dive
"Tremolo"	2026	—	—	—	—	—	—	—	—	—	—		Romanticize the Dive
"—" denotes releases that did not chart. "×" denotes periods where charts did not exist or were not archived.

=== Promotional singles ===
List of promotional singles, showing year released and album name
Title	Year	Album
"Handshakes"	2006	Live It Out
"Hardwire"	2007	Grow Up and Blow Away
"Lost Kitten"	2013	Synthetica
"The Fatal Gift"	2014	Non-album single
"Cascades"	2015	Pagans in Vegas
"Too Bad, So Sad"	2015	Pagans in Vegas
"Fortunes"	2015	Pagans in Vegas
"Come on Angel"	2017	Non-album single
"Love You Back"	2019	Art of Doubt
"Dark Saturday (Dirt Road version)"	2019	Non-album singles
"Empty (Dirt Road version)"	2020	Non-album singles
"The Police and the Private (Dirt Road version)"	2020	Non-album singles
"Live It Out (Dirt Road version)"	2020	Non-album singles
"Cascades (Dirt Road version)"	2021	Non-album singles
"Now or Never Now (Dirt Road version)"	2021	Non-album singles

== Other charting songs ==
List of songs, with selected chart positions, showing year released and album name
Title	Year	Peak chart positions	Album
Title	Year	CAN Rock	Album
"Paper Walls" (with Rezz)	2021	37	Spiral

== Music videos ==
Year	Title	Director
2003	"Calculation Theme"	Ramon Bloomberg
2003	"IOU"	Michael Lustig, Steve Hanft
2003	"Combat Baby"	Michael Schiller
2003	"Succexy"	Ashley Cahill
2004	"The List"	Chris Grismer
2004	"Dead Disco"	Chris Grismer
2005	"Monster Hospital"	Micah Meisner
2006	"Poster of a Girl"	Micah Meisner
2007	"Empty"	Jaron Albertin
2009	"Help, I'm Alive"	Deco Dawson
2009	"Gimme Sympathy"	Frank Borin
2009	"Sick Muse"	Justin Broadbent
2010	"Gold Guns Girls"	Eady Bros., Metric
2010	"Stadium Love"	Deco Dawson, Robby Starbuck, Frank Borin
2010	"Eclipse (All Yours)"	Brantley Gutierrez
2010	"Black Sheep"	Michael Gochanour
2010	"Collect Call"	Christopher Mills
2011	"Expecting to Fly"	Christopher Mills
2012	"Youth Without Youth"	Justin Broadbent
2012	"Breathing Underwater"	Lauren Graham
2013	"Synthetica"	Justin Broadbent
2013	"Lost Kitten"	Sammy Rawal
2015	"The Shade"	Lauren Graham
2015	"The Governess"	Lauren Graham
2018	"Dark Saturday"	Justin Broadbent
2018	"Dressed to Suppress"	Justin Broadbent
2018	"Now or Never Now"	Lorraine Nicholson, Emily Haines
2019	"Love You Back"	Kristina Fleischer, Jonny Sanders
2019	"Risk"	Kristina Fleischer, Duane Fernandez
2022	"All Comes Crashing"	Justin Broadbent
2022	"Doomscroller"	Justin Broadbent
2022	"What Feels Like Eternity"	Justin Broadbent
2022	"False Dichotomy"	Justin Broadbent
2023	"Just the Once"	Justin Broadbent
2023	"Nothing Is Perfect"	Justin Broadbent
2023	"Who Would You Be for Me"	Justin Broadbent
2023	"Days of Oblivion"	Justin Broadbent
2026	"Victim of Luck"	Fezz & Chess
