= Romanticize the Dive =

Studio album by Metric
- Released: April 24, 2026
- Studio: Electric Lady Studios; Main Street Studios
- Genre: Indie rock
- Length: 43:16
- Label: Metric Music International; Thirty Tigers
- Producer: Gavin Brown; John O'Mahony; Liam O'Neil; James Shaw

Metric chronology
Formentera II (2023)	Romanticize the Dive (2026)

Singles from Romanticize the Dive
- 1. "Victim of Luck" Released: 3 February 2026; 2. "Time is a Bomb" Released: 5 March 2026; 3. "Crush Forever" Released: 1 April 2026

Romanticize the Dive is the tenth studio album by Canadian rock band Metric. It was released on April 24, 2026, through Metric Music International and Thirty Tigers, and received generally positive reviews.

== Background and composition ==
Thematically, Romanticize the Dive reflects on the early stages of Metric's career; it was produced by Gavin Brown, who previously worked on Fantasies and Synthetica. Frontwoman Emily Haines described it as the "essence" of the band, as opposed to the more "exploratory" nature of albums such as Formentera.

The album was recorded at Electric Lady Studios in New York and Main Street Studios in Toronto.

== Release ==
The album was announced on 3 February 2026, alongside the first single, "Victim Of Luck". The second and third singles, "Time is a Bomb", and "Crush Forever", were released on 5 March and 1 April respectively. The release of the album was celebrated with a roller disco party in Brooklyn, which was utilised for the music video of "Crush Forever".

== Reception ==
Professional ratings
Aggregate scores
Source	Rating
Metacritic	75/100
Review scores
Source	Rating
AllMusic	4/5 stars
DIY	4/5 stars
musicOMH	4/5 stars
Paste	B
Under the Radar	8/10 stars

On the review aggregator Metacritic, Romanticize the Dive received a score of 75 out of 100 based on seven critics' reviews, indicating "generally favorable" reception. Joe Goggins of DIY described it as sonically "leaning into the fundamentals", and Under the Radar writer Jimi Arundell called it a "reaffirmation" of the band's most popular work. Eric B. Danton of Paste said that despite its retrospective nature, it was not "merely a retread". AllMusic reviewer Tim Sendra praised Haines' "second-to-none vocals", stating that it is "hard to image why she isn't a cultural icon on par with Hayley Williams".

== Track listing ==
Romanticize the Dive track listing
No.	Title	Writer(s)	Length
1.	"Victim of Luck"	Emily Haines; James Shaw; Gavin Brown; Liam O'Neil	3:23
2.	"Wild Rut"	Haines; Shaw; Brown; O'Neil	3:11
3.	"Time Is a Bomb"	Haines; Shaw; Brown	4:25
4.	"Crush Forever"	Haines; Shaw; Brown; O'Neil	4:32
5.	"Tremolo"	Haines; Shaw; Brown	3:43
6.	"Moral Compass"	Haines; Shaw; Brown	4:28
7.	"As If You’re Here"	Haines; Shaw; O'Neil	3:36
8.	"Loyal"	Haines; Shaw; Brown	3:58
9.	"Antigravity"	Haines; Shaw; Brown	3:40
10.	"Clouds to Break"	Haines; Shaw; O'Neil	4:39
11.	"Leave You on a High"	Haines; Shaw; Brown	3:35
Total length:			43:16

== Personnel ==
Credits are adapted from the album's liner notes and Tidal.

=== Metric ===
- Emily Haines – lead vocals
- James Shaw – electric guitar, production
- Joules Scott-Key – drums
- Joshua Winstead – bass guitar

=== Additional contributors ===
- John O'Mahony – production, mixing
- Gavin Brown – production
- Liam O'Neil – production
- Shawn Dealey – engineering
- Lauren Marquez – engineering
- Greg Calbi – mastering
- Steve Fallone – mastering
- Justin Broadbent – artwork

== Charts ==
Chart performance for Romanticize the Dive
Chart (2026)	Peak position
Scottish Albums (OCC)	10
UK Albums Sales (OCC)	15
UK Independent Albums (OCC)	3
US Top Album Sales (Billboard)	30
