= Cut in Half and Also Double =

Studio album by Emily Haines
- Released: 1 January 1996
- Recorded: 1992–1996
- Genre: Indie rock
- Length: 29:58

Emily Haines chronology
Cut in Half and Also Double (1996)	Knives Don't Have Your Back (2006)

Cut in Half and Also Double is the debut album by Canadian artist Emily Haines that she self-released in about 2,000 copies in 1996 in Toronto. The song "Carpet" contains similar lyrics and vocal melodies to those in "Too Little Too Late," which she recorded a decade later with her band Metric. "Pink" finishes with a recording of a homeless woman rambling.

Copies of the album are extremely rare and often sell in excess of $100 online.

Though the musicians originally asked fans that had gained access to this album to avoid distributing copies via the internet, songs from this solo disc can be found online.

== Track listing ==
1. "Dog" – 2:26
2. "Bore" – 2:29
3. "Eden" – 3:32
4. "Pretty Head" – 2:52
5. "Freak" – 4:44
6. "The View" – 2:48
7. "Eau de Toilette" – 3:19
8. "Carpet" – 2:48
9. "Pink" – 5:00
- Recording dates and locations for songs:
1. Dog – Montreal, 1996
2. Bore – Montreal, 1995
3. Eden – Vancouver, 1992
4. Pretty Head – Toronto, 1995
5. Freak – Toronto, 1996
6. The View – Vancouver, 1992
7. Eau de Toilette – Vancouver, 1993
8. Carpet – Toronto, 1995
9. Pink – Toronto, 1995
