= Grow Up and Blow Away =

Studio album by Metric
- Released: June 26, 2007
- Recorded: 2000 – April 2001
- Genre: Indie rock, post-punk revival
- Length: 39:10
- Label: Last Gang
- Producer: James Shaw

Metric chronology
Live It Out (2005)	Grow Up and Blow Away (2007)	Fantasies (2009)

Singles from Grow Up and Blow Away
- 1. "Grow Up and Blow Away" Released: 2002

Professional ratings
Review scores
Source	Rating
AllMusic	3.5/5 stars
The A.V. Club	B+
musicOMH	3.5/5 stars
Pitchfork	7.6/10
PopMatters	7/10

Grow Up and Blow Away is the third studio album by the Canadian indie rock band Metric. The album was recorded in 2001, but its release was delayed for years; this was due to their record label, Restless Records, being purchased by Rykodisc.

As the years passed, the band's sound changed to the point where they no longer felt the album would be what the fans expected to hear. As such, Metric recorded a completely new album, Old World Underground, Where Are You Now?, and released that instead. Last Gang Records later purchased the rights to the album and released it on June 26, 2007.

Compared with the 2001 version, the songs "London Halflife" and "Soft Rock Star" (Jimmy vs. Joe mix) from the 2001 EP Static Anonymity were added. "Torture Me", "Fanfare", and "Parkdale" were removed. Also, the order of some songs was changed and other songs (like the title track and "Rock Me Now") were slightly re-worked.

The album's title song (with the lyrics "die today" changed to "fly today") was used in a television commercial in North America for Polaroid Corporation's I-Zone Sticky Film in 2000–2001.

== Track listing ==
=== 2007 version ===
All songs written, performed and recorded by Emily Haines and James Shaw.

No.	Title	Length
1.	"Grow Up and Blow Away"	4:13
2.	"Hardwire"	4:41
3.	"Rock Me Now"	3:51
4.	"The Twist"	3:36
5.	"On the Sly"	3:58
6.	"Soft Rock Star"	4:00
7.	"Raw Sugar"	3:38
8.	"White Gold"	4:09
9.	"London Halflife" (originally from the Static Anonymity EP)	2:14
10.	"Soft Rock Star (Jimmy vs. Joe mix)" (originally from the Static Anonymity EP)	4:23

"Torture Me", "Parkdale", and "Fanfare" were never re-released.

=== 2001 version (never officially released) ===
All songs written, performed and recorded by Emily Haines and James Shaw.

No.	Title	Length
1.	"Grow Up and Blow Away"	4:25
2.	"On the Sly"	4:01
3.	"Torture Me"	3:51
4.	"Fanfare"	0:24
5.	"Parkdale"	4:53
6.	"Raw Sugar"	3:47
7.	"The Twist"	3:38
8.	"Rock Me Now"	4:14
9.	"Soft Rock Star"	4:00
10.	"White Gold"	4:09
11.	"Hardwire"	4:42

== See also ==
- Ornament & Crime (2017), an album by Self which suffered a similar fate as Grow Up and Blow Away, and has been compared to Metric by critics.
