= Formentera (disambiguation) =

Formentera is an island in the Balearic Islands, Spain.

Formentera may also refer to:

- Formentera (album), a 2022 studio album by Metric
- Formentera (song), a 2021 song by Aitana and Nicki Nicole
- Formentera (Parliament of the Balearic Islands constituency), an electoral constituency
