= Cosmopolis (soundtrack) =

Cosmopolis: Original Motion Picture Soundtrack

Soundtrack album by Howard Shore, Metric and various artists
- Released: 4 June 2012
- Recorded: Various times
- Genres: Pop rock; alternative rock
- Length: 40:22
- Label: Howe Records
- Producers: Howard Shore; Metric

Howard Shore chronology
Hugo (2013)	Cosmopolis (2014)	Jimmy P: Psychotherapy of a Plains Indian (2014)

Cosmopolis: Original Motion Picture Soundtrack is the soundtrack to the 2012 film Cosmopolis directed by David Cronenberg starring Robert Pattinson. It featured musical score composed by Cronenberg's regular collaborator Howard Shore and the Canadian indie rock band Metric, who jointly composed and produced the album. The album was released through Shore's Howe Records label on 4 June 2012.

== Background ==
The soundtrack reunited Shore and Metric who had previously collaborated on a song for Twilight Saga: Eclipse soundtrack (which had also starred Robert Pattinson). While writing the score for Cosmopolis, Shore desired a particular live sound and invited Metric to perform the score and co-write three songs. The music was recorded in November 2011 at the band's own Giant Studios in Toronto, produced by Shore and the band guitarist Jimmy Shaw and mixed by John O'Mahony at Liberty Studios in Toronto and Electric Lady Studios in New York City. Besides Metric's contribution, the soundtrack also features "Mecca" by Somali-Canadian singer/rapper K'naan with lyrics by K'naan and Don DeLillo.

== Release ==
Shore's Howe Records label distributed the soundtrack. The album released first on 15 May 2012 in France, Italy, Luxemburg, Switzerland, Hungary, 4, 5 and 7 June in United Kingdom, Canada and Netherlands, 6 July in Germany and 10 July in United States and internationally.

== Reception ==
Film Music Magazine's Daniel Schweiger praised the soundtrack as "an environment of hallucinatory beauty. There's a real intelligence to the rock-alt. material here that goes beyond many indie star-composer collaborations." James Christopher Monger of AllMusic rated the album four out of five, and described it as "one of the most engaging soundtracks of the year." Brice Ezell of PopMatters assigned 5 (out of 10) and wrote "the results of Cosmopolis show is that this innovation is likely to have plenty of growing pains along the way". Annie Zaleski of Alternative Press wrote "Alluring and apprehensive, Cosmopolis is an engaging listen." Lee Marshall of Screen International wrote "Howard Shore's Moby-like soundtrack is good at mood building." Raffi Asdourian of HuffPost wrote Shore's "ominous music creates an unsettling mood". Justin Chang of Variety wrote "Howard Shore supplies one of his subtler scores, at times registering as little more than an ominous background rumble."

== Track listing ==
All tracks are written by Howard Shore, except where indicated; all music composed and produced by Shore and Metric.

No.	Title	Writer(s)	Artist(s)	Length
1.	"White Limos"			1:59
2.	"Long to Live"	Emily Haines; James Shaw	Metric	4:26
3.	"Rat Men"			4:44
4.	"Asymmetrical"			4:11
5.	"I Don't Want to Wake Up"	Haines; Shaw	Metric	4:14
6.	"A Credible Threat"			1:53
7.	"Call Me Home"	Haines; Shaw	Metric	2:36
8.	"Haircut"			3:58
9.	"Mecca (with K'naan)"	Don DeLillo; K'naan	K'naan	2:55
10.	"The Gun"			2:34
11.	"Benno"			6:52
Total length:				40:22

== Awards and nominations ==
Year	Award	Category	Recipient	Result	Ref.
2012	World Soundtrack Academy	Soundtrack Composer of the Year	Howard Shore	Nominated	
2013	Canadian Screen Awards	Achievement in Music: Original Score	Howard Shore	Won	
2013	Canadian Screen Awards	Achievement in Music: Original Song	Emily Haines, James Shaw and Howard Shore, "Long to Live"	Won	
