= Gold Guns Girls =

Single by Metric

from the album Fantasies
- Released: 2009
- Genre: Indie rock, new wave
- Length: 4:08 (album version)
- Label: Last Gang
- Songwriters: Emily Haines, James Shaw
- Producers: Gavin Brown, James Shaw, John O'Mahony

Metric singles chronology
"Sick Muse" (2009)	"Gold Guns Girls" (2009)	"Stadium Love" (2010)

Music video
- "Gold Guns Girls" on YouTube

"Gold Guns Girls" is the fourth single from the Canadian rock group Metric's fourth album Fantasies. The lyrics were inspired by the 1983 movie, Scarface. The song was released in the UK and US for radio airplay in December 2009 and as a download single in the UK on April 25, 2010. Metric also released an acoustic version of the song on their EP Plug In Plug Out.

== Background ==
Singer Emily Haines said, "When Jimmy sent me this song as a rough sketch I listened to it over and over while watching Scarface, dreaming up ideas. The lyrics I wrote look at greed in all its forms, and the fact that we seem programmed to be insatiable. If we could do a million dollar video for this song it would be a remake of that montage scene from Scarface – including the tiger!"

== Reception ==
The single was met with positive reviews. David Renshaw of Drowned in Sound said the song "is a ferocious battle anthem which sees rapid fire vocals interspersed with a machine gun like guitar which strikes through the song like a knife through butter". Tim Sendra of AllMusic called the song "laser beam-tight" and said it "should be blasting out of car radios on summer streets".

== Promotion and release ==
The song was the opening and ending theme for the 2009 animated feature film Totally Spies! The Movie, the 2009 live-action film Zombieland and the 2023 animated feature film Nimona. It was also featured in the football video game by EA Sports, FIFA 10 and Test Drive Unlimited 2.

A remix by Mike Shinoda of Linkin Park appears on the Download to Donate for Haiti album, and was included in the expanded edition of Fantasies.

A single was released in the UK with the B-side listed as "Sick Muse" (Adam Freeland remix), however, the song presented was "Gimme Sympathy".

A live version was recorded at KCRW radio station in 2009 featuring a guitar solo by guitarist James Shaw. Preferred by fans, this is the rendition most commonly performed live in concert.

== Music video ==
The music video for "Gold Guns Girls" was shot by Eady Bros and Metric. It is presented in black-and-white film, and features the band racing around snowy New York City streets. Every so often, a band member will stop at an instrument on the sidewalk and play it (Haines would stop at a mic and sing).

== Charts ==
=== Weekly charts ===
Chart (2009)	Peak position
Canadian Hot 100 (Billboard)	85
US Rock Songs (Billboard)	28
US Alternative Songs (Billboard)	16

=== Year-end charts ===
Chart (2010)	Position
US Alternative Songs (Billboard)	43

== Certifications ==
Certifications for "Gold Guns Girls"
Region	Certification	Certified units/sales
Canada (Music Canada)	Platinum	80,000^{‡}
^{‡} Sales+streaming figures based on certification alone.
