= Choir of the Mind =

Studio album by Emily Haines & The Soft Skeleton
- Released: September 5, 2017
- Recorded: September–October 2016
- Studio: Giant Studios
- Genre: Pop
- Length: 59:10
- Label: Last Gang
- Producer: Emily Haines; Jimmy Shaw

Emily Haines & The Soft Skeleton chronology
What Is Free to a Good Home? (2007)	Choir of the Mind (2017)

Choir of the Mind is the second studio album by Canadian singer/songwriter Emily Haines & the Soft Skeleton. Coming 11 years after her first album, it was released on September 5, 2017 by Last Gang Records and elicited favorable reviews from critics. The album peaked in the top 20 of the American Heatseekers Albums chart, and also debuted in the top 50 on the Canadian Albums Chart and the American Independent Albums chart.

== Composition ==
Many of the lyrics on the album center on feminism. In an interview with Billboard, Haines responded to journalists' claims that the album is about "a woman's place in the world" by stating that: "I’m going to resist the word 'about' because its not like a record about women’s place in the world at all [...] I’m really interested in the idea of femininity as a free-standing life force, and not always constructed in relation to what it isn’t, or in opposition to masculinity, or some sort of implied animosity between the sexes or something."

== Release ==
The album was released on September 5, 2017 by Last Gang Records. It was her first solo album in 11 years; however, in that time she had released three albums as part of the indie rock group Metric, in addition to contributing to two Broken Social Scene records.

== Critical reception ==
Professional ratings
Aggregate scores
Source	Rating
Metacritic	75/100
Review scores
Source	Rating
Allmusic	4/5 stars
Alternative Press	4/5 stars
DIY	3/5 stars
Exclaim!	8/10
musicOMH	3.5/5 stars
Now	4/5
PopMatters	5/10 stars
Record Collector	3/5 stars

Upon its release, the album was met with generally favorable reviews from music critics. It holds a score of 75/100 on review aggregate site Metacritic, indicating "generally favorable reviews," based on 11 reviews. Tim Sendra, writing for AllMusic, awarded the album 4 stars out of 5, praising her vocals as possessing an "understated power and graceful beauty," singling out the album's ballads as highlights and deemed the album "richly melodic, subtly dynamic, and emotionally powerful." Exclaim! awarded the album a score of 8/10 and praised "Legend of the Wild Horse" as "a quietly powerful rock ballad," concluding that the album was worth the 11-year wait.

== Track listing ==
Adapted from AllMusic.

All tracks are written by Emily Haines.

No.	Title	Length
1.	"Planets"	3:08
2.	"Fatal Gift"	6:05
3.	"Strangle All Romance"	2:36
4.	"Wounded"	3:51
5.	"Legend of the Wild Horse"	4:49
6.	"Nihilist Abyss"	4:22
7.	"Minefield of Memory"	6:07
8.	"Perfect on the Surface"	4:02
9.	"Choir of the Mind"	6:51
10.	"Statuette"	5:40
11.	"Siren"	4:40
12.	"Irish Exit"	2:23
13.	"RIP"	4:36
Total length:		59:10

== Credits ==
Adapted from AllMusic.

- Justin Broadbent — artwork and photography
- Phil Demetro — mastering
- Emily Haines — vocals, production
- Kenny Luono — engineering
- Jimmy Shaw — mixing, production

== Charts ==
Chart (2017)	Peak position
US Heatseekers Albums (Billboard)	16
US Independent Albums (Billboard)	44
Canadian Albums Chart (Billboard)	42
