= Fantasies (album) =

Studio album by Metric
- Released: April 7, 2009
- Studios: Electric Lady, New York City; Metalworks Studios, Mississauga, Ontario
- Genres: Indie rock, new wave
- Length: 42:30
- Labels: Metric Music International, Last Gang, Mom + Pop
- Producer: Gavin Brown

Metric chronology
Grow Up and Blow Away (2007)	Fantasies (2009)	Synthetica (2012)

Singles from Fantasies
- 1. "Help I'm Alive" Released: December 23, 2008; 2. "Gimme Sympathy" Released: March 12, 2009; 3. "Sick Muse" Released: June 1, 2009; 4. "Gold Guns Girls" Released: April 25, 2010

Fantasies is the fourth studio album by Canadian indie rock band Metric. It was released on April 7, 2009. In the United States, it debuted at No. 1 on Billboard's Top Heatseekers, and peaked at No. 76 on the Billboard 200. As of October 2009, it had sold 76,000 copies in the United States according to Nielsen SoundScan. In Canada, it debuted at No. 13 on the Canadian Albums Chart and peaked at No. 6. In Australia, the album debuted at No. 48.

== Background ==
The first single release from the album, "Help I'm Alive", was added to the iTunes Store on December 23, 2008, in Canada. The single is also available on 7" vinyl from their website, and was available on their "Jingle Bell Rock" tour in December 2008. On February 13, 2009, the album cover's image was added to the song "Help, I'm Alive" on their MySpace playlist. On February 28, 2009, the band added the song "Gimme Sympathy" to their MySpace playlist.

The album was available through their website, in vinyl, deluxe hardcover, digital, or deluxe bundle packages. There was a Limited Edition Package available at first that was limited to 500 copies, which has now sold out.

Metric opted to self-release the album. The subsequent mainstream success of the album led The New York Times to use Metric as the central band in an article regarding the shrinking role of major labels in the music industry.

Frontwoman Emily Haines told Drowned in Sound that "Front Row" was inspired by the novel Great Jones Street by Don DeLillo.

The album was leaked, causing Metric to push the release date of the album forward one week to April 7.

The album was released on iTunes on March 31, 2009.

The song "Black Sheep" was recorded for the album; the track was ultimately left off because Metric felt that it 'too obviously reflected the band's sound'. It has since been released on the soundtrack for Scott Pilgrim vs. the World.

== Singles ==
- "Help, I'm Alive" (December 23, 2008) (No. 21 CAN)
- "Front Row" (March 12, 2009) (No. 65 CAN)
- "Gimme Sympathy" (Radio promo only) (No. 52 CAN)
- "Sick Muse" (June 1, 2009)
- "Gold Guns Girls" (Radio promo only) (December 2009) (No. 88 CAN)
- "Stadium Love" (video released May 28, 2010)

== Reception ==
Professional ratings
Aggregate scores
Source	Rating
AnyDecentMusic?	7.1/10
Metacritic	77/100
Review scores
Source	Rating
AllMusic	4/5 stars
The A.V. Club	B
Blender	3.5/5 stars
Entertainment Weekly	B+
The Guardian	4/5 stars
Los Angeles Times	3.5/4 stars
NME	8/10
Pitchfork	6.4/10
Rolling Stone	3.5/5 stars
Spin	7/10

Reception to the album has been highly positive. It currently holds a 77 rating on Metacritic, from 29 reviews. Amazon.com listed Fantasies at eleventh in its "Best Albums of 2009" list. The single "Gimme Sympathy" has been popular among alternative rock radio stations.

The album was a shortlisted nominee for the 2009 Polaris Music Prize. It also won two Casby Awards on October 22, 2009, the NXNE favourite new indie release award and favourite new album award. Fantasies ranked at number 26 on Stereogum's Best Album 2009.

The album also reached platinum status in Canada, where it sold over 80,000 copies. On April 18, 2010, the album won the Juno Award for Alternative Album of the Year at the 2010 Awards, as well as the band winning Group of the Year. As of 2012, it has sold 500,000 copies.

The album's song "Stadium Love" was named the official song of the Toronto Blue Jays for 2013. As of the 2014-15 NHL season, it was also the goal song for the Edmonton Oilers.

== Track listing ==
All tracks are written by Metric.

No.	Title	Length
1.	"Help I'm Alive"	4:45
2.	"Sick Muse"	4:17
3.	"Satellite Mind"	3:42
4.	"Twilight Galaxy"	4:53
5.	"Gold Guns Girls"	4:05
6.	"Gimme Sympathy"	3:54
7.	"Collect Call"	4:46
8.	"Front Row"	3:34
9.	"Blindness"	4:26
10.	"Stadium Love"	4:13

Pre-order bonus tracks
No.	Title	Length
11.	"Help I'm Alive" (acoustic version)	4:49
12.	"Waves" (limited edition bonus track)	3:06
13.	"Gimme Sympathy" (acoustic version)	3:27
14.	"Nobody Home" (Pink Floyd cover)	3:14

UK hidden tracks
No.	Title	Length
11.	"The Gates"	3:09
12.	"Gimme Sympathy" (acoustic version)	3:28
13.	"Waves"	3:05
14.	"Nobody Home" (Pink Floyd cover)	3:13

UK deluxe edition
No.	Title	Length
11.	"Waves" (exclusive B-Side)	3:07
12.	"The Gates" (exclusive B-Side)	3:10
13.	"Help I'm Alive" (acoustic)	4:52
14.	"Gimme Sympathy" (acoustic)	3:29
15.	"Sick Muse" (acoustic)	4:48
16.	"Sick Muse" (Adam Freeland Remix)	6:05
17.	"Gimme Sympathy" (Adam Freeland Remix)	5:52
18.	"Help I'm Alive" (Twelves Remix)	4:25
19.	"Nobody Home" (Pink Floyd cover)	3:15
20.	"Sugar Mountain" (Neil Young cover)	5:31

Expanded edition – Disc two (MET80019X)
No.	Title	Length
1.	"Black Sheep"
2.	"Sick Muse" (Adam Freeland Remix)
3.	"Gimme Sympathy" (Adam Freeland Remix)
4.	"Gold Guns Girls" (Mike Shinoda Remix)
5.	"Help I'm Alive" (Twelves Remix)
6.	"Waves"
7.	"The Gates"
8.	"Eclipse (All Yours)" (acoustic)
9.	"Sugar Mountain" (Neil Young cover)
10.	"Help I'm Alive" (acoustic)

Spotify covers EP
No.	Title	Length
1.	"Nobody Home" (Pink Floyd cover)
2.	"Paranoid Eyes" (Pink Floyd cover)
3.	"Sugar Mountain" (Neil Young cover)
4.	"It's a Sin" (Pet Shop Boys cover)
5.	"Black History Month" (Death from Above 1979 cover)
6.	"Perfect Day" (Lou Reed cover)

Spotify acoustic EP
No.	Title	Length
1.	"Help I'm Alive"
2.	"Gold Guns Girls"
3.	"Gimme Sympathy"
4.	"Satellite Mind"
5.	"Twilight Galaxy"
6.	"Front Row"
7.	"Sick Muse"

== Personnel ==
- Emily Haines – synthesizers, vocals
- James Shaw – guitar, vocals
- Joshua Winstead – bass guitar
- Joules Scott-Key – drums

The album was produced by Gavin Brown and mixed by John O'Mahony.

== Charts ==
=== Weekly charts ===
Chart (2009)	Peak position
Australian Albums (ARIA)	48
Canadian Albums (Billboard)	6
French Albums (SNEP)	110
US Billboard 200	76
US Independent Albums (Billboard)	6
US Top Rock Albums (Billboard)	22

=== Year-end charts ===
Chart (2009)	Position
Canadian Albums (Billboard)	43

== Certifications ==
Region	Certification	Certified units/sales
Canada (Music Canada)	Platinum	80,000^{^}
^{^} Shipments figures based on certification alone.
