= Knives Don't Have Your Back =

Studio album by Emily Haines & The Soft Skeleton
- Released: September 19, 2006
- Recorded: 2005
- Genre: Indie pop
- Length: 43:04
- Label: Last Gang
- Producer: Emily Haines

Emily Haines & The Soft Skeleton chronology
Cut in Half and Also Double (1996)	Knives Don't Have Your Back (2006)	What Is Free to a Good Home? (2007)

Professional ratings
Aggregate scores
Source	Rating
Metacritic	73/100
Review scores
Source	Rating
AllMusic	4/5 stars
Pitchfork	7.3/10
Rockfeedback	4/5 stars
Stylus Magazine	B+
This Is Fake DIY	4/5 stars
Uncut Magazine	4/5 stars
URB	8/10

Knives Don't Have Your Back is the debut studio album by Canadian singer-songwriter Emily Haines and the Soft Skeleton. It is not her own debut album, as she released under her own name in limited number of copies an earlier work in 1996, the Cut in Half and Also Double album, which was self-released. The album was released on September 19, 2006, by Last Gang Records. It debuted at 28 in Canada and has sold 20,000 copies there. She has stated that Metric is still her first priority.

The album is a collection of piano-driven songs backed with soft strings and horns and is said to feature guest spots by Sparklehorse's Scott Minor, members of Stars, Broken Social Scene and Metric.

She is quoted as saying the following: "When I was a little kid…I would creep downstairs to the piano and write rudimentary songs about imaginary places. I'm told the first song I ever wrote was a love song to a cranberry tree. I always used the mute pedal. I hated the idea of anybody hearing me. Everywhere I've lived while working with Metric, I've written songs on the piano and played them for no one. On the advice of a friend, I decided I'd better start recording them before they were forgotten. Four meandering years later I ended up with this collection of songs featuring a few of my favorite people, a group I call The Soft Skeleton."

The album's art is based on that of Escalator over the Hill, Haines' late father Paul Haines' album with Carla Bley.

The album was "critically lauded", and was considered one of the best albums of 2006. At Metacritic, which assigns a normalized rating out of 100 to reviews from mainstream publications, it received an average score of 73 based on 18 reviews.

The song "Doctor Blind" was rated #457 on Pitchfork Media's Top 500 Tracks of the 2000s.

The original UK and Ireland CD release featured 3 bonus tracks: "The Bank", "Bottom of the World" and "Sprig". The Japanese release, meanwhile, featured 2 bonus tracks: "Sprig" and "Rowboat."

All of the bonus tracks later appeared on 2007's What Is Free to a Good Home? EP.

== Track listing ==
No.	Title	Length
1.	"Our Hell"	4:09
2.	"Doctor Blind"	3:57
3.	"Crowd Surf Off a Cliff"	5:56
4.	"Detective Daughter"	5:10
5.	"The Lottery"	3:45
6.	"The Maid Needs a Maid"	3:21
7.	"Mostly Waving"	3:12
8.	"Reading in Bed"	2:49
9.	"Nothing & Nowhere"	3:24
10.	"The Last Page"	4:49
11.	"Winning"	5:08

=== UK bonus tracks ===
No.	Title	Length
12.	"The Bank"	3:02
13.	"Bottom of the World"	2:44
14.	"Sprig"	3:56

=== Japan bonus tracks ===
No.	Title	Length
12.	"Sprig"	3:56
13.	"Rowboat"	3:08
