= Old World Underground, Where Are You Now? =

Studio album by Metric
- Released: September 2, 2003
- Recorded: Elgonix Labs, Los Angeles
- Genre: New wave, indie rock, post-punk revival
- Length: 37:14
- Label: Last Gang, Everloving
- Producer: Michael Andrews

Metric chronology
Static Anonymity EP (2001)	Old World Underground, Where Are You Now? (2003)	Live It Out (2005)

Singles from Old World Underground, Where Are You Now?
- 1. "Combat Baby" Released: December 6, 2004; 2. "Dead Disco" Released: 2004

Professional ratings
Review scores
Source	Rating
AllMusic	3.5/5 stars
Drowned in Sound	7/10
Pitchfork	7.3/10
Sputnikmusic	4/5 stars
Ultimate Guitar	9.5/10

Old World Underground, Where Are You Now? is the debut album by the Canadian indie rock band Metric, released on September 2, 2003, through Enjoy Records and Last Gang Records in Canada; it went Gold in Canada. It was produced by Michael Andrews, recorded at Elgonix Labs, Los Angeles, and mixed at Sonora Recordings.

Old World Underground, Where Are You Now? was met with generally positive reception.

== Track listing ==
All tracks are written by Metric

No.	Title	Length
1.	"IOU"	4:22
2.	"Hustle Rose"	5:33
3.	"Succexy"	3:05
4.	"Combat Baby"	3:29
5.	"Calculation Theme"	3:31
6.	"Wet Blanket"	4:07
7.	"On a Slow Night"	4:36
8.	"The List"	2:52
9.	"Dead Disco"	3:25
10.	"Love Is a Place"	2:09

== Personnel ==
=== Metric ===
- Emily Haines – vocals, synthesizers
- James Shaw – guitar, vocals
- Joshua Winstead – bass guitar
- Joules Scott-Key – drums

=== Production ===
- Michael Andrews – producer
- Edson Miller – engineer, mixing
- Joe Gastwirt – mastering
- Josh Hassin – album cover design
