= What Is Free to a Good Home? =

What is Free to a Good Home?

EP by Emily Haines & The Soft Skeleton
- Released: July 24, 2007
- Recorded: 2006 at the Studio Plateau in Montreal, Phase One & International Chemical Workers Union in Toronto
- Genre: Indie pop
- Length: 17:54
- Label: Last Gang Records
- Producer: Jimmy Shaw & Dave Newfeld for ("Sprig")

Emily Haines & The Soft Skeleton chronology
Knives Don't Have Your Back (2006)	What is Free to a Good Home? (2007)	Choir of the Mind (2017)

Professional ratings
Review scores
Source	Rating
Allmusic	link
The A.V. Club	C+ link
Music-Critic.ca	3.5/5 link
Pitchfork Media	7.5/10 link

What is Free to a Good Home? is the first extended play (EP) by Emily Haines & The Soft Skeleton. The EP consists of five new songs and a remix, including previously unreleased tracks from the sessions of Knives Don't Have Your Back. It was released July 24, 2007 in Canada and the United States on Last Gang Records. The title of the EP comes from a poem by Emily Haines' father, Paul Haines.

== Track listing ==
1. "Rowboat"
2. "The Bank"
3. "Telethon"
4. "Bottom of the World"
5. "Sprig"
6. "Mostly Waving" (todorK remix)

*All tracks written by Emily Haines except "Sprig" which is a poem by Paul Haines set to music with altered wording.

== Personnel ==
- Emily Haines — vocals, piano
- Justin Peroff — drums on "The Bank"
- Jimmy Shaw — trumpet on "Rowboat", "Telethon", "The Bank" and "Mostly Waving"; harmonium on The "Bank"
- Evan Cranley — trombone on "Rowboat", "Telethon", "The Bank" and "Mostly Waving"
- Chris Seligman — French horn on "Rowboat", "Telethon", "The Bank" and "Mostly Waving"
- Lance Barrington — guest vocals on "Mostly Waving"
- David Newfeld — strings, guitar, synth and bass on "Sprig"
