= Live It Out =

Studio album by Metric
- Released: September 27, 2005
- Recorded: Metalworks Studios, Mississauga, Ontario
- Genre: Indie rock, new wave, post-punk revival
- Length: 40:54
- Label: Last Gang
- Producer: James Shaw

Metric chronology
Old World Underground, Where Are You Now? (2003)	Live It Out (2005)	Grow Up and Blow Away (2007)

Singles from Live It Out
- 1. "Monster Hospital" Released: 2006; 2. "Poster of a Girl" Released: 2006; 3. "Handshakes" Released: 2006 (promo only); 4. "Empty" Released: 2007

Professional ratings
Review scores
Source	Rating
AllMusic	3.5/5 stars
musicOMH	5/5 stars
NME	8/10
No Ripcord	8/10
Pitchfork	4.2/10
Uncut	4/5 stars

Live It Out is the second album released by the Canadian indie rock band Metric. It was released on September 27, 2005, on Last Gang Records. The album sold 45,000 copies in the US, and it went Platinum in Canada, where it sold 100,000.

Live It Out was shortlisted for the 2006 Polaris Music Prize and nominated for "Alternative Album of the Year" at Juno Awards 2006. The album was also chosen as one of Amazon.com's Top 100 Editor's Picks of 2005 and the 38th best album of 2006 by NME.

There were three singles (and videos) released from the album: "Monster Hospital", "Poster of a Girl" and "Empty". "Handshakes" was a radio promo that was released only in Canada.

== Track listing ==
All tracks are written by Metric

No.	Title	Length
1.	"Empty"	5:55
2.	"Glass Ceiling"	3:55
3.	"Handshakes"	3:06
4.	"Too Little Too Late"	4:22
5.	"Poster of a Girl"	4:44
6.	"Monster Hospital"	3:30
7.	"Patriarch on a Vespa"	4:32
8.	"The Police and the Private"	3:43
9.	"Ending Start"	3:20
10.	"Live It Out"	3:43

Japanese edition bonus tracks
No.	Title	Length
11.	"Poster of a Girl" (Girl On Girl Revision)	3:31
12.	"Poster of a Girl" (radio edit)	3:24

German enhanced edition bonus track
No.	Title	Length
11.	"Monster Hospital" (MSTRKRFT Remix)	5:14

French digipack edition bonus track
No.	Title	Length
11.	"Dead Rock & Roll" (Dead Disco Remix)	4:00

== Personnel ==
- Emily Haines – vocals, synthesizers
- James Shaw – guitar, producer
- Joshua Winstead – bass guitar
- Joules Scott-Key – drums

== Charts ==
Chart (2005)	Peak position
Canada (Nielsen SoundScan)	14
US Billboard Top Heatseekers	37
US Billboard Independent Albums	44
