= Youth Without Youth (song) =

Single by Metric

from the album Synthetica
- Released: May 1, 2012
- Recorded: 2012
- Genre: Indie rock, electronic rock
- Length: 4:17
- Label: Mom + Pop
- Songwriters: James Shaw, Emily Haines
- Producer: Gavin Brown

Metric singles chronology
"Stadium Love" (2010)	"Youth Without Youth" (2012)	"Breathing Underwater" (2012)

Music video
- "Youth Without Youth" on YouTube

"Youth Without Youth" is a song by Canadian indie rock band Metric. It was released as the lead single from their 2012 album, Synthetica. The song debuted at number one on the Canadian alternative rock chart and stayed at that spot for a record 16 consecutive weeks. The song tackles the subject of a fraying social state through the eyes of a deprived youth.

== Reception ==
The song has received mixed to favorable reviews from critics. Jon Dolan of Rolling Stone gave the song a mixed review, giving it a rating of 3 out of 5 stars and describing the song as "Glam sugar with a bitter core". Dolan further stated that "Perennial indie crush Emily Haines drops a wasted-youth anthem with scarred poetry like "We played blindman's bluff till they stopped the game", over a bleak- bubblegum stomp".

Jillian Mapes of Billboard praised Haines' songwriting, stating "Lyrically, frontwoman Emily Haines toys with powerful imagery, using phrases like "double dutch with a hand grenade" and "rubber soul with a razor blade" to describe a young life full of malaise and even criminality".

== Charts ==
=== Weekly charts ===
Chart (2012)	Peak position
Canadian Hot 100	63
Canadian Alternative Rock Chart	1
Canada Rock Chart	12
US Rock Songs (Billboard)	28
US Alternative Songs (Billboard)	15

=== Year-end charts ===
Chart (2012)	Position
US Alternative Songs (Billboard)	44

== Certifications ==
Region	Certification	Certified units/sales
Canada (Music Canada)	Gold	40,000^{‡}
^{‡} Sales+streaming figures based on certification alone.
