= Static Anonymity =

Static Anonymity EP

EP by Metric
- Released: 2001
- Recorded: Unknown
- Genre: Indie rock
- Length: 17:44
- Label: Restless
- Producer: Jimmy Shaw

Metric chronology
Mainstream EP (1998)	Static Anonymity EP (2001)	Old World Underground, Where Are You Now? (2003)

Static Anonymity is an EP released by the Canadian band Metric in 2001. The back cover of the album states that "This handmade collection of rare songs is only available at Metric performances or at www.ilovemetric.com and is not intended for retail sale". Though it states that one can buy the album via the band's official website, this is no longer true. However, the songs "Grow Up and Blow Away", "Soft Rock Star", and "London Halflife" were included on the 2007 release of their third album Grow Up and Blow Away.

The EP was released as a way for the band to get their music out to fans while their then upcoming album Grow Up and Blow Away was delayed due to the sale of their record label to Rykodisc.

== Track listing ==
No.	Title	Length
1.	"Grow Up and Blow Away"	4:24
2.	"Siamese Cities"	3:50
3.	"Down"	3:21
4.	"Soft Rock Star (Jimmy vs. Joe Mix)"	3:59
5.	"London Halflife"	2:10
