= Monster Hospital =

Single by Metric

from the album Live It Out
- Released: August 7, 2006
- Genre: Indie rock; new wave
- Length: 3:34
- Label: Drowned in Sound
- Songwriter: Metric

Metric singles chronology
| "Combat Baby" (2004) | "Monster Hospital" (2006) | "Poster of a Girl" (2006) |

"Monster Hospital" is a song by Canadian rock band Metric from their second album, Live It Out. It is the album's first single, followed by "Poster of a Girl".

The song makes reference to Bobby Fuller and the chorus tributes his hit song "I Fought the Law" replacing "Law" with "War". It also contains a reference to Daddy Warbucks from Annie. They performed the song live at the MuchMusic Video Awards in 2006, which ended with a "stage jump" by lead singer Emily Haines where she jumped into the crowd on Queen Street in Toronto.

During the announcement of the Sony PlayStation 4, the Mstrkrft remix of the song was played in the opening video.

The song appears to refer to the political stance taken by the band in their earlier years, clearly stated by use of anti-war imagery in their music videos, during a time of rising military action. In recent years Emily has stated the song is about post-traumatic stress disorder.

"Monster Hospital" was selected as NME Track of the Week and also featured at number 12 on NME Tracks of 2006.

== Music video ==
The video starts with Emily Haines walking into her living room and inserting Metric's Live It Out record into her record player. As soon as the song starts, the screen turns black and white and hands pull Emily through her carpet. During the first verse, the video interlopes with Emily singing on the floor in the living room and on a bed. When the first chorus begins, we see Jimmy Shaw playing the guitar covered in blood, while Emily sings. Hands are reaching through the roof and walls, trying to grab her (a reference to the 1965 Roman Polanski film Repulsion). During the second verse, Emily is walking down a hallway, looking around in fear as she continues to sing. We go back to Jimmy Shaw during the second chorus. During the bridge and final chorus, blood begins to leak from a lightbulb, a power socket, a television set, and other appliances (probably a reference to Sam Raimi's The Evil Dead). When the song ends, the screen becomes coloured again, and Emily sighs in relief, apparently just dreaming.

== Track listing ==
- CD DiS0021CD
1. "Monster Hospital"
2. "Dead Disco" (Kylie Kills mix)
3. "Monster Hospital" (Mstrkrft remix)
