= Mainstream EP =

EP by Metric
- Released: 1998
- Genre: Indie rock, trip hop
- Length: 21:31
- Label: Chrysalis

Metric chronology
Mainstream EP (1998)	Static Anonymity (2001)

Mainstream is the five-song debut demo EP from the Canadian indie rock band Metric. The album is currently not available in stores, although it is circulated widely on the internet. It was revealed in the 2009 book This Book is Broken, that the band was called "Mainstream" at this time, not "Metric", and Joshua Winstead and Joules Scott-Key had not yet joined.

== Track listing ==
No.	Title	Length
1.	"Butcher"	3:23
2.	"The People"	4:54
3.	"The Battlecry"	5:29
4.	"The Mandate"	3:34
5.	"The Lifestyle"	4:00
