= Metric (band) =

Canadian indie rock band

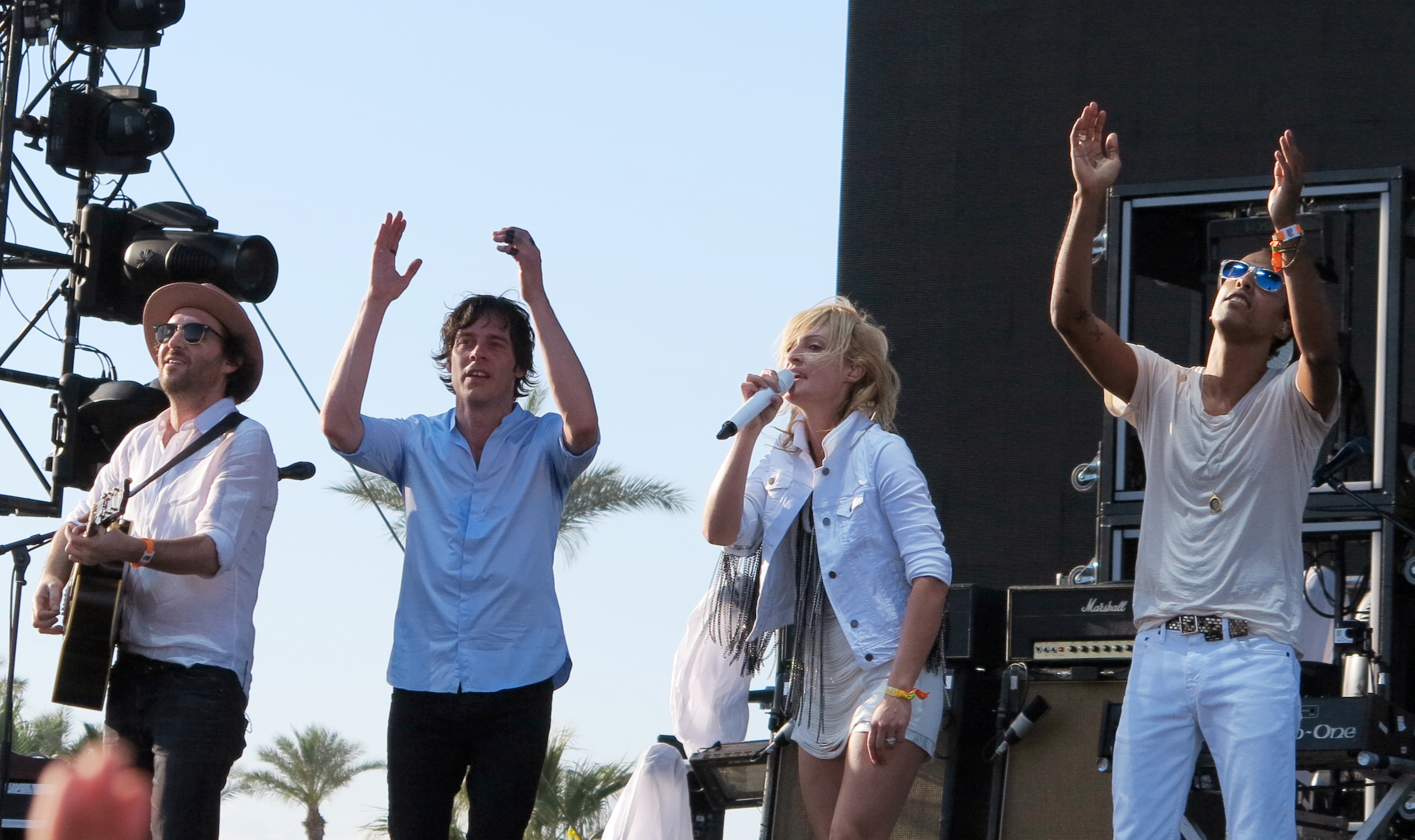
- Metric live at Coachella in April 2013. From left to right: James Shaw, Joules Scott-Key, Emily Haines and Joshua Winstead.

Background information
- Origin: Toronto, Ontario, Canada
- Genres: Indie rock; new wave; post-punk revival; synth-pop; art punk; alternative rock
- Years active: 1998–present
- Labels: Last Gang; Everloving; Metric Music International; Arts & Crafts México; Mom + Pop
- Members: Emily Haines; James Shaw; Joshua Winstead; Joules Scott-Key
- Past members: Jarrett Mason
- Website: ilovemetric.com

Metric is a Canadian indie rock band founded in 1998 in Toronto, Ontario. The band consists of Emily Haines (lead vocals, synthesizers, guitar, tambourine, harmonica, piano), James Shaw (guitar, synthesizers, theremin, backing vocals), Joshua Winstead (bass, synthesizers, backing vocals), and Joules Scott-Key (drums, percussion). The band started in 1998 as a duo formed by Haines and Shaw with the name "Mainstream". After releasing an EP titled Mainstream EP, they changed the band's name to Metric.

The band's first studio album, Old World Underground, Where Are You Now?, was released in 2003. Live It Out, released in 2005, was nominated for the 2006 Polaris Music Prize for the "Canadian Album of the Year" and for the 2006 Juno Awards for "Best Alternative Album". Their third studio album, Grow Up and Blow Away, was recorded in 2001; it was initially planned as their debut album, but was delayed for many years and finally released, with some changes, in 2007.

Metric's fourth album Fantasies was released in 2009. It was shortlisted for the 2009 Polaris Music Prize for "Canadian Album of the Year", and won the "Alternative Album of the Year" at the 2010 Juno Awards. Metric also won the 2010 "Group of the Year". The fifth Metric studio album, Synthetica, was released in 2012. The band won two awards at 2013 Juno Awards: "Alternative Album of the Year" for Synthetica and "Producer of the Year" for Shaw. The art director/designer/photographer Justin Broadbent also won an award for "Recording Package of the Year" for Synthetica. Metric's sixth album, Pagans in Vegas, was released in 2015, and their seventh album, Art of Doubt, was released in 2018. Their eighth and ninth full-length records, Formentera and Formentera II, were released in 2022 and 2023 respectively. This was followed by their tenth album, Romanticize the Dive, in 2026.

In 2023, Metric ranked 41st on Rolling Stone's The 50 Greatest Canadian Artists of All Time.

== History ==
=== Formation and early years ===
Emily Haines was born in New Delhi, India, to American-born parents, and was raised in Fenelon Falls, Ontario. She grew up as a dual citizen of both Canada and the United States. Her father, poet Paul Haines (best known for his lyrical collaboration with Carla Bley in the 1971 jazz opera Escalator over the Hill), often made cassettes of rare and eclectic music for his daughter to listen to, and her early influences included Carla Bley and Robert Wyatt.

Haines attended Etobicoke School of the Arts. There she met Amy Millan (future member of Stars and Broken Social Scene), and Kevin Drew (future member of Broken Social Scene). Haines and Millan briefly formed their first band around 1990 while at ESA. Haines attended the University of British Columbia in Vancouver in 1992–1993, at Toronto in 1995, and at Concordia University in Montreal in 1995–1996. She distributed in 1996 an early album titled Cut in Half and Also Double with a limited number of copies.

James Shaw, who was born in England and raised in Ontario, was attending a Boston music school when he befriended singer Torquil Campbell and Chris Seligman, both future members of the band Stars. Campbell convinced Shaw to apply to Juilliard Music School and the two moved to New York City. Shaw initially studied as a classical trumpet player.

In mid-1996, Haines and Shaw met at Toronto's Horseshoe Tavern. Bonding over a mutual distaste of the music scene, they began dating and writing songs together. In 1997, Shaw released the studio album Life on the Clock which featured Haines singing on some songs. Shaw also moved to Montreal where Haines was living. In 1998, calling themselves Mainstream, the pair self-released the five-song Mainstream EP with an overall downtempo and electronic feel.

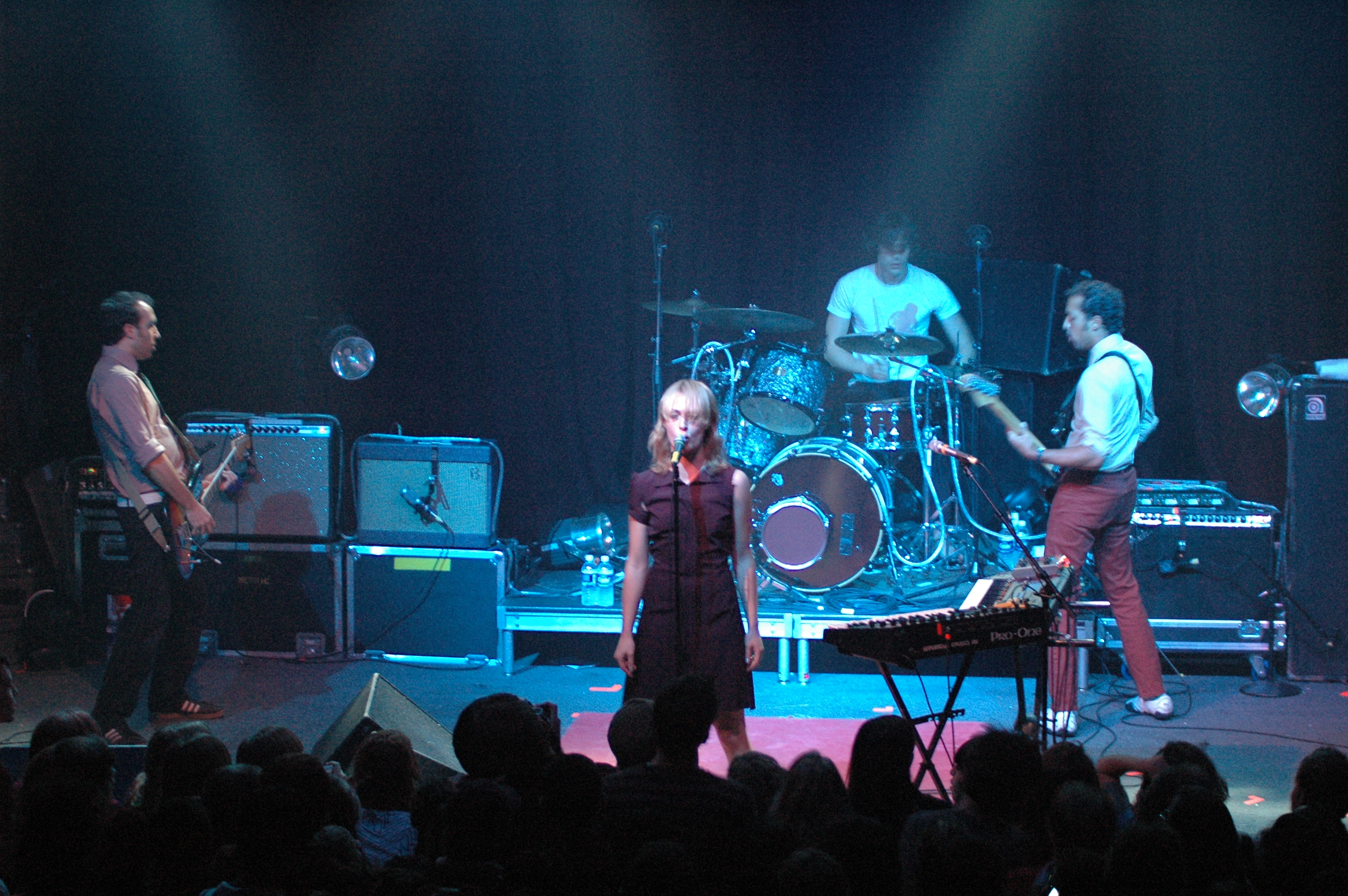
Metric live 2005

At some point in 1998, the band changed its name to Metric, which was originally the name of a sound that Shaw had programmed into his keyboard while working on a song.

In the fall of 1998, Shaw, Haines, Campbell, and Seligman moved back to New York City, where they shared a loft in the Williamsburg neighborhood of Brooklyn. Struggling financially during their two-year stay at the loft, Haines and Shaw were Erstwhile roommates with future members of the Yeah Yeah Yeahs, Liars, and TV on the Radio.

That same year, the band signed a development deal with Warner Bros. Records. A producer in London listened to the demos they recorded in this period and offered to bring Metric to the United Kingdom for a possible record deal. Eager to escape from the crowded conditions of the loft, Haines and Shaw set off to London in early 2000 and signed a publishing deal with Chrysalis Records.

With the help of the producer Stephen Hague, Metric recorded a set of new wave/synthpop drum machine paced songs. The pair tired of recording demos, and in November 2000 returned to their Brooklyn loft to put a band together; they recruited Joules Scott-Key (a native of Flint, Michigan) as their drummer and Jarrett Mason as their bassist.

=== Grow Up and Blow Away (2001–2002) ===
Metric continued to work on their debut album in the first few months of 2001. Now dubbed Grow Up and Blow Away, they developed a more musically layered and mature sound than the earlier Mainstream EP. Haines and Shaw completed the album in April and by this time had found a new label for their release, the Los Angeles indie label Restless Records. However, the album, produced by Shaw, was delayed for years by the label. It was finally released in 2007 on Last Gang Records.

Grow Up and Blow Away included the uptempo songs "Grow Up and Blow Away", "Raw Sugar", and "Soft Rock Star", as well as downtempo songs "White Gold", "The Twist", and "Rock Me Now" (which included falsetto singing by Shaw and spoken-word vocals by Haines in a manner reminiscent of "The Mandate", and had an overall jazzy vibe). "Parkdale", featuring trumpeting by Shaw and a fanfare intro, concerned the Parkdale, Toronto neighborhood. When the track titled "Rock Me Now" was reworked, it had been stripped of its intro "bubble" sounds, as well as an additional vocal part was added to the bridge. The title track was also reworked during the chorus, in which, Haines vocalizes "If this is the life, why does it feel so good to die today?" and the synths get a more "heavier" feel.

In the same year, the band released Static Anonymity, a five-song EP which they sold only at Metric performances and on their official site. Three tracks from the EP were also included on Grow Up and Blow Away.

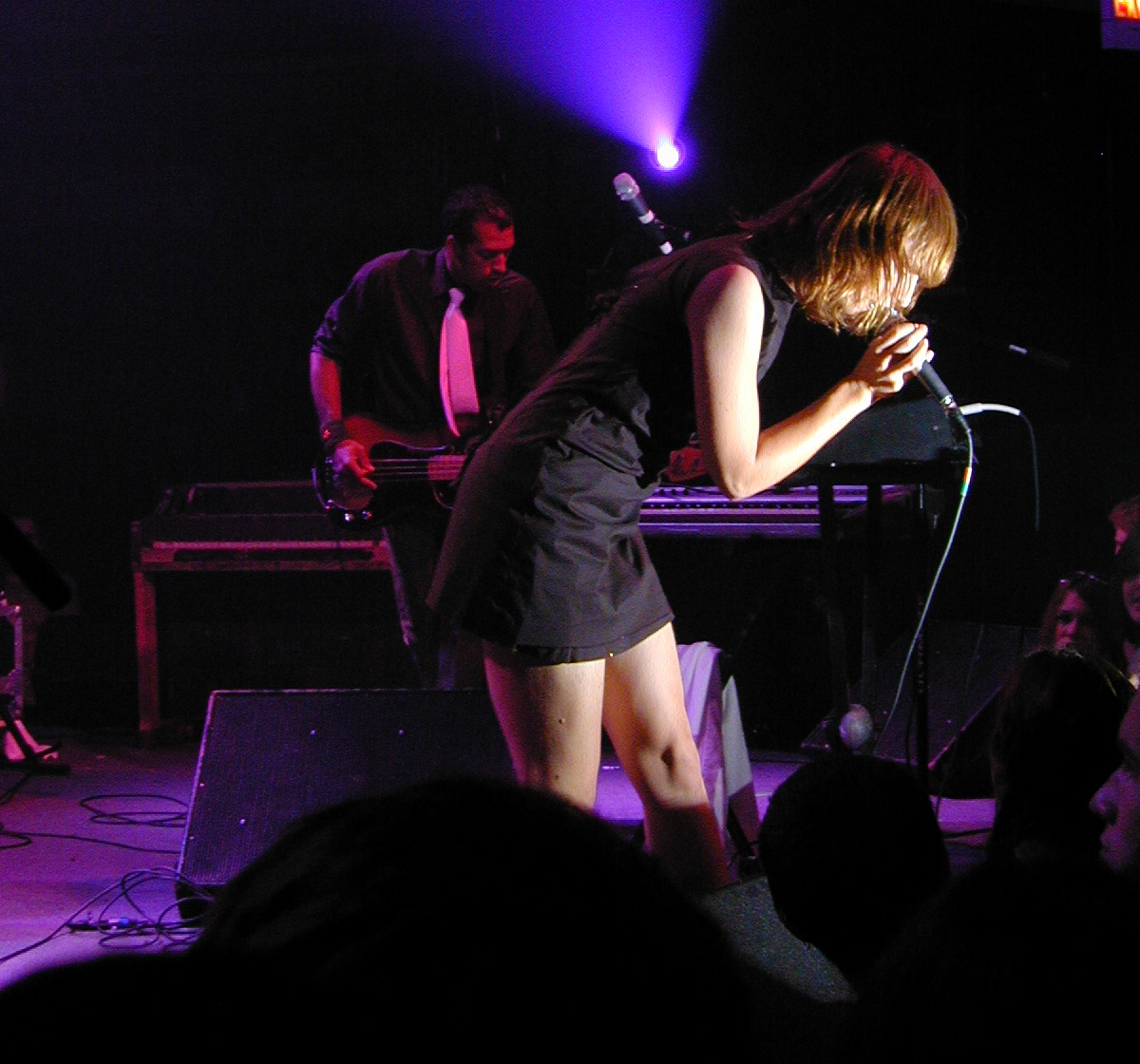
Metric live at the 9:30 Club, 2004

Metric up to this time had been for the most part a studio band; live shows could not reproduce the synthesizer-centered and drum machine-driven sound of the recordings. After recruiting a drummer to allow a stronger, more engaging live presence, Metric performed in New York in 2001. They handed out handmade CD-R copies of their unreleased music to fans at shows and by mail, and later gave away the music on the internet.

In August 2001, the television commercial "Be Afraid", advertising Polaroid's I-Zone Pocket Fortune film, used music from the song "Grow Up and Blow Away", with the line "Why does it feel so good to die today?" changed to "Why does it feel so good to fly today?".

In March 2002, Metric performed at Canadian Music Week. The band's performance was criticized in an article in University of Waterloo's newspaper Imprint, where the reviewer referred to the band's music as "derivative, pretentious, boring pap at its most mediocre".

By the end of 2002, Metric had gained another bandmate: the bassist Joshua Winstead (a native of Texas), who was in town performing with long-time friend Scott-Key in the local music scene.

=== Old World Underground, Where Are You Now? (2003–2004) ===
In 2003, Metric released their first official studio album Old World Underground, Where Are You Now? on Everloving Records and shortly thereafter it appeared on the !earshot National Top 50 radio chart. The album was produced by Michael Andrews and recorded at Elgonix Labs, Los Angeles. The band then moved to Los Angeles, where they performed locally, often playing at Silverlake Lounge and Spaceland. Old World Underground, Where Are You Now? received generally positive reviews. In December 2005, the album was certified gold in Canada.

The songs "Combat Baby" and "Dead Disco" were released as singles. "Combat Baby" was featured as a free single on iTunes in 2004. Six music videos were created to promote the album and accompany "Calculation Theme", "IOU", "Combat Baby", "Succexy", and "Dead Disco" respectively.

Metric was featured as themselves in the 2004 independent French film, Clean, directed by Olivier Assayas and starring Maggie Cheung. The band performed the song "Dead Disco" in the film and also acted in a short sequence. The film, which also featured songs by Brian Eno, Daniel Lanois, and Tricky, was nominated for the Palme D'Or award at the Cannes Film Festival.

=== Live It Out and Grow Up and Blow Away (2005–2007) ===
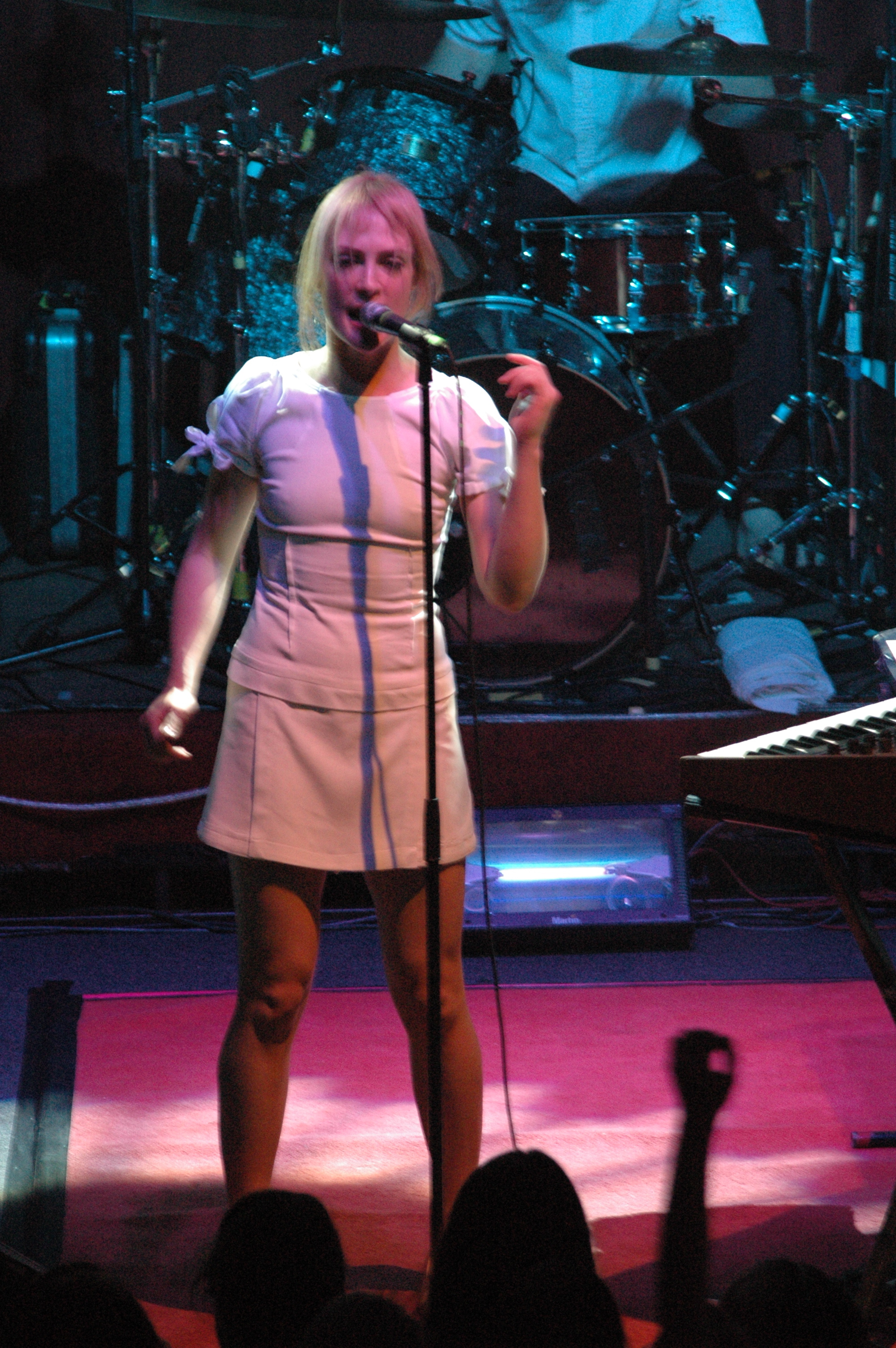
Metric live at the 9:30 Club in Washington, DC (2006)

On October 4, 2005, Metric released their second studio album, Live It Out, on Last Gang Records. The album, produced by Shaw, was well received by critics and fans, and eventually went twice platinum in Canada, selling over 200,000 units.

Three singles supported the album's sales: "Monster Hospital" (number 55 on UK singles charts), "Poster of a Girl", and "Empty". "Monster Hospital" was selected as NME Track of the Week and was number 12 on NME Tracks of 2006. Live It Out as well as number 38 on NME Recordings of 2006.

During this time, Metric opened for the Rolling Stones, whose tour coincided with theirs in New York City. The band did a UK-wide tour supporting Bloc Party as well as performing at Reading and Leeds Festival, The Great Escape in Brighton, Wireless Festival at Hyde Park in London and club dates throughout the UK. The band toured the world extensively for several years playing concerts in France, Germany, Iceland, Brazil, Greece, Italy, Turkey, the Netherlands, Finland, Belgium, Sweden, Norway, United States, Canada, Venezuela, Mexico, and Japan to promote Live it Out.

On June 26, 2007, Last Gang Records released Metric's 2001 album Grow Up and Blow Away, with an altered track listing compared to the unofficial version. There were added the songs "London Halflife" and "Soft Rock Star" (Jimmy vs. Joe mix) from the 2001 EP Static Anonymity and removed the songs "Torture Me", "Fanfare", and "Parkdale". The tracks were reordered and some songs (including the title track and "Rock Me Now") were slightly reworked.

Throughout the summer of 2007, four new songs were road-tested by the band, tentatively named "Black Sheep", "The Hooks", "Stadium Love", and "Up in Flames". On October that year Metric played a live webcast show on Myspace's "Hey Play This" programme, playing requests sent in by fans. Along with old material, they performed several new songs, including "Freddie" (aka "Black Sheep"), "Standing in Line", "Gimme Sympathy" (aka "The Hooks"), "Twilight", "Joyride", and "Stadium Love".

On November 13, 2007, Last Gang Records released a trailer on YouTube for a Metric DVD showcasing a live concert at the Metropolis Theatre in Montreal, as well as all three music videos from Live It Out. The DVD Live at Metropolis was released on February 12, 2008. A three-track EP was released on iTunes in December, featuring the live tracks "The Police and the Private", "Too Little Too Late", and "Patriarch on a Vespa" from the DVD, as well as the DVD trailer.

=== Fantasies (2008–2011) ===
The band performed in 2008 in Canada, Mexico and Brazil while continuing to record their upcoming fourth album. They performed at the 2008 Coachella Festival, and at the 2008 Ottawa Bluesfest; this was in addition to playing at the inaugural Pemberton Music Festival in Pemberton, British Columbia in July and All Points West Music & Arts Festival in New Jersey in August.

During December 13–23, 2008, Metric toured across Canada with Tokyo Police Club, The Dears, and Sebastien Grainger and The Mountains, to raise money for various charities under the name "Jingle Bell Rock" tour. "Help, I'm Alive" was released as the lead single from the upcoming album on iTunes on December 23, 2008 in Canada and January 1, 2009 elsewhere.

Their fourth record, Fantasies, was self-released on April 7, 2009 through Last Gang Records in Canada, and their own label, Metric Music International. The album was produced by Gavin Brown and by Shaw; it was recorded at the band's Giant Studios in Toronto, and Electric Lady Studios, New York. Fantasies was issued in a standard edition (featuring 10 tracks), a deluxe edition (including 4 more tracks), a deluxe edition UK edition (including 10 more tracks), and later, an Expanded Edition (a second disc with 10 tracks).

A fusion of new wave and loud rock, Fantasies was generally well received by critics and fans. By 2012, it had sold 500,000 copies, the band's best selling album so far. Haines and Shaw had performed all ten tracks acoustically the previous September at Union Pool in Brooklyn.

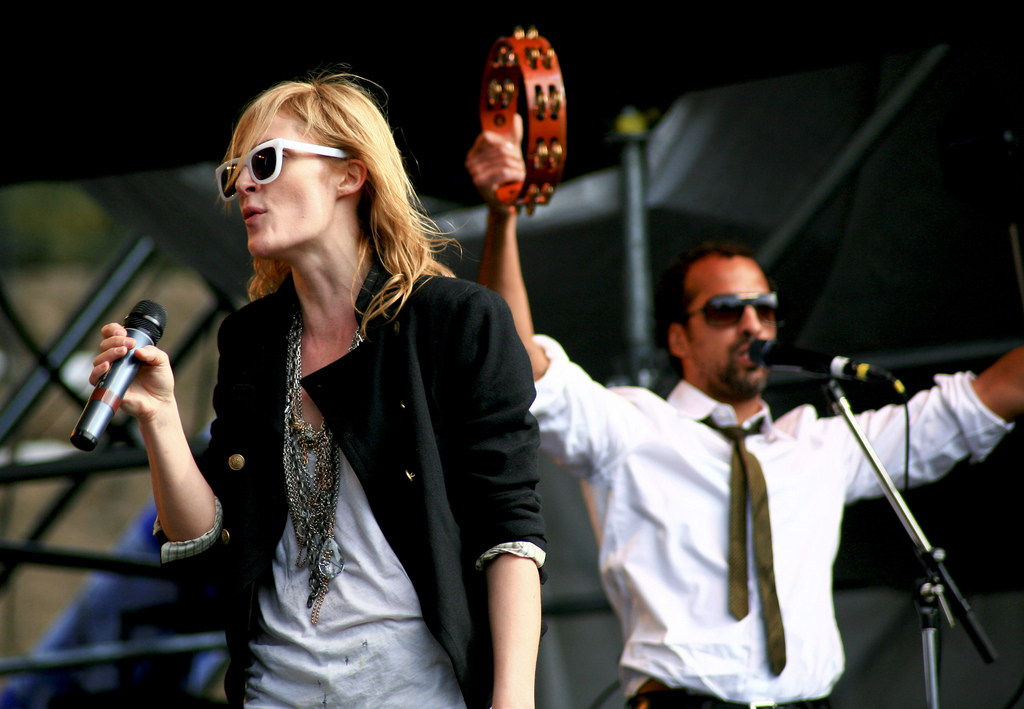
Emily Haines and Josh Winstead performing with Metric, 2009

The music video for "Gimme Sympathy" was released on Myspace on March 16, 2009. Haines and Shaw completed a mini tour of acoustic shows across Canada, with stops in Winnipeg, Edmonton, Calgary, Vancouver, and Victoria in late April with cooperation from local radio stations. The band finished a Europe tour in May 2009 and toured the US (with Sebastien Grainger and The Mountains and Smile Smile), UK, and Canada at music festivals during the summer. They then headed to Australia for their first Australian tour in early October, and performed a show in Tokyo.

In August of that year, Mike Shinoda of Linkin Park fame began streaming a remix of the track "Gold Guns Girls" through his website. The track was the theme for his art exhibition Glorious Excess (Dies), and later became part of a compilation album set up by Linkin Park's Music for Relief for victims of the 2010 Haiti earthquake.

In October 2009, Metric released a five-track EP called Plug in Plug Out containing acoustic versions of songs from Fantasies, which was available on Amazon for 30 days. In of December that year, the band produced a charity T-shirt for the Yellow Bird Project to raise funding to promote musical education across Canada. The T-shirt bears the slogan 'Keep the dream tight' — a lyric from their song, "Hustle Rose".

Haines and Shaw performed an acoustic version of "Help I'm Alive" on January 22, 2010 for the Canada for Haiti telethon. During the 2010 Winter Olympics, Metric, along with several other Canadian music acts, came together in Vancouver to re-record K'Naan's song "Wavin' Flag" to benefit Haiti in a movement called Young Artists for Haiti. Haines and Shaw also performed at a Neil Young tribute event alongside their friends in Broken Social Scene. It was at this event that Haines met Lou Reed, leading to later collaborations between the two of them.

The track "Black Sheep" was released on August 10, 2010, and became available on the band's Myspace page. The song is on the soundtrack for the film Scott Pilgrim vs. the World. In the movie, the song is sung by Brie Larson, who portrayed Envy Adams in the film. Scott Pilgrim author Bryan Lee O'Malley said he was inspired by concert photos of Haines while originally drawing Envy's singing poses.

The band toured in Western USA, before playing shows in the Canadian Maritimes and Eastern Ontario for most of March 2010. Metric also toured with Sarah McLachlan for part of her 2010 Lilith Fair.

Metric won two awards ("Group of the Year" and "Alternative Album of the Year" for Fantasies) at the 2010 Juno Awards.

On June 8, 2010, the third installment in the Twilight film series featured Metric in its soundtrack. Twilight Saga: Eclipse soundtrack was released featuring Metric's song "Eclipse (All Yours)". The song was written with the film's composer, Howard Shore. An acoustic version of the song can be found on the Expanded Edition of Fantasies. On July 21, 2010, the band performed the song on The Tonight Show with Jay Leno.

During October and November 2010, Metric opened for Muse for seven shows of The Resistance Tour. Later that year, the band was part of the lineup for Voodoo Experience 2010, which took place over Halloween weekend in New Orleans, Louisiana, US.

On January 4, 2011, Metric released an iTunes Session EP exclusively on iTunes, consisting of eight live tracks, including "Hustle Rose", "Empty", and a cover of the Buffalo Springfield song "Expecting to Fly", and a 30-minute interview.

In October 2011, Metric released a collection of remixes from Fantasies entitled Fantasies Flashbacks through a collaboration with website Indaba Music. The band released all the individual tracks as well as their stems so that the general public could remix the songs. The songs were then submitted online to Indaba and the band chose the winning remixes for the album. An unofficial album Electrified Fantasies featuring 14 remixes of songs of the album "Fantasies" appeared in January 2012. The tracks were selected from 1767 remixes that arose from the official remix contest and are licensed under a Creative Commons license.

=== Synthetica and Cosmopolis (2012–2014) ===
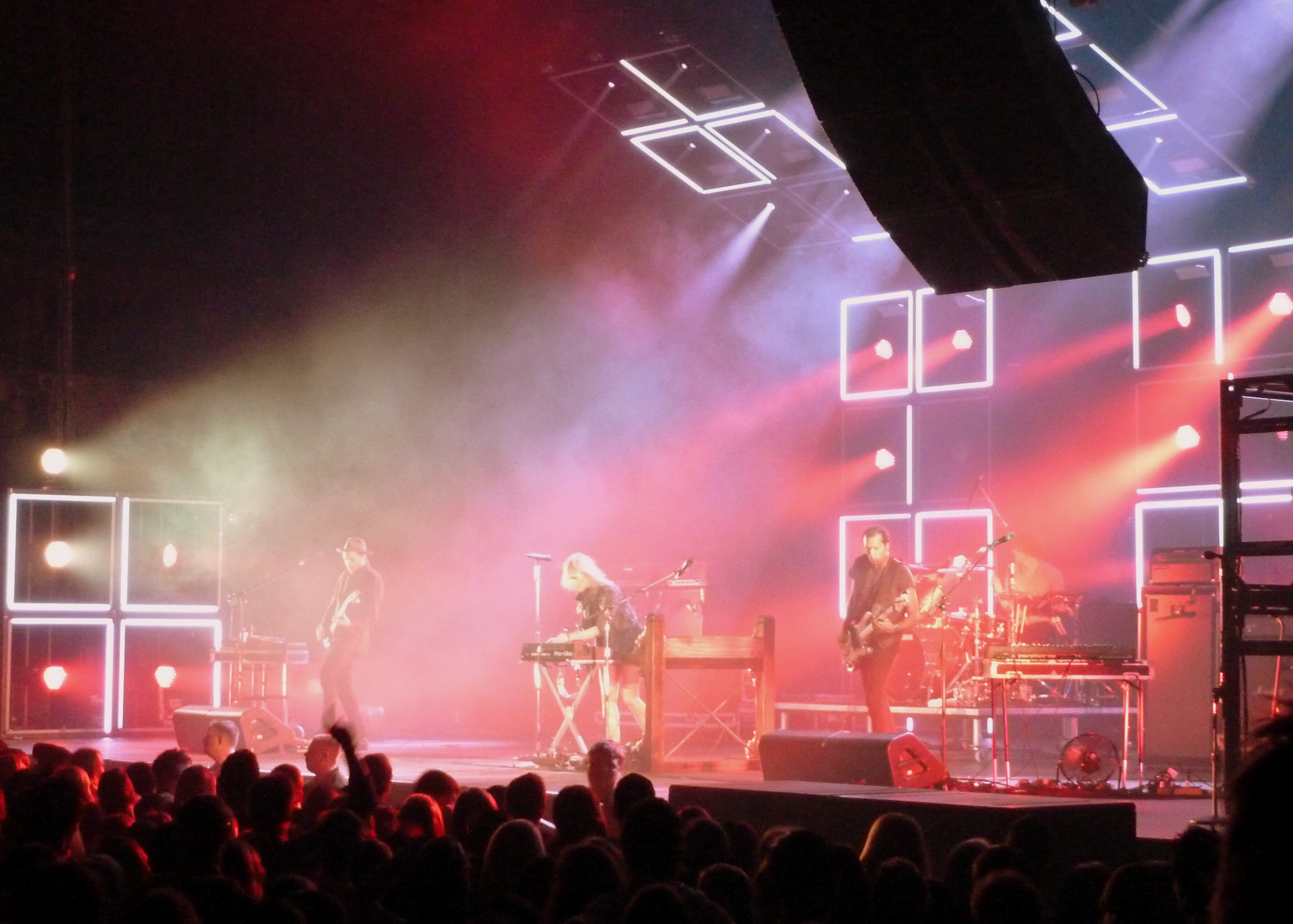
Metric on their 2012 cross-Canada arena tour

The band's fifth studio album, Synthetica, was released on June 12, 2012 on the band's own label, Metric Music International; the album received generally positive reviews. Synthetica was produced by Gavin Brown, John O'Mahony, Liam O'Neil, James Shaw, and it was recorded at Giant Studios (Metric's own studio) and Electric Lady Studios. The album also included a collaboration with Lou Reed, who sang with Haines on "The Wanderlust". For iTunes pre-orders, they included five instrumental bonus tracks, that were the basis of five songs from the album. A deluxe version, with five additional acoustic tracks, was released on November 20, 2012.

The album's first single "Youth Without Youth" was released to the internet on April 30, 2012. The single was the first song in history to debut at number one on the Canadian Alternative Rock Charts. This was followed by a sneak preview of "Speed the Collapse", which was released to the internet on May 23, 2012.

On May 29, 2012, the band started a hide and seek hunt for fans to access an early stream of Synthetica. The secretive stream became available on the band's SoundCloud page. A few days later the stream became publicly available.

In late 2011, it was announced that the band would be contributing to the soundtrack of David Cronenberg's 2012 drama film entitled Cosmopolis. Songs were co-written by the band with film composer Howard Shore as well as an appearance by K'naan on one track. This was the second time that the band collaborated with Shore after their previous work on the Twilight Saga: Eclipse soundtrack. The soundtrack was released on June 5, 2012 in Canada and on July 10, 2012 in the United States.

In June 2012, Metric performed as part of the NXNE festival in Toronto.

On August 21, 2012, the first episode of a documentary about the making of Synthetica, covering events at the band's home studio in Toronto and recording sessions at New York's Electric Lady Studios, was released on the band's YouTube channel. The band wrapped up a 25-tour dates US Tour on October 14, 2012. They embarked on their first arena tour across Canada, which started in Victoria, British Columbia, on November 9, 2012 and ended November 24, 2012 at Air Canada Centre in Toronto, Ontario.

On November 20, 2012, Metric released a deluxe version of Synthetica, which featured acoustic versions of songs on the album, as well as a cover of "Strange Weather" by Tom Waits. In April 2013, they performed at Coachella Festival.

The band won three awards at 2013 Juno Awards: "Alternative Album of the Year" for Synthetica and "Producer of the Year" for James Shaw. The art director/designer/photographer Justin Broadbent also won an award for "Recording Package of the Year" for Synthetica. In June 2013, Synthetica was longlisted for the 2013 Polaris Music Prize.

On July 1, 2013, Metric performed at Parliament Hill on Canada Day for then-Prime Minister Stephen Harper.

The band spent 2014 writing for their upcoming sixth studio album. They also played at several festivals around North America including a return to Pemberton Music Festival (the band played the original 2008 festival), Riot Fest, and Made In America LA.

=== Pagans in Vegas (2015–2017) ===
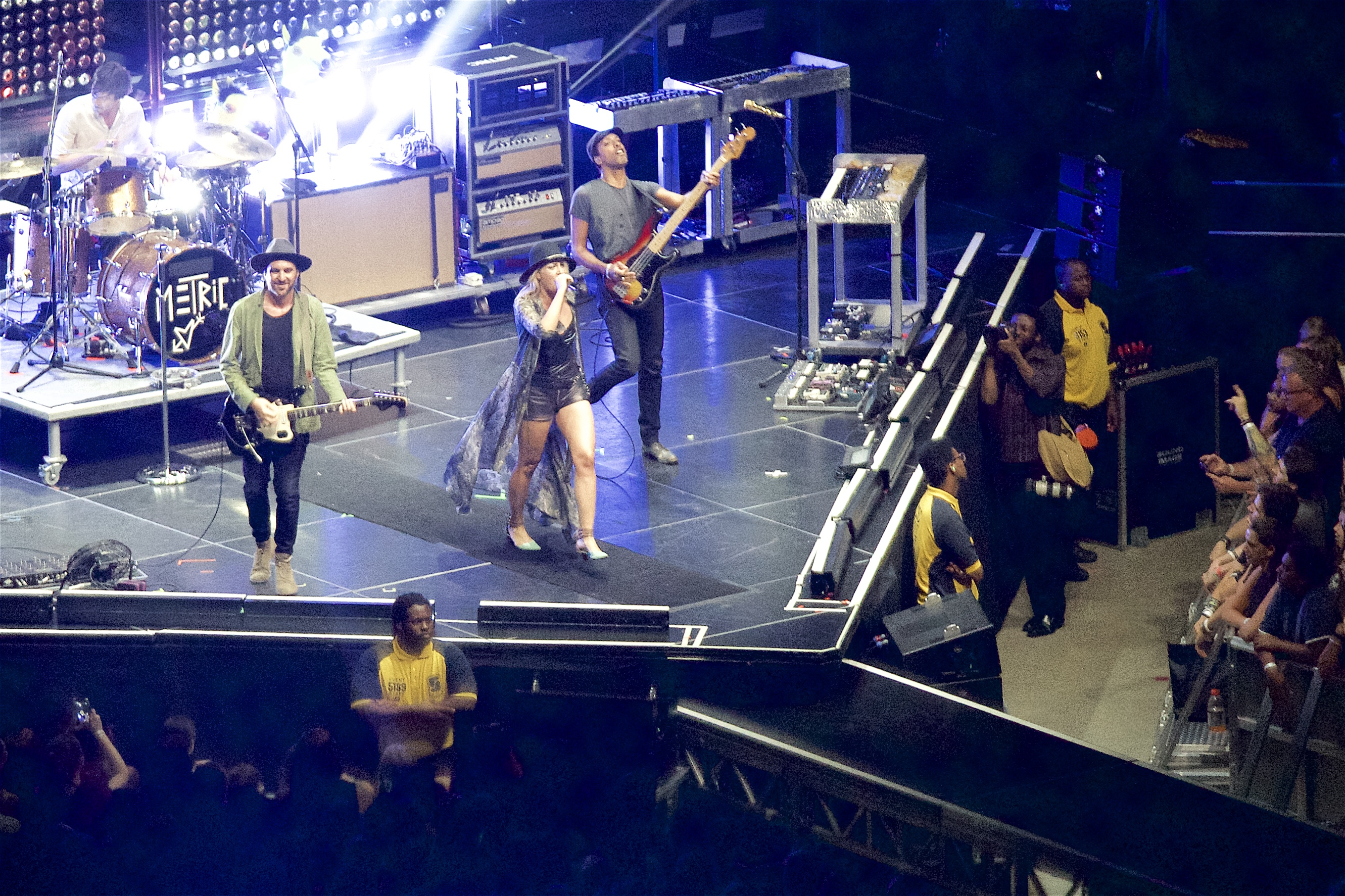
Metric opening for Imagine Dragons in July 2015

In December 2014, it was announced Metric would be appearing in early 2015 on a new series called Sessions X alongside artists like The Trews, Dear Rouge, and Buck 65. In a preview, Haines and Shaw revealed they'd be playing two new tracks entitled "I Forget Why" and "All In A Day". They also will perform new acoustic versions of "The Police and the Private" and "Dreams So Real". An unfinished track entitled "The Fatal Gift", released at this time, later ended up being reworked as an Emily Haines & The Soft Skeleton track, and was released as the lead single for her 2017 record Choir of the Mind.

On May 11, 2015, Metric released "The Shade", the first single off their upcoming album. The single marked a noted departure for the new record from Metric's more guitar oriented synth rock, and leaned more heavily on synthesizers, with electronic and pop stylings.

In June 2015, Metric released a track from their upcoming album, Pagans in Vegas, entitled "Cascades". They created an app called "The Pagan Portal" to debut their song "Too Bad, So Sad". Pagans in Vegas was released in September, and appeared on the !earshot National Top 50 Chart in December that year. After recording an untitled companion album to Pagans in Vegas, some of it in Nashville, the concept was eventually scrapped.

Metric toured with Imagine Dragons over the summer of 2015. They then toured Europe, the southern US, and Mexico throughout the fall of 2015. The band announced on November 17 that they would tour the United States with Joywave as support. On December 8, 2015, they announced a Canadian tour in the spring of 2016, co-headlining with Death Cab for Cutie. They also performed in New York that spring.

Metric were nominated for Group of the Year at the 2016 Juno Awards. Throughout 2017 the band took a break, with Shaw and Haines both contributing to the Broken Social Scene record Hug of Thunder, and Haines releasing new solo material for the first time in 10 years with her Emily Haines & The Soft Skeleton record, Choir of the Mind.

=== Dreams So Real and Art of Doubt (2018–2021) ===
In early 2018, it was announced Metric and PledgeMusic were releasing a concert film based on their "Lights on the Horizon" tour, entitled Dreams So Real. The release of the eOne-distributed Blu-ray/DVD concert film was screened in over 30 movie house screenings across North America and one in Australia. The band appeared at the March 23 screening at Toronto's TIFF Lightbox for a Q&A session. Dreams So Real was produced and directed by Jeff Rogers and T. Edward Martin, partners in Media Goes HERE. Using a Pledge Music campaign, the 4K, Ultra HD, concert documentary captured the group's live performance at Vancouver's Thunderbird Sports Centre using 24 cameras on the final show of a year-long sold-out world tour. A triple live vinyl recording of the concert, exclusively available on Pledge, had a limited-edition run of 1000 pressings.

Metric worked on their seventh full-length record with producer Justin Meldal-Johnson, who is known for his work with Beck, Nine Inch Nails, and M83. Recording sessions took place at EastWest Studios and the band's own studio in Toronto. The band headlined Toronto's Field Trip Festival on June 2, 2018, where they played a special set consisting of their 2009 record Fantasies played front to back, then two new songs followed by a few hits.

A single, titled "Dark Saturday", from the band's upcoming album, was released on July 12, 2018. A music video for "Dark Saturday," which was shot entirely on an iPhone X, was released on July 17, 2018, along with a link to pre-order the upcoming album, although at that time no title or track listing had been confirmed. A second song from the record, "Dressed to Suppress," was released on July 26, 2018. Throughout the summer of 2018 the band supported The Smashing Pumpkins on their Shiny And Oh So Bright Tour reunion. They capped off the summer playing the inaugural SKOOKUM Festival in Stanley Park in Vancouver, British Columbia.

After releasing a single, "Now or Never Now" in August, the band released their seventh album, Art of Doubt, through the MMI/Universal label on September 21, 2018. The album favoured a more guitar driven sound than their previous one. The band played their first ever show in Moscow, Russia, and then toured throughout Europe over the fall and winter of 2018. They then co-headlined a tour across the United States with Mexican psychedelic band Zoé, with July Talk as support. A cross-Canada arena tour followed (without Zoé) with July Talk as direct support. The band toured Mexico throughout June, supporting Zoé, and then appeared at select festivals over the summer of 2019, including Osheaga, and Lollapalooza Paris. The band performed at Austin City Limits on October 5 and 12 2019. In between the dates, they returned to Mexico City for one final show supporting Art Of Doubt.

On November 1, 2019, the band released the track "Common Lives", recorded in collaboration with Zoé during their tour dates in Mexico.

In November 2019, Emily and Jimmy performed 4 acoustic shows at the Funhouse in Toronto, a now defunct "immersive art experience and venue", where fans selected the setlist by submitting requests and the story behind why they chose it. Each show was limited to 200 tickets, and was recorded in full and pressed onto a limited edition vinyl.

The band had been announced to headline the CBC Music Festival in Toronto, on May 30, 2020, along with acts such as Half Moon Run and Lights. Due to the COVID-19 pandemic, the festival was cancelled. Over 2020, also due to the pandemic, the band was separated by the US/Canada border closure, with Haines and Shaw being in Canada, and Winstead and Scott-Key being in the United States. The band celebrated the 15 year anniversary of Live It Out with exclusive merch items. Haines and Shaw released a series of "Dirt Road Versions" of the band's tracks throughout the year, all pressed on 7 inch vinyl with limited runs.

The band released their first Greatest Hits compilation on November 26, 2021, featuring 10 tracks: "Combat Baby", "Gold Guns Girls", "Help I'm Alive", "Now or Never Now", "Breathing Underwater", "Cascades", "Black Sheep", "Empty", "Synthetica", and an acoustic version of "Gimme Sympathy" recorded at the Funhouse during the band's 2019 residency. The limited-edition release was pressed exclusively on vinyl, and was limited to only 2,500 copies.

=== Formentera and Formentera II (2022–2024) ===
On March 29, 2022, Metric announced they would be headlining Budweiser Stage in Toronto, on August 26, 2022, with Spoon and Interpol as support. In a letter to fans, Emily mentioned they had been working on new music alongside the announcement. The band also announced a show in Mexico City with Young the Giant for May 20, 2022.

On April 28, 2022, Metric released "All Comes Crashing", the first single from their album Formentera. The band also announced a North American tour with Dear Rouge and Bartees Strange as support in Canada.

The band released the 10-minute single "Doomscroller" on May 18, 2022, followed by the single "What Feels Like Eternity" on June 8, 2022, ahead of the record's release. The record released on July 8, 2022, to generally positive reviews.

In February 2023, it was announced Metric will be special guests of the Garbage and Noel Gallagher's High Flying Birds Summer 2023 co-headline tour exclusively on the US dates.

On July 7, 2023, the band announced their ninth album, Formentera II would release October 13, 2023, and released "Just the Once" as the lead single from it.

Scott Pilgrim Takes Off featured a Metric cover of the Sarah McLachlan song "I Will Remember You," with Haines as the singing voice of Envy Adams. A version of "Black Sheep" is briefly used in the anime, with the lyrics sung by the crowd.

=== Romanticize the Dive (2026–present) ===
On January 23, 2026, the band shared a snippet of their upcoming single “Victim of Luck” to their Instagram account, set for release on February 3. Along with the single's release they also announced their 10th studio album Romanticize the Dive for release on April 24th 2026 via Thirty Tigers records. The band released their second single "Time is a Bomb" on March 4, 2026. Along with the album, a North American tour was also announced with support from Broken Social Scene and Stars.

== Side projects ==
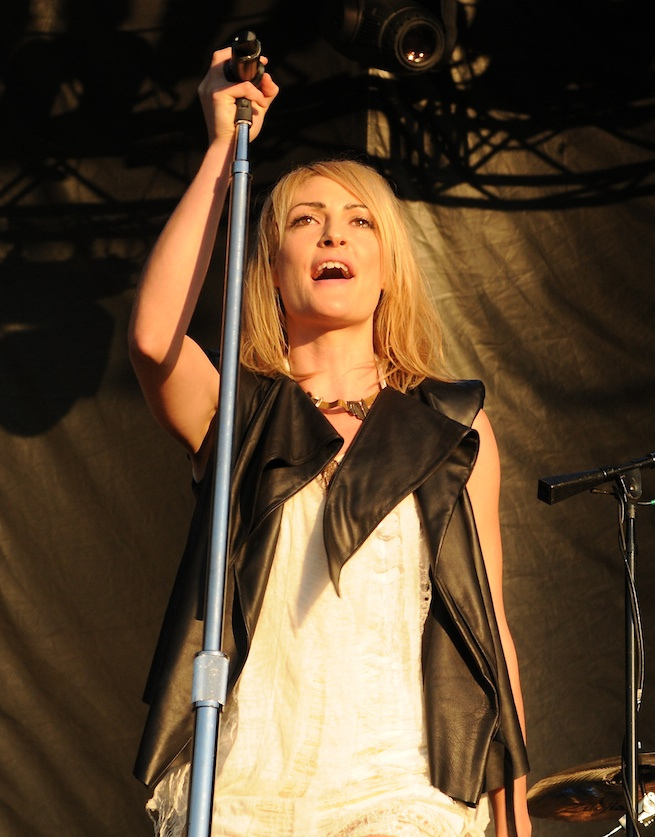
Emily Haines performing with Metric at Ottawa Bluesfest 2011

Emily Haines and James Shaw also perform with Broken Social Scene. Haines featured as one of the vocalists on their albums You Forgot It in People, Bee Hives, Broken Social Scene and Forgiveness Rock Record. One of Broken Social Scene's most popular songs, "Anthems for a Seventeen Year Old Girl", is sung by Haines.

Haines has also been a guest on albums by artists like Stars, KC Accidental, The Stills, Jason Collett, The Crystal Method, Tiësto, Delerium, k-os, and Todor Kobakov.

In 1996, Haines released a solo album entitled Cut in Half and Also Double. Under the "Emily Haines and the Soft Skeleton" moniker, she released the 2006 studio album Knives Don't Have Your Back, followed in 2007 by the EP What Is Free to a Good Home?. The album and the EP are a collection of piano-driven songs backed with soft strings and horns. The songs "Our Hell" and "Doctor Blind" were issued as singles with music videos.

In 1997, Shaw released his studio album, Life on the Clock, which featured Haines singing on some tracks. The songs "Down" and "Tortury" were later reworked as Metric songs, with the latter being renamed to "Torture Me". The reworked version of "Down" featured later on the 2001 EP Static Anonymity and "Torture Me" on the unreleased version of the album Grow Up and Blow Away.

Scott-Key and Winstead have a side project, the band Bang Lime. The band released the album Best Friends in Love on August 14, 2007 on Last Gang Records.

As of late August 2013, Haines was involved with FLEET4HEARme, a collaboration with Fleet Jewelry, and HearMe—the latter is an organization that aims to increase children's access to music programs in public schools. In support of the project, Haines explained: "I feel like anybody who wants to play an instrument should be able to."

In September 2015, Rudsak unveiled a leather jacket customized by Haines. The jacket is a classic black motorcycle style with lyrics from "The Governess" on the back.

Winstead released a solo album MMXX on June 3, 2016. In the fall of 2016, Winstead performed tour dates in support of his album.

Haines released her first solo record in 11 years, Choir of the Mind, on September 5, 2017. A small North American tour took place in the winter of 2017 through venues hand picked by Haines, including Massey Hall in Toronto, Hollywood Forever Cemetery in Los Angeles, and Chan Centre for the Performing Arts in Vancouver.

Metric partnered with Plus 1 to support GRID Alternatives to bring accessible renewable energy technology to underserved communities.

== Music style and perspectives ==
Metric's music style has been described as indie rock and alternative rock, with elements of new wave, post-punk revival, synth-pop, and dance-rock. Sounds generated by synthesizers are prominent in their songs.

Their sound evolved from the mellow/downtempo style of their early EPs and Grow Up and Blow Away album, to the new wave style of Old World Underground, Where Are You Now?, then more hard rock on Live It Out, then to the accessible indie rock of Fantasies, and to the more grandiose of Synthetica, and then the electronic of Pagans in Vegas, later fusing this with their gothic rock and new wave styles for Art of Doubt. Some of their songs (like "IOU", "Succexy", "Combat Baby", "Monster Hospital") include anti-war messages.

The band also recorded many covers from artists like Bob Dylan, Pink Floyd, Pet Shop Boys, The Church, Death from Above 1979, Brenda Lee, Tom Waits, Neil Young, Blondie, The Strokes, Morrissey, Tame Impala and Elliott Smith. They also released many acoustic versions of some of their own songs on deluxe versions of some of their albums.

== Touring ==
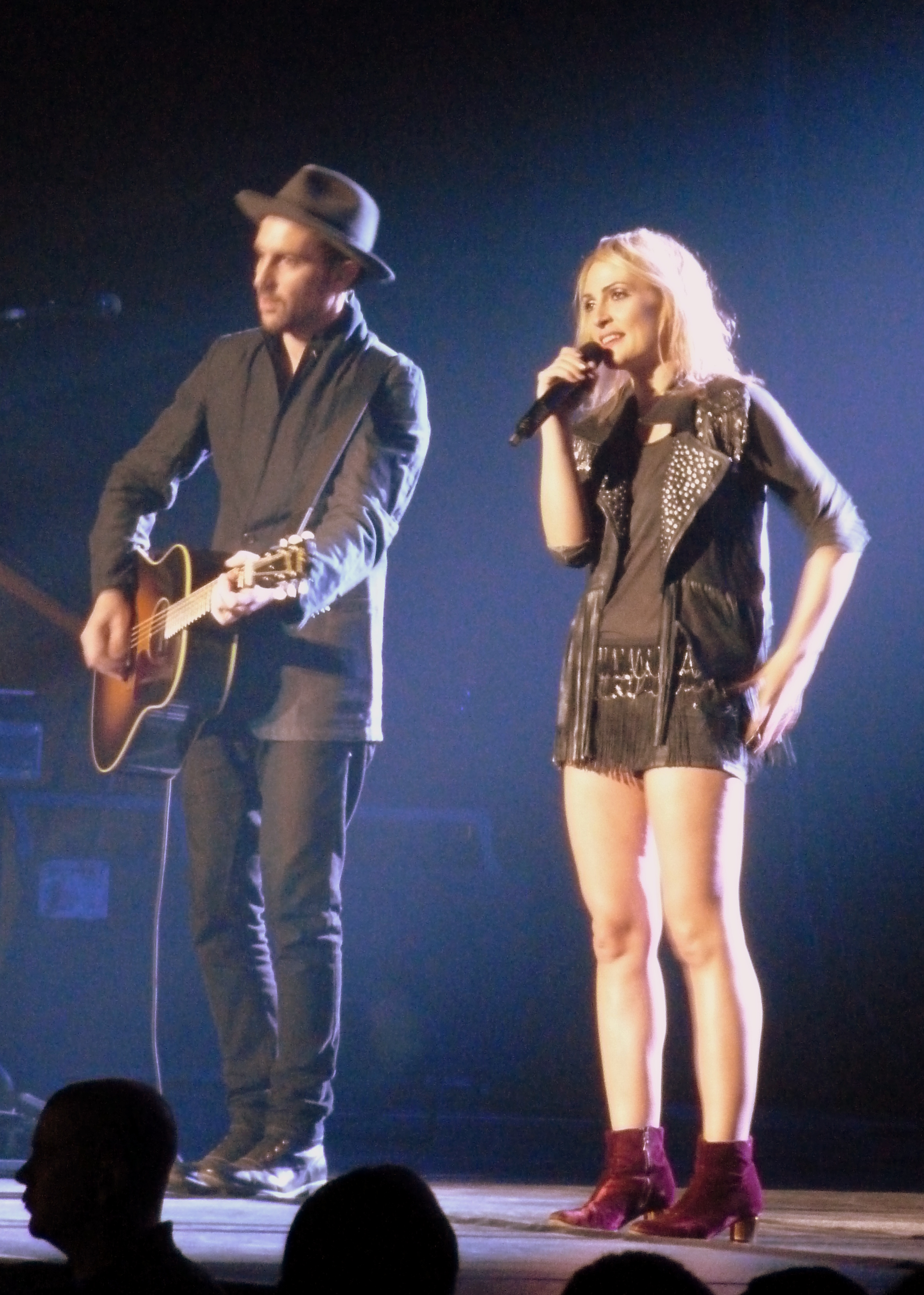
James Shaw and Emily Haines performing at Budweiser Gardens in London, Ontario, 2012

Metric has toured extensively in North America, South America and Europe, but also have toured through Australia, The Philippines, and Japan.

During Metric live performances, Haines sings and plays two synthesizers and occasionally plays a tambourine or a guitar. One of the two synthesizers is a Sequential Circuits Pro-One, which she has played at every live performance with the whole band since the Grow Up and Blow Away era. Her other keyboard is a Nord Wave with a custom built stand. James Shaw plays guitar and Winstead plays bass. Both Shaw and Winstead occasionally play a synthesizer each, and also sing backing vocals. Joules Scott-Key plays drums.

The band is also known for their acoustic performances as a duo, with Haines singing and/or playing various instruments (piano, harmonica, tambourine) and James Shaw playing the acoustic guitar and occasionally singing.

Metric has performed at music festivals around the world, including Coachella, Osheaga, Bluesfest, Pemberton, All Points West, Glastonbury, Bumbershoot, Virgin Festival, Download Festival, Pukkelpop, Squamish, SXSW, Sasquatch!, La Route Du Rock, The Great Escape, Edgefest, Reading and Leeds Festival, Rock Werchter, Wireless, Splendour in the Grass, Lollapalooza, Austin City Limits, and the Hillside Festival. They also collaborated with Lou Reed.

Metric performed at various radio stations (including KCRW, 3VOOR12, BBC 6Music, XFM) and various TV shows (The Tonight Show with Jay Leno, Late Night with Conan O'Brien, Late Show with David Letterman, The Late Late Show with Craig Ferguson, VH1 Divas, Later... with Jools Holland, Jimmy Kimmel Live!, Last Call with Carson Daly).

Metric opened for The Rolling Stones, Muse, Imagine Dragons, Billy Talent, Bloc Party, Hot Hot Heat, Modest Mouse, Death From Above 1979, Broken Social Scene, Arcade Fire, and Paramore. Metric and Death Cab for Cutie co-headlined on their Lights On The Horizon Tour.

Bands that opened for Metric include artists like Joywave, Phantogram, Secret Machines, Dear Rouge, Crystal Castles, Holy Fuck, July Talk, Stars, Hadouken!, Sebastien Grainger, Kate Nash, The Stills, Band of Skulls, Codeine Velvet Club, Bear in Heaven, Passion Pit, Nick Zinner (from Yeah Yeah Yeahs), and Chew Lips.

To kick off their tour (and as a treat to fans), on September 24, 2015, Metric played Danforth Music Hall in Toronto.

In support of Pagans in Vegas, the band announced a series of tours in late 2015 and early 2016. In order, they were: Pagans Across The Pond (UK and Europe; Fall 2015), The Topaz Tour (Mexico, Southern USA; Winter 2015), I Can See The End Tour (USA; Winter/Spring 2016), and Lights On The Horizon Tour (Canada; Spring 2016). Death Cab for Cutie and Leisure Cruise opened for the Lights On The Horizon portion of the 2016 tour. One dollar for every ticket sold for the 2016 tour went to help fight climate change and secure environmental rights, working with the David Suzuki Foundation and Plus One.

Throughout the summer of 2016, Metric played several North American festivals, including WayHome Music & Arts Festival in Oro, Ontario, Canada.

Metric performed at the Stanley Cup 125th Anniversary Tribute Concert in Ottawa, Ontario on March 17, 2017.

Metric served as the opening act for the North American dates of The Smashing Pumpkins' "Shiny and Oh So Bright" reunion tour, which ran from July through September 2018.

On September 6, 2018, Metric, Dizzy and The Elwins played at Danforth Music Hall in Toronto to help their hometown's Indie 88 radio station celebrate their fifth birthday.

Metric toured Europe and the United States during fall 2018 and winter 2019 in promotion of Art of Doubt.

From August to December 2022, Metric toured Canada and the United States in promotion of Formentera, with the European leg of the tour (supported by Lo Moon) leading them to Ireland, the United Kingdom, France, Germany and the Netherlands in January and February 2023.

During 2023, they played at various Canadian music festivals, such as Area 506 festival and Churchill Park Music Festival.

Metric were due to embark on a US tour co-headlining with Bloc Party during May and June 2025. On 11 April, Haines released a statement to say they had pulled out of the tour, citing "sudden production decisions" made by Bloc Party's management. At the same time, it was announced that Metric would be performing several headline shows in Canada during the month of June, supported by the Sam Roberts Band. During the shows, they performed their album Fantasies in its entirety.

== Band members ==
Current

- Emily Haines – lead vocals, keyboards, synthesizer, auxiliary percussion, occasional guitar (1998–present)
- James Shaw – guitar, keyboards, backing and occasional lead vocals (1998–present)
- Joules Scott-Key – drums, percussion (2000–present)
- Joshua Winstead – bass guitar, keyboards, backing vocals (2002–present)

Former

- Jarrett Mason – bass guitar (2000–2002)

Timeline

== Discography ==
Studio albums

- Old World Underground, Where Are You Now? (2003)
- Live It Out (2005)
- Grow Up and Blow Away (2007)
- Fantasies (2009)
- Synthetica (2012)
- Pagans in Vegas (2015)
- Art of Doubt (2018)
- Formentera (2022)
- Formentera II (2023)
- Romanticize the Dive (2026)

== Awards and nominations ==
List of awards and nominations for Metric
Year	Organisation	Award	Work or author awarded	Result
2006	Juno Awards	Alternative Album of the Year	Live It Out	Nominated
2006	Polaris Music Prize	Canadian Album of the Year	Live It Out	Nominated
2006	MuchMusic Video Awards	Best Independent Video	"Poster of a Girl"	Nominated
2009	Polaris Music Prize	Canadian Album of the Year	Fantasies	Nominated
2009	CASBY Awards	Favourite New Album	Fantasies	Winner
2009	CASBY Awards	NXNE Favourite New Indie Release	Fantasies	Winner
2009	MuchMusic Video Awards	Best Independent Video	"Gimme Sympathy"	Nominated
2010	Juno Awards	Group of the Year	Metric	Winner
2010	Juno Awards	Songwriter of the Year	Emily Haines and James Shaw; For "Gimme Sympathy", "Sick Muse", "Help I'm Alive" from Fantasies	Nominated
2010	Juno Awards	Alternative Album of the Year	Fantasies	Winner
2010	Satellite Awards	Best Original Song	"Eclipse (All Yours)"	Nominated
2010	MuchMusic Video Awards	Best Independent Video	"Gold Guns Girls"	Nominated
2010	Indies	Favourite Album	Fantasies	Winner
2010	Indies	Favourite Single	"Gimme Sympathy"	Nominated
2010	Indies	Favourite Group/Duo	Metric	Nominated
2010	Indies	Favourite Live Artist/Group	Metric	Nominated
2010	Canadian Radio Music Awards	Best Rock Group Song	"Help I'm Alive"	Winner
2011	MuchMusic Video Awards	Rock Video of the Year	"Stadium Love"	Nominated
2011	MuchMusic Video Awards	Independent Video of the Year	"Stadium Love"	Nominated
2011	Indies	Live Artist/Group of the Year	Metric	Winner
2012	CASBY Awards	NXNE Favourite New Indie Release	Synthetica	Winner
2012	CASBY Awards	Favourite Edge Session	Metric	Winner
2013	Juno Awards	Group of the Year	Metric	Nominated
2013	Juno Awards	Fan Choice	Metric	Nominated
2013	Juno Awards	Producer of the Year	James Shaw; For "Youth Without Youth" and "Breathing Underwater" from Synthetica	Winner
2013	Juno Awards	Alternative Album of the Year	Synthetica	Winner
2013	Juno Awards	Recording Package of the Year	Synthetica; Justin Broadbent (art director/designer/photographer)	Winner
2013	Polaris Music Prize	Canadian Album of the Year	Synthetica	Nominated
2013	MuchMusic Video Awards	Rock/Alternative Video of the Year	"Youth Without Youth"	Nominated
2013	MuchMusic Video Awards	Video of the Year	"Youth Without Youth"	Nominated
2013	Indies	Album of the Year	Synthetica	Nominated
2013	Indies	Single of the Year	"Youth Without Youth"	Nominated
2013	Indies	Group of the Year	Metric	Winner
2013	Indies	Live Artist/Group of the Year	Metric	Nominated
2013	Indies	Video of the Year	"Youth Without Youth"	Nominated
2013	Indies	Must Follow Artist of the Year	Metric	Nominated
2013	Indies	Best-Selling Independent Release of the Year	"Synthetica"	Winner
2014	Canadian Radio Music Awards	Group/Solo Artist:Mainstream AC Song	"Breathing Underwater"	Nominated
2014	Canadian Radio Music Awards	Group/Solo Artist:CHR Song	"Breathing Underwater"	Nominated
2016	Juno Awards	Group of the Year	Metric	Nominated
2016	MuchMusic Video Awards	Rock/Alternative Video of the Year	"The Shade"	Nominated
2016	Indies	Group of the Year	Metric	Nominated
2019	Juno Awards	Group of the Year	Metric	Nominated
2023	Juno Awards	Group of the Year	Metric	Nominated
2024	Juno Awards	Rock Album of the Year	Formentera II	Nominated
2024	Indies	Fan Choice	Metric	Nominated
2024	Indies	Album of the Year	Formentera II	Nominated

== Use in media ==
List of Metric songs featured on various productions
Song	Where	Type
"Grow Up and Blow Away"	Polaroid i-Zone Fortune Film commercial	ad
"Combat Baby"	playable song in Rock Band 3	video game
"Dead Disco"	Clean	film
"Dead Disco"	Grey's Anatomy (Season 7 episode "Something's Gotta Give")	TV series
"Monster Hospital"	CSI: Miami	TV series
"Monster Hospital"	Grey's Anatomy	TV series
"Monster Hospital"	Hollyoaks	TV series
"Monster Hospital"	Tormented	film
"Monster Hospital"	Now Is Good	film
"Monster Hospital" (MSTRKRFT remix)	PlayStation Meeting 2013 for presentation of PlayStation 4	presentation
"Poster of a Girl"	Hollyoaks	TV series
"Handshakes"	Inside Paris	film
"Handshakes"	Test Drive Unlimited.	video game
"Handshakes"	Hollyoaks	TV series
"Help I'm Alive"	90210	TV series
"Help I'm Alive"	The Vampire Diaries	TV series
"Help I'm Alive"	Grey's Anatomy	TV series
"Help I'm Alive"	Dying Light 2: Stay Human	video game
"Help I'm Alive"	Defendor	film
"Help I'm Alive"	Zombieland	film
"Help I'm Alive"	We Bury the Dead	film
"Help I'm Alive"	Miss Representation	film
"Help I'm Alive"	Pretty Hard Cases	TV series
NBA 2K10	video game	
"Gimme Sympathy"	90210	TV series
"Gimme Sympathy"	the opening montage to CBC's coverage of the 2010 NHL Winter Classic	opening montage
"Gimme Sympathy"	the Slate credit card commercials for Chase Bank	ad
"Gimme Sympathy"	the Ontario Media Development Corporation's 2011 "We've Got it Going On" campaign	ad
"Sick Muse"	The Vampire Diaries (in the season 3 finale, "The Departed")	TV series
"Gold Guns Girls"	90210	TV series
"Gold Guns Girls"	Zombieland	Film
"Gold Guns Girls"	Entourage	TV series
"Gold Guns Girls"	Grey's Anatomy	TV series
"Gold Guns Girls"	Rookie Blue	TV series
"Gold Guns Girls"	One Tree Hill	TV series
"Gold Guns Girls"	FIFA 10	video game
"Gold Guns Girls"	APB Reloaded	video game
"Gold Guns Girls"	Test Drive Unlimited 2	video game
"Gold Guns Girls"	Miss Representation	film
"Gold Guns Girls"	Totally Spies! The Movie	film
"Gold Guns Girls"	Nimona (film)	film
"Gold Guns Girls" (Acoustic)	Nikita (in the season 3 Episode 3, "True Believer")	TV series
"Stadium Love"	CSI: NY	TV series
"Stadium Love"	House	TV series
"Stadium Love"	the theme of the Toronto Blue Jays for the 2013 Season	theme song
"Stadium Love"	2011 NHL All-Star Game	event
"Stadium Love"	Shaun White Skateboarding	video game
"Police and the Private"	Grey's Anatomy	TV series
"Front Row"	Grey's Anatomy	TV series
"Blindness"	Grey's Anatomy	TV series
"Synthetica"	Grey's Anatomy	TV series
"Eclipse (All Yours)"	The Twilight Saga: Eclipse soundtrack	film soundtrack
"Black Sheep"	Scott Pilgrim vs. The World	film/soundtrack
"Speed the Collapse"	FIFA 13	video game
"Youth Without Youth"	White Collar Season 5 trailer	TV series
"The Shade"	CTV Fall 2015 Season Promo spot	Ad

== See also ==
- Music of Canada
