= Formentera II =

Studio album by Metric
- Released: October 13, 2023
- Genres: Indie rock; synth-pop; dream pop
- Length: 39:58
- Labels: Metric Music International; Thirty Tigers
- Producers: Liam O'Neil; Jimmy Shaw; Gus van Go

Metric chronology
Formentera (2022)	Formentera II (2023)	Romanticize the Dive (2026)

Singles from Formentera II
- 1. "Just the Once" Released: 07 July 2023; 2. "Nothing Is Perfect" Released: 11 August 2023; 3. "Who Would You Be For Me" Released: 08 September 2023

Formentera II is the ninth studio album by Canadian indie rock band Metric. It was released on October 13, 2023, through the band's own label – Metric Music International – and distribution was handled by Thirty Tigers. It is the sequel to the band's previous album, Formentera (2022).

== Background ==
Metric initially began work on Formentera II during the onset of the COVID-19 pandemic before completing the album in early 2023. Recording sessions were held at the band's Main Street Studios in Toronto and Motorbass Studios in Paris.

== Singles ==
The album's lead single, "Just the Once", was released simultaneously with the album's announcement on July 7, 2023.

== Critical reception ==
Professional ratings
Aggregate scores
Source	Rating
Metacritic	79/100
Review scores
Source	Rating
The Line of Best Fit	8/10
MusicOMH	4/5 stars

Formentera II was met with "generally favorable" reviews from critics. At Metacritic, which assigns a weighted average rating out of 100 to reviews from mainstream publications, this release received an average score of 79, based on 4 reviews.

== Track listing ==
All tracks are written by Emily Haines and James Shaw.

Formentera II track listing
No.	Title	Length
1.	"Detour Up"	3:38
2.	"Just the Once"	3:24
3.	"Stone Window"	4:00
4.	"Days of Oblivion"	5:59
5.	"Who Would You Be for Me"	5:01
6.	"Suckers"	4:29
7.	"Nothing Is Perfect"	3:30
8.	"Descendants"	5:54
9.	"Go Ahead and Cry"	4:03
Total length:		39:58

== Personnel ==
- Jimmy Shaw – production, engineering
- Gus van Go – production, engineering
- Liam O'Neil – production, engineering
- Colin Leonard – mastering
- Stuart White – mixing
- Matheus Braz – mixing assistance
- Justin Broadbent – artwork, design

== Charts ==
Chart performance for Formentera II
Chart (2023)	Peak position
Australian Digital Albums (ARIA)	46
Canadian Albums (Billboard)	82
UK Album Downloads (Official Charts)	66
UK Independent Albums (Official Charts)	23
