= Synthetica =

Studio album by Metric
- Released: 12 June 2012
- Recorded: Giant Studios, Toronto; Electric Lady Studios, New York City
- Genres: Indie rock, new wave
- Length: 43:11
- Labels: Metric Music International, Mom + Pop
- Producers: Gavin Brown; John O'Mahony; Liam O'Neil; Jimmy Shaw

Metric chronology
Fantasies (2009)	Synthetica (2012)	Pagans in Vegas (2015)

Singles from Metric
- 1. "Youth Without Youth" Released: 1 May 2012; 2. "Breathing Underwater" Released: 29 May 2012; 3. "Synthetica" Released: 2013; 4. "Lost Kitten" Released: 2013

Synthetica is the fifth album by the Canadian indie rock band Metric, released on 12 June 2012. The first single, "Youth Without Youth", was released on 1 May 2012. "Speed the Collapse" was released as a sneak preview on 23 May 2012.

On 30 May 2012 the album was available for streaming by playing "Synthetica Hide + Seek"; this was done through an interactive word hunting game on the band's website. A deluxe version, with five additional tracks, was released on 20 November 2012.

The song "Speed the Collapse" is featured on the soundtrack for the video game by EA Sports, FIFA 13 and in the 2013 Grey's Anatomy episode "Things We Said Today" (season 9, episode 10). The song "Breathing Underwater" is featured in the 2013 The Vampire Diaries episode "Original Sin" (season 5, episode 3).

The band also put out a companion app of the same name, which allowed fans to remix the songs off of the album.

== History ==
According to Metric's frontwoman Emily Haines, Synthetica is "about forcing yourself to confront what you see in the mirror when you finally stand still long enough to catch a reflection. Synthetica is about being able to identify the original in a long line of reproductions. It's about what is real vs what is artificial". The band collaborated with Lou Reed for the recording of the song "The Wanderlust"; the song would ultimately be his very last appearance on an original recording during his lifetime. A unique feature of the album is that all of the lyrics in the booklet are printed backwards. Included in the CD case is a reflective piece of foil so the words can be read correctly.

Following the album's release, Haines responded to a question about the changing meaning of songs over time and stated in relation to a lyric from the title song "Synthetica": "Like, 'Hey, I'm not synthetica'—sometimes it feels like a totally victorious statement and sometimes it feels kind of beaten down … but it's just rock 'n' roll, you know. I'm not meaning to be pretentious about it at all."

== Mobile app ==
The band released a mobile app created specifically for the Synthetica album. An interview with lead singer Emily Haines revealed that the app gave the band the opportunity to revisit an artwork: "The whole point of it is that it's an experience between us and the listener and people can be more involved. I'm really excited that we can just constantly upgrade it". The songs in the app are paired with artworks from Italian architecture group Superstudio, on which Haines commented: "I'm always looking for art, looking for things to be inspired by and connect with", says Haines about what prompted the decision to include the images in the app. "I just found myself drawn into this world of those drawings that are abstractions of future realities, but in this case they took the conventional model of those kinds of conceptual drawings and really made a movement".

== Reception ==
=== Critical response ===
Professional ratings
Aggregate scores
Source	Rating
AnyDecentMusic?	6.8/10
Metacritic	71/100
Review scores
Source	Rating
AllMusic	4/5 stars
The A.V. Club	B
The Daily Telegraph	5/5 stars
The Guardian	3/5 stars
The Independent	3/5 stars
Los Angeles Times	3/4 stars
NME	7/10
Pitchfork	7.0/10
Rolling Stone	3.5/5 stars
Spin	8/10

Synthetica received generally positive reviews from music critics. At Metacritic, which assigns a normalized rating out of 100 to reviews from mainstream critics, the album received an average score of 71, based on 29 reviews, which indicates "generally favorable reviews".

Synthetica ranked at number 13 on Spinner's The 50 Best Albums of 2012. The album also featured on Spin's Top 50 Albums of 2012 at the number 47.

On 13 June 2013 the album was named a longlisted nominee for the 2013 Polaris Music Prize.

=== Commercial performance ===
Synthetica debuted at number two on the Canadian Albums Chart, selling 16,000 copies. In the United States, the album debuted at number twelve on the Billboard 200, selling 27,000 copies in its first week. As of August 2015, it has sold 135,000 copies in the United States.

== Track listing ==
All songs written and composed by Metric.

No.	Title	Length
1.	"Artificial Nocturne"	5:42
2.	"Youth Without Youth"	4:17
3.	"Speed the Collapse"	3:42
4.	"Breathing Underwater"	3:56
5.	"Dreams So Real"	2:40
6.	"Lost Kitten"	3:16
7.	"The Void"	3:17
8.	"Synthetica"	3:54
9.	"Clone"	5:13
10.	"The Wanderlust" (featuring Lou Reed)	3:10
11.	"Nothing But Time"	4:04

iTunes pre-order bonus tracks
No.	Title	Length
12.	"Reflection #1"	1:36
13.	"Reflection #4"	2:54
14.	"Reflection #6"	1:56
15.	"Reflection #9"	1:28
16.	"Reflection #11"	5:30

Deluxe version additional tracks
No.	Title	Length
12.	"Youth Without Youth" (acoustic)	3:55
13.	"Breathing Underwater" (acoustic)	4:37
14.	"Synthetica" (acoustic)	2:57
15.	"Gimme Sympathy" (acoustic)	3:09
16.	"Strange Weather" (acoustic) (written by Tom Waits/Kathleen Brennan, originally recorded by Marianne Faithfull)	3:16

== Personnel ==
Credits adapted from Synthetica album liner notes.

Metric

- Emily Haines – vocals, synthesizer, guitar
- Joules Scott-Key – drums
- James Shaw – guitar, producer
- Josh Winstead – bass

Additional personnel

- Justin Broadbent – design, photography
- Gavin Brown – co-producer
- Greg Calbi – mastering
- Evan Cranley – additional horns (3, 8)
- Bryant Latourette – mountain photography
- John O'Mahony – co-producer, mixing
- Liam O'Neil – co-producer, engineer
- Lou Reed – vocals (10)
- Lenny de Rose – engineer
- Chris Seligman – additional horns (3, 8)

== Charts ==
Chart (2012)	Peak position
Australian Albums Chart	21
Belgian Albums Chart (Flanders)	132
Belgian Albums Chart (Wallonia)	113
Canadian Albums Chart	2
French Albums Chart	91
German Albums Chart	78
Irish Albums Chart	48
Irish Independent Albums Chart	5
Swiss Albums Chart	59
UK Albums Chart	51
UK Indie Albums Chart	7
US Billboard 200	12
US Billboard Top Modern Rock/Alternative Albums	1
US Independent Albums	2
US Billboard Top Rock Albums	6

== Certifications ==
Region	Certification	Certified units/sales
Canada (Music Canada)	Platinum	80,000^{‡}
^{‡} Sales+streaming figures based on certification alone.
