= Art of Doubt =

Studio album by Metric
- Released: 21 September 2018
- Recorded: Giant Studios (Toronto)
- Genres: Indie rock; new wave; synth-pop
- Length: 58:16
- Labels: Metric Music International; BMG
- Producer: Justin Meldal-Johnsen

Metric chronology
Pagans in Vegas (2015)	Art of Doubt (2018)	Formentera (2022)

Singles from Art of Doubt
- 1. "Dark Saturday" Released: 13 July 2018; 2. "Dressed to Suppress" Released: 26 July 2018; 3. "Now or Never Now" Released: 4 September 2018; 4. "Love You Back" Released: 4 February 2019; 5. "Risk" Released: 24 April 2019

Art of Doubt is the seventh album by the Canadian indie rock band Metric, which was released on 21 September 2018. The first single, "Dark Saturday", was released on 13 July 2018, followed by "Dressed to Suppress" on 26 July, and "Now or Never Now" on 4 September. On 13 September NPR published a live stream of the album.

== Background ==
Art of Doubt was produced by Justin Meldal-Johnsen; it was recorded at EastWest Studios in Los Angeles, and at Metric's studio, Giant Studio, in Toronto. The album design and cover are designed by longtime Metric collaborator Justin Broadbent.

== Critical response ==
Professional ratings
Aggregate scores
Source	Rating
Metacritic	73/100
Review scores
Source	Rating
AllMusic	4/5 stars
The A.V. Club	B−
Consequence of Sound	C+
Exclaim!	8/10
NME	4/5 stars
NOW Magazine	4/5 stars
Pitchfork	6.6/10
PopMatters	7/10 stars
Under The Radar	7/10 stars

Art of Doubt received generally positive reviews from music critics. At Metacritic, which assigns a normalized rating out of 100 to reviews from mainstream critics, the album received an average score of 73, based on 11 reviews, which indicates "generally favorable reviews".

== Track listing ==
All tracks are written by Metric.

No.	Title	Length
1.	"Dark Saturday"	3:50
2.	"Love You Back"	4:07
3.	"Die Happy"	4:05
4.	"Now or Never Now"	6:19
5.	"Art of Doubt"	4:50
6.	"Underline the Black"	4:35
7.	"Dressed to Suppress"	5:42
8.	"Risk"	5:24
9.	"Seven Rules"	5:08
10.	"Holding Out"	3:57
11.	"Anticipate"	3:45
12.	"No Lights on the Horizon"	6:34
Total length:		58:16

== Charts ==
Chart (2018)	Peak position
Canadian Albums (Billboard)	6
Scottish Albums (Official Charts)	61
US Billboard 200	95
