= Pagans in Vegas =

Studio album by Metric
- Released: 18 September 2015
- Genre: Indie rock, new wave
- Length: 49:22
- Label: Metric Music International, Universal Music Group

Metric chronology
| Synthetica (2012) | Pagans in Vegas (2015) | Art of Doubt (2018) |

Singles from Pagans in Vegas
- 1. "The Shade" Released: 11 May 2015; 2. "Cascades" Released: 2 June 2015; 3. "Too Bad, So Sad" Released: 17 July 2015; 4. "Fortunes" Released: 7 August 2015; 5. "The Governess" Released: 11 September 2015

Pagans in Vegas is the sixth studio album by Canadian indie rock band Metric, which was released on 18 September 2015. The first single, "The Shade", was released on 11 May 2015. "Cascades" was released as the second single of the album on 2 June 2015. On 7 July 2015, the band released "Too Bad, So Sad" as the third single via a new iOS and Android app it created called "Pagan Portal"; the app allows fans to listen to tracks off the album, as they're released and read newsletters from the band.

== Critical response ==
Professional ratings
Aggregate scores
| Source | Rating |
|---|---|
| Metacritic | 65/100 |
Review scores
| Source | Rating |
| AllMusic | 3.5/5 stars |
| The A.V. Club | B+ |
| Consequence of Sound | C |
| Exclaim! | 8/10 |
| Now | 3/5 stars |
| Pitchfork | 6.0/10 |
| Rolling Stone | 3/5 stars |
| Under The Radar | 4.5/10 stars |

Pagans in Vegas received generally positive reviews from music critics. At Metacritic, which assigns a normalized rating out of 100 to reviews from mainstream critics, the album received an average score of 65, based on 15 reviews, which indicates "generally favorable reviews".

== Track listing ==
| No. | Title | Length |
|---|---|---|
| 1. | "Lie Lie Lie" | 4:25 |
| 2. | "Fortunes" | 4:12 |
| 3. | "The Shade" | 3:36 |
| 4. | "Celebrate" | 4:00 |
| 5. | "Cascades" | 5:24 |
| 6. | "For Kicks" | 4:36 |
| 7. | "Too Bad, So Sad" | 3:24 |
| 8. | "Other Side" | 3:51 |
| 9. | "Blind Valentine" | 3:22 |
| 10. | "The Governess" | 4:01 |
| 11. | "The Face, Part I" | 5:01 |
| 12. | "The Face, Part II" | 3:20 |

iTunes pre-order bonus track
| No. | Title | Length |
|---|---|---|
| 13. | "Office Towers Escalate" | 3:16 |

Metric Store pre-order download bonus tracks
| No. | Title | Length |
|---|---|---|
| 13. | "Office Towers Escalate" | 3:16 |
| 14. | "The Shade" (acoustic) | 3:12 |

== Charts ==
| Chart (2015) | Peak position |
|---|---|
| Australian Albums (ARIA) | 87 |
| Canadian Albums (Billboard) | 5 |
| US Billboard 200 | 36 |
| US Digital Albums (Billboard) | 14 |
| US Independent Albums (Billboard) | 9 |
| US Top Rock Albums (Billboard) | 13 |
