= Formentera (album) =

Studio album by Metric
- Released: July 8, 2022
- Genre: Indie rock; synth-pop; dream pop
- Length: 47:39
- Label: Metric Music International; Thirty Tigers
- Producer: Gus van Go, James Shaw

Metric chronology
Art of Doubt (2018)	Formentera (2022)	Formentera II (2023)

Singles from Formentera
- 1. "All Comes Crashing" Released: 28 April 2022; 2. "Doomscroller" Released: 18 May 2022; 3. "What Feels Like Eternity" Released: 8 June 2022; 4. "False Dichotomy" Released: 8 July 2022

Formentera is the eighth studio album by Metric. It was released on July 8, 2022, through Metric Music International and Thirty Tigers. The album was supported by the singles "All Comes Crashing", "Doomscroller", "What Feels Like Eternity", and "False Dichotomy".

== Critical reception ==
Professional ratings
Aggregate scores
Source	Rating
Metacritic	79/100
Review scores
Source	Rating
AllMusic	4.5/5 stars
Clash	6/10
The Daily Telegraph	4/5 stars
DIY	4/5 stars
Exclaim!	8/10
NME	4/5 stars
Pitchfork	7.0/10
Record Collector	3/5 stars
Uncut	6/10

Formentera received a score of 79 out of 100 based on ten critics' reviews, on review aggregator Metacritic, indicating "generally favorable" reception.

== Track listing ==
Formentera track listing
No.	Title	Length
1.	"Doomscroller"	10:28
2.	"All Comes Crashing"	4:23
3.	"What Feels Like Eternity"	3:37
4.	"Formentera"	6:17
5.	"Enemies of the Ocean"	5:13
6.	"I Will Never Settle"	5:00
7.	"False Dichotomy"	3:39
8.	"Oh Please"	4:12
9.	"Paths in the Sky"	4:50
Total length:		47:39

== Charts ==
Chart performance for Formentera
Chart (2022)	Peak position
Australian Digital Albums (ARIA)	35
Canadian Albums (Billboard)	38
Scottish Albums (OCC)	61
UK Album Downloads (OCC)	22
UK Independent Albums (OCC)	11
US Top Album Sales (Billboard)	26
