= Joshua Winstead =

American songwriter and musician

- Born: Joshua Winstead; Pittsburgh, Pennsylvania
- Genres: Indie rock; new wave
- Occupations: Singer; songwriter; guitarist
- Instruments: Vocals; bass guitar
- Years active: 1990–present
- Labels: MMI; Royal Cut Records
- Member of: Metric
- Formerly of: The Death of Death; Bang Lime
- Spouse: Sarada Winstead

Joshua Winstead is an American songwriter and musician. He is the bassist and synth player of the Canadian indie rock band Metric. On June 3, 2016, he released his debut solo album MMXX on his own label Royal Cut Records.

== Life and career ==
Winstead was born in Pittsburgh, Pennsylvania, and grew up in El Paso, Texas, where he first began playing guitar. Winstead and Joules Scott-Key (drummer for Metric and Bang Lime) both went to the University of North Texas, where they played in a number of bands together starting in 1991. One of these bands was 53 Large Men, who released an album titled Period of Senselessness. The two moved to New York City together, where they played in another band called The Death of Death.

Scott-Key was soon invited to join Metric, and Winstead subsequently joined. This was Winstead's first bass playing experience, but since he had been playing with Scott-Key for so many years they quickly became a very tight rhythm section.

Having written a lot of 1960s-driven music, Winstead teamed up with Scott-Key to form the Oakland-based band Bang Lime. Bang Lime's debut album, released in 2007, is titled Best Friends in Love, and is said to possess elements of indie rock, dance-rock, post-punk, and "dirty" rock & roll. The first single/video of the album is titled "The Death Of Death," an homage to their short-lived former band. On June 3, 2016, he released his debut solo album MMXX on his own label Royal Cut Records.
