= James Shaw (musician) =

Canadian musician

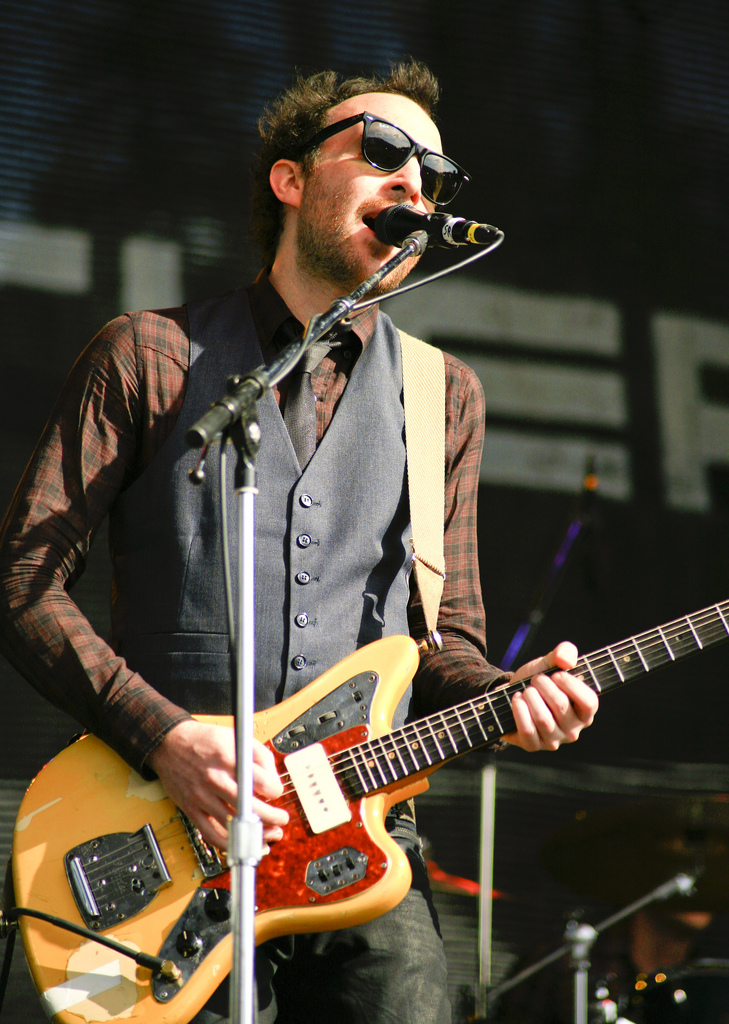
- In Victoria B.C., November 2012

Background information
- Also known as: Jimmy Shaw
- Genres: Indie rock; alternative rock; new wave; post-punk revival; synth-pop; dance-rock
- Occupations: Musician; record producer; recording engineer
- Instruments: Guitar; synthesizer; theremin
- Years active: 1997–present
- Labels: Metric Music International; Last Gang; Arts & Crafts (Mexico only)

James Shaw (sometimes credited as Jimmy Shaw) is a founder and lead guitarist of Canadian indie rock band Metric. He is also a member of the band Broken Social Scene and a producer.

== Life and career ==
Shaw was born in London, England, and raised in Bellevue, Ontario, Canada. He spent three years earning a classical music education at the Juilliard Music School in New York. Upon returning to Toronto, Ontario, Canada, he met Emily Haines, and the two began dating and making music immediately. In 1997, Haines was featured in Shaw's debut album Life on the Clock, and the two formed the band Metric in 1998. Shaw's early efforts to make sure that Haines remained friends with her former high school friend Kevin Drew helped the evolution of Broken Social Scene.

Shaw produced the debut album of the Montreal band The Lovely Feathers (who toured with Metric in 2005).

He was the owner of Giant Studios in Toronto from 2006, formerly with Sebastien Grainger, member of Death from Above 1979, until he sold it to Gus Van Go, a producer known for his work with Metric and the Stills in 2023.

In 2010, he was nominated along with bandmate Emily Haines for the Juno Award for Songwriter of the Year. In 2013, he won the Juno Award for Producer of the Year for the songs "Youth Without Youth" and "Breathing Underwater" from Metric's album Synthetica.

In 2015, he released the album Pagans in Vegas with Metric. On March 30, 2017, he appeared with Broken Social Scene on The Late Show with Stephen Colbert, and on July 7, he released the album Hug of Thunder with them. Also in 2017, he co-produced the album Late Show by The Beaches alongside Haines. He subsequently released several more albums with Metric: Art of Doubt in 2018, Formentera in 2022, Formentera II a year later, and Romanticize the Dive in 2026.

Shaw performed with Broken Social Scene on The Late Show with Stephen Colbert March 30, 2017.
