= Remember the Humans =

Studio album by Broken Social Scene
- Released: May 8, 2026
- Studio: Dobbtown North; The Bathouse; Lost Tin Rooster; Levels
- Length: 49:43
- Label: Arts & Crafts
- Producer: David Newfeld

Broken Social Scene chronology
Hug of Thunder (2017)	Remember the Humans (2026)

Singles from Remember the Humans
- 1. "Not Around Anymore" Released: February 3, 2026; 2. "Hey Amanda" Released: March 12, 2026; 3. "The Call" Released: April 16, 2026

Remember the Humans is the sixth studio album by the Canadian indie rock band Broken Social Scene, released on May 8, 2026, on Arts & Crafts Records. Produced by David Newfeld, who had previously worked with the band on You Forgot It in People (2002) and Broken Social Scene (2005), it is the band's first full-length studio album in nine years, following Hug of Thunder (2017).

== Critical reception ==
Professional ratings
Aggregate scores
Source	Rating
AnyDecentMusic?	7.4/10
Metacritic	81/100
Review scores
Source	Rating
The Line of Best Fit	7/10
Mojo	4/5 stars
MusicOMH	4/5 stars
Paste	B+
Pitchfork	8.0/10
PopMatters	8/10
Record Collector	4/5 stars
Uncut	7/10
Under the Radar	8.5/10 stars

On Metacritic, which assigns a normalised rating out of 100 to reviews from mainstream critics, the album received an average score of 81, based on ten reviews.

Nina Corcoran of Pitchfork gave the album an 8.0/10, calling it "quintessential Broken Social Scene". Reviewing the album in Record Collector, Kevin Harley gave it 4 out of 5 stars, praising the vocal performances and the album's "balance of reflection and celebration". Paste's Ryan Reed says "It feels absolutely enormous, even when hardly anything is happening."

== Track listing ==
Remember the Humans track listing
No.	Title	Writer(s)	Length
1.	"Not Around Anymore"	Kevin Drew	3:52
2.	"Only the Good I Keep"	Hannah Georgas	3:27
3.	"Mission Accomplished (Kingfisher)"	Drew	3:13
4.	"The Call"	Andrew Whiteman	4:13
5.	"Relief"	Lisa Lobsinger	3:28
6.	"And I Think of You"	Drew	5:52
7.	"This Briefest Kiss"	Ariel Engle; Whiteman	6:01
8.	"Life Within the Ground"	Drew	4:23
9.	"Hey Amanda"	Drew	3:30
10.	"Paying for Your Love"	Drew	3:28
11.	"What Happens Now"	Leslie Feist	5:28
12.	"Parking Lot Dreams"	Drew	2:48
Total length:			49:43

== Personnel ==
Credits are adapted from the album's liner notes.

=== Broken Social Scene ===
- Kevin Drew – vocals (tracks 1, 3, 6, 8–10), synthesizers (1, 3, 6), drum programming (1, 6), bass synthesizer (1), backup vocals (2, 5), piano (2, 8, 9), acoustic guitar (3, 5, 6, 11, 12), electric guitar (3, 7, 9, 10), vocal glitch (4), floor tom (5), keyboard (8, 11), string pad (9), acoustic guitar (10), bass pulse (11), executive production
- Charles Spearin – recording, associate production (all tracks); bass (1, 2, 5, 6, 8, 11, 12), synth bass (2), electric guitar (3, 6), synthesizer (4, 5, 11), trumpet (4, 11), Nashville guitar (5, 10), slide affected guitar (7), background vocals (8), vocals (9); guitar, strings (11), executive production
- Justin Peroff – drums (1–5, 7, 8–11), artwork
- Evan Cranley – trombone (1–3, 6, 8–11), percussion (1), conga (6), dutar (9), sound effects (11)
- Sam Goldberg – sonic flutter (1), electric guitar (2), electric piano (3), bass (7, 9, 10), guitar (8)
- Andrew Whiteman – backup vocals (1), tres (3, 4), electric guitar (3); vocals, Organelle (4); guitar (5, 7, 11), synthesizers (6, 7, 11), nylon guitar (8)
- Jill Harris – backup vocals (1), vocals (3, 4, 8, 9)
- Brendan Canning – backup vocals (2, 5, 9), acoustic guitar (2, 9, 11), electric guitar (2), bass (3, 5), synthesizer (5), piano (6, 7, 9), Hammond B3 organ (7), guitar (9), lead electric guitar (10), vocals (12)
- Hannah Georgas – vocals, synthesizer (2); additional backup vocals (6)
- David French – saxophone (3, 4, 6, 9–11)
- Lisa Lobsinger – vocals, synthesizers, synth bass, drum programming (5)
- Amy Millan – vocals (6)
- Ariel Engle – vocals (7)
- James Shaw – guitar drone, trumpet (11)
- Leslie Feist – vocals, guitar (11)

=== Additional contributors ===
- David Newfeld – production, mixing, recording (all tracks); rhythm guitar (2); bass guitar, electric guitar, drum machine (4); guitar (5, 6, 10), additional drum machine (5), synthesizers (6, 7, 10), synth orchestra (9), mandolin (10)
- Rachel McLean – percussion (1, 4), shaker (3), hand claps (4), vocals (9, 12), sleigh bells (9)
- Dan Bone – flute, saxophone (1, 5–7); clarinet (6, 7)
- Daniel Ledwell – flugelhorn (1, 10)
- Ohad Benchetrit – strings (2), electric guitar (12)
- Emily Lazar – mastering
- Bob DeMaa – mastering assistance
- Robbie Lackritz – Feist vocal recording
- Jordan D. Allen – handwritten titles
- Jonny Desilva – layout
