= National Anthem of Nowhere =

Studio album by Apostle of Hustle
- Released: February 6, 2007
- Recorded: Masterkut, Montreal (March 2006); Monocentre (August–September 2006); Andrew's bedroom, Toronto (December 2005 – August 2006)
- Genre: Indie rock
- Length: 47:16
- Label: Arts & Crafts
- Producers: Martin Davis Kinack, Andrew Whiteman

Apostle of Hustle chronology
Folkloric Feel (2004)	National Anthem of Nowhere (2007)	Eats Darkness (2009)

Professional ratings
Aggregate scores
Source	Rating
Metacritic	68/100
Review scores
Source	Rating
AllMusic	3/5 stars
Music Emissions	4/5 stars
Pitchfork	(7.0/10)
Toronto Star	3.5/4 stars

National Anthem of Nowhere is the second album by Canadian indie rock band Apostle of Hustle. It was released in Canada on February 6, 2007.

Andrew Whiteman, the band's frontman and lead guitarist of Broken Social Scene, admires world music, and influences upon this album have included Cuban-style guitars and Spanish lyrics.

"There is a specific story to the album, to me," Whiteman says. "There's a specific geography, which is under the rubric of the dockside. And there is a story. I wouldn't want to tell anyone the story, in case they've written their own. But it involves the supernatural, and various revolutionary statements."

In January 2007, the band launched a contest inviting fans to cover or remix the first track, "My Sword Hand's Anger".

"My Sword Hand's Anger" reached No. 1 on CBC Radio 3's R3-30 chart the week of March 8, 2007.

== Track listing ==
1. "My Sword Hand's Anger" – 3:13
2. "National Anthem of Nowhere" – 5:11
3. "The Naked & Alone" – 4:36
4. "Haul Away" – 3:28
5. "Cheap Like Sebastien" – 3:37
6. "¡Rafaga!" – 3:57
7. "Chances Are" – 3:27
8. "A Rent Boy Goes Down" – 4:07
9. "Fast Pony for Victor Jara" – 3:25
10. "Justine, Beckoning" – 4:55
11. "Jimmy Scott Is the Answer" – 4:02
12. "NoNoNo" – 3:18
