= Darlings (Kevin Drew album) =

Studio album by Kevin Drew
- Released: March 18, 2014
- Genre: Indie rock
- Length: 42:26
- Label: Arts & Crafts
- Producers: Kevin Drew, Dave Hamelin, Graham Lessard

Kevin Drew chronology
| Something for All of Us... (2008) | Darlings (2014) |

Singles from Darlings
- 1. "Good Sex" Released: February 14, 2014; 2. "Mexican Aftershow Party" Released: February 24, 2014

Professional ratings
Aggregate scores
| Source | Rating |
|---|---|
| AnyDecentMusic? | 6.6/10 |
| Metacritic | 67/100 |
Review scores
| Source | Rating |
| AllMusic | 4/5 stars |
| Clash | 5/10 |
| Consequence of Sound | B |
| DIY | 3/5 stars |
| Exclaim! | 7/10 |
| MusicOMH | 4.5/5 stars |
| NME | 3/5 stars |
| Pitchfork | 7.6/10 |
| Rolling Stone | 3/5 stars |
| Under the Radar | 6.5/10 |

Darlings is the second studio album by Broken Social Scene co-founder Kevin Drew. It was released on March 18, 2014 through Arts & Crafts Productions.

The album was recorded at the Banff Centre in Alberta with Graham Lessard and then taken to a house in Northern Ontario with Dave Hamelin for final recording and mixing. The album also features longtime collaborators Charles Spearin and Ohad Benchetrit along with Dean Stone.

== Critical reception ==
Darlings was met with generally favorable reviews from critics. At Metacritic, which assigns a weighted average rating out of 100 to reviews from mainstream publications, this release received an average score of 67, based on 18 reviews.

== Track listing ==
| No. | Title | Length |
|---|---|---|
| 1. | "Body Butter" | 2:25 |
| 2. | "Good Sex" | 3:09 |
| 3. | "It's Cool" | 3:51 |
| 4. | "Mexican Aftershow Party" | 3:27 |
| 5. | "You Gotta Feel It" | 4:03 |
| 6. | "First in Line" | 3:03 |
| 7. | "Bullshit Ballad" | 4:12 |
| 8. | "My God" | 4:45 |
| 9. | "You in Your Were" | 4:00 |
| 10. | "You Got Caught" | 4:07 |
| 11. | "And That's All I Know" | 5:24 |

== Charts ==
Chart performance for Darlings
| Chart (2007) | Peak position |
|---|---|
| US Billboard 200 | 113 |
| US Independent Albums (Billboard) | 45 |
