= Emily Haines =

Canadian singer-songwriter (born 1974)

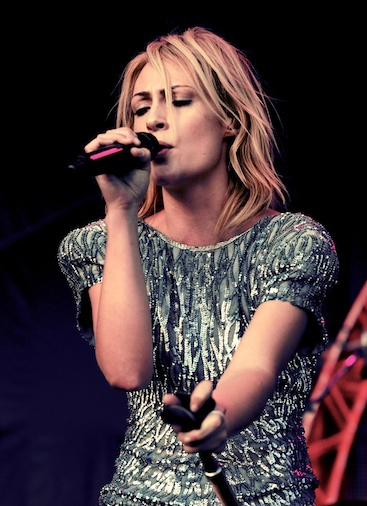
- Haines performing at Ottawa Bluesfest in 2010

Background information
- Born: Emily Savitri Haines; 25 January 1974 (age 52); New Delhi, India
- Origin: Toronto, Ontario, Canada
- Genres: Indie rock; new wave
- Occupations: Singer; songwriter
- Instruments: Vocals; keyboards; guitar; percussion; harmonica
- Years active: 1990–present
- Label: Last Gang
- Member of: Metric; Broken Social Scene; Emily Haines & The Soft Skeleton
- Website: www.emilyhaines.com

Emily Savitri Haines (born 25 January 1974) is a Canadian singer and songwriter. She is the lead singer, keyboardist and songwriter of the rock band Metric and a member of the musical collective Broken Social Scene. As a solo artist, she has performed under her own name and as Emily Haines & The Soft Skeleton. Haines possesses the vocal range of a soprano.

== Early life ==
Born in New Delhi, and raised in Fenelon Falls, Ontario, Haines is a dual citizen of Canada and the United States (her parents were both born in the US). She is the daughter of Canadian poet Paul Haines and activist Jo Hayward-Haines who founded a school for under-privileged children in India. Her middle name, Savitri, is from Savitri: A Legend and a Symbol, an epic poem by Sri Aurobindo. Her sister is the Canadian television journalist Avery Haines and her brother is Tim Haines, owner of Bluestreak Records in Peterborough, Ontario, Canada.

Haines grew up in a house rich with experimental art and musical expression and her early influences included Carla Bley, Robert Wyatt, and PJ Harvey. She studied drama at the Etobicoke School of the Arts (ESA), where she met Amy Millan and Kevin Drew, with whom she would later collaborate in Broken Social Scene (co-founded by Drew). During their time at ESA, Haines and Millan formed their first band together.

Haines attended the University of British Columbia in Vancouver between 1992 and 1993, and Montreal's Concordia University between 1995 and 1996. In 1996, she distributed a limited-edition album entitled Cut in Half and Also Double that included songs written and recorded during her student years.

== Professional music ==
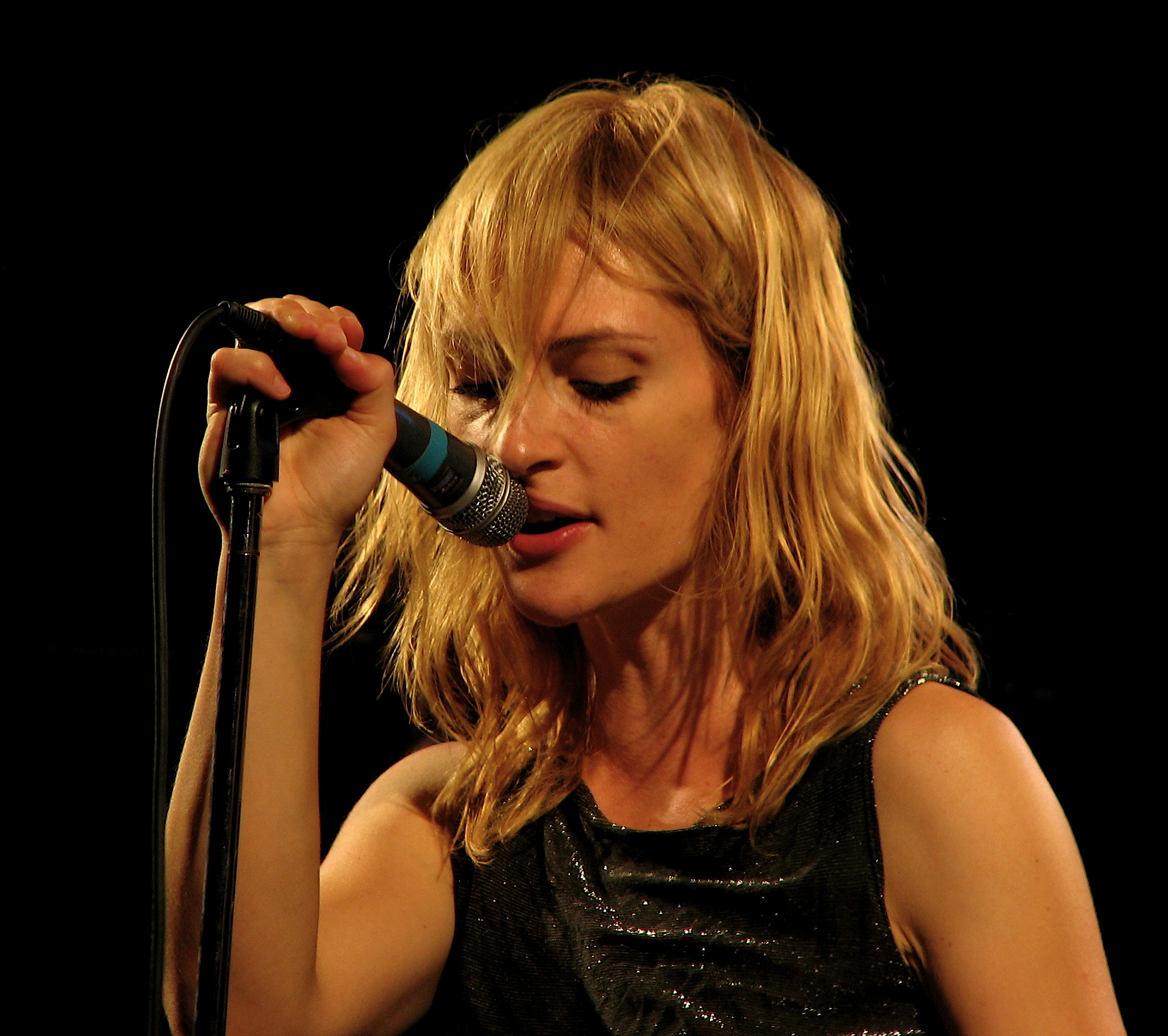
Haines in 2006

Haines met James Shaw in Toronto in 1997 and began performing as a duo called "Mainstream". After releasing an EP entitled Mainstream EP, they changed the band's name to "Metric", after a sound programmed by Shaw on his keyboard. Joshua Winstead and Joules Scott-Key joined the band in 2001. As of 2026, Metric has released ten studio albums: Old World Underground, Where Are You Now? (2003), Live It Out (2005), Grow Up and Blow Away (2007, but recorded in 2001), Fantasies (2009), Synthetica (2012), Pagans in Vegas (2015), Art of Doubt (2018), Formentera (2022), Formentera II (2023), and Romanticize The Dive (2026).

Haines also contributed vocals or backing vocals to songs by Broken Social Scene, Jason Collett, Stars, Delerium, K-Os, KC Accidental, The Stills, Tiësto, The Crystal Method, Rezz, and Todor Kobakov.

In 2004, Metric appeared in the 2004 drama film Clean. The band, appearing as themselves, performed their song "Dead Disco" and had minor speaking roles in a backstage scene. "Dead Disco" also featured on Clean Original Soundtrack. In 2010, she appeared as part of Broken Social Scene, on the soundtrack for the film This Movie is Broken. In 2006, as Emily Haines & The Soft Skeleton, Haines released the studio album Knives Don't Have Your Back. The songs "Our Hell" and "Doctor Blind" were issued as singles and corresponding music videos were produced. Following the release, Haines undertook a tour of North America in January 2007. Knives Don't Have Your Back was followed in 2007 by the EP What Is Free to a Good Home?, which was inspired by the death of her father. Her solo work is typically more subdued and piano-based than her work with Metric. She often appears with Amy Millan as her opening act.

Prior to the fourth Metric album Fantasies, Haines traveled to Argentina to write. She became good friends with Lou Reed and Laurie Anderson before Reed's death in 2013.

Haines contributed to Broken Social Scene's 2017 album Hug of Thunder and performed with Broken Social Scene on The Late Show with Stephen Colbert 30 March 2017. In May 2017, Haines was with Broken Social Scene in Manchester, England, the night after the terror attack at the Ariana Grande concert; she attributes her ability to carry on and play after the attack to the support of former The Smiths guitarist Johnny Marr.

On 15 September 2017, Emily Haines & The Soft Skeleton released the album Choir of the Mind; it was recorded a year earlier in Toronto and released by Last Gang Records and eOne (Entertainment One). The album's lead single, "Fatal Gift", was released on 9 June 2017. In support of the album, Haines toured North America in late 2017.

== Instruments ==
When performing with Metric, Haines plays two synthesizers. Her primary synthesizer is a Sequential Circuits Pro-One, which she has played since the band's early years. As secondary synthesizer, she played a Kawai MP9000, which was replaced by E-mu's PK-6 Proteus Keys in 2003, and was followed by the Clavia Nord Wave in 2012. She also plays the tambourine, electric guitar, piano and harmonica.

== Other projects ==
In August 2013, Haines became involved with FLEET4HEARme, a collaboration with Fleet Jewelry and HearMe, an organization that aims to increase children's access to music programs in public schools. In September 2015, the Canadian outerwear brand Rudsak unveiled a leather jacket customized by Haines. The jacket is a classic black motor-cycle style with lyrics from Metric song "The Governess" on the back.

Metric is active in the international advocacy organization Global Citizen, and Haines is involved with its girls and women issues campaign #SheDecides. In 2017, Haines partnered with House of Matriarch High Perfumery to create her own fragrance, "Siren".

== Discography ==
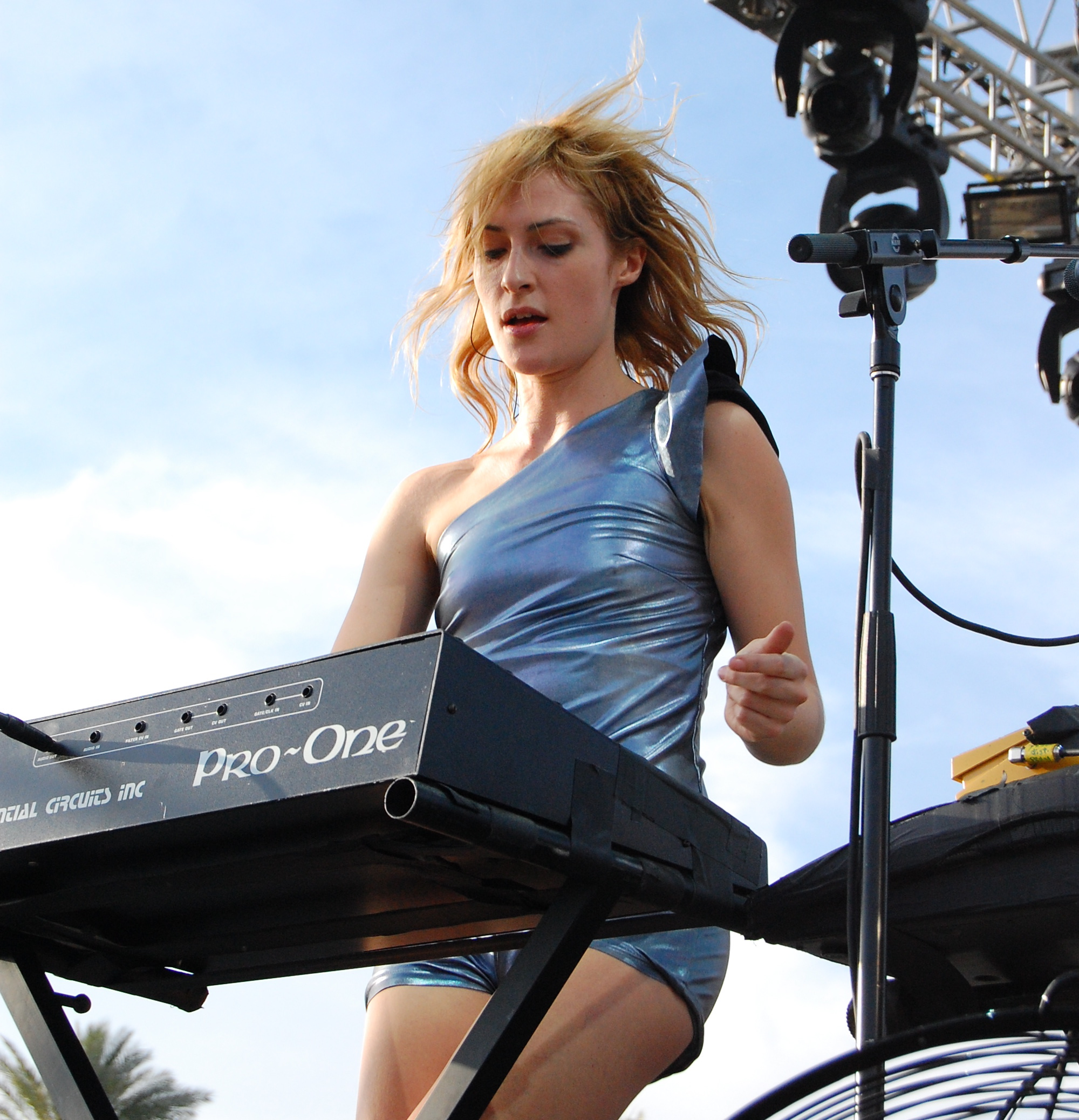
Haines at Coachella 2008

=== Emily Haines ===
Albums

- Cut in Half and Also Double (1996)

=== Emily Haines & The Soft Skeleton ===
Albums

- Knives Don't Have Your Back (2006, No. 28 in Canada)
- Choir of the Mind (2017, No. 42 in Canada)

EPs

- What Is Free to a Good Home? (2007)

Singles

- "Doctor Blind"
- "Our Hell"
- "Fatal Gift"
- "Statuette"

Music videos

- "Doctor Blind"
- "Our Hell"
- "Fatal Gift"
- "Planets"
- "Statuette"
- "Legend of the Wild Horse"

=== Metric ===
Albums

- Old World Underground, Where Are You Now? (2003)
- Live It Out (2005)
- Grow Up and Blow Away (2007)
- Fantasies (2009)
- Synthetica (2012)
- Pagans in Vegas (2015)
- Art of Doubt (2018)
- Formentera (2022)
- Formentera II (2023)
- Romanticize the Dive (2026)

=== Collaborations ===
The following songs are credited with Emily Haines on either lead or backing vocals:

Artist	Song	Album and Year
Broken Social Scene	"Anthems for a Seventeen-Year-Old Girl"	You Forgot It in People (2002)
Broken Social Scene	"Looks Just Like the Sun"	You Forgot It in People (2002)
Broken Social Scene	"Backyards"	Bee Hives (2004)
Broken Social Scene	"Windsurfing Nation"	Broken Social Scene (2005)
Broken Social Scene	"Swimmers"	Broken Social Scene (2005)
Broken Social Scene	"Superconnected"	Broken Social Scene (2005)
Broken Social Scene	"Bandwitch"	Broken Social Scene (2005)
Broken Social Scene	"Her Disappearing Theme"	To Be You and Me EP (2005)
Broken Social Scene	"Sentimental X's"	Forgiveness Rock Record (2010)
Broken Social Scene	"Protest Song"	Hug of Thunder (2017)
Broken Social Scene	"Vanity Pail Kids"	Hug of Thunder (2017)
Delerium	"Stopwatch Hearts"	Chimera (2003)
Delerium	"Glimmer"	Rarities & B-Sides (2015)
GoldieBlox	"Lightning Strikes"	
Jason Collett	"Hangover Days"	Idols of Exile (2005)
k-os	"Uptown Girl"	Yes! (2009)
KC Accidental	"Them (Pop Song No. 3333)"	Anthems for the Could've Bin Pills (2000)
Rezz	"Paper Walls"	Spiral (2021)
Stars	"Going, Going, Gone"	Nightsongs (2001)
Stars	"On Peak Hill"	Nightsongs (2001)
The Crystal Method	"Come Back Clean"	Divided by Night (2009)
The Stills	"Baby Blues"	Without Feathers (2006)
Tiësto	"Knock You Out"	Kaleidoscope (2009)
Todor Kobakov	"Carpe Diem"	Pop Music (2009)
Young Artists for Haiti	"Wavin' Flag"	

== Filmography ==
- Clean (2004, as herself)
- This Movie Is Broken (2010, performing with Broken Social Scene)
- Scott Pilgrim Takes Off (2023, as Envy Adams, only for singing, episode 2)
- I Love LA (2024, song "Help I'm Alive" featured in Season 1, Episode 5)

== Guest appearances ==
- Cameo appearance on the k-os music video, "Man I Used to Be".
- Cameo appearance on The Stills music video for "Love and Death" playing a secretary.
- Stars in Julian Plenti's music video for the song "Games For Days".
- Stars in Jason Collett music video for the song "Fire".

== Other sources ==
- Chan, Alvin. "Emily Haines – Pop Princess Sharpens her Knives". MusicOMH.com. Accessed 28 July 2008.
- Sweeny, Joey. "Indie Pop Goes Twee". The Rock History Reader. Ed. Theo Cateforis New York: Routledge, 2007.
