= Spirit If... =

Studio album by Kevin Drew
- Released: September 18, 2007
- Recorded: 2005–2007
- Genres: Indie rock, experimental
- Label: Arts & Crafts
- Producers: Kevin Drew, Ohad Benchetrit, Charles Spearin

Kevin Drew chronology
Broken Social Scene (2005)	Spirit If... (2007)	Something for All of Us... (2008)

Professional ratings
Aggregate scores
Source	Rating
Metacritic	72/100
Review scores
Source	Rating
AllMusic	3.5/5 stars
The A.V. Club	B+
Drowned in Sound	9/10
Filter	79%
NME	7/10
NOW Magazine	3/5 stars
Pitchfork	8.2/10
PopMatters	7/10
Rolling Stone	4/5 stars

Spirit If... is the debut solo album by Broken Social Scene co-founder Kevin Drew. It was released on September 18, 2007. The album is the first in a series entitled Broken Social Scene Presents:, with each album in the series being a particular member's solo efforts, assisted by fellow Broken Social Scene members. Brendan Canning's album Something for All of Us, the second in the series, was released in 2008.

Spirit If... was recorded with Ohad Benchetrit and Charles Spearin of Do Make Say Think and Broken Social Scene. The track listing, album cover, as well as an mp3 download for the song "Tbtf" (an initialism for "Too Beautiful to Fuck") were released on June 19, 2007. Spirit If... reached #113 on the Billboard 200 and #1 on the Top Heatseekers chart. "Backed Out on the..." was listed at #33 on Rolling Stone's list of the 100 Best Songs of 2007 and 99th on Pitchfork's list.

== Track listing ==
1. "Farewell to the Pressure Kids" – 5:49
2. "Tbtf" – 3:51
3. "Fucked Up Kid" – 5:09
4. "Safety Bricks" – 4:27
5. "Lucky Ones" – 6:44
6. "Broke Me Up" – 4:24
7. "Gang Bang Suicide" – 6:22
8. "Frightening Lives" – 6:12
9. "Underneath the Skin" – 0:46
10. "Big Love" – 3:19
11. "Backed Out on The..." – 4:16
12. "Aging Faces / Losing Places" – 4:31
13. "Bodhi Sappy Weekend" – 4:29
14. "When It Begins" – 5:01
15. "What You Gonna Be" (iTunes bonus track) – 4:05

== Sources ==
1. http://www.arts-crafts.ca/releases_spotlight.php?search=AC027
2. https://web.archive.org/web/20070621183237/http://www.pitchforkmedia.com/page/news/43720-kevin-drew-bss-series-lp-details-emerge
3. https://web.archive.org/web/20070701135609/http://www.pitchforkmedia.com/page/news/43494-kevin-drew-preps-lp-for-broken-social-scene-series
