= 7/4 =

7/4 may refer to:

- July 4 (month-day date notation)
- April 7 (day-month date notation)
- Septuple meter, a musical meter
- Harmonic seventh, a music interval
- "7/4 (Shoreline)", a song by Broken Social Scene from Broken Social Scene, 2005
