= Eats Darkness =

Studio album by Apostle of Hustle
- Released: May 19, 2009
- Genre: Indie rock
- Length: 35:44
- Label: Arts & Crafts
- Producer: Martin Davis Kinack

Apostle of Hustle chronology
National Anthem of Nowhere (2007)	Eats Darkness (2009)

Professional ratings
Aggregate scores
Source	Rating
Metacritic	57/100
Review scores
Source	Rating
CHARTattack	4/5 stars
Crawdaddy!	(favorable)
Metro News	3.5/5 stars
Pitchfork	(5.9/10)
PopMatters	5/10 stars

Eats Darkness is Apostle of Hustle's third studio LP, released on May 19, 2009 to generally positive reviews. According to Andrew Whiteman, the album is "a serial poem about some struggles people go through. Battles, from the macro to the micro. Songs about tactics and attitudes needed in 'life during wartime'. Each track is like tapas at the banquet of conflict. A small contribution to the articulation of a fucked and beautiful world."

== Track listing ==
1. "Snakes" – 0:29
2. "Eazy Speaks" – 3:19
3. "Soul Unwind" – 5:29
4. "Sign" – 1:21
5. "Perfect Fit" – 3:22
6. "Xerses" – 4:28
7. "What Are You Talking About?" – 0:24
8. "Whistle in the Fog" – 4:23
9. "Eats Darkness" – 2:58
10. "Return to Sender" – 0:55
11. "How to Defeat a More Powerful Enemy" – 3:13
12. "Nobody Bought It" – 1:11
13. "Blackberry" – 4:12
