= Broken Social Scene (album) =

Studio album by Broken Social Scene
- Released: October 4, 2005
- Recorded: 2004–2005
- Genre: Indie rock
- Length: 63:14
- Label: Arts & Crafts
- Producer: David Newfeld

Broken Social Scene chronology
Bee Hives (2004)	Broken Social Scene (2005)	Spirit If... (2007)

Singles from Broken Social Scene
- 1. "Ibi Dreams of Pavement (A Better Day)" / "All the Gods" Released: November 28, 2005; 2. "7/4 (Shoreline)" Released: March 27, 2006; 3. "Fire Eye'd Boy" / "Canada vs. America (Exhaust Pipe Remix)" Released: June 26, 2006

Broken Social Scene is the third studio album by Canadian indie rock band Broken Social Scene, released by Arts & Crafts on October 4, 2005. In addition to the musicians who contributed to the band's prior release You Forgot It in People, guest contributors on Broken Social Scene include k-os, Jason Tait of The Weakerthans, and Murray Lightburn of The Dears.

The initial pressings of the album were issued with a seven-track bonus EP titled EP to Be You and Me, a play on the title of Marlo Thomas' children's album Free to Be... You and Me; the Japanese release is still issued with the EP. The vinyl pressing was released on two LPs, with the first three sides comprising the album and the fourth side being the EP.

The album was certified Gold in Canada on September 14, 2012.

== Background ==
The album was originally to be titled Windsurfing Nation, a title which was applied to the album's seventh track after the band made the decision to self-title it; the original artwork was to be a cartoon rendition of Pangaea, which was later scrapped in favor of the current artwork drawn by lead singer Kevin Drew.

The title of the song "Ibi Dreams of Pavement (A Better Day)" refers to the Canadian novelist Ibi Kaslik, a friend of the band. It is also suggested that Broken Social Scene was an inspiration for the titular band in Kaslik's second novel The Angel Riots, about a rising indie rock band from Montreal. Kaslik attended the Etobicoke School of the Arts with members of the band and helped them on their first tour of Canada and the United States. Although Kaslik has stated "It's definitely based on a world that I know", she brushed off claims that the connection goes substantially deep, saying "it would be mistaken and scurrilous to try to identify individual people". She warns against "scouring the pages for thinly disguised characterizations of [...] Kevin Drew, [...] Emily Haines or [...] Amy Millan".

== Reception ==
Professional ratings
Aggregate scores
Source	Rating
Metacritic	82/100
Review scores
Source	Rating
AllMusic	4.5/5 stars
Blender	4/5 stars
The Guardian	3/5 stars
Mojo	4/5 stars
NME	8/10
Pitchfork	8.4/10
Q	3/5 stars
Rolling Stone	3/5 stars
Spin	B+
Uncut	4/5 stars

At the 2006 Juno Awards, Broken Social Scene won the award for Alternative Album of the Year; it was also shortlisted for the 2006 Polaris Music Prize.

However, the album divided critics more than its predecessor You Forgot It in People. Whereas the earlier album had received almost universal critical praise, Broken Social Scene's less rigidly-structured songs were praised by some critics, but derided by others as overly self-indulgent. Nevertheless, the album reached the number-one position on American college charts and received widespread critical acclaim in the UK. As of 2008, sales in the United States have exceeded 108,000 copies, according to Nielsen SoundScan.

== Track listing ==
No.	Title	Length
1.	"Our Faces Split the Coast in Half"	3:42
2.	"Ibi Dreams of Pavement (A Better Day)"	4:27
3.	"7/4 (Shoreline)"	4:53
4.	"Finish Your Collapse and Stay for Breakfast"	1:24
5.	"Major Label Debut"	4:28
6.	"Fire Eye'd Boy"	3:58
7.	"Windsurfing Nation"	4:35
8.	"Swimmers"	2:55
9.	"Hotel"	4:35
10.	"Handjobs for the Holidays"	4:39
11.	"Superconnected"	5:39
12.	"Bandwitch"	6:58
13.	"Tremoloa Debut"	0:59
14.	"It's All Gonna Break"	9:55
Total length:		63:14

EP to Be You and Me
No.	Title	Length
1.	"Her Disappearing Theme"	2:53
2.	"Canada vs. America"	6:08
3.	"Baroque Social"	3:02
4.	"No Smiling Darkness / Snake Charmers Association"	5:37
5.	"All My Friends"	2:42
6.	"Major Label Debut (Fast)"	3:12
7.	"Feel Good Lost Reprise"	3:02
Total length:		26:39

Despite the EP having a limited release, two music videos were made for the songs "Her Disappearing Theme" and "Major Label Debut (Fast)".

== Personnel ==
Credits are adapted from the album's liner notes. Most performers in the band are credited by their first names only in the liner notes.

Broken Social Scene

- Brendan Canning ("Brendan") – artwork, booklet drawing colouring, performer
- Kevin Drew ("Kevin") – artwork, covers, booklet covers, performer (2–6, 8–12, 14)
- Justin Peroff ("Justin") – artwork, booklet drawings, sketches on booklet pages 13, 24 & 27, performer
- Charles Spearin ("Charlie" and "Charles") – performer (1, 3, 5, 10 as "Charlie"; 6, 8, 14 as "Charles")
- Andrew Whiteman ("Andrew") – performer (1–3, 5–7, 9–12, 14)
- Jason Collett ("Jason") – performer (3, 5, 6, 9, 11)
- David Newfeld ("David" and "Dave") – producer, mixing, performer (1, 3–7, 9–12 as "David"; 13 as "Dave")
- Feist – performer (1, 3, 7, 14)
- Emily Haines ("Emily") – performer (8, 11, 12)
- James Shaw ("James" and "Jimmy") – performer (2, 11, 14, as "James"; 10 as "Jimmy")
- Evan Cranley ("Evan") – performer (1–3, 8, 9, 14)
- Amy Millan ("Amy") – performer (2, 5, 9, 12)
- Ohad Benchetrit ("Ohad") – performer (2, 12)
- Martin Davis Kinack – performer (Note: Indicates that a performer is credited as part of the band, but not credited on any songs.)
- Jo-Ann Goldsmith ("Jo-Ann") – performer (3)
- Torquil Campbell ("Torq") – performer (14)
- John Crossingham – performer

Additional musicians

- Jason Tait ("Jason T.") – performer (10)
- Julie Penner ("Julie") – performer (5, 10)
- k-os – performer (7)
- Murray Lightburn ("Murray") – performer (1)

Production

- Noah Mintz – mastering

Artwork

- Louise Upperton – design & layout
- Christopher Mills – artwork, booklet drawings

== In popular culture ==
The instrumental introduction to "7/4 (Shoreline)" is used as the theme music for CBC Radio One's Mainstreet programme broadcast on CBHA in Halifax, Nova Scotia.

== Charts ==
Chart performance for Broken Social Scene
Chart (2005–2006)	Peak position
Canadian Albums (Nielsen SoundScan)	17
French Albums (SNEP)	144
Irish Albums (IRMA)	27
Scottish Albums (Official Charts)	66
UK Albums (Official Charts)	80
UK Independent Albums (Official Charts)	10
US Billboard 200	105
US Heatseekers Albums (Billboard)	2
US Independent Albums (Billboard)	6

== Certifications and sales ==
Certifications and sales for Broken Social Scene
Region	Certification	Certified units/sales
Canada (Music Canada)	Gold	50,000^{^}
United States	—	108,000
^{^} Shipments figures based on certification alone.
