= Anthems for the Could've Bin Pills =

Studio album by KC Accidental
- Released: 2000
- Length: 46:02
- Label: Noise Factory

KC Accidental chronology
Captured Anthems for an Empty Bathtub (1998)	Anthems for the Could've Bin Pills (2000)

Professional ratings
Review scores
Source	Rating
Pitchfork	7.4/10

Anthems for the Could've Bin Pills is a 2000 album by KC Accidental. It is a companion album to Captured Anthems for an Empty Bathtub, with tracks 1–6 on one album and 7–12 on the other.

Many of the musicians involved went on to record Feel Good Lost the following year under the name Broken Social Scene.

== Track listing ==
All music is composed by Kevin Drew and Charles Spearin

No.	Title	Length
1.	"Unknown"	0:04
2.	"Unknown"	0:04
3.	"Unknown"	0:04
4.	"Unknown"	0:04
5.	"Unknown"	0:04
6.	"Unknown"	0:04
7.	"Instrumental Died in the Bathtub and Took the Daydreams With It"	8:53
8.	"Residential Love Song"	4:55
9.	"Silver Fish Eyelashes"	8:45
10.	"Ruined in 84"	3:11
11.	"Them (Pop Song #3333)"	7:11
12.	"Is and Of The"	21:52
Total length:		46:02

When Captured Anthems was reissued by Noise Factory in 2003, the order was reversed so that the six music tracks were followed by the six blank tracks.
