= Apostle of Hustle =

Canadian indie rock band

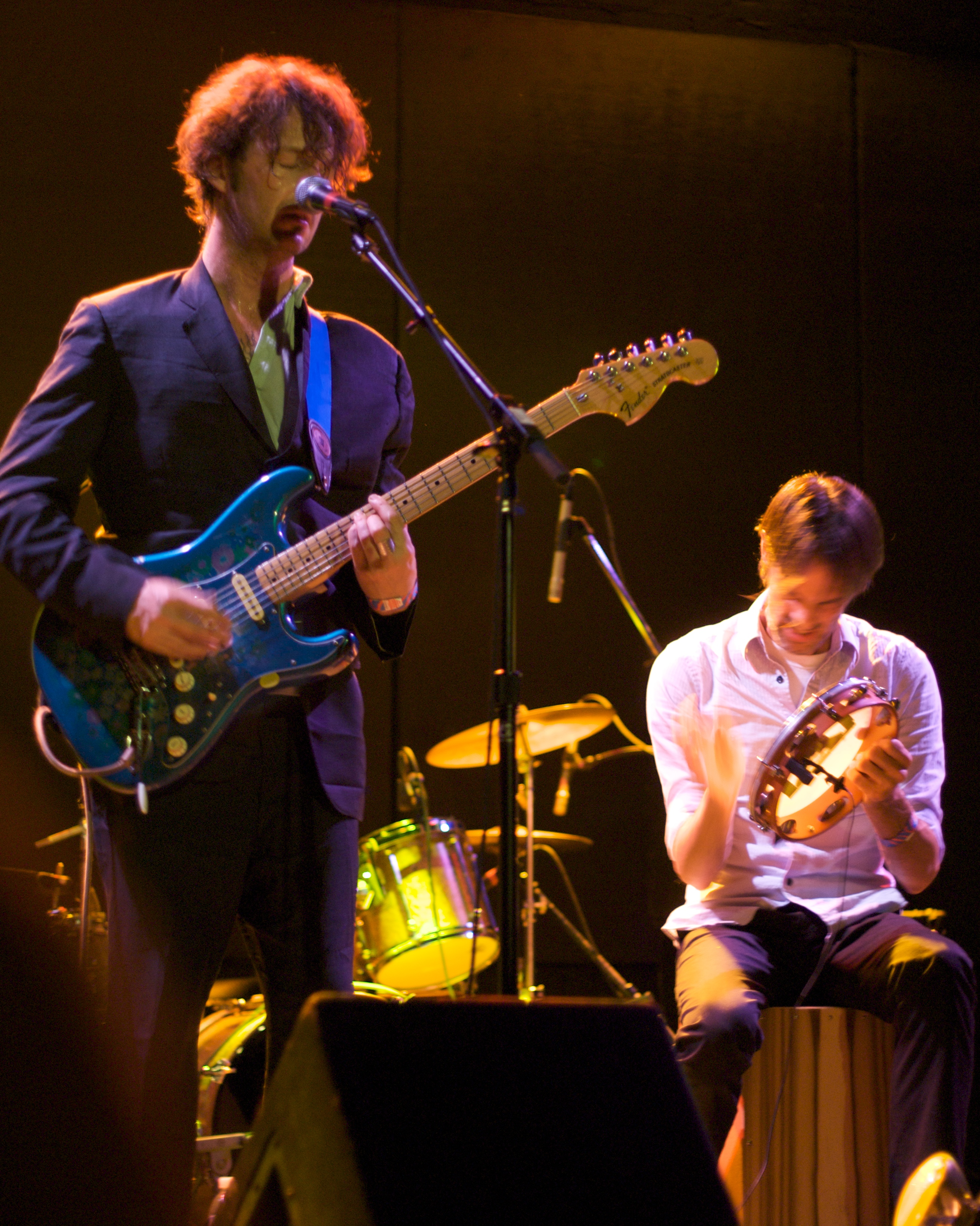
- Apostle of Hustle performing at the Bowery Ballroom in New York City, June 10, 2009

Background information
- Origin: Toronto, Ontario, Canada
- Genres: Indie rock
- Years active: 2001–2009
- Label: Arts & Crafts
- Members: Andrew Whiteman; Julian Brown; Dean Stone

Apostle of Hustle was a Canadian indie rock group, formed as a side project in 2001 by Andrew Whiteman, who has also been in Bourbon Tabernacle Choir and Que Vida. He currently plays as the lead guitarist for the indie supergroup Broken Social Scene.

== History ==
After a two-month stay in Cuba, where he learned to play the Cuban guitar tres, Whiteman returned to Toronto to resume writing and recording with Broken Social Scene. Wanting to create the music inspired by his time in Cuba, Whiteman recruited Julian Brown and Dean Stone and created Apostle Of Hustle. The band played Brazilian and Cuban folk songs, as well as covers of songs by Tom Waits, PJ Harvey and Marc Ribot.

Folkloric Feel was released on Arts & Crafts in late summer 2004. It included guest appearances by Kevin Drew, Amy Millan, Brendan Canning, Evan Cranley, and Feist. That was followed by a three-track EP, with Supergrass and Ikara Colt, called Devil in the Woods.>

In 2007, Apostle of Hustle released their second album, National Anthem of Nowhere. Cranley performed on this album as well; the guest list also included Liam O'Neil and Lisa Lobsinger.

In April, the band released a 3-track EP which was three different versions of the National Anthem of Nowhere song "My Sword Hand's Anger". In May, Apostle of Hustle and Tanya Tagaq recorded a 3-track EP on the CBC Radio's Fuse. Tagaq then went on tour with the band. In December 2007, they released the 6-track EP U King.

In 2009, the band announced that they would be going on a Southern Ontario tour to promote their new album and conducted a talent search for opening acts. But they went on a North American tour with Gogol Bordello; their own tour didn't take place.

The album Eats Darkness was released on May 19, 2009.

Apostle of Hustle was featured as the X3 Artist of the month by Aux.tv and CBC Radio 3 for June 2009.

In 2011, an Apostle of Hustle poster appeared in the seventh episode of the U.S. television series Skins.

== Discography ==
=== Albums ===
- Folkloric Feel (2004)
- National Anthem of Nowhere (2007)
- Eats Darkness (2009)

=== EPs ===
- Devil in the Woods, with Supergrass and Ikara Colt (2005)
- U King (2007)
- My Sword Hand's Anger (2007)
- CBC Fuse Session, with Tanya Tagaq (2007)

== Music videos ==
- "National Anthem of Nowhere" (2007, directed by Jeffrey St. Jules and Adrienne Amato)
- "Cheap Like Sebastien" (October 2007)

== See also ==
- Music of Canada
- List of bands from Canada
- Canadian rock
