= Sam Goldberg Jr. =

Canadian musician

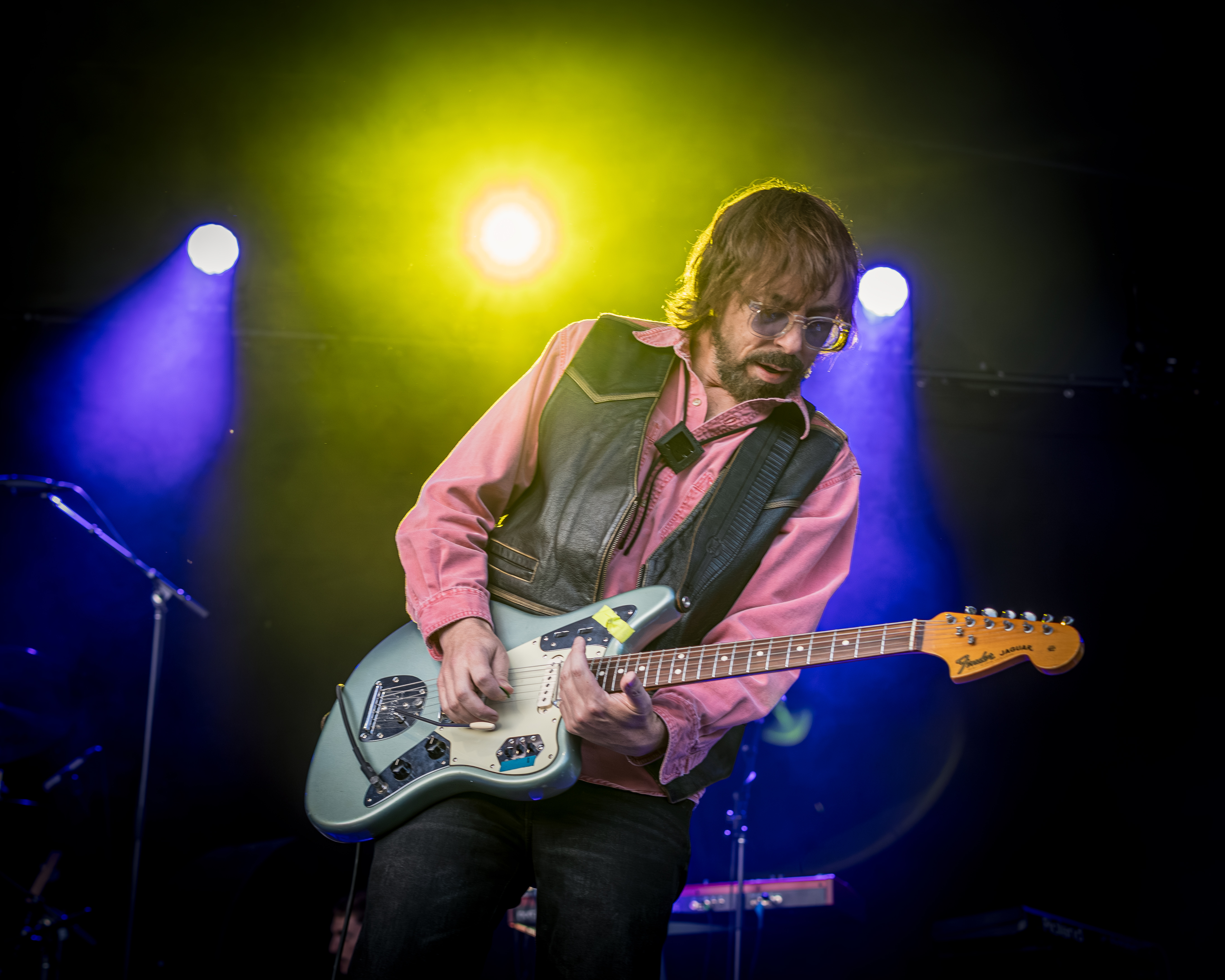
- Sam Goldberg of Broken Social Scene (2025)

Background information
- Born: Sam Goldberg Jr.
- Origin: Hudson, Quebec, Canada
- Instruments: Guitar, bass guitar, vocals

Sam Goldberg Jr. is a Canadian musician from Hudson, Quebec. He is best known as a longtime member of the indie rock collective Broken Social Scene, which he joined in 2007, and with whom he has recorded three studio albums, Forgiveness Rock Record (2010), Hug of Thunder (2017) and Remember the Humans (2026).

Early in his musical career Goldberg gained recognition as the bassist of Bodega, a Toronto-based rock band that received a nomination for "best alternative album" at the Juno Awards with their 1998 album, Bring Yourself Up. Prior to joining Broken Social Scene, Goldberg worked with BSS producer Dave Newfeld on Hawaii, a short-lived band whose 2003 self-titled debut received critical praise.

Goldberg's current projects include a collaboration with singer-songwriter Kandle Osborne; their debut EP, Kandle, was released in May 2012 and has garnered favorable reviews. Goldberg is also the frontman of his own project, Yardlets, which he formed with friend Jeff Edwards in 2011.

In 2014, he was nominated for Producer Of The Year for his work on Kandle's "In Flames" at the Félix Awards which occurs on an annual basis to artists in the Canadian province of Quebec.

== Discography ==
Kandle

- In Flames (2014)
- Kandle – EP (2012)

Yardlets

- Middle Ages (2012)

Broken Social Scene

- Forgiveness Rock Record (2010)
- Hug of Thunder (2017)
- Remember the Humans (2026)

Uncut

- Modern Currencies, (2006)
- Those Who Were Hung Hang Here, (2004)

Hawaii

- Self Titled (2003)

Bodega

- Without A Plan (2001)
- Bring Yourself Up (1998)

Bionic

- Self Titled (1998)
