= Jo-ann Goldsmith =

Canadian musician

Jo-ann Goldsmith is a trumpet player in the Canadian indie-rock band Broken Social Scene. Although a social worker by training, she played shows with the band in their early years. She is the ex-wife of de facto bandleader Kevin Drew.
