= Folkloric Feel =

Studio album by Apostle of Hustle
- Released: 24 August 2004
- Genre: Indie rock
- Length: 47:54
- Label: Arts & Crafts
- Producer: Dave Newfeld

Apostle of Hustle chronology
Folkloric Feel (2004)	National Anthem of Nowhere (2007)

Professional ratings
Review scores
Source	Rating
AllMusic	4/5 stars
Pitchfork	(7.7/10)
Tiny Mix Tapes	5/5 stars

Folkloric Feel is Apostle of Hustle's debut album. It is indie rock with very subtle Latin influences, incorporating the sound stylings of the tres and permutations of Latin rhythms.

== Track listing ==
1. "Folkloric Feel" – 7:49
2. "Sleepwalking Ballad" – 5:22
3. "Baby, You're in Luck" – 2:22
4. "Energy of Death" – 3:35
5. "Kings & Queens" – 5:07
6. "Song for Lorca" – 3:55
7. "Animal Fat" – 4:44
8. "Dark Is What I Want / Strutters Ball" – 4:06
9. "Gleaning" – 4:31
10. "They Shoot Horses, Don't They" – 5:53
11. "Wedding Song" – 0:38 (some CD releases)/5:45 (2LP version)
12. "The Wristwatch of the Shepherdess" - 4:09 (2LP version)

The 0:38 version of "Wedding Song" is an untitled bonus track not included in all CD pressings. The 5:45 version and "The Wristwatch of the Shepherdess" (an interpretative cover of the Cuban traditional "El Reloj de Pastora" by Arsenio Rodríguez) can be found on two different editions of the Arts & Crafts promotional compilation CD Adventures in Advertising, as well as some digital download editions of this album.
