= Hug of Thunder =

Studio album by Broken Social Scene
- Released: July 7, 2017
- Genres: Indie rock, baroque pop
- Length: 52:19
- Label: Arts & Crafts
- Producers: Joe Chiccarelli; Nyles Spencer

Broken Social Scene chronology
Forgiveness Rock Record (2010)	Hug of Thunder (2017)	Let's Try the After (Vol. 1) (2019)

Singles from Hug of Thunder
- 1. "Halfway Home" Released: 2017; 2. "Hug of Thunder" Released: 2017

Hug of Thunder is the fifth studio album by Canadian indie rock musical collective Broken Social Scene. It was released by the Arts & Crafts record label on July 7, 2017.

== Background ==
After declaring a hiatus in September 2011, Broken Social Scene performed at the Field Trip Arts & Crafts Music Festival in 2013 and played a few other festivals in 2015, which prompted band members Kevin Drew, Brendan Canning, Charles Spearin, Justin Peroff, and Andrew Whiteman to discuss recording new material. "When we're working, we understand that there will be a lot more input, so we leave space in the music as we're writing it," Spearin said. "We would send out invitations for all the usual crew, and say, 'Hey, we're doing this again. Would you be interested in being part of this?'" In the end, eighteen musicians were credited on Hug of Thunder. During sessions for the album, Feist conceived the idea for the title track, her first lead vocal on a Broken Social Scene song since 2006. Drew explained that the title represents "exactly who we are. That is our show. We're trying to create that hug of thunder. That sound. That embrace amongst the chaos."

== Reception ==
Professional ratings
Aggregate scores
Source	Rating
AnyDecentMusic?	7.3/10
Metacritic	76/100
Review scores
Source	Rating
AllMusic	4/5 stars
The A.V. Club	B+
The Guardian	4/5 stars
The Independent	3/5 stars
The Irish Times	4/5 stars
Mojo	3/5 stars
Pitchfork	8.4/10
Q	4/5 stars
Rolling Stone	3.5/5 stars
Uncut	8/10

Hug of Thunder received positive reviews from music critics. At Metacritic, which assigns a normalized rating out of 100 to reviews from mainstream critics, the album received an average score of 76, based on 30 reviews.

=== Accolades ===
Publication	Accolade	Year	Rank	Ref.
Diffuser	Top 25 Albums of 2017	2017	9	
Drowned in Sound	Top 100 Albums of 2017	2017	58	
Time Out New York	Top 29 Albums of 2017	2017	9	
Under the Radar	Top 100 Albums of 2017	2017	11	
Vulture	Top 10 Albums of 2017	2017	10	

== Track listing ==
Hug of Thunder track listing
No.	Title	Writer(s)	Length
1.	"Sol Luna"	Brendan Canning; Kevin Drew; Shawndra Everett	1:20
2.	"Halfway Home"	Canning; Drew; Ariel Engle; Justin Peroff; Charles Spearin; Andrew Whiteman	4:41
3.	"Protest Song"	Canning; Drew; Emily Haines; Peroff; Spearin; Whiteman	4:18
4.	"Skyline"	Canning; Drew; Peroff; Spearin; Whiteman	4:10
5.	"Stay Happy"	Canning; Drew; Engle; Peroff; Spearin; Whiteman	4:10
6.	"Vanity Pail Kids"	Canning; Drew; Peroff; Spearin; Whiteman	4:01
7.	"Hug of Thunder"	Canning; Drew; Feist; Peroff; Spearin; Whiteman	4:54
8.	"Towers and Masons"	Canning; Drew; Engle; Peroff; Spearin; Whiteman	4:01
9.	"Victim Lover"	Canning; Evan Cranley; Drew; Peroff; Spearin; Whiteman	4:55
10.	"Please Take Me with You"	Canning; Drew; Peroff; Spearin; Whiteman	4:54
11.	"Gonna Get Better"	Canning; Drew; Engle; Peroff; Spearin; Whiteman	5:11
12.	"Mouth Guards of the Apocalypse"	Canning; Cranley; Drew; Sam Goldberg; Peroff; Jimmy Shaw; Spearin; Whiteman	5:44

== Personnel ==
Musicians

- Ohad Benchetrit – slide guitar (2, 5, 8, 9, 11), electric guitar (9)
- Brendan Canning – bass guitar (2–5, 7, 8), background vocals (2, 3, 6, 8, 9), synth (3, 9, 10), electric guitar (5, 6, 10, 12), bass synth (7, 10, 11), piano (7, 10), acoustic guitar (8), guitar loops (8, 11), lead vocals (8), vocals (10)
- Joe Chiccarelli – drum programming (7, 10, 11)
- Evan Cranley – trombone (2, 4–6, 9, 12), electric guitar (6)
- Kevin Drew – background vocals (2, 4, 6), lead vocals (2, 4, 6, 10–12), vocals (3), acoustic guitar (2–4, 10), electric guitar (2, 3, 5, 8, 12), piano (2, 5–7, 12), drums (3), percussion (3, 5, 8), bass synth (3, 8, 11), electronic drums (3, 9, 10), beat box (5), sound effects (6), synth (6, 7, 10, 11), B3 organ (7), bass guitar (8, 10), Nord strings (8, 11, 12), Rhodes (9), keyboard (12)
- Ariel Engle – background vocals (2, 5, 11), lead vocals (2, 11), vocals (5, 6, 8, 10)
- Shawn Everett – background vocals, synth (8)
- Feist – background vocals (2, 7), vocals (5, 6), lead vocals (7), Baldwin keys (7), organ (7)
- David French – saxophone (2, 6, 8, 9), flute (5)
- Sam Goldberg – keytar (5), electric guitar (6, 11, 12)
- Emily Haines – background vocals (3), lead vocals (3), vocals (6)
- Julia Hambleton – clarinet (2, 5, 6, 8, 9)
- Lisa Lobsinger – vocals (8, 9)
- Dave Manelin – vocals (6)
- Roger Manning – vocoder (4)
- Amy Millan – background vocals (2, 4, 11), vocals (9)
- Julie Penner – violin (5)
- Justin Peroff – drums (2–12), percussion (4, 9, 10)
- Jimmy Shaw – trumpet (2, 4, 12)
- Charles Spearin – electric guitar (2, 3, 5, 7, 8, 12), nyckelharpa (2, 12), Hammertone guitar (3, 4), synth (4, 10), bass synth (5, 9), background vocals (6), air spray percussion (7), Melotron guitar (7, 12), drum machine (10), Farfisa organ (10), slide guitar (10), B3 organ (10, 11), trumpet (11)
- Nyles Spencer – sampler (7–9, 11), bass synth (10)
- Andrew Whiteman – electric guitar (2–6, 8–10), synth (2, 4, 6, 7, 10–12), vocals (4, 10), drum machine (5, 7, 8, 10–12), acoustic guitar (7, 12), fuzz bass (8), background vocals (9), tres guitar (9), bass synth (12)

Technical

- Joe Chiccarelli – production
- Nyles Spencer – production
- Shawn Everett – mixing
- Emily Lazar – mastering
- Chris Allgood – mastering assistance

== Charts ==
Chart (2017)	Peak position
Australian Hitseekers Albums (ARIA)	3
Belgian Albums (Ultratop Flanders)	102
Canadian Albums (Billboard)	14
Scottish Albums (Official Charts)	51
US Billboard 200	96
US Independent Albums (Billboard)	3
US Top Alternative Albums (Billboard)	11
US Top Rock Albums (Billboard)	17
