= Kevin Drew =

Canadian musician and songwriter

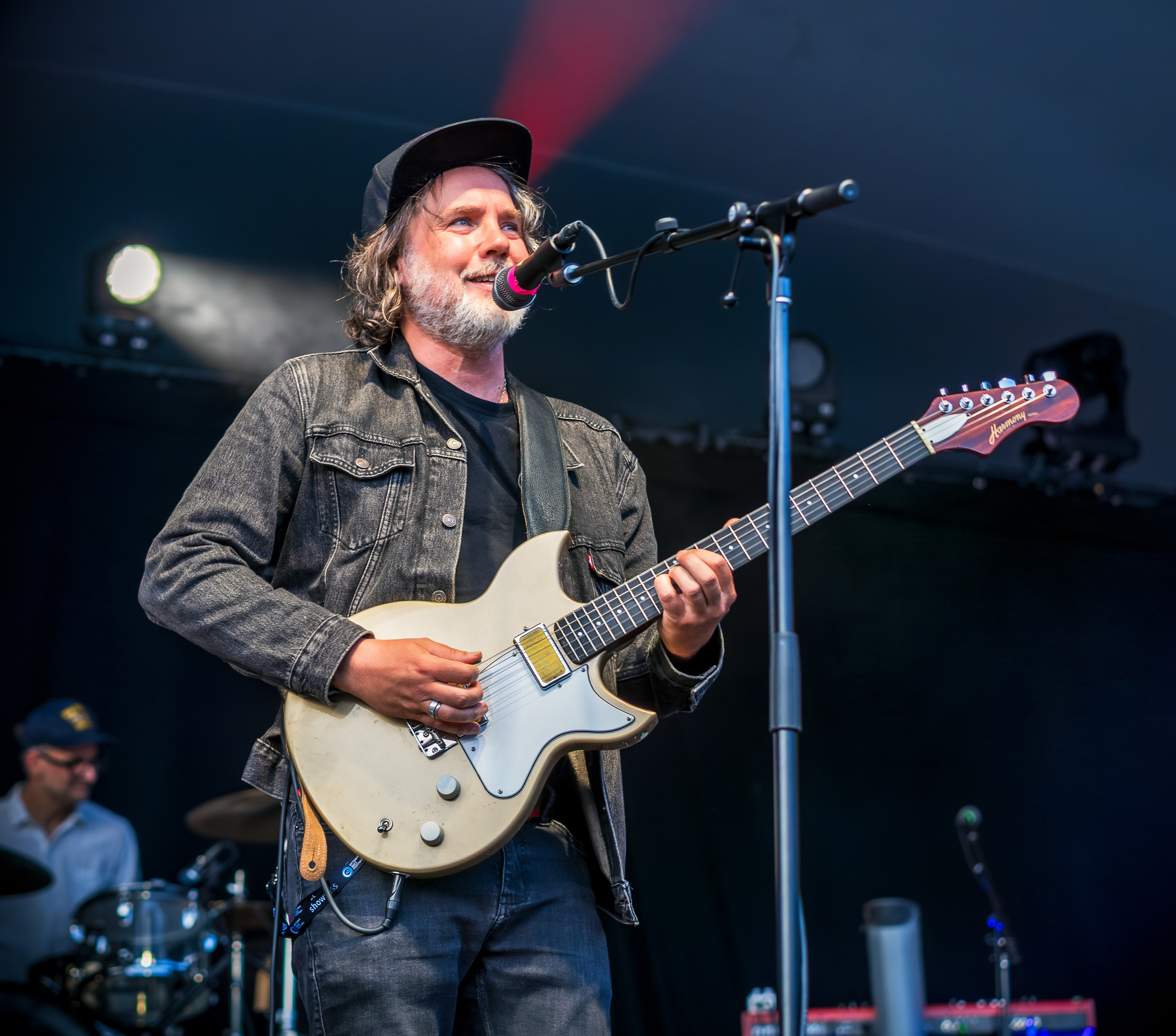
- Kevin Drew at Ottawa Jazz Festival in 2025.

Background information
- Born: September 7, 1976 (age 50)
- Origin: Toronto, Ontario, Canada
- Genres: Indie rock, baroque pop, alternative
- Label: Arts & Crafts
- Website: kevindrewmusic.com

Kevin Drew (born September 9, 1976) is a Canadian musician and songwriter who, together with Brendan Canning, founded the expansive Toronto baroque-pop collective Broken Social Scene. He was also part of the lesser-known KC Accidental, which consisted of Drew and Charles Spearin, another current member of Broken Social Scene.

Drew has co-directed Broken Social Scene videos under the name Experimental Parachute Movement. In 2008, he wrote and directed a short film called The Water, inspired by and starring his bandmate and former girlfriend Leslie Feist. In 2009, Drew contributed to the AIDS benefit album, Dark Was the Night, produced by the Red Hot Organization.

Drew grew up in west Toronto and attended the Etobicoke School of the Arts, along with Metric's Emily Haines, Stars' Amy Millan, and novelist Ibi Kaslik, where he, Amy and Emily studied drama. He was married to Jo-ann Goldsmith, a social worker and an occasional trumpet player in BSS.

Drew's second solo album, Darlings, was released on March 18, 2014.

On January 15, 2013, Drew announced in an interview that he had begun working on a new album with The Archies songwriter, Andy Kim. The album, It's Decided, was released in 2015.

Drew's third solo album, Influences, was released on July 16, 2021. He wrote the album while staying in England during 2020, using a music making smartphone app called Endlesss. The album was recorded and mixed on Drew's return to Canada.

== Production ==
Drew and Dave Hamelin coproduced The Tragically Hip's album Man Machine Poem, and Gord Downie's subsequent solo album Secret Path.

Drew also produced Downie's final album Introduce Yerself and Reuben and the Dark's third album, un love.

== Discography ==
=== Solo ===
- Spirit If... (2007)
- Darlings (2014)
- Influences (2021) (as K.D.A.P.)
- Aging (2023)

=== Broken Social Scene ===
- Feel Good Lost (2001)
- You Forgot It in People (2002)
- Bee Hives (2004)
- Broken Social Scene (2005)
- Forgiveness Rock Record (2010)
- Hug of Thunder (2017)
- Remember the Humans (2026)

=== KC Accidental ===
- Captured Anthems for an Empty Bathtub - (1998)
- Anthems for the Could've Bin Pills - (2000)

== Videography ==
=== Experimental Parachute Movement ===
- Apostle of Hustle
  - Cheap Like Sebastian
- Broken Social Scene
  - Ibi Dreams of Pavement (A Better Day)
  - Almost Crimes (with Chris Mills)
  - Cause=Time
  - Fire Eye'd Boy
- Constantines
  - Our Age 2009
- Stars
  - Your Ex-Lover is Dead
  - Bitches in Tokyo
- Still Life Still
  - Pastel
- The Most Serene Republic
  - Content Was Always My Favourite Colour
- The Water (2009) Starring Cillian Murphy, David Fox & Feist
