= You Forgot It in People =

Studio album by Broken Social Scene
- Released: October 15, 2002
- Recorded: December 2001 – July 2002
- Genre: Indie rock
- Length: 56:11
- Labels: Arts & Crafts; Paper Bag
- Producer: David Newfeld

Broken Social Scene chronology
Feel Good Lost (2001)	You Forgot It in People (2002)	Bee Hives (2004)

2003 reissue cover

You Forgot It in People is the second studio album by Canadian indie rock band and collective Broken Social Scene, released on October 15, 2002. It was the band's commercial and critical breakthrough following their debut album, Feel Good Lost, owing mainly to the band's increased size and subsequent increased focus on vocal-led songs and more fully-fledged songwriting. You Forgot It in People features intricate, experimental production techniques and a large number of instruments, also coinciding with the band's vastly expanded size. Local excitement for the album led to initial pressings selling out quickly, necessitating a 2003 reissue.

Music videos were made for "Stars and Sons", "Cause = Time", "Almost Crimes (Radio Kills Remix)", "Lover's Spit", and "I'm Still Your Fag".

Unused songs from the recording sessions for You Forgot It in People were later featured on the B-sides release Bee Hives, released in 2004.

== Music ==
Following the release of Feel Good Lost, Broken Social Scene's lineup drastically expanded, leading to the band progressing their style from the instrumental, atmospheric focus of Feel Good Lost into more broadly accessible rock and pop; as such, You Forgot It in People prominently incorporates "proper" song structure, with more defined verses and choruses. As they expanded into an 11 piece collective, Broken Social Scene used a variety of sounds for the album, including usage of chamber-influenced arrangements on certain songs, as well as unconventional technique of standard instruments. Reflecting on this, frontman Kevin Drew said, "I was scared to see if people were going to embrace the idea of a whole shitload of sounds on one album."

== Reception ==
Professional ratings
Aggregate scores
Source	Rating
Metacritic	86/100
Review scores
Source	Rating
AllMusic	4.5/5 stars
Eye Weekly	5/5 stars
Houston Chronicle	5/5 stars
Now	5/5
The Philadelphia Inquirer	3.5/4 stars
Pitchfork	9.2/10
Q	4/5 stars
Rolling Stone	3/5 stars
Spin	B+
Stylus Magazine	A−

On review aggregate site Metacritic, it earned a normalized score of 86 out of 100, based on 18 reviews, indicating "universal acclaim". Critics were almost unanimously enthusiastic. Pitchfork's Ryan Schreiber gave the album a 9.2 out of 10 saying "You Forgot It in People explodes with song after song of endlessly re-playable, perfect pop." The songs "Cause = Time" and "Stars and Sons" are listed at No. 145 and No. 275 on Pitchfork Media's Top 500 Songs of the 2000s list, respectively. A Kludge writer called it a "majestic" album, in which the group created a "unique sound of lush instrumentation." A PopMatters review for the album was positive, although criticized the song "I'm Still Your Fag" for its "uncomfortably graphic lyrics". Conversely, Robert Christgau of The Village Voice selected "Almost Crimes (Radio Kills Remix)" as a "choice cut", indicating a "good song on an album that isn't worth your time or money." In 2003, the album won the Juno Award for Alternative Album of the Year. The album received the following accolades:

Publication	List	Place
Pitchfork	The Top 100 Albums of 2000−04	27
Pitchfork	Staff Lists: The Top 200 Albums of the 2000s	23
Rhapsody	Alt/Indie's Best Album of the Decade	9
Stylus Magazine	Top 50 Albums: 2000−2005	7

By 2005, sales in the United States had exceeded 77,000 copies, according to Nielsen SoundScan.

In 2018, the album won the Polaris Heritage Prize Audience Award in the 1996-2005 category.

"It's a very balmy and hungover post-rock record," observed Bloc Party frontman Kele Okereke. "Really tender."

== Legacy ==
Singaporean singer Yeule recorded a cover of "Anthems for a Seventeen Year-Old Girl" for the soundtrack of the 2024 horror film I Saw the TV Glow.

In June 2025, Arts & Crafts released Anthems: A Celebration of Broken Social Scene's You Forgot It in People, a cover album in which another artist each reimagines a track from the original album.

== Track listing ==
No.	Title	Length
1.	"Capture the Flag"	2:08
2.	"KC Accidental"	3:50
3.	"Stars and Sons"	5:08
4.	"Almost Crimes (Radio Kills Remix)"	4:22
5.	"Looks Just Like the Sun"	4:23
6.	"Pacific Theme"	5:09
7.	"Anthems for a Seventeen Year-Old Girl"	4:35
8.	"Cause = Time"	5:30
9.	"Late Nineties Bedroom Rock for the Missionaries"	3:46
10.	"Shampoo Suicide"	4:05
11.	"Lover's Spit"	6:22
12.	"I'm Still Your Fag"	4:23
13.	"Pitter Patter Goes My Heart"	2:26

On the 2003 re-release, track 4 is listed as "Almost Crimes", track 7 as "Anthems for a Seventeen Year Old Girl" and track 9 as "Late Night Bedroom Rock for the Missionaries".

== Personnel ==
Credits are adapted from the album's liner notes.

Broken Social Scene

- Kevin Drew – performer, keyboards (1, 3, 5, 7, 8, 10, 11, 13), vocals (2, 4, 8, 10–12), backing vocals (3), feedback (3), guitar (4, 6, 8, 13), bass guitar (5), backwards guitar (7), drums (10), piano (11)
- Brendan Canning − performer, double bass (1), bass guitar (2, 4, 7–11, 13), vocals (3), acoustic guitar (3, 6), organ (5, 6), drum programming (9), guitar (11), piano (12), keyboards (12)
- Andrew Whiteman − performer, tres (2), organ (3), guitar (4, 5, 8, 11), vocals (5, 10), bass (6), keyboards (9, 10), tambourine (11)
- Charles Spearin − performer, guitar (2, 9, 10), bass (3, 12), keyboards (4), backwards guitar (5, 12), "belly slap" (5), drum programming (6, 9), harmonica (6), vocal effects (7), acoustic guitar (12), organ (12)
- Justin Peroff − performer, artwork, drums (2−5, 7−13), percussion (6), shaker (11)
- John Crossingham − performer, guitar (2, 9, 10), feedback (3), noises (5), drums (6), bass (7)
- Evan Cranley − performer, trombone (1, 2, 6, 11, 12), "2tar" (3, 4, 8), percussion (5, 6)
- James Shaw − performer, trumpet (2, 6), acoustic guitar (3), guitar (4, 7)
- Feist − performer, vocals (4, 9, 10), backing vocals (5)
- Emily Haines − performer, backing vocals (5), vocals (7)

Additional musicians

- Jessica Moss − violin (2, 7, 13)
- Ohad Benchetrit − flute (6)
- Bill Priddle − guitar (6)
- Brodie West − saxophone (4)
- Susannah Brady − speaking (4)

Production

- David Newfeld − producer, mastering
- Noah Mintz − mastering
- Louise Upperton − layout
