= This Book Is Broken =

2009 book by Stuart Berman

- The cover of This Book Is Broken, 2009.
- Author: Stuart Berman
- Language: English
- Publisher: House of Anansi Press
- Publication date: April 27, 2009
- Publication place: Canada
- Media type: Print (paperback)
- Pages: 168
- ISBN: 978-0-88784-796-7
- OCLC: 198527257

This Book Is Broken is a book written by Eye Weekly editor Stuart Berman about the Toronto indie rock band Broken Social Scene, from its inception to its critical acclaim.

The book was reviewed by the National Post, amNewYork, and the Vancouver Sun. At a debate on the book with the author and members Brendan Canning and Dave Newfeld, Newfeld said that his representation in the book was incorrect; he said, due to its nature as an oral history, "the version told by the most popular person at the party becomes the truth."
