= Let's Try the After (Vol. 1) =

Let's Try the After, Vol. 1

EP by Broken Social Scene
- Released: February 15, 2019
- Length: 19:09
- Label: Arts & Crafts
- Producer: Nyles Spencer

Broken Social Scene chronology
Hug of Thunder (2017)	Let's Try the After, Vol. 1 (2019)	Let's Try the After, Vol. 2 (2019)

Singles from Let's Try the After, Vol. 1
- 1. "All I Want" Released: January 22, 2019

Professional ratings
Aggregate scores
Source	Rating
Metacritic	73/100
Review scores
Source	Rating
AllMusic	3/5 stars
Exclaim!	8/10
NOW	4/5 Ns
Pitchfork	7.2/10
Under the Radar	7.5/10

Let's Try the After, Vol. 1 is an EP by Canadian indie rock band Broken Social Scene. It was released on February 15, 2019 through Arts & Crafts Records.

== Track listing ==
No.	Title	Length
1.	"The Sweet Sea"	0:48
2.	"Remember Me Young"	4:26
3.	"Boyfriends"	5:24
4.	"1972"	4:54
5.	"All I Want"	3:37

== Charts ==
Chart	Peak position
US Independent Albums (Billboard)	27
