= It's All Gonna Break (film) =

2024 documentary film

- Film poster
- Directed by: Stephen Chung
- Written by: Andrea Menzies
- Produced by: Ann Shin; Diana Warme
- Starring: Broken Social Scene
- Cinematography: Stephen Chung
- Edited by: Andrew Beach; Graham Withers
- Music by: Broken Social Scene
- Distributed by: Cargo Films
- Release date: 2024
- Running time: 94 minutes
- Country: Canada
- Language: English

It's All Gonna Break is a 2024 Canadian documentary film about the band Broken Social Scene. The film is executive produced, shot, and directed by Stephen Chung.

== Reception ==
=== Critical response ===
Andrew Parker of TheGATE.ca gave the film a score of 7 out of 10, writing, "There's lots of love in 'It's All Gonna Break', and none of it is of the sappy, saccharine variety. It's just easy-going acceptance and reflection. That might not appeal to the uninitiated, but for fans of Broken Social Scene and their various incarnations, spin-offs, and day jobs, it's quite fitting."

=== Awards ===
Andrew Beach and Graham Withers received a Canadian Screen Award nomination for Best Editing in a Documentary at the 14th Canadian Screen Awards in 2026.
