= Ariel Engle =

- Genres: indie pop indie rock
- Years active: 2000s-present
- Labels: Arts & Crafts Productions

Ariel Engle is a Canadian indie pop singer and songwriter who records and performs as a solo artist and with Broken Social Scene.

Engle first became noted as a guest vocalist on Montag's 2005 album Alone, Not Alone, performing vocals on the track "Grand Luxe". She subsequently appeared as a guest or backing vocalist on recordings by Melissa Auf der Maur, Snowblink, Land of Kush, Plants and Animals, Stars, and Martha Wainwright, before collaborating with her husband, Broken Social Scene's Andrew Whiteman, on the band project AroarA. The band's 2013 EP, In the Pines, is based on the poetry of Alice Notley and was a longlisted nominee for the 2014 Polaris Music Prize.

Following In the Pines, Engle became a member of Broken Social Scene, often serving as a live fill-in vocalist on songs that had been sung on record by Feist, Amy Millan, or Emily Haines. The 2017 album, Hug of Thunder, marked her first recorded appearance on a Broken Social Scene album.

In 2018, Engle launched the solo project La Force. Her self-titled debut album as La Force was released in September 2018 on Arts & Crafts Productions. In the same year, she appeared on Safia Nolin's album Dans le noir as a duet vocalist on the track "Lesbian Break-Up Song". La Force was a longlisted nominee for the 2019 Polaris Music Prize.

She subsequently joined Efrim Menuck in the noise-pop project All Hands Make Light.

XO Skeleton was a longlisted nominee for the 2024 Polaris Music Prize.
