= KC Accidental =

Canadian post-rock band

K.C. Accidental
- Origin: Toronto, Ontario, Canada
- Genres: Post-rock
- Years active: 1998–2000
- Labels: Noise Factory
- Past members: Kevin Drew; Charles Spearin

KC Accidental was a Canadian post-rock band from Toronto, Ontario, Canada. The band released two albums of mostly instrumental music. It later evolved into Broken Social Scene.

== History ==
KC Accidental was formed in 1998, and started out as a two-person recording project consisting of Kevin Drew and Charles Spearin. The "KC" in the band's name was taken from the initials of their first names. The pair began recording in a home studio; their debut album Captured Anthems for an Empty Bathtub was sold by Drew and Spearin exclusively through one shop in 1998 and quickly sold out.

The group released a second album in 2000 entitled Anthems for the Could've Bin Pills on Noise Factory Records. It included contributions from Jason Collett, Evan Cranley, Emily Haines, Jason McKenzie, Jessica Moss, James Payment, Bill Priddle, James Shaw and Justin Small. Many of these musicians went on to work with Drew and Spearin in Broken Social Scene, who released their debut album, Feel Good Lost on Noise Factory in 2001.

As a reference to the earlier group, Broken Social Scene included a song titled "KC Accidental" on its Juno Award-winning album You Forgot It in People.

The two albums by KC Accidental, long time out of print and out of reach, were reissued by Arts & Crafts on 2CD/2LP format and digitally in 2010.

On June 21, 2013, KC Accidental performed a new 15-minute song entitled "Summer Withdrawal" live at Jason Collett's Courtyard Revue in Toronto. It was the first time the band had performed in 13 years. A year later on June 20, 2014, KC Accidental reconvened for a full live show at the North by Northeast festival.

As of 2016, Broken Social Scene continues to perform the song "KC Accidental" in their live shows.

== Members ==
- Kevin Drew (1998–2000)
- Charles Spearin (1998–2000)

== Discography ==
=== Albums ===
- Captured Anthems for an Empty Bathtub - (1998/2003)
- Anthems for the Could've Bin Pills - (2000)

== See also ==
- Music of Canada
- Canadian rock
- List of Canadian musicians
- List of bands from Canada
- Category:Canadian musical groups
