= The Water (2009 film) =

- Directed by: Kevin Drew
- Produced by: Jannie McInnes
- Starring: Cillian Murphy, David Fox, Leslie Feist
- Cinematography: Miroslaw Baszak
- Music by: Feist
- Release date: 2009
- Running time: 16 minutes
- Country: Canada
- Language: English

The Water is a short film directed by Kevin Drew and starring Cillian Murphy, David Fox, and Leslie Feist.

== Synopsis ==
The Water explores the past, present and future of a family over 24 hours. Set in the middle of a cold beautiful winter, it explores the complex and intimate dynamic between loved ones, and loss with regret and anticipation. The story, told like a visual poem, unfolds in silence, in the faces of the characters and in the beauty of music, leaving questions about death, life and love.

== Cast ==
- Cillian Murphy as The Son
- David Fox as The Father
- Leslie Feist as The Mother

== Production ==
The film was shot over a period of two days in January 2008 in Toronto.
