= Captured Anthems for an Empty Bathtub =

Studio album by KC Accidental
- Released: 1998
- Genre: Alternative rock
- Label: Noise Factory

KC Accidental chronology
Captured Anthems for an Empty Bathtub (1998)	Anthems for the Could've Bin Pills (2000)

Captured Anthems for an Empty Bathtub is an album by KC Accidental, self-released in 1998 and re-released in 2003 on Noise Factory Records.

== Track listing ==
All songs by Kevin Drew and Charles Spearin. Only the first six songs listed below were on the original 1998 edition of the album, with the last six having been released the following year on Anthems for the Could've Bin Pills, with the two albums released together only at the time of the reissue.

1. "Nancy and the Girdle Boy" - 5:00
2. "Something for Chicago" - 2:13
3. "Anorexic He-Man" - 6:42
4. "Save the Last Breath" - 9:00
5. "Kev's Message for Charlie" - 4:10
6. "Tired Hands" - 12:25
7. "Instrumental Died in the Bathtub and Took the Daydreams With It" - 8:53
8. "Residential Love Song" - 4:56
9. "Silverfish Eyelashes" - 8:45
10. "Ruined in ‘84" - 3:11
11. "Them (Pop Song #3333)" - 7:12
12. "Is And Of The" - 12:43
