= Something for All of Us... =

Studio album by Brendan Canning
- Released: July 22, 2008
- Genre: Indie rock; art rock
- Length: 48:06
- Label: Arts & Crafts

Brendan Canning chronology
Spirit If... (2007)	Something for All of Us... (2008)	Forgiveness Rock Record (2010)

Professional ratings
Review scores
Source	Rating
AllMusic	3.5/5 stars
Eye Weekly	3/5 stars
Pitchfork Media	(7.5/10)
The Skinny	2/5 stars

Something for All of Us... is the first solo album by the Broken Social Scene co-founder Brendan Canning. The album is the second in a series entitled Broken Social Scene Presents:, each album in the series being a particular member's solo efforts, assisted by fellow Broken Social Scene members — the first being Kevin Drew's Spirit If....

"Hit the Wall" is the album's first single and was made available as a free download on the Arts & Crafts website on May 5, 2008. The album was released to retail on July 22, 2008. Due to the leak of an unmastered version in mid-June, Canning released the album as a digital download.

The album was generally warmly received. The album currently has a score of 70 out of 100 on Metacritic with praise from The Boston Globe, Billboard, No Ripcord, Almost Cool and Delusions of Adequacy. The album sold fairly well, reaching #17 on the Billboard Top Heatseekers chart.

== Track listing ==
1. "Something for All of Us" – 5:34
2. "Chameleon" – 4:52
3. "Hit the Wall" – 4:51
4. "Snowballs & Icicles" – 2:49
5. "Churches Under the Stairs" – 4:20
6. "Love Is New" – 4:07
7. "Antique Bull" – 3:43
8. "All the Best Wooden Toys Come from Germany" – 2:53
9. "Possible Grenade" – 4:40
10. "Been at It So Long" – 5:09
11. "Take Care, Look Up" – 5:17
12. "Don't Pull the Strings Back" (iTunes bonus track) – 4:46

== Music videos ==
- "Hit the Wall"
- "Churches Under the Stairs"
- "Love Is New"
