= Bee Hives =

Compilation album by Broken Social Scene
- Released: March 24, 2004
- Recorded: June 2001–October 2003
- Genres: Ambient; post-rock; baroque pop; dream pop
- Length: 48:57
- Label: Arts & Crafts
- Producers: Ohad Benchetrit, Dave Newfeld, Richard Woodcraft

Broken Social Scene chronology
You Forgot It in People (2002)	Bee Hives (2004)	Broken Social Scene (2005)

Professional ratings
Aggregate scores
Source	Rating
Metacritic	70/100
Review scores
Source	Rating
AllMusic	4/5 stars
DIY	3/5 stars
Pitchfork	(5.6/10)
Spin	B+
Tiny Mix Tapes	4/5 stars

Bee Hives is a 2004 album by Canadian indie rock group Broken Social Scene. It is a collection of B-sides from their second full-length, You Forgot It in People.

The working title for the album was Death Is a B-Side. Cover art for this title can be found in the book This Book Is Broken.

== Critical reception ==
Bee Hives was met with "generally favorable" reviews from critics. At Metacritic, which assigns a weighted average rating out of 100 to reviews from mainstream publications, the release received an average score of 70, based on 14 reviews.

== Track listing ==
No.	Title	Length
1.	"(untitled - intro)"	0:37
2.	"Market Fresh"	3:57
3.	"Weddings"	7:02
4.	"hHallmark"^{1}"	3:53
5.	"Backyards"	8:14
6.	"Da Da Da Da"	7:09
7.	"Ambulance for the Ambience"	5:18
8.	"Time = Cause"	5:07
9.	"Lover's Spit"^{2}"	7:34

== Notes ==
^{1} The song title "hHallmark" is not a typographical error. The extra "h" is an allusion to Brendan Canning's prior band, hHead.

^{2} Feist contributed vocals to the single "Lover's Spit" as a B-side.
