= Feel Good Lost =

Studio album by Broken Social Scene
- Released: March 6, 2001
- Recorded: January–February 2001
- Genres: Post-rock, ambient, indie rock
- Length: 59:38
- Labels: Noise Factory, Arts & Crafts

Broken Social Scene chronology
Feel Good Lost (2001)	You Forgot It in People (2002)

Professional ratings
Review scores
Source	Rating
AllMusic	4/5 stars
Pitchfork	7.5/10

Feel Good Lost is the debut studio album by Broken Social Scene. It was written and recorded primarily by founding members Kevin Drew and Brendan Canning. Unlike their better known 2002 outing You Forgot It in People, Feel Good Lost is mostly an instrumental, post-rock, ambient album, closer in style to BSS predecessor band KC Accidental, although it does feature some vocals by Leslie Feist and Kevin Drew.

== Track listing ==
All songs written by Brendan Canning and Kevin Drew.

No.	Title	Length
1.	"I Slept with Bonhomme at the CBC"	5:26
2.	"Guilty Cubicles"	3:03
3.	"Love and Mathematics"	5:44
4.	"Passport Radio"	5:45
5.	"Alive in 85"	5:14
6.	"Prison Province"	1:42
7.	"Blues for Uncle Gibb"	6:59
8.	"Stomach Song"	4:29
9.	"Mossbraker"	5:33
10.	"Feel Good Lost"	1:51
11.	"Last Place"	8:26
12.	"Cranley's Gonna Make It"	5:26
