= John Crossingham =

- Origin: Toronto, Ontario, Canada
- Genres: Indie rock
- Occupation: Singer-songwriter
- Instrument: Vocals

John Crossingham is a Canadian indie rock singer-songwriter based in Toronto, Ontario. He performs with the bands Raising the Fawn and Broken Social Scene.
