= Brendan Canning =

Canadian indie rock performer

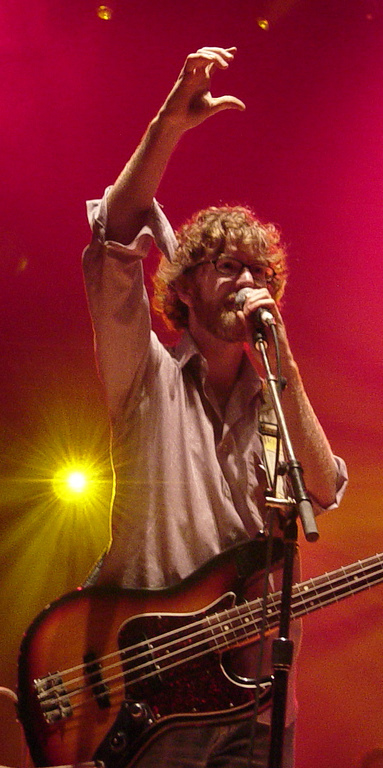
- Performing with Broken Social Scene at the Olympic Island Festival in 2006.

Background information
- Born: 1969 (age 56–57)
- Origin: Ajax, Ontario, Canada
- Genre: Indie rock
- Instruments: Bass guitar, guitar, vocals, keyboards
- Years active: 1992–present
- Labels: Arts & Crafts, Draper Street Records
- Website: brendancanning.com

Brendan Canning (born September 6th, 1969) is a Canadian indie rock performer. He is a founding member of the band Broken Social Scene and a former member of By Divine Right, Blurtonia, Valley of the Giants, Len, and hHead.

== Career ==
Canning began performing in the 1990s, singing and playing guitar, bass and keyboards in several local bands, including hHead and By Divine Right. In 1999, he and Kevin Drew founded Broken Social Scene, and the band recorded five albums. In 2002, Canning was part of the band Valley of the Giants.

In July 2008, Canning released a solo album called Something for All of Us..., the second release in the "Broken Social Scene Presents" series. The first single from the album is titled "Hit the Wall" and was released on May 5, 2008.

In 2009, Canning took part in an interactive documentary series called City Sonic, which featured 20 artists from the Toronto area. Canning talked about his connection to the Drake Hotel. Canning was also featured in the 2010 Prairie Coast Films documentary Open Your Mouth And Say... Mr. Chi Pig, a film directed by Sean Patrick Shaul about the life of Mr. Chi Pig of the band SNFU.

On June 12, 2012, Canning's new band, Cookie Duster, released their debut album entitled When Flying Was Easy. Shortly thereafter, Canning wrote the score for the 2013 film, The Canyons.

On October 1, 2013, Canning released his second solo album, You Gots 2 Chill, the first to be released on his own record label Draper Street Records. The title of the album is a reference to the EPMD song "You Gots to Chill". The first single, "Plugged In", was released as a free download. Soon after the album was released he embarked on a North American tour with fellow Toronto band Dinosaur Bones, which included a show at hometown venue Lee's Palace.

Canning signed Vancouver native Rosie June as the first artist to Draper Street Records. The label released her debut album Listening Post in June, 2014. Canning's last album, Home Wrecking Years, was released in August 2016; it includes cameos by Justin Peroff and Sam Goldberg from Broken Social Scene.

== Discography ==
=== Solo ===
- Something for All of Us (2008)
- You Gots 2 Chill (2013)
- Home Wrecking Years (2016)

=== hHead ===
- Fireman (1992)
- Jerk (1994)
- Ozzy (1996)

=== By Divine Right ===
- Bless This Mess (1999)

=== Broken Social Scene ===
- Feel Good Lost (2001)
- You Forgot It In People (2002)
- Bee Hives (2003)
- Broken Social Scene (2005)
- Forgiveness Rock Record (2010)
- Hug of Thunder (2017)
- Remember the Humans (2026)

=== Valley of the Giants ===
- Valley of the Giants (2004)

=== Cookie Duster ===
- When Flying Was Easy (2012)
