= Forgiveness Rock Record =

Studio album by Broken Social Scene
- Released: May 4, 2010
- Genres: Indie rock, baroque pop
- Length: 63:31
- Label: Arts & Crafts
- Producer: John McEntire

Broken Social Scene chronology
Something for All of Us... (2008)	Forgiveness Rock Record (2010)	Hug of Thunder (2017)

Singles from Forgiveness Rock Record
- 1. "Forced to Love / All Is All" Released: 2010; 2. "World Sick" Released: 2011; 3. "Texico Bitches" Released: 2011

Professional ratings
Review scores
Source	Rating
Allmusic	4/5 stars
BBC	(mixed)
BLARE Magazine	4.5/5 stars
The Guardian	4/5 stars
Pitchfork Media	(8.3/10)
PopMatters	9/10 stars
The Skinny	5/5 stars
Snob's Music	(8.5/10)
Spin	3.5/5 stars
Sputnikmusic	4/5 stars

Forgiveness Rock Record is the fourth studio album by Canadian indie rock musical collective Broken Social Scene, released by the Arts & Crafts record label on May 4, 2010. The critically acclaimed album, produced by John McEntire of the bands Tortoise and The Sea and Cake, features guest appearances by Scott Kannberg from Pavement, Sebastien Grainger of Death from Above 1979, and Sam Prekop also of The Sea and Cake.

The album was a shortlisted nominee for the 2010 Polaris Music Prize.

== Track listing ==
No.	Title	Length
1.	"World Sick"	6:47
2.	"Chase Scene"	3:31
3.	"Texico Bitches"	3:49
4.	"Forced to Love"	3:34
5.	"All to All"	4:49
6.	"Art House Director"	3:32
7.	"Highway Slipper Jam"	4:26
8.	"Ungrateful Little Father"	6:41
9.	"Meet Me in the Basement"	3:43
10.	"Sentimental X's"	5:40
11.	"Sweetest Kill"	5:09
12.	"Romance to the Grave"	4:47
13.	"Water in Hell"	4:25
14.	"Me and My Hand"	2:05

== Lo-Fi for the Dividing Nights ==
Lo-Fi for the Dividing Nights is an EP that was available as a digital download with pre-orders of Forgiveness Rock Record. It was also available as a promo CD with purchases of Forgiveness Rock Record at some record stores in Canada and the U.S.

No.	Title	Length
1.	"New Instructions"	1:42
2.	"Sudden Foot Loss"	2:37
3.	"Shabba Lights"	1:31
4.	"Song for Dee"	2:06
5.	"Eling's Haus"	1:40
6.	"Professor Sambo"	2:32
7.	"Never Felt Alive"	1:52
8.	"Paperweight Room"	1:54
9.	"Turbo Mouse"	2:09
10.	"Far Out"	3:41

== Charts ==
Chart performance
Chart (2010)	Peak position
Australian Hitseekers Albums (ARIA)	12
Canadian Albums (Billboard)	1
Irish Albums (IRMA)	58
Irish Independent Albums (IRMA)	5
Scottish Albums (Official Charts)	73
UK Albums (Official Charts)	67
US Billboard 200	34
US Independent Albums (Billboard)	5
US Indie Store Album Sales (Billboard)	3
US Top Alternative Albums (Billboard)	6
US Top Rock Albums (Billboard)	9
