= Andrew Whiteman =

Canadian musician and songwriter

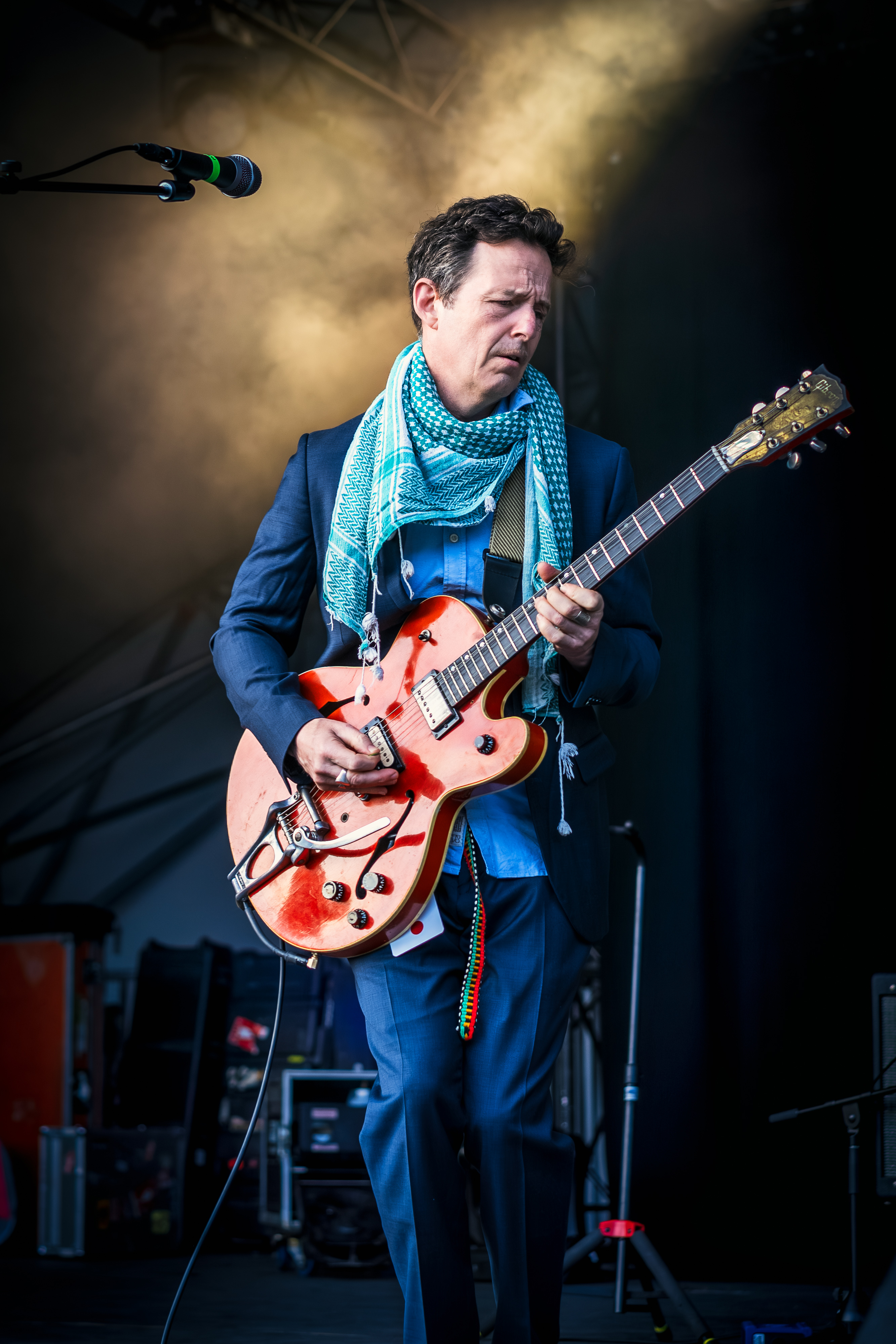
- Andrew Whiteman performing with Broken Social Scene at Ottawa Jazz Festival, 2025

Background information
- Born: David Andrew Patrick Whiteman
- Origin: Toronto, Ontario, Canada
- Instruments: Guitar, bass guitar
- Member of: Broken Social Scene
- Spouse: Ariel Engle

David Andrew Patrick Whiteman is a Canadian musician and songwriter. Forming the Bourbon Tabernacle Choir in Toronto out of high school, he eventually left the band in 1993 after eight years. Whiteman went on to record Fear of Zen in 1995 with the band Que Vida! Whiteman fronts the band Apostle of Hustle with bassist Julian Brown and drummer Dean Stone.

Leslie Feist subsequently invited Whiteman to collaborate with Brendan Canning, Kevin Drew, Justin Peroff and herself—then essentially the core members of Broken Social Scene. The chemistry was successful and Whiteman became one of the band's four members to consistently appear in every tour.

Whiteman also collaborated with his wife, singer Ariel Engle, in the band AroarA, which released the EP In the Pines in 2013. The EP, based on the poetry of Alice Notley, was a longlisted nominee for the 2014 Polaris Music Prize.

== See also ==
- List of Canadian musicians
- Music of Canada
- Rock music of Canada
