= Broken Social Scene =

Canadian indie rock band

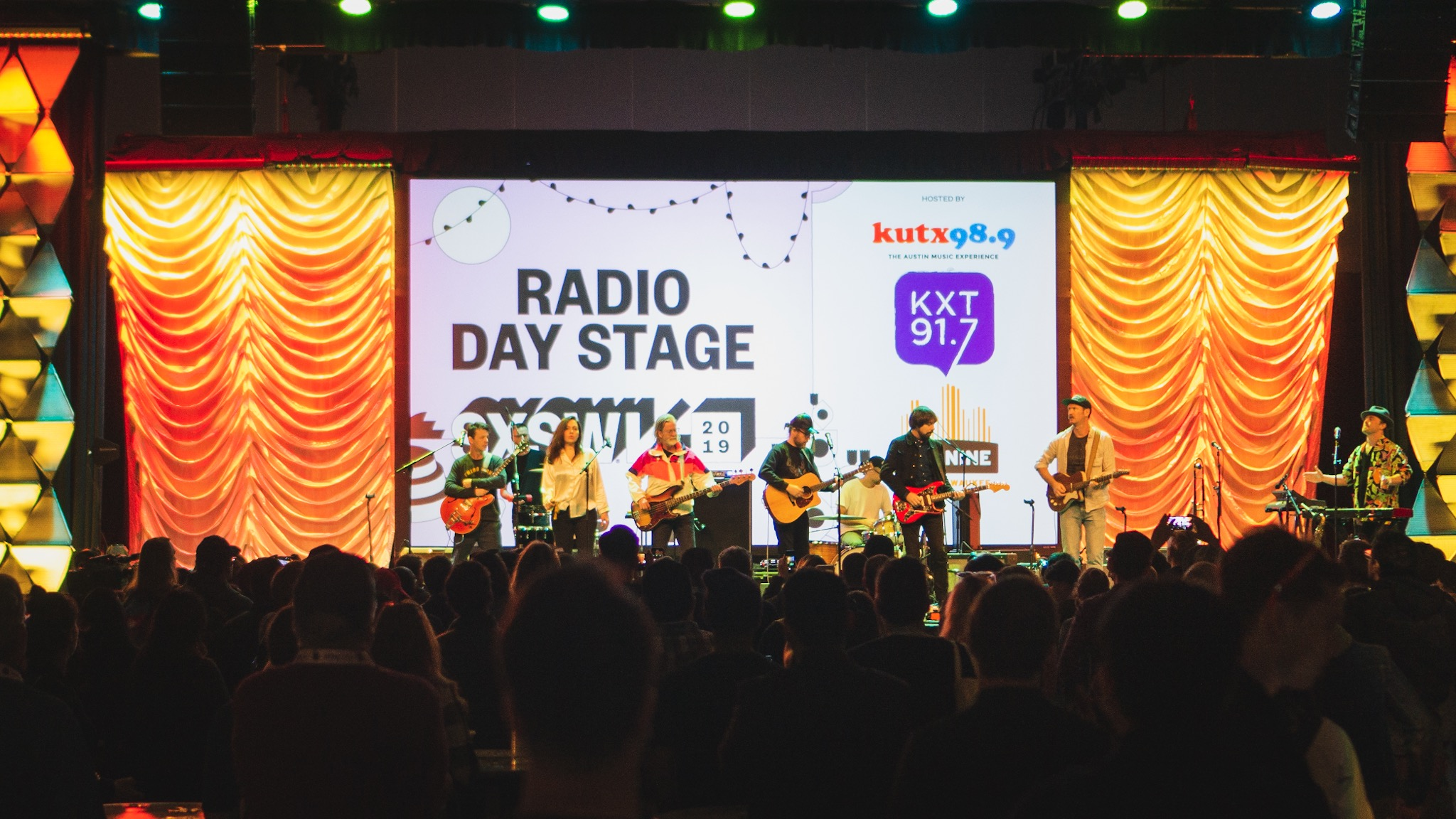
- Broken Social Scene in 2019

Background information
- Origin: Toronto, Ontario, Canada
- Genres: Indie rock; post-rock; experimental pop; baroque pop; indie pop
- Years active: 1999–present
- Label: Arts & Crafts
- Members: See Members
- Website: brokensocialscene.ca

Broken Social Scene is a Canadian indie rock band and musical collective including as few as six and as many as 19 members, formed by Kevin Drew (vocals, guitar) and Brendan Canning (vocals, bass) in 1999. Alongside Drew and Canning, the other core members of the band are Justin Peroff (drums), Andrew Whiteman (guitar) and Charles Spearin (guitar). Other longtime members and collaborators include Evan Cranley (trombone, guitar), Sam Goldberg (guitar), James Shaw (trumpet, various instruments) and David French (saxophone, flute). Vocalists Leslie Feist, Emily Haines, Amy Millan, Lisa Lobsinger and Ariel Engle have made significant contributions to the band's studio albums and live performances across its career.

Most of its members play in various other groups and solo projects, mainly in the city of Toronto. These associated acts include Metric, Feist, Stars, Apostle of Hustle, Do Make Say Think, KC Accidental, Emily Haines & The Soft Skeleton and Jason Collett. The group's sound combines elements of all of its members' respective musical projects, and is occasionally considered baroque pop. It includes orchestrations featuring guitars, horns, woodwinds, and violins, unusual song structures, and an experimental, sometimes chaotic production style from band member David Newfeld, who produced the band's second, third and sixth albums.

The band has released six studio albums to date: Feel Good Lost (2001), You Forgot It in People (2002), Broken Social Scene (2005), Forgiveness Rock Record (2010), Hug of Thunder (2017) and Remember the Humans (2026), alongside various EPs, compilations and companion albums.

Stuart Berman's This Book Is Broken (2009) covers the band from its inception to its critical acclaim. In 2010, Bruce McDonald made This Movie Is Broken, a movie about the band's Harbourfront show during the 2009 Toronto strike. In 2024, cinematographer Stephen Chung collaborated with his longtime friends in the band to complete and release the film It's All Gonna Break, a project he had set aside in 2007, using new as well as historical footage he had filmed throughout the band's career.

The collective and their respective projects have had a broad influence on alternative music and indie rock during the early 21st century; in 2021, Pitchfork listed the band among the "most important artists" of the last 25 years.

== History ==
=== 1999–2001: Feel Good Lost ===
The band was formed in 1999 by core members Kevin Drew and Brendan Canning. This duo recorded and released the band's ambient debut album, Feel Good Lost, on Noise Factory Records in 2001, with contributions by Justin Peroff, Charles Spearin, Bill Priddle, Leslie Feist, Jessica Moss and Stars' Evan Cranley.

Drew and Canning's material at the time was almost entirely instrumental, so they brought together musicians from the Toronto indie scene, the album contributors as well as Andrew Whiteman, Jason Collett, and Metric's Emily Haines, to flesh out their live show with lyrics and vocals. Over time, the band came to include contributions from James Shaw, Justin Peroff, John Crossingham, and Stars member Amy Millan.

=== 2002–2004: You Forgot It in People ===
All of the musicians from the live show joined Drew, Canning, Peroff and Spearin to record the band's second album, You Forgot It in People. The album was produced by David Newfeld and released on Paper Bag Records in October 2002 and won the Alternative Album of the Year Juno Award in 2003. The album also included musical contributions by Priddle, Jessica Moss, Brodie West, Susannah Brady and Ohad Benchetrit, but these were credited as supporting musicians rather than band members. On the supporting tour, the core band consisted of Drew, Canning, Peroff, Whiteman and Jason Collett, along whichever band members were available on each show date.

In 2004, the B-sides and remix collection Bee Hives was released.

Broken Social Scene's song "Lover's Spit" from 2002's You Forgot It in People has been featured in director Clément Virgo's movie Lie with Me (2005), Paul McGuigan's Wicker Park (2004), Bruce McDonald's The Love Crimes of Gillian Guess (2004), Showtime's Queer as Folk (2003) and the penultimate episode of the Canadian series Terminal City (2005). The version of "Lover's Spit" found on 2004's Bee Hives record was also featured in an episode of the third season of the FX series Nip/Tuck. Showtime's television program The L Word featured "Pacific Theme" and "Looks Just Like the Sun", both from You Forgot It in People, in the show's first season. "Lover's Spit" is referenced in the 2013 Lorde song, "Ribs". "Looks Just Like the Sun" was featured in the 2006 film Swedish Auto. "Stars and Sons" from You Forgot It in People also appeared in the movie The Invisible. Music from the band's albums was used to score the 2006 film Half Nelson.

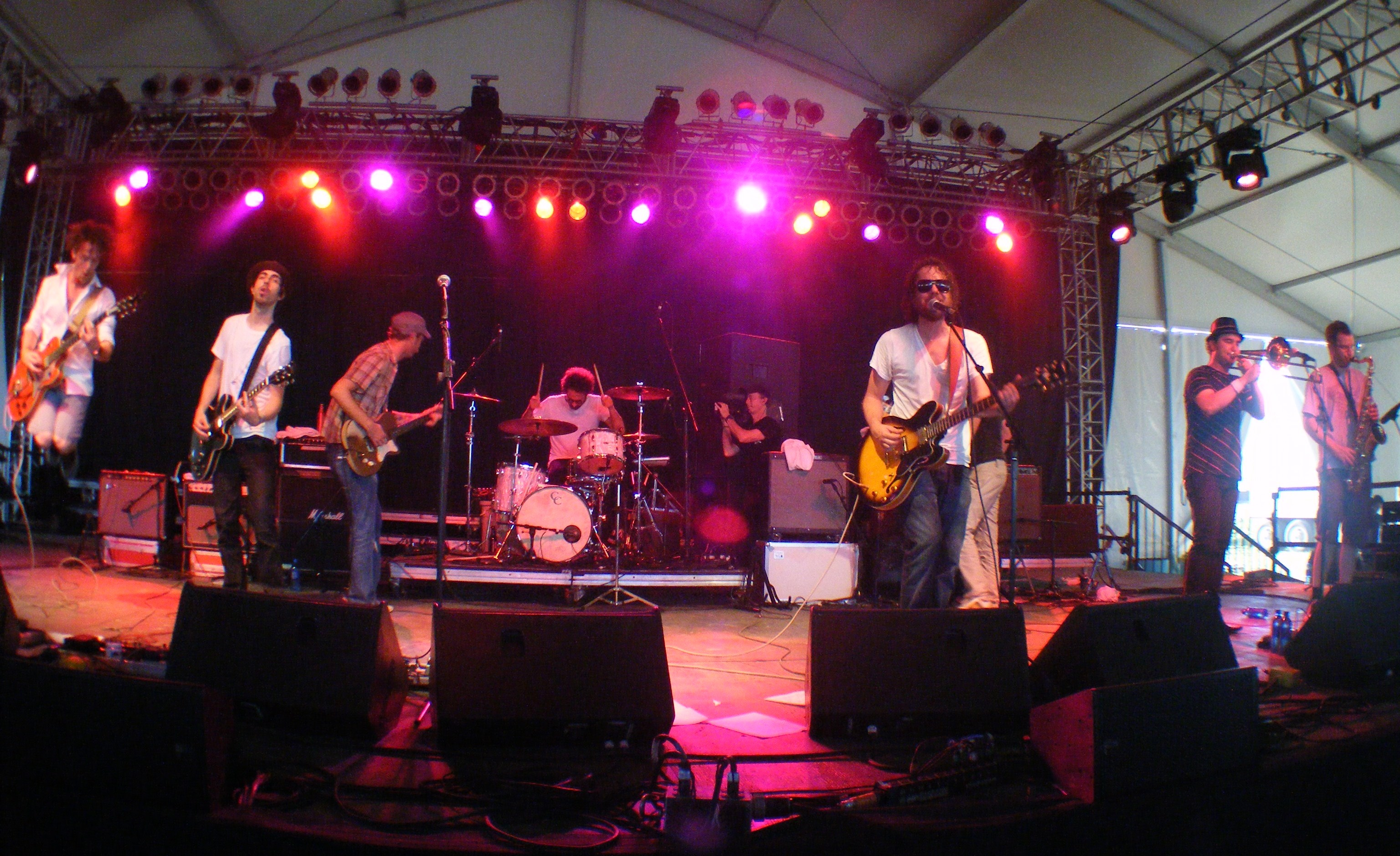
Broken Social Scene at the Bonnaroo Music & Arts Festival in Manchester, Tennessee.

=== 2005–2007: Broken Social Scene ===
Broken Social Scene released their third full-length album, Broken Social Scene, also produced by Newfeld, in October 2005, with new contributors including k-os, Jason Tait and Murray Lightburn. New band members were Newfeld and Torquil Campbell, who were members of the band Stars. A limited edition EP, EP to Be You and Me was also printed along with the album.

Broken Social Scene performed "7/4 (Shoreline)" on Late Night with Conan O'Brien on January 31, 2006, and that year they performed "Ibi Dreams of Pavement" at the 2006 Juno Awards, at which their self-titled album won the Alternative Album of the Year award. In August the band went on a European tour. Returning in September, they were last-minute replacement performers at North America's first Virgin Festival, at Toronto Islands Park after headliners Massive Attack cancelled due to problems involving obtaining US visas. The band quickly assembled to play a one-hour closing performance on the main stage, following The Strokes and The Raconteurs. Through the performance the band was joined by Feist, Amy Millan of Stars, k-os, and Emily Haines of Metric. This was the last show featuring the entire 15 member line-up of the band until 2009.

After a US tour in November, the band went on hiatus while members worked on their other projects. In late 2006, several members of the band appeared as special guests on The Stars and Suns Sessions, the second album from Mexican indie band Chikita Violenta. The album was produced by Dave Newfeld.

In May 2008, the band contributed a T-shirt design for the Yellow Bird Project to raise money and awareness for the Lake Ontario Waterkeeper. The shirt was designed by their drummer, Justin Peroff, and bears the slogan "Hope for Truth".

Members of Broken Social Scene composed and recorded an original score for director Marc Evans's film Snow Cake, as well as scored his 2007 film adaptation of Maureen Medved's novel, The Tracey Fragments. In 2009, Bruce McDonald directed a short documentary episode of IFC's The Rawside Of... that focused on the making of Brendan Canning's solo album Something for All of Us.

=== 2007–2008: Broken Social Scene Presents... ===
In June 2007, BSS founder Kevin Drew began recording an album which featured many members of Broken Social Scene. The album was produced by Ohad Benchetrit and Charles Spearin and was titled Broken Social Scene presents ..Spirit If.... The album was recorded throughout 2004 and 2006 in Ohad Benchetrit's house while the band was not on tour. Although billed as a solo project, most Broken Social Scene members make cameo appearances. The sound itself is Broken Social Scene's familiar mix of rough and ragged, sad and celebratory, with psychedelic swells and acoustic jangles. Also featured are Dinosaur Jr.'s J Mascis and Canadian rock icon Tom Cochrane playing and singing and handclapping along. The album was released on September 18, 2007, and a tour billed as Broken Social Scene Performs Kevin Drew's Spirit If... took place in late 2007.

The second "Broken Social Scene presents..." record, by Brendan Canning, is entitled Something for All of Us and was released on Arts & Crafts in July 2008. Broken Social Scene also took part in the 2008 Siren Music Festival in Coney Island, Brooklyn.

=== 2009–2012: Forgiveness Rock Record and Lo-Fi for the Dividing Nights ===
On April 29, 2009, Kevin Drew and Brendan Canning guest-hosted 102.1 The Edge's program The Indie Hour to promote their concert at the Olympic Island Festival. The festival was later moved to Harbourfront Centre after a labour dispute resulted in the suspension of ferry service to the Toronto Islands.

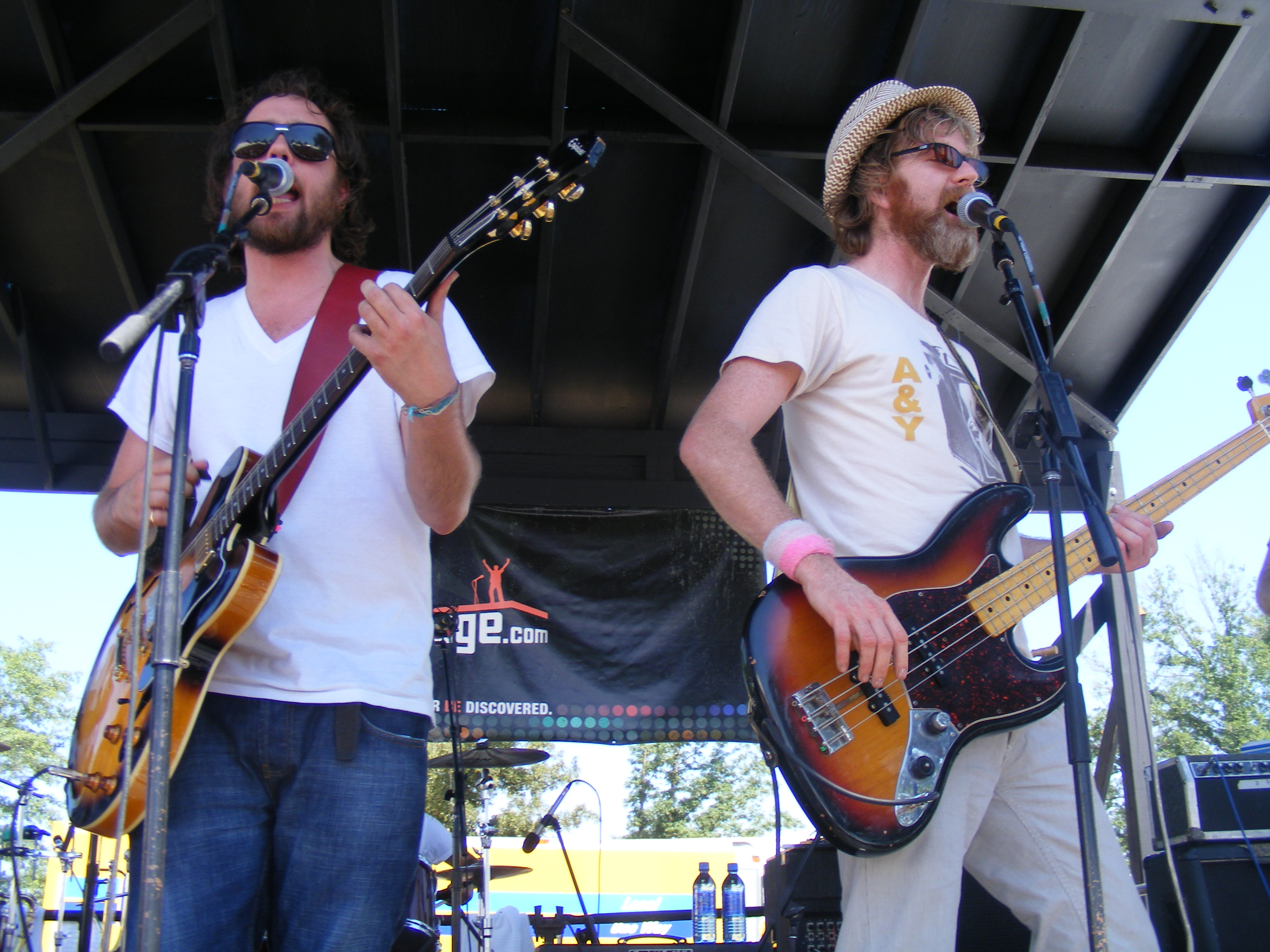
The founders of Broken Social Scene, Kevin Drew and Brendan Canning.

In May 2009 Arts & Crafts, with association from Anansi Press, released This Book Is Broken written by The Grid editor Stuart Berman, who had a close personal involvement with the band. The book includes artwork, concert posters and photographs (professional and amateur) of the band. Berman includes extensive interviews with band members and related persons, arranged by subject and chronology.

In June 2009, the band played a short set to launch This Book Is Broken at the North by Northeast festival. They played a mix of new songs from their then-upcoming album and old favourites, and were joined by Feist, who also joined them on their second visit to Mexico City in October.

During the band's free performance at the Harbourfront Centre on July 11, 2009, they were joined by nearly all past contributors, including Feist, Emily Haines and James Shaw, Amy Millan and Evan Cranley, John Crossingham, Jason Collett and Julie Penner. This revue-like show celebrated other projects by members as well as including material from the then-upcoming album. Emcee Bruce McDonald announced the filming of a documentary directed by him and written by Don McKellar, Titled This Movie Is Broken, it includes concert footage and a fictional romance. Although McDonald announced at the concert that film submitted by fans would be used in the movie, the final cut of the movie included only one submission, a front-row recording of "Major Label Debut".

Broken Social Scene released their fourth full-length album on May 4, 2010. Entitled Forgiveness Rock Record, it was recorded at Soma in Chicago, with John McEntire producing, and in Toronto at the studio of Sebastian Grainger and James Shaw. For the first time, Amy Millan, Emily Haines, and Leslie Feist recorded a track together (albeit at different times). This album was short-listed for the 2010 Polaris Music Prize.

In August 2010, Broken Social Scene initiated their "All to All" remix series, which included seven different versions of the track from Forgiveness Rock Record. Every Monday a new remix was released and available for 24 hours via a different online partner. The first version, "All to All (Sebastien Sexy Legs Grainger Remix)", by Sebastien Grainger, was released August 9 via Pitchfork.

During the recording of Forgiveness Rock Record, the group also worked on tracks for Lo-Fi for the Dividing Nights while in Chicago. While John McEntire worked in the main room, during downtime band members would head into Soma's second smaller studio (B-Room) to test out and record new ideas and overdubs. One of their collaborations, "Me & My Hand", ended up being the closing song on Forgiveness Rock Record; the rest became the beginnings of the later album.

=== 2011–2014: Hiatus and the Broken Social Scene Story Project ===
In October 2011 the band put on a show featuring Isaac Brock and went on a fall tour in support of TV on the Radio. After their concert in November in Rio de Janeiro, the band took a long break from performing until 2013, when they headlined the Field Trip Arts & Crafts Music Festival, celebrating tenth anniversary of their label Arts & Crafts.

The band appeared on a number of compilation albums released in 2013, including Arts & Crafts: 2003−2013 ("7/4 (Shoreline)", "Lover's Spit" and "Deathcock"), Arts & Crafts: X ("Day of the Kid") and Sing Me the Songs: Celebrating the Works of Kate McGarrigle ("Mother Mother").

In 2013, publisher House of Anansi teamed with several members of Broken Social Scene to sponsor the Broken Social Scene short story contest. Authors were challenged to create works inspired by the individual tracks of Broken Social Scene's breakthrough album, You Forgot It in People. From the over four hundred submissions, thirteen finalists were chosen, one for each track of the album. Their stories were published in the anthology The Broken Social Scene Story Project: Short Works Inspired by You Forgot It in People.

The thirteen finalists were:

- Sheila Toller (Toronto), "Capture the Flag"
- Morgan Murray (St. John's), "KC Accidental"
- Tom Halford (St. John's), "Stars and Sons"
- Hollie Adams (Calgary), "Almost Crimes (Radio Kills Remix)"
- Jesse McLean (Toronto), "Looks Just Like the Sun"
- Shari Kasman (Toronto), "Pacific Theme"
- Caitlin Galway (Toronto), "Anthems for a Seventeen-Year-Old Girl"
- Jane Ozkowski (Toronto), "Cause=Time"
- Eliza Robertson (Victoria), "Late Nineties Bedroom Rock for the Missionaries"
- Marisa Gelfusa (Toronto), "Shampoo Suicide"
- Meghan Doraty (Calgary), "Lover's Spit"
- Zoe Whittall (Toronto), "I'm Still Your Fag"
- Marcia Walker (Toronto), "Pitter Patter Goes My Heart"

=== 2015–2018: Hug of Thunder ===
The band began to play occasional festivals in 2015 and 2016, including a performance at the Electric Arena in September 2016. They released "Halfway Home", the first single from their new album, on March 30, 2017.

On March 30, 2017, they appeared on the Late Show with Stephen Colbert as musical guests and performed "Halfway Home". Emily Haines and James Shaw of Metric, and Amy Millan and Evan Cranley of Stars joined the band for the performance.

The album, Hug of Thunder, was released July 7, 2017.

On May 15, 2017, the band shared the title track with vocals from Leslie Feist. On May 31, 2017, the band released "Skyline", the album's third preview single. On June 26, 2017, the band released the album's fourth and final preview track "Stay Happy", which features new member Ariel Engle on lead vocals.

Broken Social Scene began a tour of Europe and North America in May 2017, which concluded in fall 2017.

=== 2019–2025: Let's Try the After, Old Dead Young and It's All Gonna Break ===
On January 22, 2019, the band released the single "All I Want" and the details of an EP titled Let's Try the After, Vol. 1 which was released February 15, 2019. A follow-up EP, Let's Try the After, Vol 2, was released April 12, 2019, on Arts & Crafts. Its first single was "Can't Find My Heart". The two EPs were collated into a full-length release, Let's Try the After, which was released as a limited edition twelve-inch record for Record Store Day.

In January 2022, the band released a b-sides and rarities collection entitled Old Dead Young. Upon the album's release, Brendan Canning noted: "I’m happy we’re able to put out some of these tunes, where you listen back and say, 'You know what, this easily could have been an A-side.' I’m just happy to clear out the closet, as it were."

Between 2022 and 2023, the band embarked on a twentieth anniversary tour celebrating their second studio album, You Forgot It in People. Reflecting on the tour, Canning stated: "I’m just thankful that we’re out here and getting to play shows and talk to people who have enjoyed our music over the years. I’ve been granted another gift by getting to go on the road with my band. [...] We’ve always had a family ethos to the group, and it’s been a very positive tour for the band—more than a lot of tours in recent memory. It’s a slightly different lineup we’re going out with: a different drummer, a different lead female vocalist [Jill Harris]. There’s a certain freshness to that, but at the same time, we’re playing these songs we’ve been playing for twenty years now. But it feels good that people are coming out to the gig. We’re delighted by all that."

It's All Gonna Break, a documentary film about the band, premiered in 2024 before going into commercial release in January 2025. Discussing the film, Kevin Drew noted, "It changed my perspective on the band because I forgot all that we did together. You could see the love was there and you could see the intention was there and you could see it was all for the right reasons. There was no fear back then towards vulnerability. In fact, vulnerability was part of our success."

=== 2026–present: Remember the Humans ===
The band released its first studio album in nine years, Remember the Humans, on May 8, 2026 on Arts & Crafts. The album was produced by David Newfeld, who had previously worked with the band on You Forgot It in People (2002) and Broken Social Scene (2005), and includes new collaborator Hannah Georgas.

The album will be accompanied by a co-headling tour with Metric and Stars, named "All the Feelings Tour".

== Band members ==
=== Current active members ===
- Brendan Canning – lead vocals, bass guitar, guitar, keyboards, various instruments (1999–present)
- Kevin Drew – lead vocals, guitar, bass guitar, keyboards, various instruments (1999–present)
- Justin Peroff – drums, percussion (1999–present)
- Charles Spearin – guitars, keyboards, various instruments (2001–present)
- Andrew Whiteman – guitars, keyboards, various instruments (2001–present)
- Evan Cranley – trombone, guitar (2001–2004; 2008–2010; 2015–present)
- James Shaw – trumpet, various instruments (2004; 2007; 2009–2010; 2016–present)
- Sam Goldberg – guitar, various instruments (2007–2010; 2016–present)
- David French – saxophone, flute (2010; 2016–present)
- Jill Harris – lead vocals (2022–present)
- Hannah Georgas – lead vocals (2026–present)

=== Inactive members and collaborators ===
- Emily Haines – vocals (2001–2005; 2009; 2017)
- Amy Millan – vocals (2001–2006; 2009; 2017; 2022; 2026)
- Brodie West – saxophone (2001)
- Bill Priddle – guitars (2001–2002; 2007)
- Ohad Benchetrit – guitars, flute (2002–2006; 2009–2010; 2016–2017; 2026)
- Jason Collett – guitars (2002–2005; 2008–2009)
- Leslie Feist – vocals (2002–2005; 2009; 2017; 2026)
- Angus Pauls (2003)
- Dave Hodge – trombone (2005–2006; 2008–2010)
- Lisa Lobsinger – vocals (2005–2010; 2026)
- Julie Penner – violin (2005–2006)
- Ariel Engle – lead vocals (2016–2020; 2026)

=== Touring line-up history ===
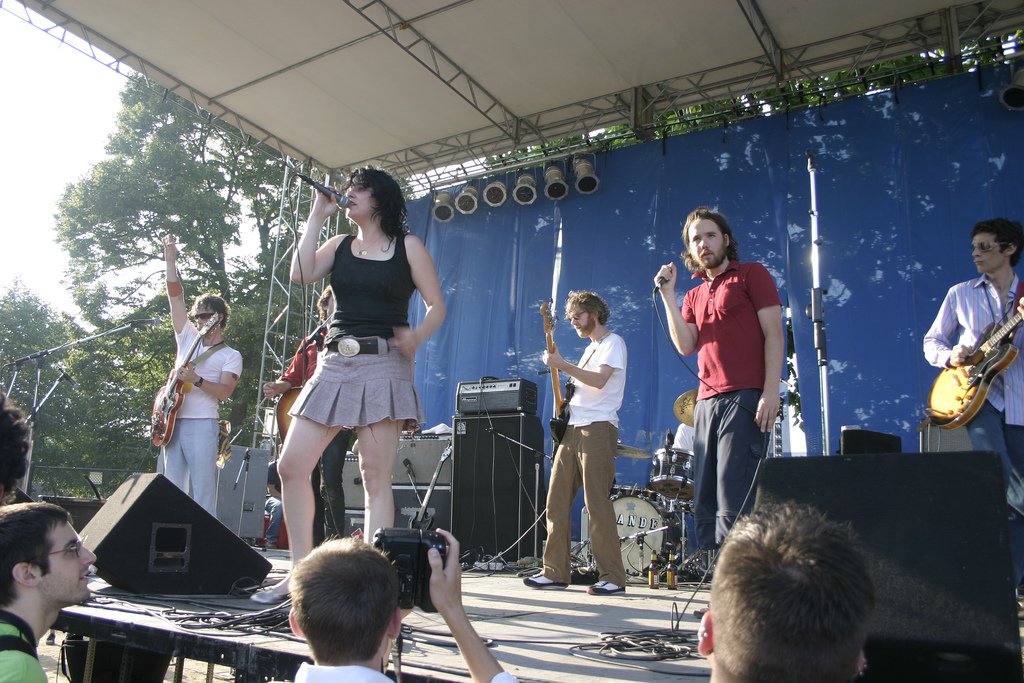
Broken Social Scene performing at the Intonation Music Festival, July 16, 2005, fronted by Amy Millan.

From 2002 to 2004 female vocalists Emily Haines, Leslie Feist, and Amy Millan rotated between availability from their own bands, until a full-time replacement was found in 2005 with Lisa Lobsinger. From time to time (mostly at hometown shows in Toronto) one of the women may without prior announcement resume their role on their trademark songs.

- 2001: Kevin Drew, Brendan Canning, Brodie West.
- 2002: Kevin Drew, Brendan Canning, Justin Peroff, Andrew Whiteman, Charles Spearin, Jason Collett, Evan Cranley, Leslie Feist, Emily Haines.
- 2003: Kevin Drew, Brendan Canning, Justin Peroff, Andrew Whiteman, Charles Spearin, Jason Collett, Evan Cranley, Leslie Feist, Angus Pauls.
- 2004: Kevin Drew, Brendan Canning, Justin Peroff, Andrew Whiteman, Charles Spearin, Jason Collett, Evan Cranley, Amy Millan, James Shaw.
- 2005: Kevin Drew, Brendan Canning, Justin Peroff, Andrew Whiteman, Charles Spearin, Ohad Benchetrit, Julie Penner, Leslie Feist, Dave Hodge, Lisa Lobsinger, John Crossingham.
- 2006: Kevin Drew, Brendan Canning, Justin Peroff, Andrew Whiteman, Charles Spearin, Ohad Benchetrit, Julie Penner, Amy Millan, Dave Hodge, Lisa Lobsinger, Chris Cochran, Matt Miller.
- 2007: Kevin Drew, Brendan Canning, Justin Peroff, Andrew Kenny, Bill Priddle (eventually Priddle was replaced by James Shaw, and then Mitch Bowden), Sam Goldberg.
- 2008: Kevin Drew, Brendan Canning, Justin Peroff, Andrew Whiteman, Charles Spearin, Jason Collett, Evan Cranley, Amy Millan, Dave Hodge, Sam Goldberg, Liz Powell (fall tour only), Leon Kingstone.
- 2009: Kevin Drew, Brendan Canning, Justin Peroff, Andrew Whiteman, Charles Spearin, Jason Collett, Evan Cranley, Leslie Feist, Dave Hodge, Lisa Lobsinger, Sam Goldberg.
- 2010: Kevin Drew, Brendan Canning, Justin Peroff, Andrew Whiteman, Charles Spearin, David French, John McEntire, Dave Hodge, Lisa Lobsinger, Sam Goldberg.
- 2015: Kevin Drew, Brendan Canning, Justin Peroff, Andrew Whiteman, Charles Spearin, Evan Cranley, Amy Millan
- 2017: Kevin Drew, Brendan Canning, Justin Peroff, Andrew Whiteman, Charles Spearin, Sam Goldberg, Ariel Engle, David French
- 2022–2023: Kevin Drew, Brendan Canning, Justin Peroff (with Loel Campbell substituting for October dates), Andrew Whiteman, Charles Spearin, Sam Goldberg, Jill Harris, Evan Cranley

Collett took time off to promote his solo release Idols of Exile, and to attend to his family, prior to the 2005 fall tour.

During the 2007 tour, Bill Priddle broke his collarbone, just before the band's October 16 gig at the Birmingham Academy II. They were joined on tour by James Shaw from Metric, who had "flown in that morning" from Toronto. Mitch Bowden, Priddle's bandmate in Don Vail and The Priddle Concern, joined the 2007 tour to replace Priddle.

== Discography ==
=== Studio albums ===
List of studio albums, with selected chart positions and certifications
Title	Details	Peak chart positions										Certifications
Title	Details	CAN	AUS Hit.	BEL (FL)	FRA	IRL	SCO	UK	UK Indie	US	US Indie	Certifications
Feel Good Lost	Released: March 6, 2001; Label: Arts & Crafts; Formats: CD, LP, digital download	—	—	—	—	—	—	—	—	—	—	
You Forgot It in People	Released: October 15, 2002; Label: Arts & Crafts; Formats: CD, LP, digital download	—	—	—	—	—	92	—	—	—	—	MC: Gold
Broken Social Scene	Released: October 4, 2005; Label: Arts & Crafts; Formats: CD, LP, digital download	17	—	—	144	27	66	80	10	105	6	MC: Gold
Forgiveness Rock Record	Released: May 4, 2010; Label: Arts & Crafts; Formats: CD, LP, digital download	1	12	—	—	58	73	67	—	34	5	
Hug of Thunder	Released: July 7, 2017; Label: Arts & Crafts; Formats: CD, LP, digital download, streaming	14	3	102	—	—	51	— (Note: Hug of Thunder did not enter the UK Albums Chart, but peaked at number 60 on the UK Album Sales Chart.)	11	96	3	
Remember the Humans	Released: May 8, 2026; Label: Arts & Crafts; Formats: CD, LP, digital download, streaming	—	—	—	—	—	68	—	14	—	—	
"—" denotes a release that did not chart.

=== B-side albums ===
- Bee Hives (2004)
- Old Dead Young (2022)
- Returning The Farewell (2024)

=== Broken Social Scene Presents... ===
- Kevin Drew - Spirit If... (2007)
- Brendan Canning - Something for All of Us... (2008)

=== EPs ===
- Live at Radio Aligre FM in Paris (2004, digital only EP)
- EP to Be You and Me (2005, EP) − originally released with Broken Social Scene
- Broken Social Scene: 2006/08/06 Lollapalooza, Chicago, IL (2006, EP iTunes exclusive)
- Lo-Fi for the Dividing Nights (2010)
- Let's Try the After (Vol. 1) (2019)
- Let's Try the After (Vol. 2) (2019)

=== Singles ===
Title	Year	Peak chart positions							Album
Title	Year	CAN Emg.	CAN Rock	MEX Air.	SCO	UK	UK Indie	US Sales	Album
"Stars and Sons / KC Accidental"	2003	—	—	—	—	—	—	—	You Forgot It in People
"Cause = Time"	2003	—	—	—	—	102	—	—	You Forgot It in People
"Ibi Dreams of Pavement (A Better Day)"	2005	—	—	—	—	—	29	—	Broken Social Scene
"7/4 (Shoreline)"	2006	—	—	—	58	94	9	—	Broken Social Scene
"Fire Eye'd Boy"	2006	—	—	—	—	192	16	—	Broken Social Scene
"Forced to Love / All Is All"	2010	21	33	—	—	—	—	10	Forgiveness Rock Record
"World Sick"	2011	27	—	—	—	—	—	—	Forgiveness Rock Record
"Texico Bitches"	2011	—	—	—	—	—	—	—	Forgiveness Rock Record
"Halfway Home"	2017	—	38	47	—	—	—	—	Hug of Thunder
"Hug of Thunder"	2017	—	—	—	—	—	—	—	Hug of Thunder
"—" denotes a release that did not chart.

=== Film scores ===
- The Love Crimes of Gillian Guess (2004)
- Half Nelson (2006)
- Snow Cake (2006)
- The Tracey Fragments (2007)
- It's Kind of a Funny Story (2010)

=== Soundtracks ===
- Queer as Folk (2003) − "Lover's Spit"
- Wicker Park (2004) − "Lover's Spit"
- Lie with Me (2005)
- Say Uncle (2005)
- Half Nelson (2006) − "Stars & Sons", "Shampoo Suicide", "Da Da Dada", "Mossbraker", "Guilty Cubicles", "Blues for Uncle Gibb", "Lover's Spit (Feist Version)"
- The Invisible (2007)
- The Tracey Fragments (2007)
- The Time Traveller's Wife (2009) − "Love Will Tear Us Apart"
- Scott Pilgrim vs. the World (2010) − "Anthems for a Seventeen Year-Old Girl", "I'm So Sad, So Very, Very Sad" (credited as Crash and the Boys), "We Hate You Please Die" (credited as Crash and the Boys), "Last Song Kills Audience" (credited as Crash and the Boys)
- Faulks on Fiction (2011) − "Lover's Spit"
- I Saw the TV Glow (2024) - "Anthems for a Seventeen Year-Old Girl"

== Music videos ==
- "Stars & Sons" (August 2003, directed by Christopher Mills)
- "Cause = Time" (December 2003, directed by George Vale and Kevin Drew)
- "Almost Crimes" (2004, directed by George Vale and Kevin Drew)
- "Ibi Dreams of Pavement (A Better Day)" (November 2005, directed by Experimental Parachute Movement)
- "7/4 (Shoreline)" (2006, directed by Micah Meisner)
- "Fire Eye'd Boy" (2006, directed by Experimental Parachute Movement)
- "Major Label Debut (Fast)" (2006, directed by Sarah Haywood)
- "Lover's Spit" (May 2006)
- "I'm Still Your Fag" (May 2006, directed by Chris Grismer)
- "Forced to Love" (July 2010, directed by Adam Makarenko and Alan Poon)
- "All to All" (August 2010)
- "Texico Bitches" (December 2010, directed by Thibaut Duverneix)
- "Sweetest Kill" (June 2011, directed by Claire Edmonson)
- ”Vanity Pail Kids” (July 2017, directed by Kevin Drew)
- "Skyline" (September 2017)

== Bibliography ==
- This Book Is Broken (May 2009, written by Stuart Berman)

== Awards ==
=== Juno Awards ===
The Juno Awards are presented by the Canadian Academy of Recording Arts and Sciences. Broken Social Scene has won two awards from five nominations.

Year	Nominee / work	Award	Result
2003	You Forgot It in People	Alternative Album of the Year	Won
2004	"Stars and Sons"	Video of the Year	Nominated
2006	Broken Social Scene	Alternative Album of the Year	Won
2006	Broken Social Scene	CD/DVD Artwork Design of the Year	Nominated
2011	"Forced to Love"	Video of the Year	Nominated
2018	Hug of Thunder	Group of the Year	Nominated

=== Polaris Music Prizes ===
The Polaris Music Prize is awarded annually to the best full-length Canadian album based on artistic merit. Broken Social Scene's self-titled album was nominated in 2006, and Forgiveness Rock Record was nominated in 2010.

Year	Nominee / work	Award	Result
2006	Broken Social Scene	Polaris Music Prize	Nominated
2010	Forgiveness Rock Record	Polaris Music Prize	Nominated

== See also ==
- Music of Canada
- Canadian rock
- List of bands from Canada
- List of Canadian musicians
- Category:Canadian musical groups
