= Stars discography =

- Studio albums: 9
- Extended plays: 6
- Singles: 18
- Video albums: 1
- Remix albums: 1

The discography of Stars, a Canadian indie pop band, consists of nine studio albums, two remix albums, six extended plays, one video album and eighteen singles.

== Albums ==
=== Studio albums ===
List of studio albums, with selected chart positions and certifications
Title	Album details	Peak chart positions						Certifications
Title	Album details	CAN	GER	IRL	UK Indie	US	US Indie	Certifications
Nightsongs	Released: 27 February 2001 (CAN); Label: Le Grand Magistery; Formats: CD, LP	—	—	—	—	—	—	
Heart	Released: 11 February 2003 (CAN); Label: Paper Bag; Formats: CD, LP	—	—	—	—	—	—	
Set Yourself on Fire	Released: 8 March 2005 (US); Label: Arts & Crafts; Formats: CD, LP	—	84	—	22	— (Note: Set Yourself on Fire did not enter the US Billboard 200, but peaked at number 34 on the US Heatseekers Albums Chart.)	40	MC: Gold
In Our Bedroom After the War	Released: 25 September 2007 (US); Label: Arts & Crafts; Formats: CD, LP, digital download	—	63	78	—	— (Note: In Our Bedroom After the War did not enter the US Billboard 200, but peaked at number 10 on the US Heatseekers Albums Chart.)	—	
The Five Ghosts	Released: 21 June 2010 (US); Label: Vagrant; Formats: CD, LP, digital download	9	—	—	—	67	9	
The North	Released: 4 September 2012 (US); Label: ATO; Formats: CD, LP, digital download	5	—	—	—	48	12	
No One Is Lost	Released: 14 October 2014 (US); Label: Soft Revolution; Formats: CD, LP, digital download	18	—	—	—	117	23	
There Is No Love in Fluorescent Light	Released: 13 October 2017; Label: Last Gang; Formats: CD, LP, digital download	70	—	—	—	—	35	
From Capelton Hill	Released: 27 May 2022; Label: Last Gang; Formats: CD, LP, digital download	—	—	—	—	—	—	

=== Other albums ===
Title	Album details
Do You Trust Your Friends?	Released: 22 May 2007 (CAN); Label: Arts & Crafts; Formats: CD, LP
The Bedroom Demos	Released: 7 June 2011 (CAN); Label: Arts & Crafts; Formats: Digital download

=== Video albums ===
List of video albums
Title	Album details
Are We Here Now?	Released: 2007 (CAN); Label: Arts & Crafts; Formats: DVD

== Extended plays ==
List of extended plays, with selected chart positions
Title	EP details	Peak chart positions
Title	EP details	US Heat.
A Lot of Little Lies for the Sake of One Big Truth	Released: 12 February 2001 (CAN); Label: Le Grand Magistery; Formats: CD	—
The Comeback EP	Released: 31 July 2001 (CAN); Label: Le Grand Magistery; Formats: CD	—
Dead Child Stars	Released: November 2002 (CAN); Label: Paper Bag; Formats: CD	—
Sad Robots	Released: 11 November 2008 (CAN); Label: Soft Revolution; Formats: CD, digital download	16
The Séance EP	Released: 21 June 2010 (CAN); Label: Vagrant; Formats: CD, digital download	—
iTunes Live from Montreal	Released: 12 October 2010 (CAN); Label: Get Paid Inc.; Formats: Digital download	—
Lost & Found EP	Released: 18 September 2015 (CAN); Label: Soft Revolution; Formats: Digital download	—

== Singles ==
List of singles, with selected chart positions, showing year released and album name
Title	Year	Peak chart positions					Album
Title	Year	CAN	CAN Rock	SCO	UK	UK Indie	Album
"The Stars Are Out Tonight"	2001	—	—	—	—	—	Non-album single
"My Radio"	2003	—	—	—	—	—	Nightsongs
"Elevator Love Letter"	2003	—	—	—	—	—	Heart
"Petite Mort"	2004	—	—	—	—	—	Non-album single
"Ageless Beauty"	2005	—	—	87	129	10	Set Yourself On Fire
"Your Ex-Lover Is Dead"	2005	—	—	—	223	29	Set Yourself On Fire
"Reunion"	2005	—	—	—	—	—	Set Yourself On Fire
"It's Alchemy!"	2005	—	—	—	—	—	Non-album single
"Take Me to the Riot"	2007	84	40	—	—	—	In Our Bedroom After the War
"The Night Starts Here"	2007	—	—	—	—	—	In Our Bedroom After the War
"Bitches in Tokyo"	2008	—	50	—	—	—	In Our Bedroom After the War
"Undertow"	2008	— (Note: "Undertow" did not enter the Billboard Canadian Hot 100, but peaked at number 28 on the Canada Emerging Artists chart.)	—	—	—	—	Sad Robots
"Fairytale of New York"	2009	—	—	—	—	—	Non-album single
"Fixed"	2010	— (Note: "Fixed" did not enter the Billboard Canadian Hot 100, but peaked at number 19 on the Canada Emerging Artists chart.)	—	—	—	—	The Five Ghosts
"We Don't Want Your Body"	2010	— (Note: "We Don't Want Your Body" did not enter the Billboard Canadian Hot 100, but peaked at number 29 on the Canada Emerging Artists chart.)	—	—	—	—	The Five Ghosts
"Changes"	2011	—	—	—	—	—	The Five Ghosts
"The Theory of Relativity"	2012	—	—	—	—	—	The North
"Hold On When You Get Love and Let Go When You Give It"	2012	— (Note: "Hold On When You Get Love and Let Go When You Give It" did not enter the Billboard Canadian Hot 100, but peaked at number 17 on the Canada Emerging Artists chart.)	44	—	—	—	The North
"Backlines"	2012	—	—	—	—	—	The North
"From The Night"	2014	—	—	—	—	—	No One Is Lost
"No One Is Lost"	2014	—	—	—	—	—	No One Is Lost
"Trap Door"	2015	—	47	—	—	—	No One Is Lost
"Privilege"	2017	—	—	—	—	—	There Is No Love In Fluorescent Light
"We Called It Love"	2017	—	—	—	—	—	There Is No Love In Fluorescent Light
"Fluorescent Light"	2017	—	—	—	—	—	There Is No Love In Fluorescent Light

== Compilations ==
Compilation Name	Record label	Year	Stars song
Was It Him or His Music?	Le Grand Magistery	1999	"My Radio"
Reproductions: Songs of The Human League	March Records	2000	"Stay with Me Tonight"
Sounds Eclectic	Palm Pictures	2000	"Going, Going, Gone"
Little Darla Has a Treat for You, Vol. 16	Darla Records	2001	"The Very Thing (Demo)"
'DET Live! Vol. 3	WDET-FM 101.9 Detroit	2002	"Driveby (Live version recorded 27 October 2000)"
Siblings Soundtrack	Unknown Label	2004	"Golden Chain"
Music from the OC: Mix 5	Warner Bros. Records	2005	"Your Ex-Lover Is Dead"
A Very Magistery Christmas	Le Grand Magistery	2005	"Christmas Song", "A New Year (Live)"
XM: Live at the Verge	Unknown Label	2006	"Calendar Girl (Live)"
Love Goes On: A Tribute To Grant McLennan	Rare Victory Records	2007	"Cattle and Cane"
Arts & Crafts Sampler, Vol. 5	Arts & Crafts	2008	"Rollerskate (Why I Want To Save You)"
FUV Live Volume 11	WFUV	2008	"Midnight Coward (Live)"
The Logic of Pleasure	Soundcolours	2008	"The Night Starts Here (Blank & Jones Remix)"
Eat Raw For Breakfast	Soundcolours	2009	"The Night Starts Here (Raw For Dinner Mix)"
Friday the 13th (Music From the Motion Picture)	New Line Records	2009	"My Favourite Book"
Sing Me to Sleep - Indie Lullabies	American Laundromat Records	2010	"Asleep"
