= Ageless Beauty =

Single by Stars

from the album Set Yourself on Fire
- B-side: "Petit Mort, Ageless Beauty (Most Serene Mix)"
- Released: August 1, 2005
- Genre: Indie pop
- Label: City Slang; Arts & Crafts
- Songwriter(s): Torquil Campbell; Evan Cranley; Patrick McGee; Amy Millan; Christopher Seligman

Stars singles chronology
"Petite Mort" (2004)	"Ageless Beauty" (2005)	"Your Ex-Lover Is Dead" (2005)

"Ageless Beauty" was the fifth single released by the Canadian indie pop group Stars. It was the first single from the album Set Yourself on Fire. The Boston Globe correspondent Bobby Hankinson considered the single to be a "pop gem" in a 2006 concert review; Tampa Bay Times correspondent Brian Orloff shared a similar view, considering the song "a perfect gem of an indie rock tune." "Ageless Beauty" was considered by The Independent to be "perhaps Stars' loveliest song".

== Musicianship ==
Speaking of "Ageless Beauty", The News and Observer noted the single for its "odd...combination of drop-dead-gorgeous tune and ugly words...that you've ever heard," lauding its "juxtaposition" that is "perfectly" repeated "again and again throughout the album."
