= Amy Millan =

Canadian indie rock singer and guitarist

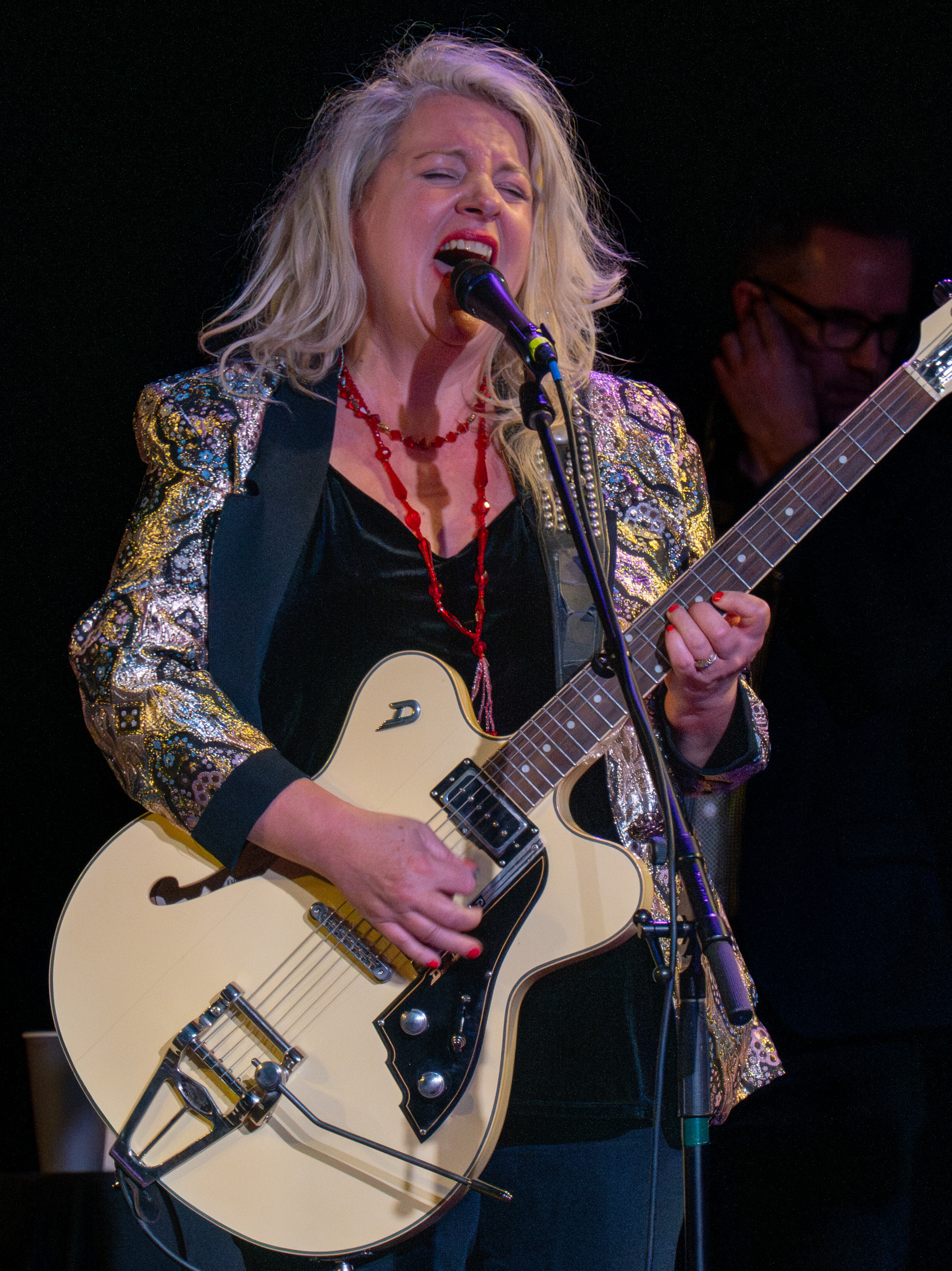
- Millan performing with Stars in 2025

Background information
- Origin: Toronto, Ontario, Canada
- Genres: Indie rock
- Occupation: Musician
- Instruments: Vocals, guitar, piano
- Label: Arts & Crafts Productions
- Website: www.arts-crafts.ca/artists/amy-millan.html

Amy Millan is a Canadian indie rock singer and guitarist. She records and performs with the bands Stars and Broken Social Scene as well as having a successful solo career. Her second solo album, Masters of the Burial, was released by Arts & Crafts Productions in September 2009.

== Biography ==
=== Early life ===
Amy Millan grew up in the Cabbagetown neighbourhood of Toronto. She attended high school at Jarvis Collegiate Institute, and later the Etobicoke School of the Arts where she studied drama alongside future Broken Social Scene bandmates Kevin Drew and Emily Haines. Millan dabbled in acting, appearing as a pregnant teen in the first episode of the second season of Degrassi Junior High.

Millan and Haines formed the band Edith's Mission. Although short-lived, Edith's Mission did play a sold-out show at the Horseshoe Tavern in Toronto.

After high school, Millan moved to Montreal for three years to attend Concordia University and gained experience as a solo performer by playing in coffee shops. Upon returning to Toronto, she formed the roots-rock band 16 Tons and wrote many of the songs that she would use to launch her solo career several years later. After the breakup of 16 Tons, Millan moved to Los Angeles.

While living there, her song with 16 Tons, "Bury Me," was added to the soundtrack of the film Drowning Mona. However, Millan, missing a city where walking was encouraged over driving, returned to Toronto.

=== Stars ===
Stars was formed by Torquil Campbell and Chris Seligman in New York City. The line-up subsequently grew to incorporate Evan Cranley, with whom Millan had played gigs while a member of 16 Tons. Feeling that Millan would be a good fit for the group, Cranley invited her to New York City to audition in December 1999. After receiving assurances that she would be actively involved in the songwriting process, Millan agreed to join the band. As much of their debut album had been recorded prior to her joining, Millan's involvement in 2001's Nightsongs was limited, although she did write and sing lead vocals on "Toxic Holiday". Desiring to return to Canada, but not wanting to move to Toronto, the band relocated to Montreal. Drummer Pat McGee was recruited as their fifth member prior to the release of their second album, Heart, in 2003.

Millan's influence was more evident on this album, and a number of the tracks were performed as duets between her and Torquil Campbell, establishing a style for which the band would become well known. Stars' commercial breakthrough came with their 2004 album Set Yourself on Fire and the accompanying single "Ageless Beauty", which she wrote and featured a lead vocal by Millan. Their fourth album, In Our Bedroom After the War, was released in 2007 and was followed by the EP Sad Robots the following year. In June 2010, they released their fifth full-length album, The Five Ghosts.

=== Broken Social Scene ===
Although she did not officially contribute to Broken Social Scene's first two albums, due to scheduling conflicts for BSS members Emily Haines and Leslie Feist, she was asked by former classmate Kevin Drew to "be the girl" and sing with the band for the release concert of the band's second album, You Forgot It in People. From 2002 onward, Millan has often performed in BSS alongside fellow Stars members Evan Cranley, Chris Seligman and Torquil Campbell. She appeared on their 2005 self-titled album and also contributed vocals and writing to Kevin Drew's 2007 solo album Spirit If... as well as to Brendan Canning's 2008 solo album Something For All of Us. As in Stars, Amy usually sings with BSS but also plays guitar and percussion during live shows.

=== Honey from the Tombs ===
Amy Millan released her debut solo album, Honey from the Tombs, in 2006. It consisted of songs largely written before 2000, from when Millan was a member of 16 Tons. The album title was inspired by a Tom Waits interview where he compared the release of older songs to the discovery of sweet honey buried in Egyptian tombs. The album was produced by Ian Blurton and musical contributors included Brendan Canning and Kevin Drew of Broken Social Scene and Dan and Jenny Whiteley from Crazy Strings.

In contrast to her work with Stars, Millan's solo work is strongly influenced by country and folk music. Thematically, many of the songs deal with loss and loneliness, and taking solace in alcohol is sung about numerous times. Millan's upbringing in Toronto provided the inspiration for the song "Wayward and Parliament", which is based on her time working in the coffee shop "Jet Fuel" on Parliament Street.

Two videos were shot to promote Honey from the Tombs: "Skinny Boy" was directed by George Vale, and "Baby I" was directed by Anthony Seck. The songs "Losin' You" and "Baby I", were released as 7" singles in Europe. Millan also toured extensively to support the album, playing dates in North America, Japan and Europe.

=== Masters of the Burial ===
Millan released her second album, Masters of the Burial, on September 8, 2009. The album is produced by Martin Kinack and musicians appearing include Evan Cranley, Dan and Jenny Whiteley, Mark Roy, Leslie Feist and Liam O'Neil. The album features several cover songs, including some written by Death Cab for Cutie and Sarah Harmer.

=== Personal life ===
Millan is married to Stars bandmate Evan Cranley. Their daughter, Delphine Rita Jane Cranley, was born on March 21, 2011. Millan gave birth to a son in 2017.

== Discography ==
=== Albums ===
Title	Label	Year
Honey from the Tombs	Arts & Crafts/City Slang Records	2006
Masters of the Burial	Arts & Crafts	2009
I Went to Find You	Last Gang Records	2025

=== EPs ===
Title	Label	Year
KCRW.com Presents Morning Becomes Eclectic	Arts & Crafts	2007

=== Singles ===
Single	B-Side	Label	Format	Year
Losin' You	"We All Lose One Another" by Jason Collett	Arts & Crafts	7"	2006
Baby I	"Murder Train Song"	Arts & Crafts	7"	2006
Wire walks	N/A	Last Gang Records	Digital, streaming	2025

=== Compilations ===
Album	Year	Songs	Notes
Drowning Mona Soundtrack	2000	"Bury Me"	Performed with Grindig; the song appeared in the movie, but was not included on the soundtrack album
XM: Live at the Verge	2006	"Skinny Boy (Live)"	
CBC Radio 3 Sessions, Volume III	2007	"Skinny Boy (Live)"	
Mamma Yamma and Friends	2008	"Broccoli Song"	Rewritten version of "He Brings Out the Whiskey in Me" performed on children's television

=== Collaborations ===
Album	Artist	Year	Songs
A Good Day Sailing	Memphis	2002	"The Phone Call"
Folkloric Feel	Apostle of Hustle	2004	"Baby You're in Luck"
Live at Radio Aligre in Paris	Broken Social Scene	2004	"Almost Crimes", "Baby You're in Luck", "Starts with a Big Finish", "Cause=Time", "Bruised Ghosts", "Let's Get Out of Here"
Broken Social Scene	Broken Social Scene	2005	"Ibi Dreams of Pavement", "Major Label Debut", "Hotel", "Bandwitch"
Idols of Exile	Jason Collett	2005	"Fire", "Parry Sound", "I'll Bring the Sun", "These Are the Days"
Alone, Not Alone	Montag	2005	"Perfect Vision", "Angles, Country & Gerrain Connu"
Going Places	Montag	2007	"Mechanical Kids", "Safe in Sound"
Spirit If...	Broken Social Scene Presents: Kevin Drew	2007	"Broke Me Up", "Aging Faces/Losing Places", "When It Begins"
Everything I've Forgotten to Forget	Amos the Transparent	2007	"After All That, It's Come to This"
The Priddle Concern	The Priddle Concern	2008	"Back Around"
Something for All of Us	Broken Social Scene Presents: Brendan Canning	2008	"Been at It So Long"
A New Tide	Gomez	2009	"Win Park Slope"
It Goes, It Goes	Halves	2010	"Growing and Glow"
Forgiveness Rock Record	Broken Social Scene	2010	"Chase Scene", "Sentimental X's"
Worlds	Porter Robinson	2014	"Divinity"
Shelter	Porter Robinson and Madeon	2016	"Shelter"
Hug of Thunder	Broken Social Scene	2017	"Halfway Home", "Skyline", "Victim Lover", "Gonna Get Better"
Worlds (10th Anniversary Edition)	Porter Robinson	2024	"Hollowheart"

For Amy Millan's work with Stars, see Stars discography.
