= Your Ex-Lover Is Dead =

Single by Stars

from the album Set Yourself on Fire
- A-side: "Your Ex-Lover Is Dead"
- B-side: "Fairytale of New York"
- Released: December 9, 2005
- Genre: Baroque pop
- Length: 4:16
- Label: City Slang Records
- Songwriter: Torquil Campbell

Stars singles chronology
""Ageless Beauty""	"Your Ex-Lover Is Dead"	""It's Alchemy!""

Your Ex-Lover Is Dead was the sixth single released by the Canadian indie pop group Stars. It is the opening track on their album Set Yourself on Fire. The track begins with the voice of lead singer Torquil's father Douglas Campbell saying, "When there is nothing left to burn, you have to set yourself on fire." The song was listed as the 298th best song of the 2000s by Pitchfork Media. The music video shows the band lying on their backs, playing their instruments, while on ice outdoors.

The song was featured on the Season 5 finale of the popular Canadian teen drama series Degrassi: The Next Generation. This track is also featured on the album Music from the OC: Mix 5. On the first season of So You Think You Can Dance Canada, Caroline Torti was eliminated after dancing her solo to this song, on October 30, 2008.

"Your Ex-Lover Is Dead" was featured on Fox network's So You Think You Can Dance, season 6. Ex-contestant and choreographer Travis Wall chose it as the track for his piece danced by Ellenore Scott and Ryan Di Lello. It appears in a number of films including the 2008 Italian movie Caos Calmo (Quiet Chaos), the soundtrack for the 2010 Canadian indie film Daydream Nation, starring Kat Dennings as well as appearing in the concluding scene of Tanner Hall (2009).

== Music video ==
Taking inspiration from the Charlie Kaufman film “Eternal Sunshine of the Spotless Mind”, the music video for the single depicts the members of the band lying on an ice rink whilst playing their respective instruments and singing, as crowds of skaters skate around them. The video takes place at night, and occasionally shows images of the skaters holding hands with each other, the night sky above them. As the song progresses, more and more cracks appear and grow from where each of the band members is lying.
