= The North (album) =

Studio album by Stars
- Released: September 4, 2012
- Recorded: RCA Victor Studios (Montréal)
- Genre: Indie pop; new wave; synthpop; baroque pop; electropop
- Length: 43:54
- Label: ATO
- Producer: Graham Lessard; Marcus Paquin; Stars

Stars chronology
The Five Ghosts (2010)	The North (2012)	No One Is Lost (2014)

Singles from The North
- 1. "Theory of Relativity" Released: July 17, 2012; 2. "Hold On When You Get Love and Let Go When You Give It" Released: July 18, 2012; 3. "Backlines" Released: August 7, 2012

The North is the sixth full-length studio album by Canadian indie pop band Stars. It was released on September 4, 2012, through ATO Records. The album has been characterized as having a more upbeat feel to it compared to previous works, as Amy Millan notes: the album was meant to be "playful, joyful and hopeful." The album debuted at number 5 on the Canadian Albums Chart.

The album's cover shows the Habitat 67 complex, an experimental housing development as well as architectural landmark in Montreal, the band's home city.

== Reception ==
Professional ratings
Aggregate scores
Source	Rating
Metacritic	76/100
Review scores
Source	Rating
Allmusic	4/5 stars
Slant Magazine	2.5/5 stars
Sputnikmusic	4.4/5 stars
Absolutepunk	85%
Pitchfork Media	6.7/10

The album has received mainly positive reviews from music critics. Metacritic assigned an average score of 70 to the album based on 22 reviews, which indicates "generally favorable reviews".

== Track listing ==
All tracks are written by Stars.

No.	Title	Length
1.	"The Theory of Relativity"	4:26
2.	"Backlines"	2:11
3.	"The North"	4:52
4.	"Hold On When You Get Love and Let Go When You Give It"	4:39
5.	"Through the Mines"	4:10
6.	"Do You Want to Die Together?"	3:12
7.	"Lights Changing Colour"	3:06
8.	"The Loose Ends Will Make Knots"	2:32
9.	"A Song is a Weapon"	3:12
10.	"Progress"	3:50
11.	"The 400"	3:28
12.	"Walls"	4:16
Total length:		43:54

Amazon.com & iTunes digital download bonus track
No.	Title	Length
13.	"The North" (Breakglass Version)	3:28
Total length:		47:22

== Personnel ==
The North album personnel adapted from Discogs.

Stars

- Amy Millan – guitar, vocals
- Torquil Campbell – keyboard, vocals
- Chris Seligman – piano, keyboards, synthesizer, French horn
- Evan Cranley – bass, guitar, synthesizer, percussion, trombone
- Patty McGee – drums, percussion

Production

- Graham Lessard – engineer
- Marcus Paquin – engineer
- Chris McCarron – guitar technician (maintenance)
- Dave Cooley – mastering
- Tony Hoffer – mixing
- Chris Claypool – mixing (assistant)
- Graham Lessard – production
- Marcus Paquin – production
- Stars – production
- David Carswell – additional recording
- John Collins – additional recording

Artwork

- The Cardboardbox Project, Derek Broad – album artwork
