= The Golden Record =

Studio album by Little Scream
- Released: April 11, 2011
- Genre: Indie rock, art rock, folk, pop
- Length: 46:37
- Label: Secretly Canadian
- Producer: Richard Reed Parry

Little Scream chronology
The Golden Record (2011)	Cult Following (2016)

Professional ratings
Aggregate scores
Source	Rating
Metacritic	77/100
Review scores
Source	Rating
AllMusic	link
MusicOMH	link
Pitchfork	8.1/10 link
PopMatters	link

The Golden Record is the debut studio album by Montreal singer and indie rock artist Little Scream, released by the Secretly Canadian label on April 11, 2011.

The album features production by Arcade Fire’s Richard Reed Parry and accompanied by Aaron Dessner of The National, Marcus Paquin of Silver Starling, Mike Feuerstack of Snailhouse, Becky Foon, formerly of Silver Mt. Zion, Patty McGee of Stars, as well as Arcade Fire's Tim Kingsbury and Sarah Neufeld (also of Bell Orchestre).

== Background ==
The songs on the album were written between 2001 and 2010, with Laurel Sprengelmeyer stating "At least two songs were ones conceived in their original format by my little sister and [myself] for our first band, Big Unit. So the writing is all over the place. I kind of like to think of this album as a greatest hits record of my first three albums of unreleased material." They remained unrecorded and unreleased until Sprengelmeyer "forced herself to get over a painful fear of performing."

== Recording ==
Recording for The Golden Record began in 2009 with producer Richard Reed Parry of the band Arcade Fire. Of the recording process, Sprengelmeyer states "Because of Richard's schedule the recording process got spread out over a long period of time, almost a year and a half. The nice thing about that was that it meant we got to take a lot of time to listen carefully and think about arrangements and atmospheres for each song."

Sprengelmeyer approached the album making process "as a painting and building up layers and atmosphere". Unlike her previous efforts, Sprengelmeyer also increased her involvement on the technical side of the recording process, learning how to engineer her record.

== Title & Artwork ==
The album is named after the Voyager Golden Records, phonograph records that were included aboard both Voyager spacecraft launched in 1977, the contents of which were selected by Carl Sagan. In an interview with The 405 magazine, Sprengelmeyer elaborates, saying "I'm a sucker for tragedy. And as far as I'm concerned, the Voyager record might be one of the most poignant and beautiful and futile gestures of communication we humans may ever create. In the scope of my personal life, this record will likely have a similar significance."

Sprengelmeyer's own artwork is featured as the album cover.

== Track listing ==
No.	Title	Writer(s)	Length
1.	"The Lamb"	Little Scream	3:37
2.	"Cannons"	Little Scream, Lily Sprengelmeyer	3:48
3.	"The Heron and the Fox"	Little Scream	5:02
4.	"Your Radio"	Little Scream	5:14
5.	"Black Cloud"	Little Scream	5:07
6.	"Guyegaros"	Little Scream	4:21
7.	"Boatman"	Little Scream	3:32
8.	"People Is Place"	Little Scream	4:35
9.	"Red Hunting Jacket"	Little Scream, Lily Sprengelmeyer	4:03
10.	"Hallowed"	Little Scream	7:18

== Personnel ==
Musicians

- Pietro Amato - clapping, stomping
- Aaron Dessner - engineer, guitar
- Becky Foon - cello
- Mike Feuerstack - engineer, lap steel guitar
- Eric Hove - flute
- Tim Kingsbury - vocals
- Ben Klaff - arranger
- Patty McGee - drums
- Kaveh Nabatian - clapping, stomping
- Sarah Neufeld - violin
- Marcus Paquin - dobro, engineer, mixing
- Richard Reed Parry - arranger, background vocals, bass, drums, engineer, guitar, piano, producer, synthesizer,
- Jess Roberson - flute, bass flute
- Stef Schneider - clapping, stomping
- Natalie Shatula - vocals
- Marika Shaw - viola
- Laurel Sprengelmeyer - arranger, composer, cover painting, guitar, piano, producer, synthesizer, violin, vocals
- Lily Sprengelmeyer - composer

Production

- Vid Cousins - engineer
- Tom Dempsey - photography
- Alan Douches - mastering
- Zoltán Kodály - interpretation, transcription
- Richmond Lam - photography
