= Amos the Transparent =

Canadian rock band

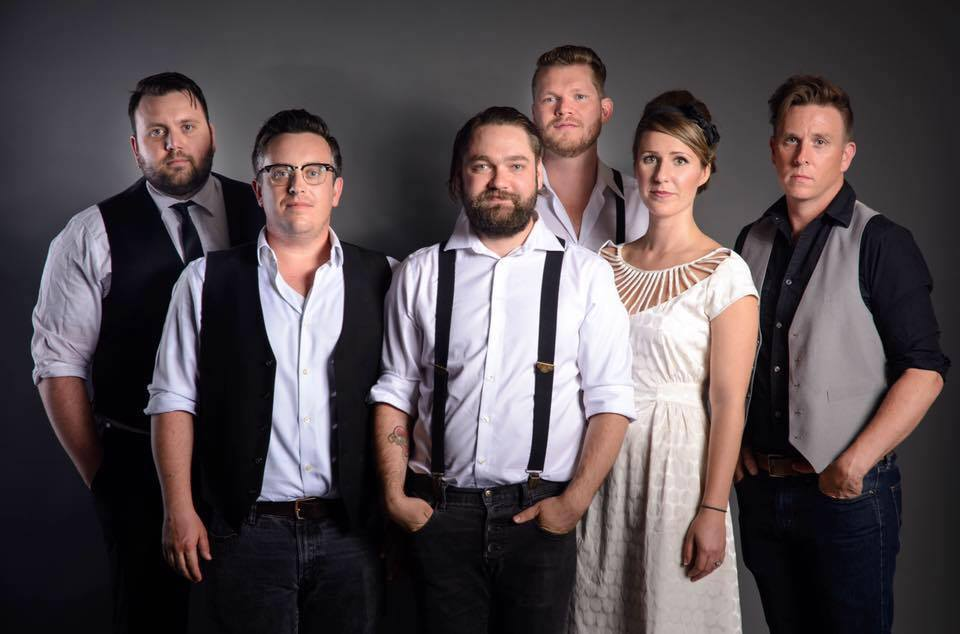

Background information
- Origin: Ottawa, Ontario, Canada
- Genres: Indie rock
- Years active: 2007–present
- Labels: 45 Records, Pop Culture Records, Sunday School Music
- Members: Jonathan Chandler – Vocals, Guitar; Olenka Reshitnyk – Guitar, Vocals; Dan Hay – Guitar; James Nicol – Bass, Vocals; Christopher Wilson – Drums; Mike Yates – Cello
- Website: www.amosthetransparent.com/

Amos the Transparent is a Canadian rock band from Ottawa, Ontario. Members are Jonathan Chandler (vocals, guitar), Olenka Reshitnyk (vocals, guitar), Dan Hay (guitar), James Nicol (bass guitar, vocals), drummer Christopher Wilson and cellist Mike Yates.

== History ==
Amos the Transparent was formed by Ottawa songwriter Jonathan Chandler, and drummer Christopher Wilson to solidify material that was written over a period of several years commencing in 2005. The duo applied a collective approach to the recording process of their debut Everything I've Forgotten to Forget, drawing out the influences and talents of numerous guest artists including Amy Millan of Stars, who makes a special guest vocal appearance on the duet "After All That, It's Come to This", and also Evan Cranley, also of Stars.

Their debut album, Everything I've Forgotten to Forget, was released on Pop Culture Records in 2007, and an EP, My What Big Teeth You Have... followed in 2009 on Sunday School Music.

Their second album, Goodnight My Dear...I'm Falling Apart, was released in February 2012. It was preceded in 2011 by two separate EPs, Goodnight My Dear and I'm Falling Apart, which each previewed four songs that would appear on the full album. It features contributions from numerous guest artists, including Miranda Mulholland and Robyn Dell'Unto. Amos the Transparent's third album was titled "This Cold Escape" and is a "loosely biographical" concept album. In 2018, the band released their fourth album, Anniversaries.

The songs "Lemons" and "All You Bellydancers" have received extensive airplay on all major college and university radio stations, CBC Radio, and XM Satellite Radio. The song "After All That, It's Come to This" was used in a television ad for online dating giant PlentyofFish.

== Touring and performance ==
The band has played numerous festivals and toured with Patrick Watson, Tokyo Police Club, Mother Mother, The Dears, The Reason, Basia Bulat, Sloan, the Inbreds and Ben Caplan. They have also opened for Jeff Beck and Loverboy.

In 2008, to honour Canadian hall of famer Alanis Morissette, the band performed their melancholy version of her hit song "You Oughta Know" at a live concert at the National Arts Centre, in Ottawa which was later broadcast on CBC Radio across Canada.

Amos the Transparent have recorded three in-studio sessions with The Verge. They were the musical guest on CBC Radio One's Q on February 17, 2012, days after the release of their second full-length album, Goodnight My Dear...I'm Falling Apart.

In 2016 (originally broadcast in 2017), the group recorded a rendition of The Tragically Hip song "Gift Shop" for The Strombo Show's nationally broadcast "Hip 30" special honouring The Tragically Hip's 30th anniversary.

== Former members ==
- Cameron McLellan – Bass
- Steve Bragg – Guitar, vocals
- Kelsey Mcnulty – Keys, vocals
- Ana Miura – vocals
- Blair Hogan – Guitar, vocals
- Jake Von Wurden – Bass
- Tom Svilans – Keys
- Kate Cooke – vocals
- Mark Hyne – Guitar, vocals
- Kate Sargent – Keys, vocals

== Discography ==
- Everything I've Forgotten to Forget (2007)
- My What Big Teeth You Have (2009, EP)
- A Is for Amos (2010, EP)
- Goodnight My Dear...I'm Falling Apart (2012)
- This Cold Escape (2014)
- Anniversaries (2018)

== Television and film ==
1. The song "Greater Than Consequence" appeared on MTV's The Real World: Back to New Orleans, Episode 2.
2. The song "Greater Than Consequence" was featured on Degrassi: The Next Generation, Season 10, Episode 39.
3. The song "After All That, It's Come to This" was featured in a television ad for online dating website Plenty of Fish.
4. The song "Coming Home" was featured in a scene of Australian TV show Offspring on Season 5 Episode 5.

== See also ==
- Music of Canada
- Canadian rock
- List of Canadian musicians
- Category:Canadian musical groups
