= Masters of the Burial =

Studio album by Amy Millan
- Released: September 8, 2009
- Genres: Indie pop, alternative country, bluegrass
- Label: Arts & Crafts

Amy Millan chronology
Honey from the Tombs (2006)	Masters of the Burial (2009)	I Went to Find You (2025)

Professional ratings
Review scores
Source	Rating
AllMusic	link
Pitchfork	(5.8/10) link

Masters of the Burial is the second solo album from Canadian musician Amy Millan of Stars and Broken Social Scene. It was released in Canada on September 8, 2009, on the Arts & Crafts label and features guest performances by Stars bandmate Evan Cranley, Leslie Feist and others. It was produced by Martin Davis Kinack.

== Track listing ==
1. "Bruised Ghosts"
2. "Low Sail"
3. "Old Perfume" (Weeping Tile cover)
4. "Towers"
5. "Day to Day" (Jenny Whiteley cover)
6. "Bury This"
7. "Finish Line"
8. "Run for Me" (Richard Hawley cover)
9. "I Will Follow You into the Dark" (Death Cab for Cutie cover)
10. "Lost Compass"
11. "Bound"
