= No One Is Lost =

Studio album by Stars
- Released: October 14, 2014
- Recorded: Mount Zoomer, Montreal
- Genre: Indie pop, electronic, synthpop
- Length: 48:35
- Label: Soft Revolution / ATO
- Producer: Stars and Liam O'Neil

Stars chronology
The North (2012)	No One Is Lost (2014)	There Is No Love in Fluorescent Light (2017)

Singles from No One Is Lost
- 1. "From the Night" Released: 2014; 2. "No One Is Lost" Released: 2014

No One Is Lost is the seventh studio album by Canadian indie pop band Stars, released on October 14, 2014, by Soft Revolution / ATO Records.

== Background ==
Co-produced by old friend Liam O'Neil, the album was recorded in a new studio that had just been converted from the old rehearsal space of Handsome Furs. Vocalist Torquil Campbell often slept on the studio's couch over the course of the sessions, and explained that the more electronic direction of the album was a result of the beats audible from the gay discothèque located on the floor below, recalling that "The music would end at 3:30. I was trying to get to sleep and Charli XCX would be, like, banging downstairs. And, I loved it."

The album's recurring themes of mortality and loss were inspired the cancer diagnosis of longtime manager Eoin O'Leary during the writing process. Campbell explained the album's title further: "This record’s called No One Is Lost because that is a fucking lie. We are all lost, we are all going to lose this game and, as you get older, you lose people more and more. I just wanted to close my eyes and jump and hope that was true. Life is loss, love is loss. And loving people is about accepting that you're going to have to say goodbye to them. And that's why it's fucking brave. That's Stars ethos: this life is very heartbreaking and sad... so let's get completely fucking arseholed and listen to some Dionne Warwick."

== Critical reception ==
Professional ratings
Review scores
Source	Rating
Allmusic	4/5 stars
Consequence of Sound	B-
Exclaim!	7/10
Pitchfork Media	5.8/10
PopMatters	6/10

No One Is Lost received middling to good reviews from music critics. At Metacritic, which assigns a normalized rating out of 100 to reviews from mainstream critics, the album holds an average score of 73, based on 12 reviews. In a positive review for Allmusic, Timothy Monger wrote that "Stars' dedication to genuine human emotions married to strong pop melodicism has stayed with them since day one and No One Is Lost is merely another chapter in their unique story. However they dress up their music, it remains easy to connect with and this album proves it." Ian Cohen of Pitchfork was less enthusiastic, writing that "when No One Is Lost tries to blend in with the youth, Stars sound like professors rather than participants....While a fine enough record in its own right, it’s more suited to fostering a discussion about the theoretical implications of our collective, impending doom than celebrating it." Evan Sawdey of PopMatters characterized the production as "sometimes too-inviting", writing that the "warm melodies and beds of synths are so pleasing to the ear that almost none of the member's vocals make an impactful landing. It's almost as if the group is absolutely afraid of having a single second of the album not be filled with some sort of emotive instrumentation." Nevertheless, he concluded that the album was "still a grand listen and worthwhile for fans of the band or those partial to stories of star-crossed love in general."

== Track listing ==
All songs written and composed by Stars.

1. "From the Night" - 6:29
2. "This Is the Last Time" - 2:46
3. "You Keep Coming Up" - 4:04
4. "Turn It Up" - 4:32
5. "No Better Place" - 4:22
6. "What Is To Be Done?" - 5:18
7. "Trap Door" - 4:38
8. "Are You OK?" - 4:02
9. "A Stranger" - 3:26
10. "Look Away" - 4:13
11. "No One Is Lost" - 4:45

== Personnel ==
- Amy Millan - vocals
- Evan Cranley - bass
- Patrick McGee - drums
- Chris Seligman - synthesizers
- Torquil Campbell - vocals
- Chris McCarron - guitar
- Murray Lightburn - guitar on "A Stranger"
- Liam O'Neil - saxophone on "Trap Door"
- Jimmy Shaw - synthesizers and co-production on "No One Is Lost"

== Charts ==
Chart (2014)	Peak position
Canadian Albums Chart	18
U.S. Billboard 200	117
