= Do You Trust Your Friends? =

Remix album by Stars
- Released: May 22, 2007
- Genres: Indie pop, indie rock
- Label: Arts & Crafts

Stars chronology
Set Yourself on Fire (2004)	Do You Trust Your Friends? (2007)	In Our Bedroom after the War (2007)

Professional ratings
Review scores
Source	Rating
AllMusic	4/5 stars
Music Box	3/5 stars
Pitchfork	(1.8/10)
PopMatters	(5/10)
Prefix Magazine	3.5/5 stars

Do You Trust Your Friends? is the first remix album released by Stars consisting of covers and remixes from Stars' 2004 album Set Yourself on Fire. It was released in 2007 on the Arts & Crafts label in North America.

== Track listing ==
1. "Your Ex-Lover Is Dead" (Final Fantasy) 4:50
2. "Set Yourself on Fire" (Montag) 3:17
3. "Ageless Beauty" (The Most Serene Republic) 4:04
4. "Reunion" (Jason Collett) 3:55
5. "The Big Fight" (Minotaur Shock) 4:50
6. "What I'm Trying to Say Pt. 1" (The Dears) 3:03
7. "What I'm Trying to Say Pt. 2" (The Dears) 2:59
8. "One More Night" (Apostle of Hustle) 5:42
9. "Sleep Tonight" (Junior Boys) 4:22
10. "The First Five Times" (The Russian Futurists) 3:19
11. "He Lied About Death" (Metric) 3:58
12. "Celebration Guns" (Camouflage Nights with Kevin Drew) 3:28
13. "Soft Revolution" (The Stills) 4:22
14. "Calendar Girl" (Young Galaxy) 3:35
