= Cult Following =

Studio album by Little Scream
- Released: May 6, 2016
- Recorded: 2014–15
- Studio: Hotel de Ville, Hotel2Tango, Sonovox Studio, The Bridge, Studio MixArt, Spinning Plates
- Genre: Indie rock, art rock, folk, pop
- Length: 44:05
- Label: Merge Records, Dine Alone Records
- Producer: Richard Reed Parry

Little Scream chronology
The Golden Record (2011)	Cult Following (2016)

Singles from Cult Following
- 1. "Love As A Weapon" Released: February 10, 2016; 2. "Someone Will Notice" Released: April 5, 2016; 3. "The Kissing" Released: April 12, 2016; 4. "Dark Dance" Released: April 19, 2016

Professional ratings
Aggregate scores
Source	Rating
Metacritic	79/100
Review scores
Source	Rating
AllMusic	4/5 stars
American Songwriter	3/5 stars
Exclaim	(8/10)
Mojo	4/5 stars
NOW Magazine	4/5 stars
Pitchfork	(7.5/10)

Cult Following is the second studio album by American-born, Montreal-based indie rock artist Little Scream (Laurel Sprengelmeyer). It was released on Merge Records (in the United States) and Dine Alone Records (in Canada) on May 6, 2016.

== Background ==
Sprengelmeyer's own experiences influenced the direction of Cult Following as she "'grew up in a kind of Christian religious cult' as a Jehovah’s Witness" as well as her visit to a "cult-like group in Brazil". In an interview with Exclaim, Sprengelmeyer described her album as her attempt at making Purple Rain if it was "done by a Midwestern girl with more of a folk upbringing". Although unused on the final cut of the album, three of the songs were mixed by Prince's longtime collaborator, David Z. at Sunset Sound Recorders where Purple Rain was mixed.

On the song "Love as a Weapon", Sprengelmeyer says "I was thinking of classic pop songs, how a good one can lift you out of a fog like nothing else. This is a song of rebellious joy, for dancing and crying and starting over, again and again."

== Recording ==
The album features Sufjan Stevens, Sharon Van Etten, Aaron Dessner and Bryce Dessner (of The National), Owen Pallett, Kyp Malone (of TV on the Radio), and Mary Margaret O'Hara. Many of the album's collaborations came about through friendships and previous collaborations. Regarding her collaboration with O'Hara, Sprengelmeyer remarked that she was the only person she "really reached out to as a fan".

Richard Reed Parry, of the band Arcade Fire, is credited as Little Scream's creative partner and helped with the music on the album.

== Promotion ==
The first single, "Love as a Weapon," premiered on February 10, 2016 on Beats 1 Radio with Zane Lowe. The music video for the single premiered on March 22, 2016.

The song "Someone Will Notice" premiered on April 5, 2016. "The Kissing", featuring Kyp Malone of TV on the Radio, was released as a third pre-release single on April 12, 2016.

== Track listing ==
No.	Title	Length
1.	"Welcome to the Brain"	0:53
2.	"Love as a Weapon"	4:52
3.	"Dark Dance"	4:21
4.	"Introduction to Evan"	0:30
5.	"Evan"	5:02
6.	"Aftermath"	1:03
7.	"The Kissing"	4:45
8.	"Wishing Well"	5:45
9.	"Wreckage"	5:35
10.	"Someone Will Notice"	5:34
11.	"Silent Moon"	4:41
12.	"Goodbye Every Body"	1:04

== Personnel ==
Musicians

- Andrew Barr - drums, vocals
- Brad Barr - guitar, vocals
- Thomas Bartlett - keyboards, piano
- Aaron Dessner - engineer, guitar, synthesizer, bass
- Bryce Dessner - guitar
- Jeremy Gara - drums
- Adam Kinner - saxophone
- Kyp Malone - vocals
- Mary Margaret O'Hara - vocals
- Sarah Pagé - harp
- Owen Pallett - string arrangements, violin
- Marcus Paquin - bass, composer, engineer, guitar, mixing, producer
- Richard Reed Parry - bass, upright bass, composer, drum machine, drums, engineer, guitar, keyboards, percussion, producer, string arrangements
- Andrew Peneycad - vocals
- Parker Shper - piano
- Laurel Sprengelmeyer - art direction, composer, guitar, noise, omnichord, piano, primary artist, synthesizer, vocals
- Lily Sprengelmeyer - composer, vocals, engineer, producer
- Sufjan Stevens - composer, synthesizer
- Sharon Van Etten - vocals
- Mark "Bucky" Wheaton - drums

Production

- Pietro Amato - engineer
- Philip Shaw Bova - mastering
- Hans Bernhard - engineer
- Howard Bilerman - engineer
- Dusdin Condren - cover photo
- Mikel Durlam - art direction, composer
- Maggie Fost - design
- Mark Lawson - engineer
- Joey Kramm - inside photo
- Rusty Santos - mixing
- Tim Vesely - engineer
- Jordy Walker - engineer
- David Z. - mixing
