= From Capelton Hill =

Studio album by Stars
- Released: 27 May 2022
- Studio: Mixart, Breakglass, and Zoomer (Montreal)
- Genre: Indie pop; electropop; chamber pop
- Length: 45:59
- Label: Last Gang; MNRK
- Producer: Marcus Paquin; Jace Lasek

Stars chronology
| There Is No Love in Fluorescent Light (2017) | From Capelton Hill (2022) |

From Capelton Hill is the ninth studio album by Canadian indie pop band Stars. It was released on 27 May 2022 by Last Gang Records and MNRK Music Group. The album was produced by Marcus Paquin and Jace Lasek. The title is in reference to Capelton Hill in Quebec's Eastern Townships region.

== Reception ==
From Capelton Hill ratings
Aggregate scores
| Source | Rating |
|---|---|
| AnyDecentMusic? | 7.2/10 |
| Metacritic | 77/100 |
Review scores
| Source | Rating |
| AllMusic | 4/5 stars |
| American Songwriter | 4/5 stars |
| Exclaim! | 8/10 |
| Mojo | 4/5 stars |
| MusicOMH | 4/5 stars |
| Paste | 6.9/10 |
| Record Collector | 4/5 stars |
| Spill | 4.5/5 stars |
| Uncut | 6/10 |
| XS Noize | 8/10 |

According to the review aggregator Metacritic, From Capelton Hill received "generally favorable reviews" based on a weighted average score of 77 out of 100 from 7 critic scores.

AllMusic's Fred Thomas said the band "fearlessly investigate difficult feelings on From Capelton Hill, and capture a complex beauty in the process." American Songwriter's Lee Zimmerman said "From Capelton Hill is an album that's literally brimming over with unceasing delights, making it not only an exceptional comeback but what can justifiably be called, Stars' album for the ages." Spill's Ljubinko Zivkovic wrote that, "As always, on From Capelton Hill, Stars manage to tick all of the above pop formula boxes almost (and often) to perfection". XS Noize's Ashley Kreutter called the album "truly is a Stars album, through and through. It's a testament to the band's skill and artistry, to the dream weaving and hazy storytelling they are known for." Kreutter called the title track, "Capelton Hill", "the true shining star of this album", Exclaim!'s Bruno Coulombe called it "the [album's] true standout number", and Spectrum Culture's called it "the album's best moment".

From Capelton Hill was included on the longlist for the 2022 Polaris Music Prize.

== Track listing ==
All tracks are written by Stars.

From Capelton Hill track listing
| No. | Title | Length |
|---|---|---|
| 1. | "Palmistry" | 4:19 |
| 2. | "Pretenders" | 3:01 |
| 3. | "Patterns" | 3:52 |
| 4. | "Back to the End" | 3:40 |
| 5. | "That Girl" | 2:58 |
| 6. | "Build a Fire" | 3:18 |
| 7. | "Capelton Hill" | 4:44 |
| 8. | "Hoping" | 3:18 |
| 9. | "To Feel What They Feel" | 3:14 |
| 10. | "If I Never See London Again" | 4:56 |
| 11. | "I Need the Light" | 4:15 |
| 12. | "Snowy Owl" | 4:24 |
| Total length: | | 45:59 |

== Personnel ==
=== Stars ===
- Torquil Campbell
- Amy Millan
- Evan Cranley
- Chris Seligman
- Patrick McGee
- Chris McCarron

=== Additional musicians ===
- Murray Lightburn and Jace Lasek – additional vocals
- David French – saxophone
- Jesse Zubot – strings

=== Technical ===
- Stars – arrangement
- Jace Lasek – producer, mixing engineer
- Marcus Paquin – producer
- Philip Gosselin – mastering engineer (Le Lab Mastering, Montreal)
- Gaëlle Leroyer – front and back cover photos
- Evan Cranley – inner sleeve photo
- Rob Carmichael – design
- Album recorded at Mixart Studios, Breakglass Studio, and Zoomer (Montreal)
