= Dead Child Stars =

EP by Stars
- Released: November 2002
- Genre: Indie pop, indie rock
- Label: Paper Bag

Stars chronology
| The Comeback EP (2001) | Dead Child Stars (2002) | Heart (2003) |

Professional ratings
Review scores
| Source | Rating |
|---|---|
| AllMusic | 4/5 stars |

Dead Child Stars is an EP by Canadian indie rock band Stars, released in 2003 on Paper Bag Records. It was released as a special collector's item available only on the band's 2003 concert tour, and was not sold in stores, except as a bonus item available with pre-order of Heart from HMV Canada's Web store.

It contains two tracks from the band's album Heart, one of which is an alternate version edited for radio play, and two non-album tracks.

== Track listing ==
| No. | Title | Length |
|---|---|---|
| 1. | "The Vanishing" | 5:06 |
| 2. | "Your Love" | 5:02 |
| 3. | "Heart" (Radio edit) | 4:35 |
| 4. | "The Face" | 4:38 |
