= I Dreamed We Fell Apart =

Studio album by Memphis
- Released: 2002
- Label: Paper Bag Records
- Producer: Chris Dumont

Memphis chronology
A Good Day Sailing (EP) (2002)	I Dreamed We Fell Apart (2002)	A Little Place in the Wilderness (2006)

Professional ratings
Review scores
Source	Rating
AllMusic	4/5 stars

I Dreamed We Fell Apart is the full-length debut by Memphis, released in 2004 on Paper Bag Records.

== Track listings ==
All tracks written by Torquil Campbell and Chris Dumont, except "Love Comes Quickly", by Chris Lowe and Neil Tennant.

1. "The Second Summer" (3:41)
2. "For Anyone Eighteen" (3:38)
3. "Into the Wild" (3:28)
4. "3:15 on the Last Day of School" (3:24)
5. "Hey Mister, Are You Awake?" (2:14)
6. "East Van" (5:35)
7. "The Nootka Chimes" (0:58)
8. "Nada" (3:41)
9. "Love Comes Quickly" (4:41)
10. "Lullaby for a Girlfriend (or Happy Trails)" (2:54)
11. "Voicemail" (2:59)
