= Nightsongs (Stars album) =

2001 studio album by Stars

Studio album by Stars
- Released: February 27, 2001
- Genre: Indie pop, baroque pop, electronica
- Length: 52:16
- Label: Le Grand Magistery

Stars chronology
| A Lot of Little Lies for the Sake of One Big Truth (2000) | Nightsongs (2001) | The Comeback EP (2001) |

Professional ratings
Review scores
| Source | Rating |
|---|---|
| Allmusic | 3/5 stars |
| Pitchfork Media | (7.8/10) |

Nightsongs is the first album by Canadian indie rock band Stars, released in 2001 on Le Grand Magistery. At this time, Stars consisted only of Torquil Campbell and Chris Seligman, although both Amy Millan and Emily Haines of Metric make appearances. There is also a very rare vinyl pressing of the record on the Japanese label Syft, which has since gone out of business. The vinyl pressing also has 2 additional tracks ("Friend's Father's Mother" and "Angeline") not featured on the CD version.

== Track listing ==
All songs by Stars, except "This Charming Man" by Morrissey and Johnny Marr.

| No. | Title | Length |
|---|---|---|
| 1. | "Counting Stars on the Ceiling" | 4:14 |
| 2. | "My Radio" (AM mix) | 4:20 |
| 3. | "Going, Going, Gone" (with Emily Haines) | 4:31 |
| 4. | "This Charming Man" | 2:43 |
| 5. | "On Peak Hill" (with Emily Haines) | 3:36 |
| 6. | "International Rock Star" | 3:09 |
| 7. | "The Very Thing" | 3:26 |
| 8. | "Write What You Know" | 3:18 |
| 9. | "Tru" | 3:35 |
| 10. | "Better Be Heaven" | 3:34 |
| 11. | "Liar" | 4:31 |
| 12. | "Tonight" | 3:46 |
| 13. | "Toxic Holiday" (with Amy Millan) | 3:41 |
| 14. | "My Radio" (FM mix) | 3:52 |

== In other media ==
- "International Rock Star" features dialogue from the film adaptation of The Collector. The Smiths, whose single "This Charming Man" is covered on this album, also feature material from the film using a production still of Terence Stamp as the cover art for their 1985 single "What Difference Does It Make?"
- Going, Going, Gone" was featured in season 1 episode 6 ("Reckoning," 2001) of the television series Alias.
- "Tonight" was used in a 2006 Canadian short film of the same name.
- "Going, Going, Gone" was featured in season 1 episode 6 ("Powerless", 2007) of the television series Life.
