= Montag (musician) =

Canadian electronic musician (born 1978)

- Born: Antoine Bédard c. 1978; Gaspé, Quebec
- Origin: Montreal, Quebec, Canada
- Genre: Electronic music
- Label: Carpark
- Website: www.montag.ca www.antoinebedard.com

Antoine Bédard (born 1977) is a Canadian composer, musician and sound designer, best known for his recordings under the stage name Montag. Originally from Gaspé, Quebec, he is based in Montreal.

He sings in both French and English. An openly gay man, Bédard's song "Best Boy Electric" is a boy-on-boy duet that tells of the romance that prompted his move to Vancouver, British Columbia.

== Music career (Montag) ==
Bédard began releasing music in 2002 under the name Montag, with a first album released in France on Gooom Disques, the label of M83. He subsequently toured with acts such as Stars and Broadcast, and released several albums and EPs in Europe and Japan before joining Carpark Records in the United States. His album Alone, Not Alone received a score of 7.8/10 on Pitchfork, and he performed at major festivals including MUTEK (Montreal), SXSW (Austin) and CMJ (New York).

Sometimes referred to as a "laptop musician", he received a grant from the Quebec Arts Council to record and catalogue orchestra instruments. He uses the database—with the sounds sometimes looped and processed—in his live performances, along with his own keyboard playing.

On his 2005 album Alone, Not Alone, he collaborated with hip hop music producer Sixtoo.

His 2007 album, Going Places, includes collaborations with M83, Ida Nilsen, Ghislain Poirier, Final Fantasy and Amy Millan. For the title track, he spliced together sounds that fans from around the world had sent in to him; he credits 70 contributors.

In 2012, Montag released one single a month, all released by Carpark Records. Each single was accompanied by a music video.

== Theatre and interdisciplinary work ==
From 2006 onward, Bédard developed a parallel career as a composer and sound designer for the performing arts. He has since composed original music for approximately fifty theatrical productions, collaborating with directors such as Robert Lepage, Chris Abraham and Claude Poissant, as well as Louis-Karl Tremblay, Sébastien David and Maxime Carbonneau.

During his time in Vancouver, he became an active participant in the city's artistic scene, developing long-standing collaborations with artists including Maiko Yamamoto, Cindy Mochizuki, Mindy Parfitt and Anita Rochon.

He has also composed for films, contemporary dance and circus productions, and immersive public art installations and interactive museum devices.

Recent works include original music for Tout ça (Théâtre du Quat'sous, 2024), Corps Fantômes (Duceppe, 2025) and Que notre joie demeure (TNM, 2026).

== Portrait sonore ==
Bédard is co-founder of Portrait sonore, an organization that produces and distributes audio walks highlighting urban heritage through a mobile application.

== Awards ==
- 2008 Jessie Richardson Theatre Award for Outstanding Sound

Design or Original Composition, for 4.48 Psychosis

== Discography ==
=== Albums ===
- Are You a Friend? (2002) – Gooom Disques
- Alone, Not Alone (2004) – Gooom Disques (2005) - Carpark Records
- Goodbye Fear (2005) – Rallye Records / Carpark Records
- Going Places (2007) – Carpark Records
- Hibernation (2009) – Carpark Records
- Phases (2012) – Carpark Records

=== Extended plays ===
- Objets perdus (EP, 2003) – AI Records
- Paperworks (EP, 2003) – self-released
- C'est l'hiver (EP, 2003) – self-released
- Early Winter Songs (EP, 2004) – self-released
- Calendrier (EP, 2005) – self-released
- Gone Places (EP, 2007) – self-released
- Des cassettes et un Walkman jaune (EP, 2009) – self-released
