= Torquil Campbell =

Canadian musician (born 1972)

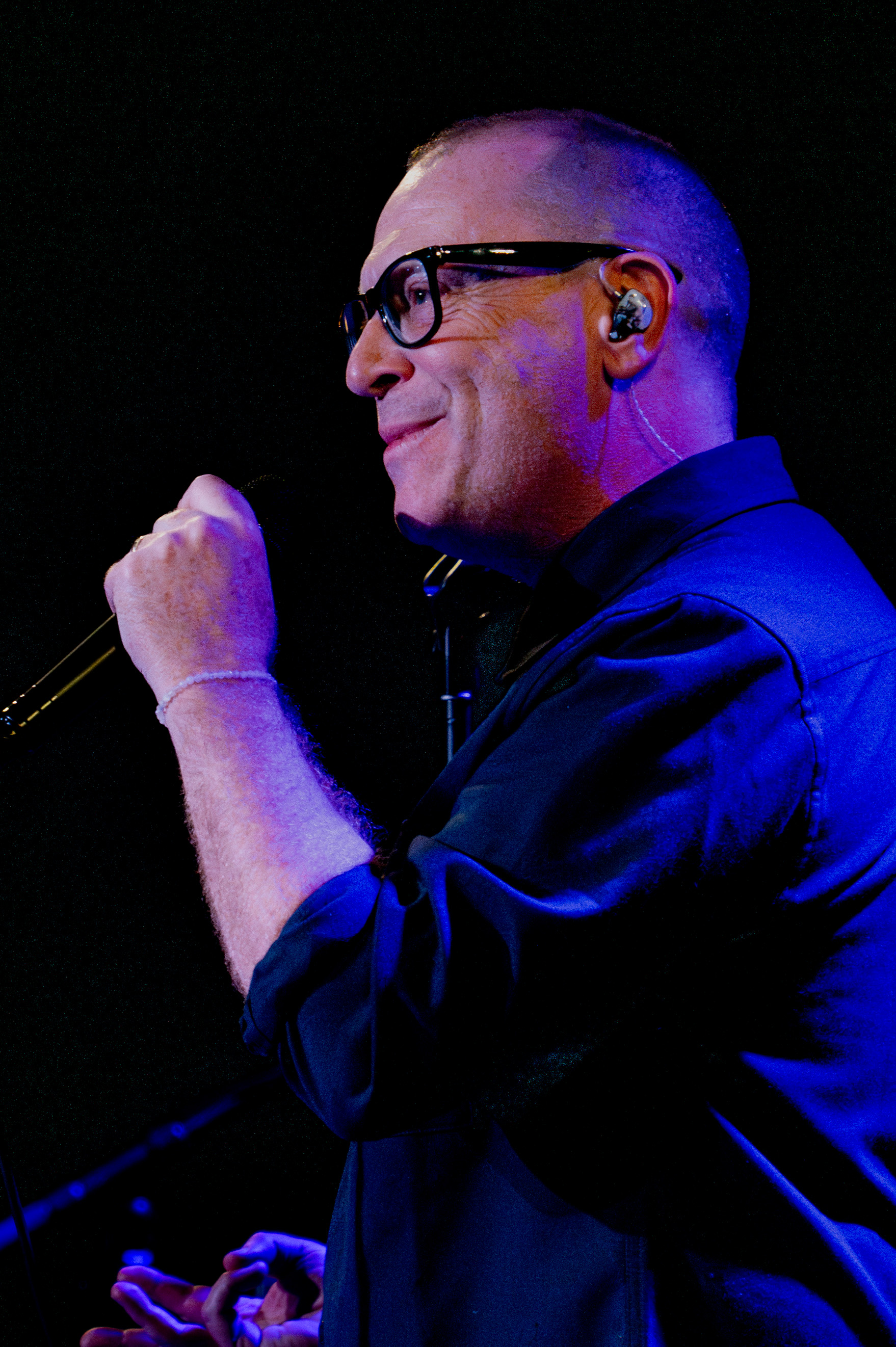
- Campbell performing with Stars in 2025
- Born: March 17, 1972 (age 54); Sheffield, England
- Occupations: Musician; actor; playwright
- Parent: Douglas Campbell
- Musical career
- Also known as: Dead Child Star
- Origin: Toronto, Ontario, Canada
- Genres: Indie rock
- Instruments: Vocals; melodica; trumpet; synthesizer; tambourine
- Labels: Arts & Crafts; Soft Revolution
- Member of: Stars; Memphis; Broken Social Scene; Genuine Menace

Torquil Campbell (born March 17, 1972) is the co-lead singer and a songwriter for the Montreal-based indie rock band Stars. In addition to singing, he also plays the melodica, trumpet, synthesizer, and tambourine. Campbell is also an actor and playwright, most recently co-creating and starring in the play True Crime, produced by Crow's Theatre in Toronto.

He is a co-host of Soft Revolution, a podcast about the intersection of art, culture, and politics, along with Toronto-based actor Ali Momen. Previously, Campbell was the co-host of The Basement Revue Podcast, along with musician Jason Collett and poet Damian Rogers, as well as a regular contributor to the CBC radio program Q.

== Music career ==
Campbell is the cofounder of the indie rock band Stars, formed in 2000. He is also one half of the musical duo Memphis, who have released four albums to date: I Dreamed We Fell Apart (2004), A Little Place in the Wilderness (2006), Here Comes a City (2011), and Leave with Me (2019). This album was financed through a crowdfunding campaign. In addition to his involvement in these projects, Campbell occasionally records and performs with Broken Social Scene, a Canadian indie rock musical collective.

In 2008, Campbell launched the solo project Dead Child Star, whose debut album, titled Cold Hands, Warm Heart, came out in January 2011.

In 2024, he composed music for the drama film We Forgot to Break Up.

In 2026, Campbell collaborated with the UK-based musician and producer Joseph Da Silva on a studio project called Genuine Menace. They have released the EP Nobody|Someone.

== Theatre career ==
Campbell has worked as an actor for much of his life, appearing onstage throughout North America, playing roles as diverse as Gary, the teenage prostitute, in the original New York production of the controversial play Shopping and Fucking, starring Philip Seymour Hoffman, and the title role in Shakespeare's Henry V.

He has directed theatre, including a production of Romeo and Juliet for the Hamptons Shakespeare Festival. Campbell has also had numerous acting roles in Canadian television series and TV movies, including the role of Bill Badger in the animated series Rupert, the short film Snow, the television films Heaven on Earth and Pray for Me, Paul Henderson, and guest appearances in Sex and the City and Law & Order. Additionally, he has designed music and sound for theatre.

Campbell toured a play across Canada, co-created with Chris Abraham, about convicted murderer and imposter Christian Gerhartsreiter. Entitled True Crime, the play has been performed in various large and small venues across the nation.

== Personal life ==
Campbell was born in Sheffield, England, and came to Canada during childhood with his family. He is the son of actor Douglas Campbell and his wife, Moira Wylie. He attended and graduated from Jarvis Collegiate Institute in Toronto, before going on to study theatre in New York City. He resides in Vancouver with his family.

== Discography ==
=== with Stars ===
- Nightsongs (2001)
- Heart (2003)
- Set Yourself on Fire (2004)
- In Our Bedroom After the War (2007)
- The Five Ghosts (2010)
- The North (2012)
- No One Is Lost (2014)
- There Is No Love in Fluorescent Light (2017)
- From Capelton Hill (2022)

=== with Memphis ===
- A Good Day Sailing (2002)
- I Dreamed We Fell Apart (2004)
- A Little Place in the Wilderness (2006)
- Here Comes a City (2011)
- Leave with Me (2019)

=== with Broken Social Scene ===
- Broken Social Scene (2005)

=== as Dead Child Star ===
- Cold Hands, Warm Heart (2011)

=== with Genuine Menace ===
- Nobody | Someone (2026)
