= Little Scream =

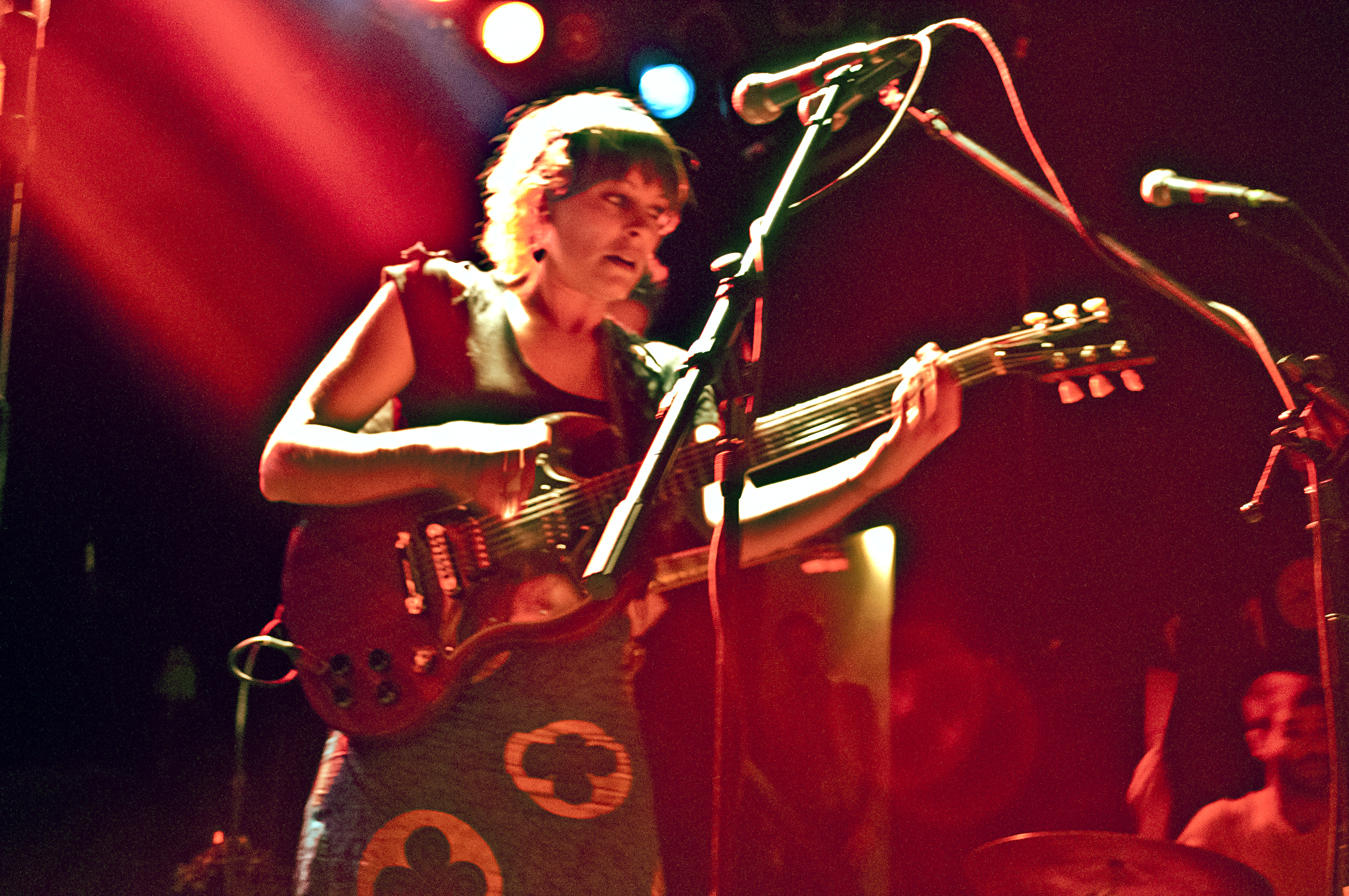
- Little Scream performing

Background information
- Born: Laurel Sprengelmeyer; Iowa, United States
- Origin: Montreal, Quebec, Canada
- Genres: Folk, Art Rock
- Instruments: Violin, Piano, Guitar
- Years active: 2010–present
- Labels: Secretly Canadian, Outside Music, Merge Records, Dine Alone Records
- Website: littlescream.com

Little Scream is the stage name of American-born, Montreal-based singer, songwriter, multi-instrumental musician and artist Laurel Sprengelmeyer. Her debut album The Golden Record was released on Outside Music in Canada and Secretly Canadian elsewhere on March 15, 2011. Her musical style has been described as a blend of folk, pop and art rock.

Laurel Sprengelmeyer was born in Iowa, where she studied piano and violin as a child. After moving to Montreal, she connected with well-known Canadian musicians, including some from Arcade Fire, Thee Silver Mt. Zion and The National, who would later collaborate on her debut album. Little Scream is also a visual artist, using her own oil painting on the cover of The Golden Record.

The Golden Record was co-produced by Arcade Fire's Richard Parry and received a 2011 Polaris Music Prize longlist nomination.

Little Scream appeared in the 2011 lineup of the MusicNOW Festival.

Prior to her solo recording as Little Scream, Laurel Sprengelmeyer contributed vocals to The National's album High Violet.

In January 2016, Little Scream joined Merge Records and Dine Alone Records (Canada) and announced an LP to be released later in the year. The first single, "Love as a Weapon," premiered on February 10, 2016, and the album Cult Following was released on May 6, 2016.

Little Scream is one of the featured artists on the 2016 Red Hot Organization compilation album Day of the Dead produced by Aaron and Bryce Dessner of The National, covering Grateful Dead's "Brokedown Palace" alongside Richard Reed Parry of Arcade Fire, Caroline Shaw, and Garth Hudson.

She married Parry in 2019.

== Discography ==
=== Studio albums ===
- The Golden Record (2011)
- Cult Following (2016)
- Speed Queen (2019)
