= Set Yourself on Fire =

Studio album by Stars
- Released: September 14, 2004
- Recorded: 2003–2004
- Genres: Indie pop, chamber pop, electronic
- Length: 53:07
- Label: Arts & Crafts
- Producers: Stars, Tom McFall

Stars chronology
| Heart (2003) | Set Yourself on Fire (2004) | Do You Trust Your Friends? (2007) |

Alternative cover
- Cover of European and vinyl editions

Set Yourself on Fire is the third studio album by Canadian indie rock band Stars. It was released on September 14, 2004 on the Arts & Crafts International record label in Canada and the United Kingdom, and on March 8, 2005 in the United States.

The album's most notable single was "Ageless Beauty", the band's breakthrough hit in Canada. "Your Ex-Lover Is Dead" has also garnered significant play in the United States. It was featured on the soundtrack of The O.C.

On November 17, 2009, "Your Ex-Lover Is Dead" was featured on Fox network's So You Think You Can Dance, season 6. Former show contestant and current choreographer Travis Wall chose it as the track for his piece danced by Ellenore Scott and Ryan Di Lello.

In 2005 Set Yourself on Fire was a Juno Award nominee for Alternative Album of the Year. It lost to the album Let It Die by Feist, who is an occasional bandmate of Stars' Amy Millan, Torquil Campbell, and Evan Cranley in the indie rock band Broken Social Scene.

The novelist Ibi Kaslik is quoted on the jacket of the album. The album features string arrangements from Bulgarian composer Todor Kobakov.

== Cover art ==
The cover art varies from North America to Europe. The Canadian and U.S. releases have the same artwork. The European edition, along with the Canadian and U.S. vinyl version, have alternative cover art.

== Critical reception ==
Professional ratings
Aggregate scores
| Source | Rating |
|---|---|
| Metacritic | 81/100 |
Review scores
| Source | Rating |
| AllMusic | 4/5 stars |
| Blender | 4/5 stars |
| Entertainment Weekly | B+ |
| The Guardian | 4/5 stars |
| The Irish Times | 4/5 stars |
| NME | 8/10 |
| Pitchfork | 8.4/10 |
| Q | 3/5 stars |
| Rolling Stone | 4/5 stars |
| Spin | A− |

Set Yourself on Fire was widely acclaimed by music critics and holds a score of 81 out of 100 on the online review aggregator Metacritic, indicating "universal acclaim".

== Track listing ==
| No. | Title | Length |
|---|---|---|
| 1. | "Your Ex-Lover Is Dead" | 4:16 |
| 2. | "Set Yourself on Fire" | 5:39 |
| 3. | "Ageless Beauty" | 4:05 |
| 4. | "Reunion" | 3:41 |
| 5. | "The Big Fight" | 5:22 |
| 6. | "What I'm Trying to Say" | 3:22 |
| 7. | "One More Night (Your Ex-Lover Remains Dead)" | 5:18 |
| 8. | "Sleep Tonight" | 4:21 |
| 9. | "The First Five Times" | 3:00 |
| 10. | "He Lied About Death" | 5:12 |
| 11. | "Celebration Guns" | 3:05 |
| 12. | "Soft Revolution" | 3:16 |
| 13. | "Calendar Girl" | 4:07 |

== Certifications ==
| Country | Certification | Sales/shipments |
|---|---|---|
| Canada | Gold | 50,000 |
