= Memphis (band) =

Canadian-American musical duo

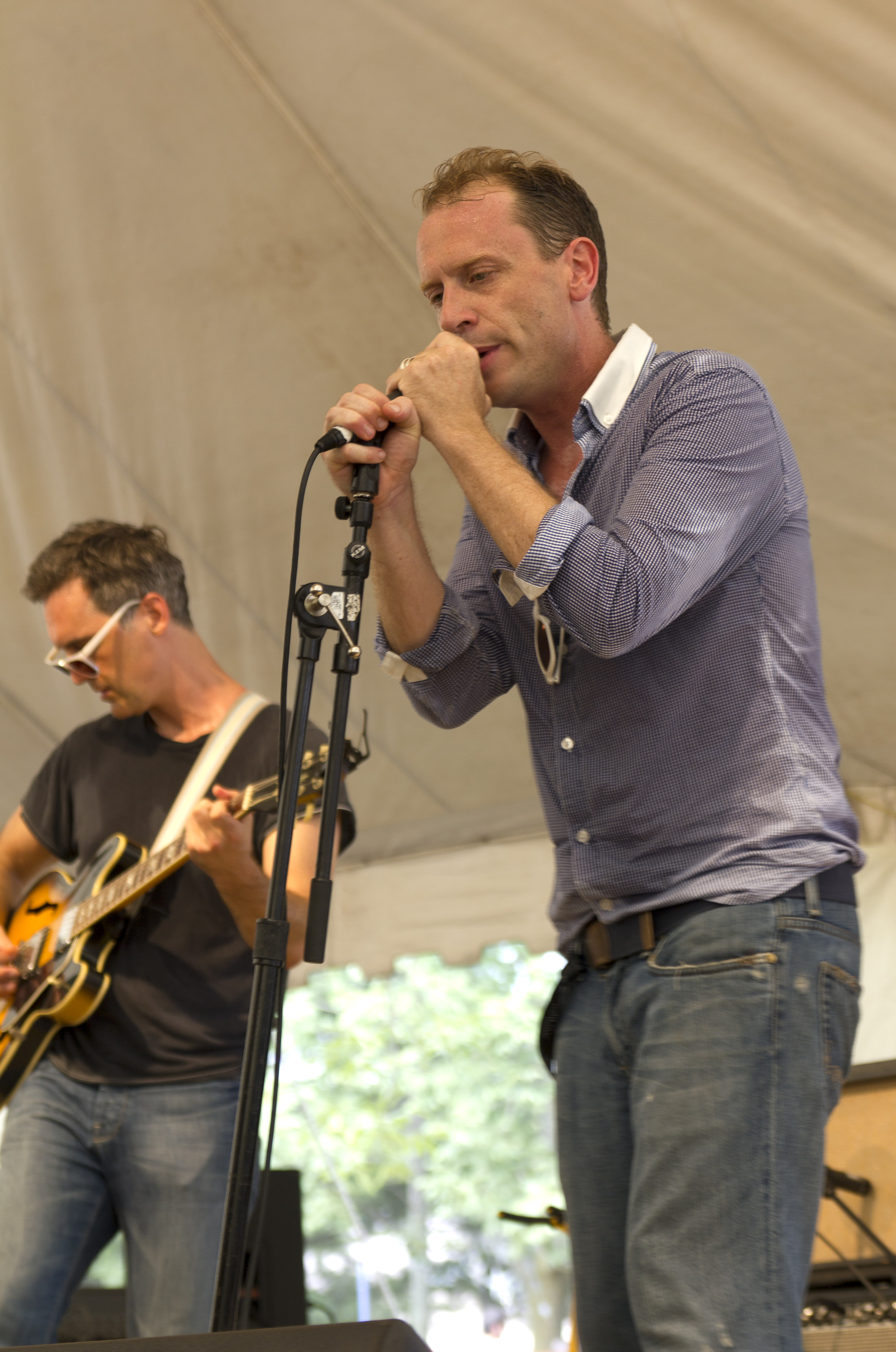
- Memphis performing in 2011
- Members: Torquil Campbell; Chris Dumont

Memphis is a musical duo consisting of longtime friends Torquil Campbell and Chris Dumont.

Dumont, originally from North Carolina, first met Campbell in New York City in the early 1990s. With Campbell's childhood friends Chris Seligman, James Shaw, and Adam Marvy, the pair played together in a band called Luxe. Later, Seligman and Campbell would form Canada's indie pop group Stars, while Shaw would go on to form Metric with Emily Haines, with Dumont continuing to work on the carousel in New York's Central Park.

Following the initial success of Stars, Campbell invited Dumont to visit Vancouver, British Columbia, and Memphis was born. The duo's first effort, an EP entitled A Good Day Sailing, was released on Le Grand Magistery in 2002. Over the course of the summers of 2003 and 2004, Dumont and Campbell recorded the full-length follow-up, I Dreamed We Fell Apart, released in 2004 on Paper Bag Records.

Their next album, A Little Place in the Wilderness, produced by Dumont, was released on August 15, 2006, through Good Fences, EMI.

On January 10, 2011, Memphis announced the release of their third full-length album. Here Comes a City came out on March 8, 2011 on Arts & Crafts.

Their fourth album, Leave With Me was completed in 2018 and is due for release.

== Discography ==
- A Good Day Sailing (2002)
- I Dreamed We Fell Apart (2004)
- A Little Place in the Wilderness (2006)
- Here Comes a City (2011)
- Leave with Me (2019)
