= A Little Place in the Wilderness =

Studio album by Memphis
- Released: August 15, 2006
- Genre: Indie rock
- Length: 41:48
- Label: Good Fences
- Producer: Chris Dumont

Memphis chronology
I Dreamed We Fell Apart (2004)	A Little Place in the Wilderness (2006)	Here Comes a City (2011)

Professional ratings
Review scores
Source	Rating
AllMusic	3.5/5 stars
Pitchfork	6.4/10

A Little Place in the Wilderness is the follow-up to Memphis's 2004 full-length album, I Dreamed We Fell Apart. It was released on August 15, 2006, on Good Fences, EMI.

== Track listing ==
1. "I Dreamed We Fell Apart"
2. "In the Cinema Alone"
3. "Incredibly Drunk on Whiskey"
4. "Time Away"
5. "A Ghost Story"
6. "A Little Place in the Wilderness"
7. "I'll Do Whatever You Want"
8. "Swallows and Amazons"
9. "In the Highest Room"
10. "The Night Watchman"
