= The Comeback (EP) =

The Comeback EP

EP by Stars
- Released: July 31, 2001
- Genre: Indie pop, baroque pop, electronica
- Length: 21:30
- Label: Le Grand Magistery

Stars chronology
Nightsongs (2001)	The Comeback EP (2001)	Dead Child Stars (2002)

Professional ratings
Review scores
Source	Rating
AllMusic	4/5 stars

The Comeback EP is an EP by the Canadian indie rock band Stars, released in 2001 on Le Grand Magistery Records.

== Track listing ==
No.	Title	Length
1.	"Krush"	4:40
2.	"Violent"	3:45
3.	"The Aspidistra Flies"	3:53
4.	"Cótes Des Neiges"	4:27
5.	"The Comeback"	4:45
