= Honey from the Tombs =

Studio album by Amy Millan
- Released: May 30, 2006
- Genres: Indie pop, alternative country, bluegrass
- Label: Arts & Crafts
- Producer: Ian Blurton

Amy Millan chronology
Honey from the Tombs (2006)	Masters of the Burial (2009)

Professional ratings
Review scores
Source	Rating
AllMusic	4/5 stars
Pitchfork	5.9/10

Honey from the Tombs is the debut solo album by Canadian singer Amy Millan from the bands Stars and Broken Social Scene. It was released on May 30, 2006 on the Arts & Crafts record label.

Millan says the song "Skinny Boy" is about her Broken Social Scene bandmate Kevin Drew.

== Track listing ==
1. "Losin You" (2:26)
2. "Skinny Boy" (3:29)
3. "Ruby II" (1:46)
4. "Baby I" (3:28)
5. "Headsfull" (1:51)
6. "Wayward and Parliament" (3:30)
7. "Hard Hearted (Ode to Thoreau)" (3:58)
8. "Blue in Yr Eye" (2:49)
9. "Come Home Loaded Roadie" (3:58)
10. "All the Miles" (2:52)
11. "He Brings out the Whisky in Me" (3:46)
12. "Pour Me Up Another" (2:59)
13. "Murder Train Song"* (2:03)
14. "She Got By"* (3:07)
- Japanese Bonus Track
