= Heart (Stars album) =

Studio album by Stars
- Released: February 11, 2003
- Recorded: 2001–2002
- Genre: Indie pop, baroque pop
- Length: 47:53
- Label: Paper Bag (Canada); Arts & Crafts (U.S.)
- Producer: Stars

Stars chronology
Dead Child Stars (2003)	Heart (2003)	Set Yourself On Fire (2004)

Professional ratings
Review scores
Source	Rating
Allmusic	4/5 stars
Pitchfork Media	8.4/10

Heart is the second studio album by the Canadian indie rock band Stars, released on Paper Bag Records in Canada and on Arts & Crafts in the USA.

The album features three regional covers: the Canadian cover features a man embracing a woman who is resting on the man's lap, the US cover features a billboard with a woman's eyes gazing onward, and the European cover features three women spying out of a porthole.

The album was originally released with a bonus promotional sampler of acts with current releases on Paper Bag, including Matthew Barber, Hawaii, The FemBots and Uncut. Two tracks from Heart were repeated on the sampler, along with a non-album bonus track, "Timeless."

The US release includes a hidden bonus track, a live version of "The Comeback", originally taken from the 2001 EP of the same name. The track "Look Up" uses an English horn solo from the beginning of the third movement of Symphonie Fantastique by Hector Berlioz, and the track "The Woods" contains quotes from the movie Grey Gardens, the famed cult-classic documentary from 1975. Videos for the songs "Elevator Love Letter" and "Look Up" were shot to promote this album.

The album was recorded in the bedroom of keyboard player Chris Seligman on Avenue Mont-Royal in Montreal.

== Track listing ==
All tracks are written by Stars.

No.	Title	Length
1.	"What the Snowman Learned About Love"	5:15
2.	"Elevator Love Letter"	4:03
3.	"Heart"	5:55
4.	"The Woods"	2:44
5.	"Death to Death"	4:05
6.	"The Vanishing"	4:37
7.	"Romantic Comedy"	4:20
8.	"Time Can Never Kill the True Heart"	4:58
9.	"Look Up"	4:18
10.	"Life Effect"	3:14
11.	"Don't Be Afraid to Sing"	4:24
12.	"The Comeback" (Hidden Track on US release)	4:04
