= Sad Robots =

EP by Stars
- Released: September 1, 2008
- Genres: Indie pop, baroque pop, electropop
- Length: 22:13
- Label: Arts & Crafts

Stars chronology
In Our Bedroom After the War (2007)	Sad Robots (2008)	The Five Ghosts (2010)

Professional ratings
Review scores
Source	Rating
InYourSpeakers	(Positive)
Pitchfork	(6.2/10)

Sad Robots is an EP released by the Canadian band Stars. It was released on September 1, 2008, on digital download. It is also available as a physical CD through their website, as well as during their fall 2008 tour. The album cover and merchandise for Stars' 2008–9 tour features the comic robot character Boilerplate.

== Track listing ==
No.	Title	Length
1.	"Maintenance Hall, 4 A.M."	2:18
2.	"A Thread Cut with a Carving Knife"	5:51
3.	"Undertow"	4:12
4.	"Going, Going, Gone" (Live version)	3:53
5.	"14 Forever"	3:48
6.	"Sad Robot"	2:11
