= Silver Starling =

Canadian indie pop band

Silver Starling is a Canadian indie pop band from Montreal, Quebec, Canada.

== Biography ==
Silver Starling began as a project of Montreal-born singer-songwriter Marcus Paquin. Outside of creating his own music Marcus has been a recording engineer having worked with Torngat, Arcade Fire, and The National.

Paquin met drummer Liam O'Neill after seeing him perform at a free jazz show and the two soon began performing the songs together. Marika Anthony-Shaw joined the band, adding violin, viola and keyboards. Peter X was soon added on bass guitar and banjo. The then four-piece recorded their self-titled debut album and added Gabriel Lambert as an additional guitarist. The album was released on Last Gang Records in October 2009. It reached No. 115 on the Earshot Top 200 and No. 130 on the CMJ Top 200. It was distributed through Universal Music in Canada and Fontana in USA.

Falling under the genre classification of pop/rock, their sound was described as "brilliantly conceived, skillfully executed art-pop", "touchingly vulnerable yet heart-achingly optimist slow rock tinged with the gentleness of folk" with "an eclectic-yet-carefully-plotted blend of elements of Blues, Country, Rock"

Silver Starling played three large Canadian Music Festivals in 2009: Osheaga, Hillside, and the Toronto Virgin Fest.

The band toured in September 2009 in Quebec and Ontario to promote their upcoming album. They played the 2009 CMJ Music Marathon in New York, M for Montreal in November 2009 and SXSW in March 2010.

On February 26, 2010, Silver Starling premiered their video for "Closer" on Spinner Magazine and were nominated in the Freshman Video category at mtvU online, alongside Jonsi from Sigur Ros.

The UK band Band of Skulls added Silver Starling as an opener for their 2010 cross-Canada tour. Drummer Liam O'neill left the band shortly before tour and was temporarily replaced by Mike Shulha.

The band announced its amicable dissolution on its Facebook page on April 28, 2015.

Paquin subsequently produced albums for Reuben and the Dark (un love), The Weather Station (Ignorance), Sarah Harmer (Are You Gone), Tim Baker (Forever Overhead), Stars (From Capelton Hill) and Julia Jacklin (Pre Pleasure) before releasing his debut solo album Our Love in November 2022.

== Members ==
- Marcus Paquin - Vocals, Guitar
- Marika Anthony-Shaw - Violin, Viola, Keyboards, Glockenspiel
- Peter X - Bass, Banjo
- Gab Lambert - Guitar, Banjo, Mandolin

== Discography ==
=== Albums ===
- Silver Starling (2009)
