= There Is No Love in Fluorescent Light =

Studio album by Stars
- Released: October 13, 2017
- Recorded: Montreal; Connecticut
- Genre: Indie pop, synth-pop, dream pop
- Length: 50:41
- Label: Last Gang
- Producer: Peter Katis

Stars chronology
No One Is Lost (2014)	There Is No Love in Fluorescent Light (2017)	From Capelton Hill (2022)

Professional ratings
Aggregate scores
Source	Rating
Metacritic	79/100
Review scores
Source	Rating
AllMusic	4/5 stars
Exclaim!	9/10
Pitchfork	7.2/10
PopMatters	7/10

There Is No Love in Fluorescent Light is the eighth studio album by Canadian band Stars. It is the follow-up album to No One Is Lost, in 2014. It was released on October 13, 2017.

== Background ==
The band released a statement about the album, saying "Does no one fall in love under fluorescent light? Pretty sure that's not true, as many an office romance could attest. But as a statement in support of love's delusions, we will stand by it. In love, the lights are different, softer; the air has more oxygen in it; and for a second, all you need is a good chorus to believe this might be the one."

== Singles ==
"Privilege" and "We Called It Love" were released as singles from the album.

== Track listing ==
No.	Title	Length
1.	"Privilege"	4:26
2.	"Fluorescent Light"	3:48
3.	"Losing to You"	6:21
4.	"Hope Avenue"	3:15
5.	"Alone"	5:06
6.	"We Called It Love"	3:54
7.	"Real Thing"	3:34
8.	"The Gift of Love"	3:32
9.	"On the Hills"	4:05
10.	"The Maze"	4:59
11.	"California, I Love That Name"	3:41
12.	"Wanderers"	4:00

== Charts ==
Chart (2017)	Peak position
Canadian Albums (Billboard)	70
