= Evan Cranley =

Canadian musician

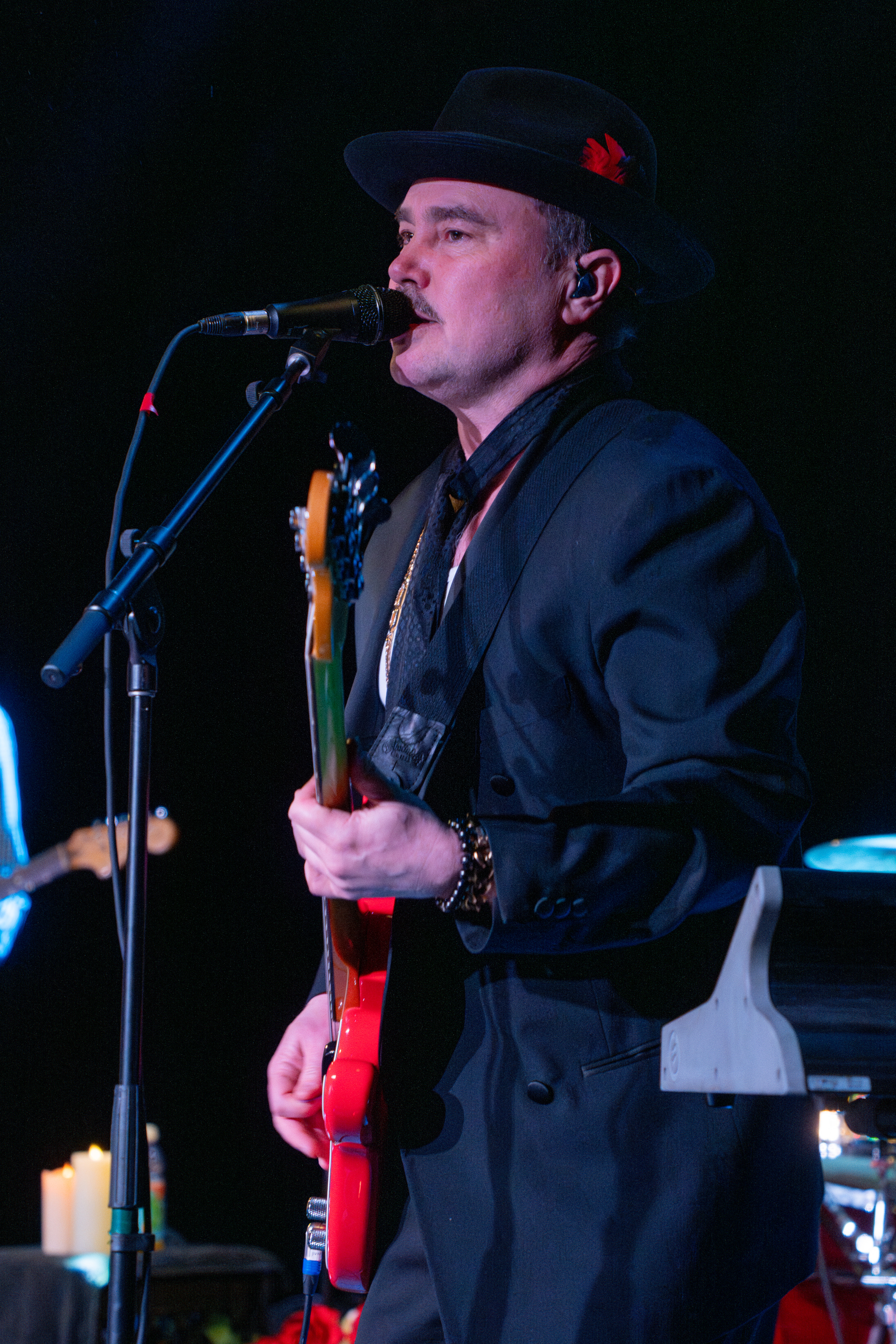
- Cranley performing with Stars in 2025

Background information
- Origin: Montreal, Quebec, Canada
- Occupation: Instrumentalist
- Instruments: Bass, guitar, percussion, mandolin, trombone

Evan Whitney Cranley is a Canadian musician based in Montreal, Quebec. Born September 15, he records with the bands Stars and Broken Social Scene, although he considered joining the band Metric before finally joining Stars.

== Musical career ==
Early on, Cranley was in the band The Universe of Forums. In the 1990s, he was the trombonist for the Toronto-based band Gypsy Soul (later Gypsy Sol). He was also a part of Big Rude Jake's back-up band in the late 1990s (he later quit, stating there are only so many shows one can do dancing around in a flesh-coloured zoot suit with a trombone).

Cranley was one of the original line-up of Broken Social Scene after the band was expanded from the core members Kevin Drew and Brendan Canning. One of the songs on their first release, Feel Good Lost, is named after him ("Cranley's Gonna Make It"). He is a contributor to all Broken Social Scene albums in various capacities. In live performances with Broken Social Scene, he usually plays trombone or guitar. He was also a contributor to the original lineup of Canning's pre-BSS project Cookie Duster.

Cranley, along with Chris Seligman, is the main composer of Stars' music. The band was formed by Seligman and Torquil Campbell in the late nineties, and Cranley was approached to join the band when it expanded. (He was also approached with an offer from Metric, a band containing Broken Social Scene bandmates Emily Haines and James Shaw). Cranley and Seligman's compositional style is to repeat a riff or tune until something develops, and then Campbell and Amy Millan will write lyrics. He is most often seen playing bass and guitars during live performances. Cranley does string arrangement on the song, "My Favorite Book" and also does bass, guitars, percussion, mandolin and many other instruments for the band's album In Our Bedroom After the War, released in 2007.

Cranley played various instruments on bandmate and wife Amy Millan's solo debut, Honey From the Tombs.

Cranley has recently been involved with Montreal hip-hop act Da Gryptions alongside friends from the music scene. They released a single in the summer of 2010 that was an ode to the Montreal public bike system BIXI Montréal.
