= The Five Ghosts =

Studio album by Stars
- Released: June 21, 2010
- Genres: Indie pop, baroque pop, electropop
- Length: 38:54
- Language: English
- Labels: Soft Revolution (Canada), Vagrant (worldwide)

Stars chronology
Sad Robots (2008)	The Five Ghosts (2010)	The North (2012)

Professional ratings
Review scores
Source	Rating
Allmusic	3/5 stars
The A.V. Club	(B−)
Paste	(8.6/10)
Pitchfork Media	(5.7/10)
Popmatters	7/10 stars
Slant Magazine	2.5/5 stars
sputnikmusic	4/5 stars
Clash (magazine)	7/10 stars
The Tune	(3.2/5)

The Five Ghosts is the fifth studio album by Stars, which was released worldwide on June 21, 2010, via Vagrant. In Canada, the album was released via Soft Revolution, the band's own label.

The album was named as a longlisted nominee for the 2011 Polaris Music Prize.

== Track listing ==
No.	Title	Length
1.	"Dead Hearts"	3:29
2.	"Wasted Daylight"	3:43
3.	"I Died So I Could Haunt You"	3:04
4.	"Fixed"	3:26
5.	"We Don't Want Your Body"	3:25
6.	"He Dreams He's Awake"	4:04
7.	"Changes"	4:13
8.	"The Passenger"	4:17
9.	"The Last Song Ever Written"	3:17
10.	"How Much More"	2:56
11.	"Winter Bones"	3:00

Bonus tracks
No.	Title	Length
1.	"You Do It to Me and I Do It to You Too" (iTunes pre-order only)
2.	"Asleep" (Limited Edition 7" box set exclusive, also available as part of the compilation, "Sing Me To Sleep: Indie Lullabies")

Those who pre-ordered the album received a bonus EP entitled The Séance, featuring songs from sessions for The Five Ghosts. The Séance EP songs are also available as individual tracks through iTunes.

The Séance
No.	Title	Length
1.	"Opinions Versus the Sun" (Stars vs. The Album Leaf)	4:17
2.	"The Five Ghosts"	4:04
3.	"The Black House, the Blue Sky" (Stars vs. Montag)	4:24
4.	"The Dead Beg for More" (Stars vs. Of Montreal)	5:20
