= Stars (Canadian band) =

Canadian indie rock band

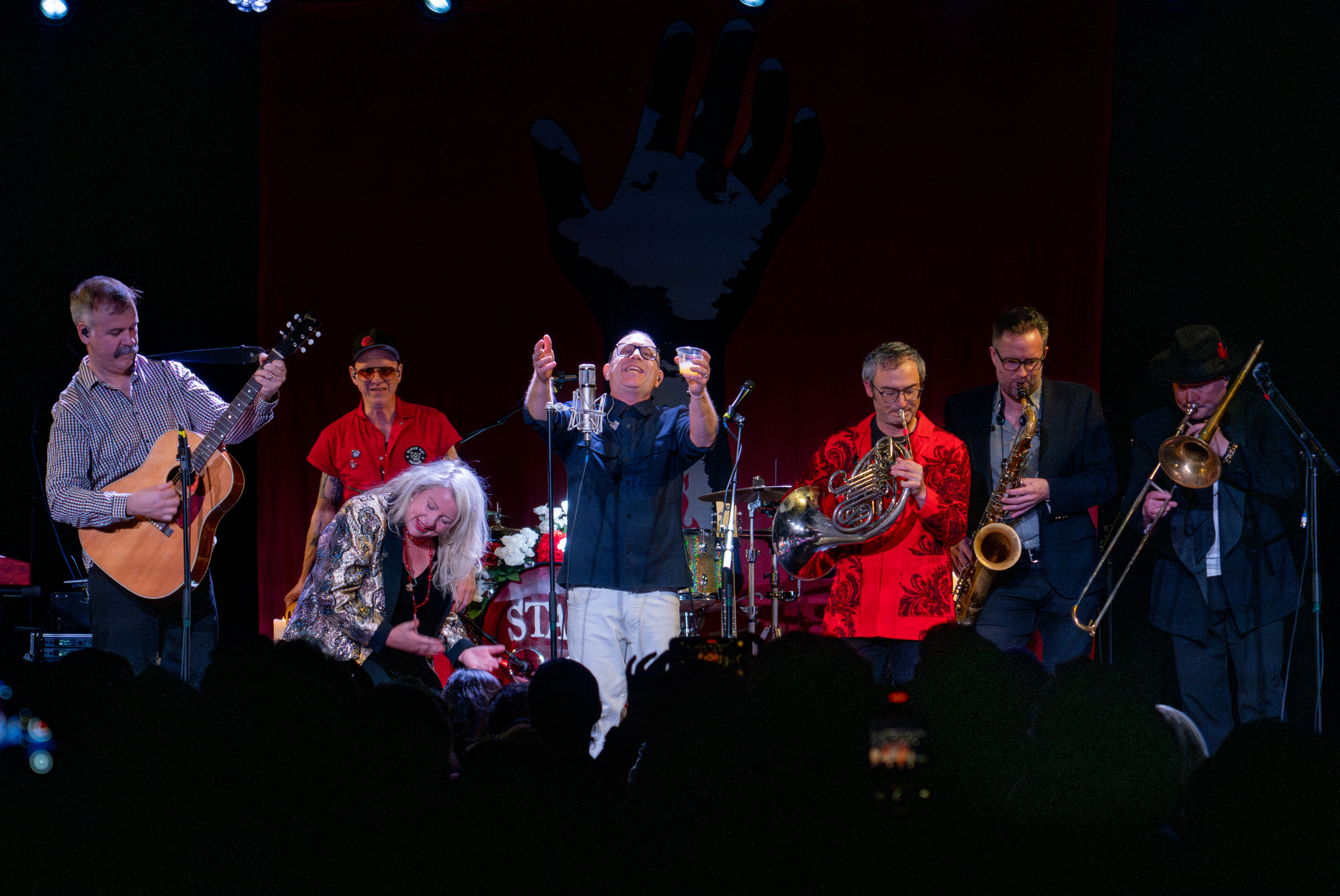
- Stars in 2025

Background information
- Genres: Indie pop; indie rock; chamber pop; new wave
- Years active: 2000–present
- Labels: ATO; Soft Revolution; Arts & Crafts; Le Grand Magistery; Paper Bag
- Members: Torquil Campbell; Amy Millan; Evan Cranley; Chris Seligman; Patrick McGee; Chris McCarron
- Website: youarestars.com

Stars is a Canadian indie pop/rock band based in Montreal, Quebec. Since forming in 2000, they have released nine albums and a number of EPs. Their music has been nominated for two Juno Awards and two Polaris Music Prizes.

== History ==
All members of Stars grew up in Toronto, Ontario. Torquil Campbell and Christopher Seligman recorded the first Stars album Nightsongs in New York in 1999. When they began to do live shows, they called in Evan Cranley, a childhood friend, to play bass. Cranley then recruited Amy Millan to be part of the band.

After a short stint in New York, the four musicians moved to Montreal and began to work on the second full-length album, Heart. In Montreal, they met Patrick McGee, who became their drummer. Heart was released on the new label Arts&Crafts, which also hosted their friends Broken Social Scene. While on their first North American tour together, Stars and Broken Social Scene shared and swapped members on a nightly basis. Heart appeared on the !earshot National Top 50 chart in March 2003, and won critical acclaim.

Stars rented a house in the Eastern Townships in the middle of winter. For a month and a half, the five of them lived together and wrote Set Yourself on Fire. It was recorded at Studio Plateau in Montreal and was produced by the band and Tom McFall. The record received good reviews, and, along with the band's live performances, established them on the national indie rock scene in Canada.

The A.V. Club wrote that Stars "work through a mutual affection for the dazzlingly clean synthetics of clever '80s technopop purveyors like OMD and Berlin". The band have cited other influences, including Berlioz, Outkast, Paddy McAloon, New Order, the Smiths, Brian Wilson, and Momus. They covered the Smiths' "This Charming Man" on 2001's Nightsongs and the Pogues' "Fairytale of New York" in 2005. Other indie artists have been guest collaborators on many of their tracks, especially for an early period including the release of their first LP.

Anticipating that their album In Our Bedroom After the War would leak at some point between the final mixing and the official release, Stars was one of the first bands to make their album available in digital form the day after it was completed on July 10, 2007. The CD release included a bonus DVD, a film called Are We Here Now, consisting of interviews with the band and the band's close friends as well as live performances around the globe; it was directed by Anthony Seck.

Meanwhile, Campbell was also an active member of the band Memphis. Millan has released two solo albums, Honey from the Tombs in 2006 and Masters of the Burial in 2009.

On September 1, 2008, the band released the EP Sad Robots.

Their single "Celebration Guns" is the title song for the television series ZOS: Zone of Separation and was provided for free as part of a collaboration with Moms Against Climate Change.

Stars have covered the Smiths' "Asleep" for American Laundromat Records' charity CD Sing Me to Sleep – Indie Lullabies. The CD was released worldwide in May 2010.

In June 2010, the band released their fifth studio album, The Five Ghosts. In Canada, the album was released via Soft Revolution, the band's own new label. It has been distributed worldwide via Vagrant Records.

The band's sixth studio album, The North, was released on September 4, 2012, via ATO Records. It was promoted by offering a free download of the first single "The Theory of Relativity" in exchange for signing up for the band's official e-mail list.

Stars performed at the 2013 Coachella Valley Music and Arts Festival as well as the Field Trip Arts & Crafts Music Festival, celebrating the tenth anniversary of their label Arts & Crafts Productions.

The band released their seventh album, No One Is Lost, in October 2014. Chris McCarron, formerly of Land of Talk, officially joined the band as the lead guitarist; he had previously contributed to The North and toured with the band.

Stars were on the line-up for the WayHome festival in the summer of 2016, north of Toronto.

On January 1, 2017, the band was part of CBC's The Strombo Show's Hip 30. Various Canadian bands covered songs from The Tragically Hip to commemorate the Hip's 30th anniversary.

Stars released their eighth album, There Is No Love in Fluorescent Light, produced by Peter Katis, on October 13, 2017, on Last Gang Records worldwide.

== Musical style and influence ==
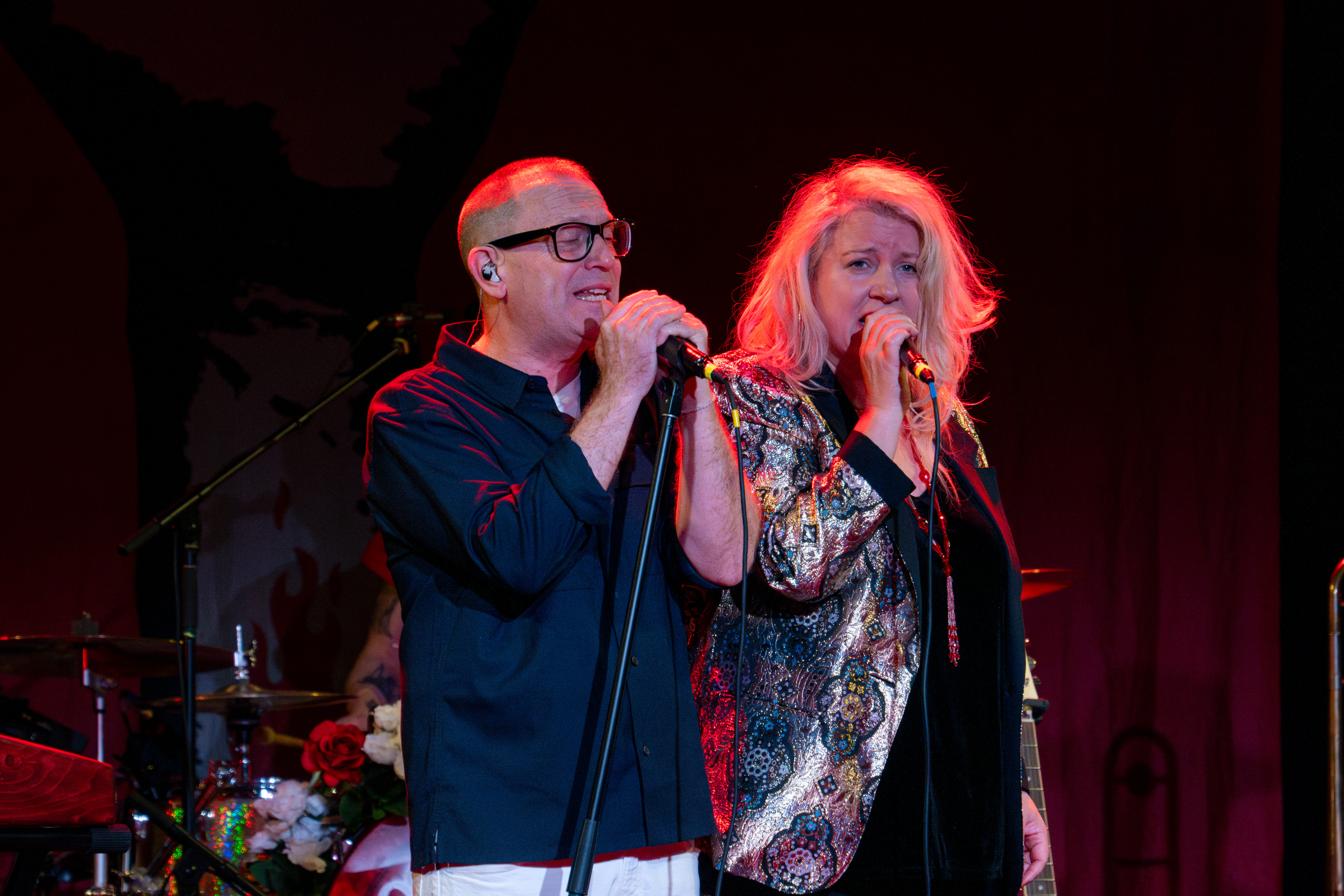
Torquil Campbell and Amy Millan performing with Stars in 2025

Stars' music has been described as "beautiful, eloquent indie pop", characterized by lush instrumentation, nimble production and mixing, narrative lyrics, and soft but nuanced vocals. The band's style has evolved from an electronic-pop sound as heard on Nightsongs (released on Le Grand Magistery record label) to more rock-based instrumentation on their following three full-length albums, reflecting the permanent additions of singer-guitarist Amy Millan and bassist Evan Cranley on Heart (released on Paper Bag Records), and eventually drummer Patrick McGee on Set Yourself on Fire.

Their songs have been featured on Queer as Folk, Alias, The O.C., Warehouse 13, Degrassi: The Next Generation, Gossip Girl, One Tree Hill, The Vampire Diaries, Skins, Continuum, Chuck, One Week, indie film Tanner Hall (2009), Studio C, and the 2011 film Like Crazy. Their music is also featured in the software-based artwork I Want You to Want Me (2007), by American artist Jonathan Harris.

== Band members ==
- Torquil Campbell – lead vocals, synthesizer, melodica (2000–present)
- Chris Seligman – keyboards, French horn, backing vocals (2000–present)
- Evan Cranley – bass, guitar, backing vocals (2000–present)
- Amy Millan – lead vocals, keyboards, guitar (2000–present)
- Pat McGee – drums, percussion (2003–present)
- Chris McCarron – guitar (2014–present)

== Discography ==
- Nightsongs (2001)
- Heart (2003)
- Set Yourself on Fire (2004)
- In Our Bedroom After the War (2007)
- The Five Ghosts (2010)
- The North (2012)
- No One Is Lost (2014)
- There Is No Love in Fluorescent Light (2017)
- From Capelton Hill (2022)

== Awards ==
=== Juno nominations ===
Stars have received two Juno nominations throughout their career:

Year	Nominee / work	Award	Result
2004	Heart	Alternative Album of the Year	Nominated
2005	Set Yourself on Fire	Alternative Album of the Year	Nominated

=== Polaris Music Prizes ===
The band has received two Polaris nominations:

Year	Nominee / work	Award	Result
2008	In Our Bedroom After the War	Polaris Music Prize	Nominated
2011	The Five Ghosts	Polaris Music Prize	Nominated

== Television appearances ==
- Live! At the Rehearsal Hall
- Late Night with Conan O'Brien
- Late Night with Jimmy Fallon
