= Christian Hjelm =

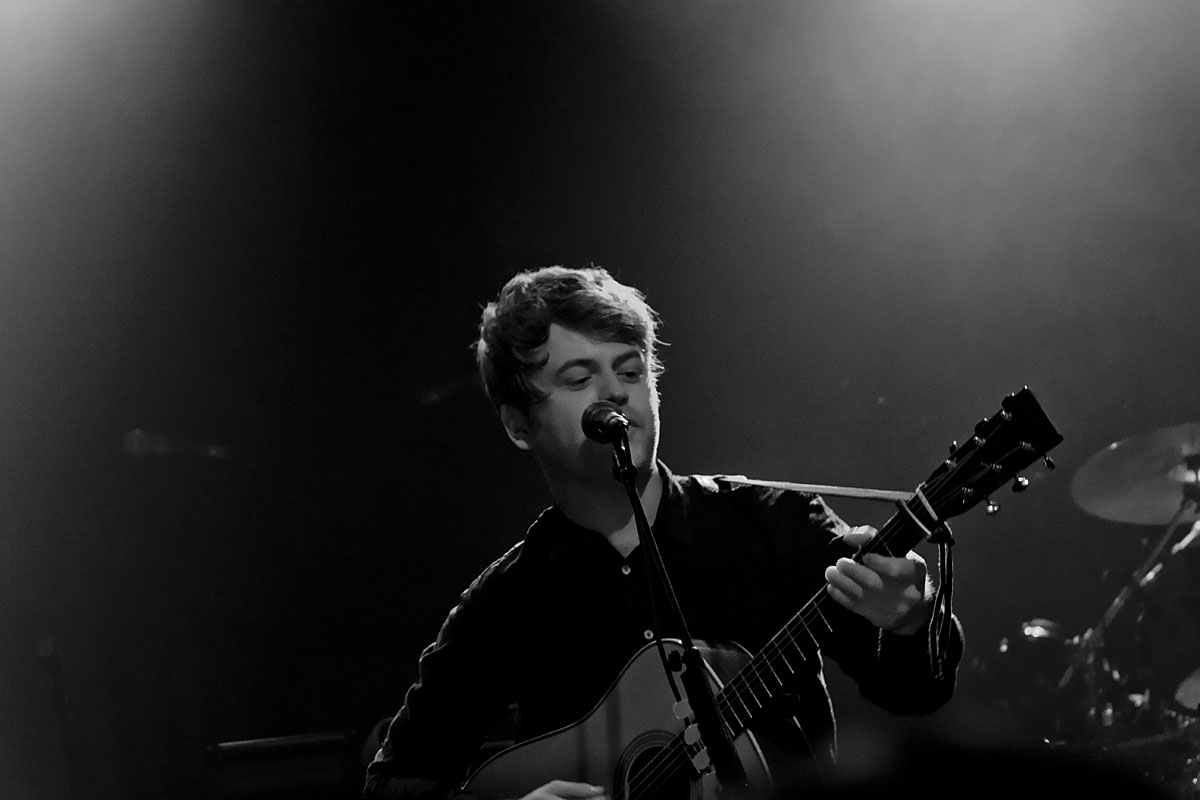

Background information
- Born: Vestbjerg, Nordjylland, Denmark
- Genres: Pop, indie-pop
- Occupations: Singer, songwriter, record producer, musician
- Instruments: Vocals, guitar
- Years active: 2004 – present
- Label: Playground Music
- Website: christianhjelm.dk

Christian Hjelm originating from Vestbjerg, Nordjylland, Denmark is a Danish singer and guitar player who has developed a solo career and has released a number of singles and had his debut album Før Vi Blev Lette recorded at Studio-R in Copenhagen and released on 3 September 2012 on Playground Music record label.

He is most famous for being the vocalist and guitar player for the Danish indie rock-band Figurines that has released four studio albums and 3 EPs.

On 22 November 2008, Christian Hjelm gave a live concert in tribute to The Beatles' White Album and called his own concert "The White Concert" that included "Martha My Dear" from the Beatles. In 2012, he collaborated with Nikolaj Nørlund in the album Alt sammen, lige nu.

== Discography ==
=== Albums ===
Solo

Year	Album	Peak position	Certifications	Notes
Year	Album	DEN	Certifications	Notes
2012	Før Vi Blev Lette	5		
2014	Vaskeægte	7		

with Figurines

- 2004: Shake a Mountain
- 2005: Skeleton
- 2007: When the Deer Wore Blue (DEN No. 20 in Danish Albums Chart)
- 2010: Figurines

=== Singles ===
- 2012: "Lang vej igen" / "Scenen skifter nu"
