= The Constant Lover =

The Constant Lover may refer to:

== Theatre ==
- The Constant Lover, play by St. John Emile Clavering Hankin first performed posthumously in February 1912

== Music ==
- The Constant Lover, tune from the Dancing Master, 1719
- "The Constant Lover", by Steve Tilston traditional
- "The Constant Lover", by Magneta Lane
- "The Constant Lover", from Jayne Mansfield: Shakespeare, Tchaikovsky & Me
- The Constant Lover (EP)
