= Remix Romance Vol. 2 =

Remix album by Sally Shapiro
- Released: June 17, 2008
- Recorded: 2007–2008
- Genre: Italo disco
- Length: 62:14
- Label: Paper Bag Records
- Producer: Johan Agebjörn

Sally Shapiro chronology
| Remix Romance Vol. 1 (2008) | Remix Romance Vol. 2 (2008) | My Guilty Pleasure (2009) |

Professional ratings
Review scores
| Source | Rating |
|---|---|
| Allmusic | link |

Remix Romance Vol. 2 is a remix compilation album by Sally Shapiro. Like its predecessor Remix Romance Vol. 1, it collects previously existing and newly produced versions of tracks from Disco Romance. This collection includes remixes from Dntel, The Russian Futurists, Solvent, and famed Italo disco producer Alexander Robotnick.

== Track listing ==
All tracks written by Johan Agebjörn except where stated.

1. "Time to Let Go (CFCF Remix)" — 5:19
2. "I Know (SLL Remix)" — 7:16
3. "Find My Ghost (Dntel Remix)" — 4:32
4. "Skating in the Moonshine (Solvent Remix)" — 5:33
5. "I'll Be By Your Side (Russian Futurists Remix)" — 2:53
6. "Time to Let Go (Spitzer Remix) — 5:16
7. "Anorak Christmas (Alexander Robotnick Remix)" (Roger Gunnarsson) — 6:26
8. "Hold Me So Tight (Dyylan Remix)" — 4:50
9. "Find My Soul (Johan Agebjörn's Norwegian Electrojazz Mix)" — 4:59
10. "Jackie Jackie (Dyylan's Subzero Nocturne)" (Gunnarsson/Agebjörn) — 4:45

iTunes bonus tracks

1. "I'll Be by Your Side (Grahm Zilla Remix)" — 5:26
2. "I Know (KoolTURE and Diego Puerta Remix)" — 5:02

== Personnel and credits ==
=== Personnel ===
- Sally Shapiro — Vocals
- Johan Agebjörn — Original production, backing vocals
- Evelina Joëlson — Backing vocals on original versions of "Anorak Christmas", "Jackie Jackie", and "Skating in the Moonshine"
- Anna Sanne Göransson — Backing vocals on original versions of "Jackie Jackie" and "Skating in the Moonshine"

=== Credits ===
Compilation selection by Sally Shapiro and Johan Agebjörn.
