= Dear Frederic =

Canadian musician

- Origin: Montreal, Quebec, Canada
- Genre: Synthpop
- Years active: 2014–present
- Label: Cult Nation
- Members: Charles F. Huot
- Website: www.thecultnation.com/dear_frederic/en/

Charles F. Huot (born May 13, 1981) is a Montreal-based Canadian producer and songwriter best known by the stage name Dear Frederic.

The live band consists of drummer Julien Blais (Coeur de Pirate), multi-instrumentalist Danny Lutz and Huot singing and playing guitar and synth.

== Debut EP ==
In April 2014, Huot released on Montreal based label Cult Nation his first EP, Outlast. The sound of these five tracks moves away from his former band Winter Gloves' pop-rock sound and explores the '80's synthpop era.

For his single "Outlast", the singer partnered up with musician and producer Tim Buron (Tork) and Husser (The Posterz) for a remix which is part of a Coke Zero advertisement: City of Possibilities. The ad aired on Mexican television and in a digital version on YouTube. Music from the EP was also used in Killjoys.

== Beginning ==
Huot began his career as a singer and songwriter in 2008 with the Winter Gloves. Signed with Paper Bag Records in Toronto. The pop-rock group toured internationally with Huot at its lead.

The artist also created music that will be used in Canadian series such as Degrassi: The Next Generation, Tout sur moi, Castle, So You Think You Can Dance.
