= Van der Vleuten =

van der Vleuten is a Dutch surname. Notable bearers include:

- Jos van der Vleuten (1943–2011), cyclist
- Maarten van der Vleuten (born 1967), record producer
- Maikel van der Vleuten (born 1988), show jumper rider

== See also ==
- Annemiek van Vleuten (born 1982), cyclist
