= Let It Show =

"Let It Show" may refer to

- "Let It Show", song by Flavor Flav from the album Flavor Flav, 2006
- "Let It Show", a song by Moka Only and Chief from Crickets, 2011
- "Let It Show", song by Riot from Through the Storm, 2002
- "Let It Show", song by John Schlitt from Shake, 1995
- "Let It Show", song by Sally Shapiro from My Guilty Pleasure, 2009
- "Let It Show", song by Teenage Head from Some Kinda Fun, 1982
- "Let It Show", song by Tyga from Careless World: Rise of the Last King, 2012
