= Wolfram (musician) =

Austrian musician

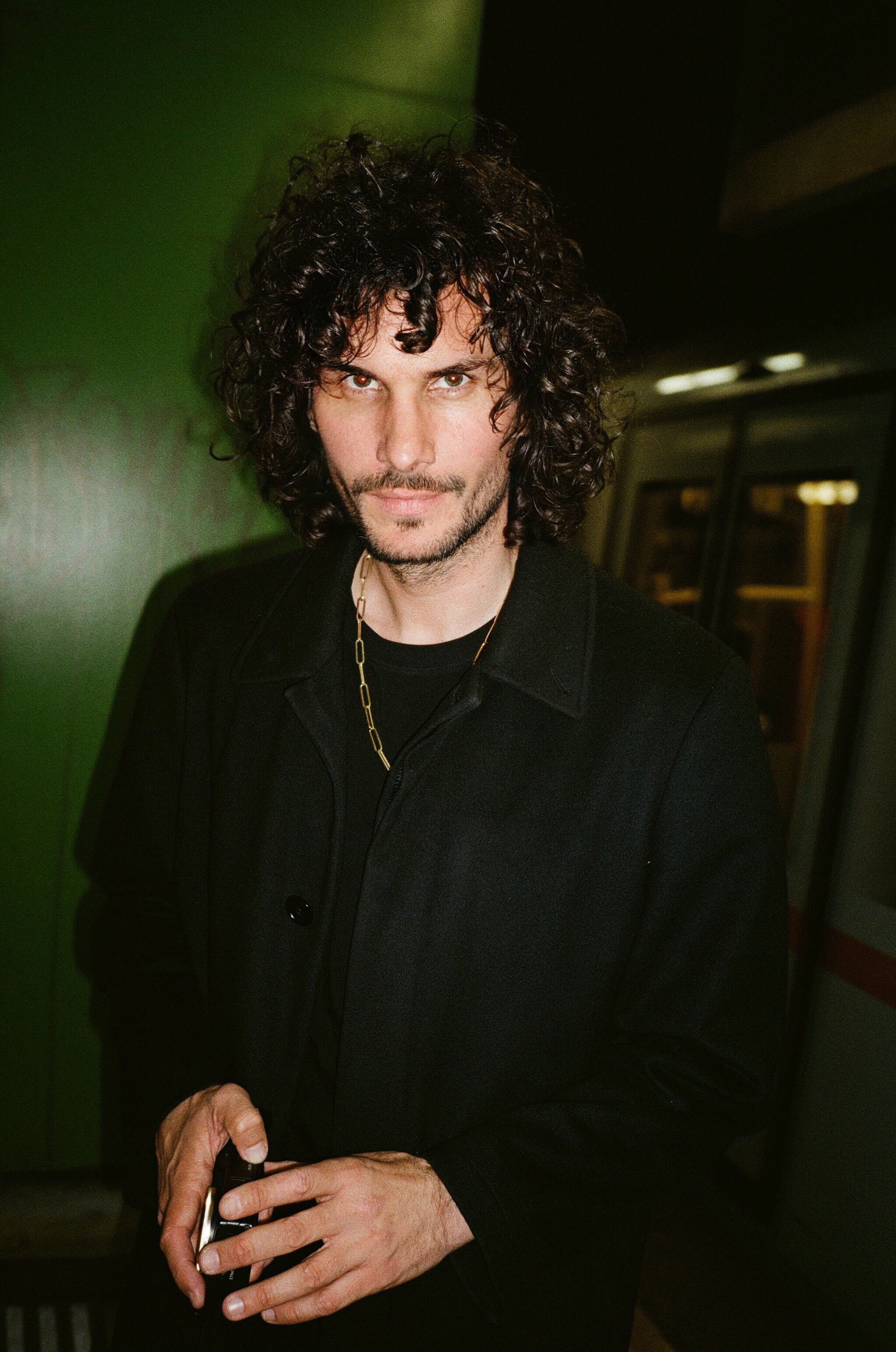

Background information
- Born: Wolfram Eckert; 1983 (age 42–43)
- Origin: Carinthia, Austria
- Genres: Eurodance
- Occupations: Disc Jockey, record producer

Wolfram Eckert (born in 1983 in St. Veit an der Glan, Austria), known professionally as Wolfram, is an Austrian electronic dance music disc jockey and record producer. His style includes Italo disco and Eurodance and he is known as a DJ in the fashion industry. He also works under the alias Diskokaine.

== Career ==
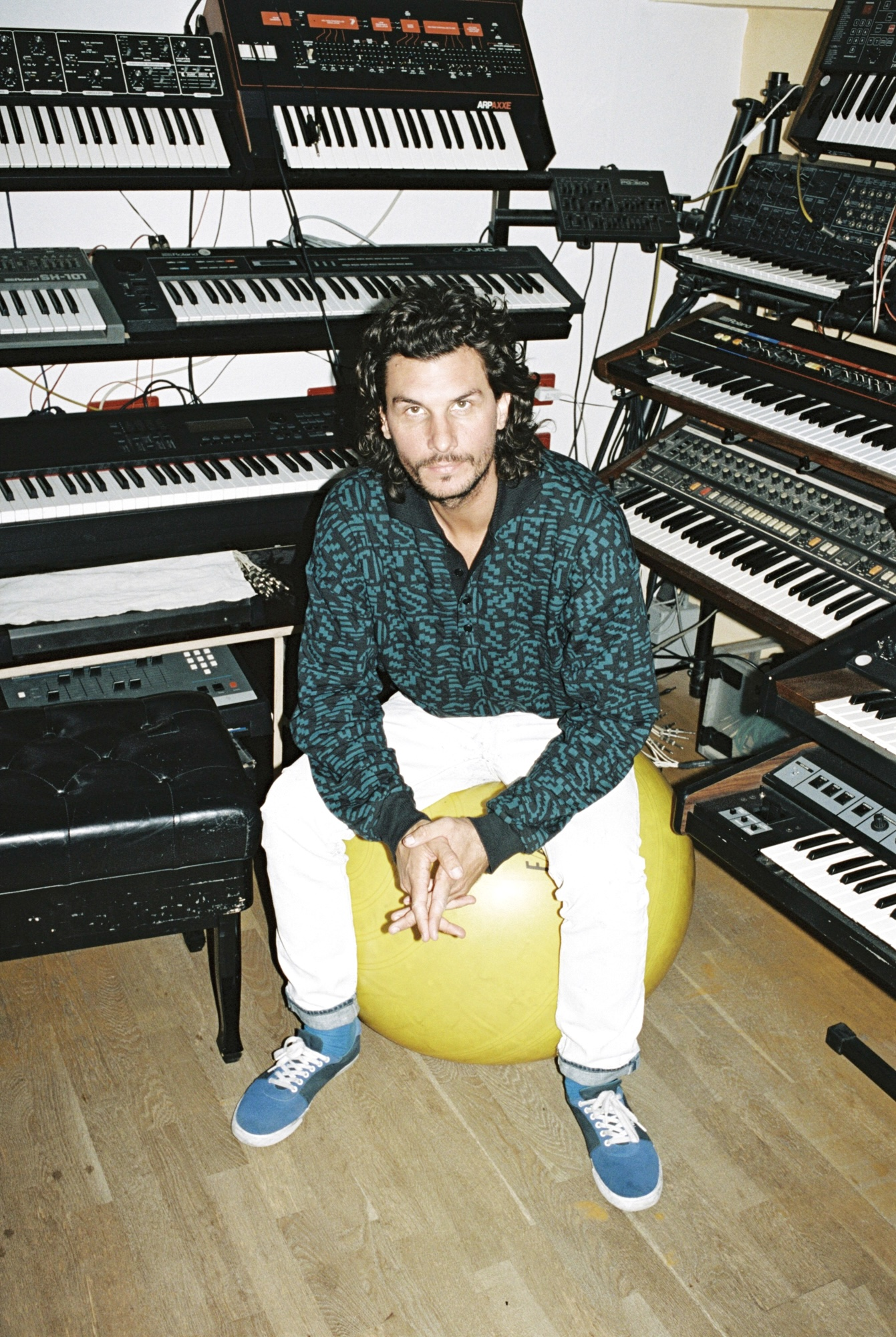

Wolfram grew up in Carinthia near the Austrian-Italian border. His father played a role in his musical development, introducing him to classic electronic music artists like Kraftwerk and Jean-Michel Jarre. After completing his education in Austria, Wolfram moved to Vienna to study sound engineering at The SAE Institute, in addition to studying digital media at the Academy of Fine Arts Vienna.

Wolfram's career took off in New York, where his DJ sets gained attention for their blend of Italo disco and Chicago house sounds. This period saw him collaborate with artists like Princess Superstar and Legowelt, as well as executively producing the debut album for Sally Shapiro, Disco Romance, which was praised by Pitchfork and introduced a neo-Italo sound. Contributing to the rise of his early career was Wolfram's 2008 remix of the Moby track Disco Lies, produced under the alias Diskokaine.

Wolfram released his self-titled debut album, Wolfram, in 2011 on the Permanent Vacation record label. It featured collaborations with artists including Haddaway and Paul Parker. In 2019, Wolfram released his second studio album, Amadeus, which featured contributions from Peaches, Pamela Anderson and Falco.

Beyond producing music, Wolfram has performed live DJ sets at several events and venues, including Circoloco in Ibiza and New York clubs. He has also played private events, such as Grace Jones’ birthday and Moby's 50th birthday celebrations. He has performed DJ sets at fashion events, including performing at shows for Gucci, Balenciaga, and Vivienne Westwood. In 2023, he collaborated with Zalando for their campaign, "Make Your Own Moment".

=== Awards and recognition ===
In 2012 Wolfram was nominated for an Amadeus Austrian Music Award in the Electronic/Dance category.
