= Gambling with God =

Studio album by Magneta Lane
- Released: 15 September 2009
- Genre: Indie Rock, Alternative Rock
- Length: 37:34
- Label: Last Gang (Canada); Universal Records (US)
- Producer: Jon Drew

Magneta Lane chronology
Dancing with Daggers (2006)	Gambling with God (2009)

Professional ratings
Review scores
Source	Rating
CHARTattack	3/5 stars
Off the Dial	(favorable)
Pitchfork Media	(6.8/10.0)
The Torontoist	(favorable)

Gambling with God is the second studio album by the Canadian indie-rock band Magneta Lane, released September 15, 2009 on Last Gang Records in Canada. Gambling with God is available in the United States for download as of November 9, 2010.

== Background ==
Lead singer Lexi Valentine said that the album "is about finding out exactly where you want to go and getting there without stopping for anything — but taking those things that matter along the way" when asked about the record. She also stated that "It's also about power, strength and heart. And being honest with yourself. The sound is hopeful, bright, and at peace with life's twists and turns."

The band self-classified the genre of the album as 'witchrock', due to the band's inability to find an accurate genre classification for the sound while recording. "We decided to make our own genre because we couldn’t figure out where we fit. We decided it sounds kind of witchy. People have said that to us before. Maybe it’s because we’re three girls. Maybe it’s something worse, I don’t know. Or care at this point." said Valentine.

After the release of their first album, Dancing with Daggers, the band felt matured enough to seek legal extrication from its first recording contract. “We were really young, and at the time we were just excited to be signed so we really didn’t ask a lot of questions,” Valentine mentioned. The band went in search for a better deal, but did not feel taken seriously by several producers due to their young age.

== Track listing ==
1. "Lady Bones" - 3:14
2. "Violet's Constellations" - 4:20
3. "House of Mirrors" - 3:06
4. "Castles" - 4:14
5. "September Came" - 3:52
6. "Bloody French" - 3:42
7. "Love and Greed" - 4:00
8. "Gambling With God" - 3:09
9. "All the Red Feelings" - 3:53
10. "Queen of Hearts" - 4:04
11. "Shatter" - 3:22 (US Bonus Track)

== Tour ==
Magenta Lane did a surprise tour with Sloan from November 29 to December 15, 2009. They played at the following venues:

- Nov 29 – Skully’s Columbus, Ohio
- Nov 30 – Maxwell’s Hoboken, New Jersey
- Dec 1 – Jammin Java vienna, Virginia
- Dec 3 – TT’s Cambridge, Massachusetts
- Dec 4 – The Bell House Brooklyn, New York
- Dec 5 – Kung Fu Necktie Philadelphia, Pennsylvania
- Dec 6 – Grogshop Cleveland, Ohio
- Dec 7 – Lincoln Hall / ALL AGES Chicago, Illinois
- Dec 9 – Pyramid Cabaret Winnipeg, Manitoba
- Dec 10 – Louis Pub Saskatoon, Saskatchewan
- Dec 11 – The Gateway Calgary, Alberta
- Dec 12 – The Starlite Room Edmonton, Alberta
- Dec 15 – Commodore Ballroom Vancouver, British Columbia

Magneta Lane hit the road in the United States in 2011 to support the release on November 9, 2010. They performed on June 1, 2011, with Glasvegas to promote the Gambling with God album.
