= PS I Love You (band) =

Canadian indie rock band

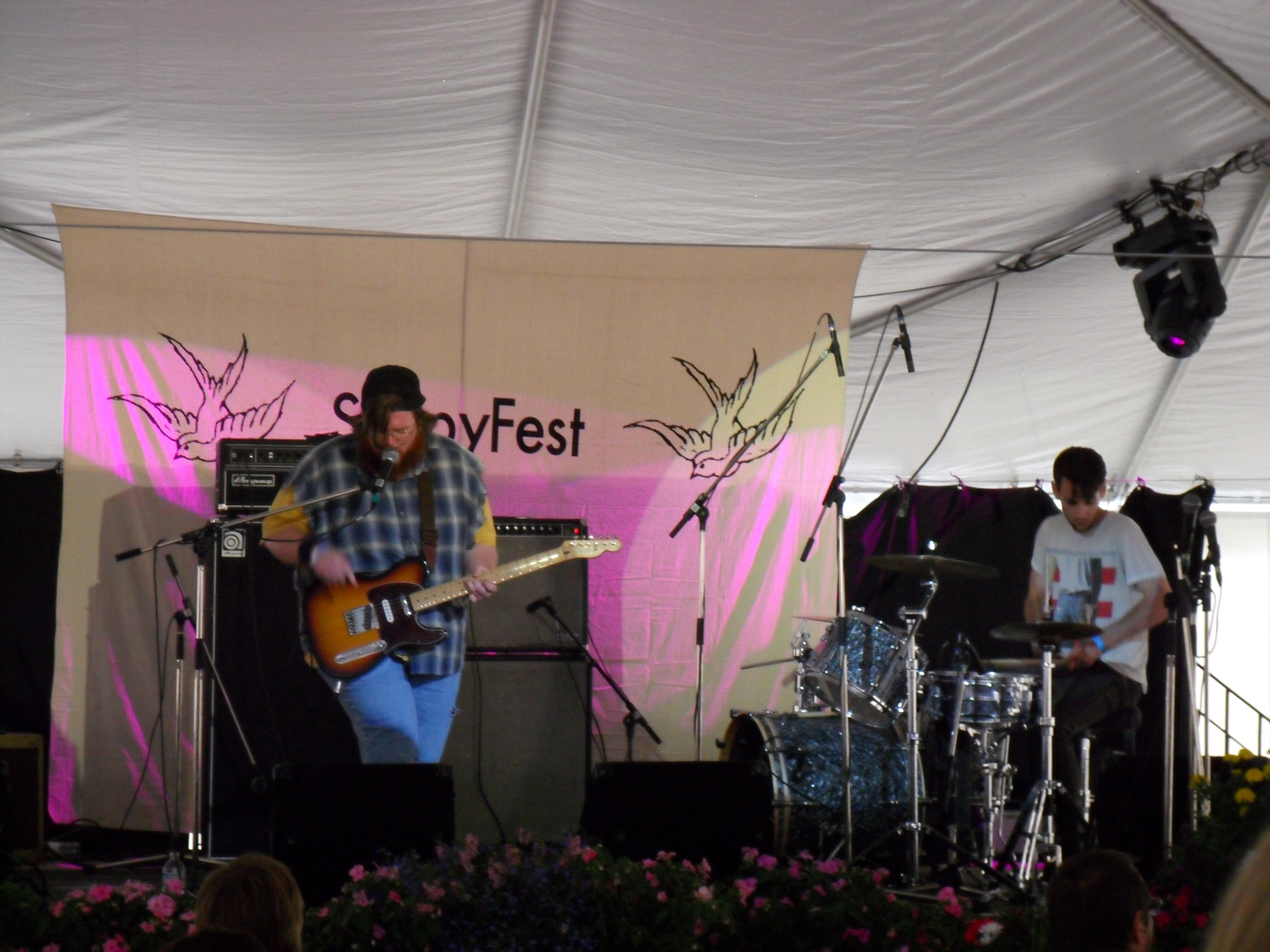
- PS I Love You (2010)

Background information
- Origin: Kingston, Ontario, Canada
- Genres: indie rock, garage rock
- Years active: 2006–present
- Labels: Paper Bag, Rocket Girl
- Members: Paul Saulnier, vocals/guitar Benjamin Nelson, drums
- Website: myspace.com/psiloveyouband

PS I Love You are a Canadian indie rock duo based in Kingston, Ontario, consisting of Paul Saulnier on vocals/guitar/bass pedals and Benjamin Nelson on drums. The band is signed to Canadian independent record label Paper Bag Records. The band is known for its forceful themes, guitar effects, and loud percussion.

== History ==
PS I Love You, a play on lead-singer and guitarist Paul Saulnier's initials, formed in Kingston, Ontario in 2006 as a solo project. Drummer Benjamin Nelson joined in 2008. Saulnier and Nelson had previously worked together in another Kingston band, Magic Jordan. The band gained notoriety as a result of a split 7-inch with artist Diamond Rings, which led to both groups gaining favourable reviews.

The band's debut album, Meet Me at the Muster Station, was released in October, 2010 to favourable reviews from Pitchfork Media, who praised the track "Facelove" as "Best New Music"., and also from Exclaim! Magazine, which included it on its list of Top Pop & Rock Albums of 2010. Meet Me at the Muster Station appeared on the !Earshot National Top 50 Chart, and was longlisted for the 2011 Polaris Music Prize.

Their second album, Death Dreams, was released on May 8, 2012, on Paper Bag Records. The record was also included on the Polaris Prize Long List.

The band released their third studio album, For Those Who Stay, on July 22, 2014, on Paperbag Records.

== Band members ==
Members

- Paul Saulnier – lead vocals, guitar, bass, bass pedals
- Benjamin Nelson – drums, percussion, backing vocals

Touring members

- Tim Bruton – bass, rhythm guitars, keyboards, backing vocals (2011–present)

== Discography ==
=== Studio albums ===
List of studio albums
Title	Album details
Meet Me at the Muster Station	Released: October 5, 2010; Label: Paper Bag Records; Formats: CD, LP, digital download
Death Dreams	Released: May 8, 2012; Label: Paper Bag Records; Formats: CD, LP, digital download
For Those Who Stay	Released: July 22, 2014; Label: Paper Bag Records; Formats: CD, LP, cassette, digital download

=== Live albums ===
List of live albums
Title	Album details
Muster Sessions	Released: February 16, 2012; Label: Paper Bag Records; Formats: digital download

=== Extended plays ===
List of extended plays
Title	Album details
EP	Released: June 1, 2008; Label: Apple Crisp Records, Paper Bag Records; Formats: CD, digital download
Diamond Rings / PS I Love You	Released: January 8, 2009; Label: Hype Lighter; Formats: CD, digital download
Starfield	Released: January 3, 2010; Label: Thing Itself Records; Formats: CD, digital download
Leftovers (ft. Diamond Rings)	Released: January 3, 2011; Label: Paper Bag Records; Formats: CD, digital download
Figure It Out (A Collection of Singles and EPs by PS I Love You)	Released: March 8, 2011; Label: Paper Bag Records; Formats: CD, digital download
