= Mappe Of =

Canadian multi-instrumentalist, songwriter, producer, and avant-folk musician

Mappe Of is the stage name of Tom Meikle (born February 26, 1993), a Canadian multi-instrumentalist, songwriter, producer, and avant-folk musician from Whitby, Ontario.

Signed to Paper Bag Records, he released his debut album A Northern Star, A Perfect Stone in 2017.

His sophomore release, The Isle of Ailynn, was a mixed-media concept record which included a VR video series made with Google Tilt Brush, released in 2019. The album was recorded at The Tragically Hip's Bathouse Studios in Bath, ON and was accompanied by nine oil paintings by Canadian artist Quinn Henderson.

== Discography ==
- "A Northern Star, A Perfect Stone"
  - Release: July 28, 2017
  - Format: CD, Digital
  - Label: Paper Bag Records

- "The Isle of Ailynn"
  - Release: November 1, 2019
  - Format: CD, Digital
  - Label: Paper Bag Records

- "Afterglades"
  - Release: September 19th, 2025
  - Format: CD, Digital
  - Label: Paper Bag Records
