= Under Byen =

Danish band

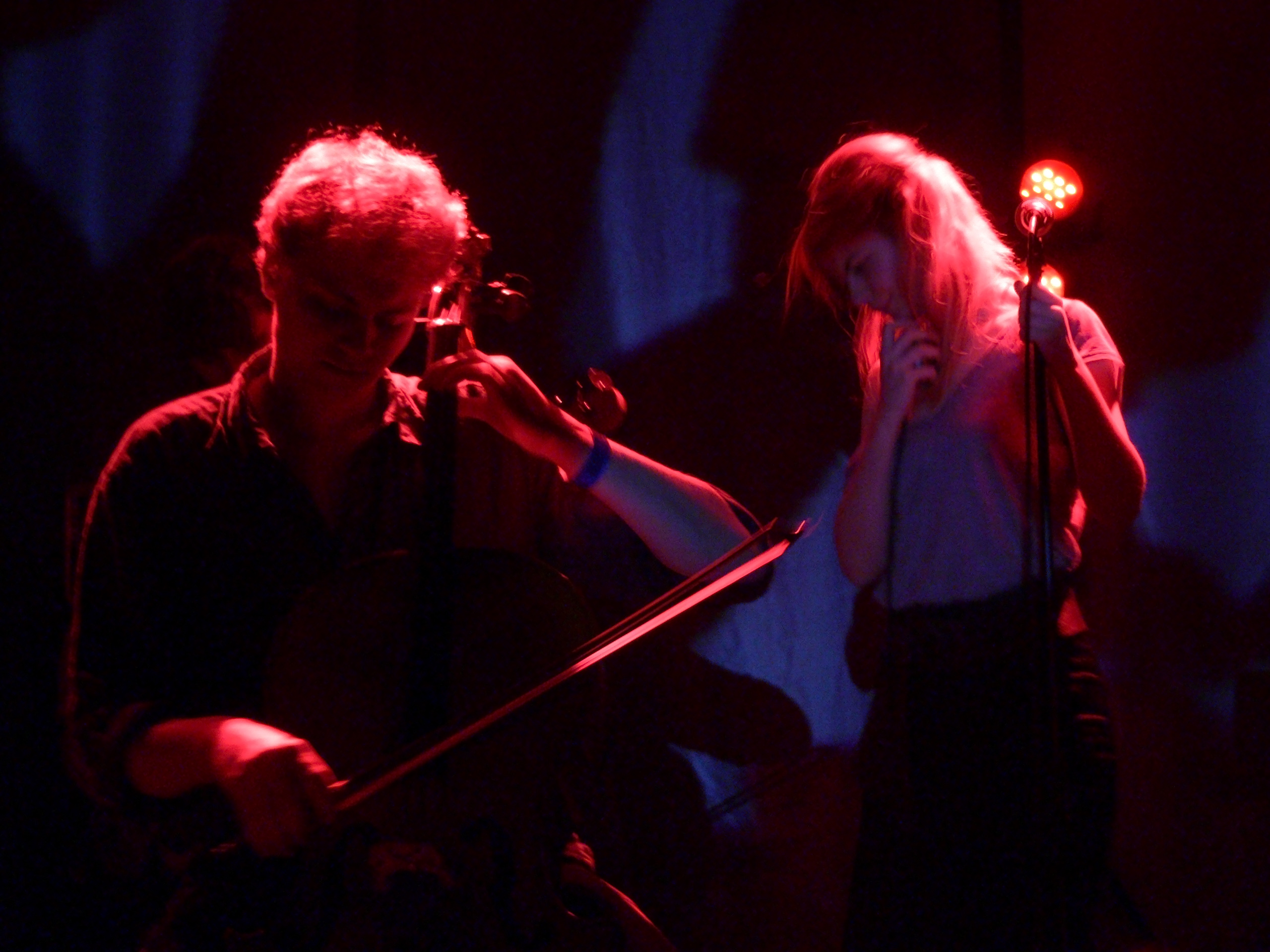
- Morten Svenstrup and Henriette Sennenvaldt of Under Byen

Background information
- Origin: Aarhus, Denmark
- Genres: Post-rock, Trip-hop, Experimental, Indie Rock, Chamber music
- Years active: 1995–2013
- Labels: Morningside, Paper Bag
- Members: Henriette Sennenvaldt; Rasmus Kjær Larsen; Nils Gröndahl; Morten Larsen; Sara Saxild; Anders Stochholm; Stine Sørensen; Morten Svenstrup
- Past members: Katrine Stochholm; Myrtha Wolf; Thorbjørn Krogshede
- Website: www.underbyen.dk

Under Byen were a Danish band founded in 1995 mainly by Katrine Stochholm and Henriette Sennenvaldt.

Under Byen (Danish for "Below the City") were known for producing their own unorthodox interpretation of rock. They rarely use guitars. Instead their soundscape is dominated by piano, cello, violin, electrically distorted saw, organ, drums and percussion. They perform a somewhat different vein of rock (or pop) spiced up with jazzy, folky and classical elements. An important part of the music are also the poetic Danish lyrics which are presented to the listener by female vocals.

The 1999 debut album Kyst impressed music critics, who applauded the band for creating their own style and tone. The second album Det er mig der holder træerne sammen (2002), which translates to ‘it’s me who holds the trees together', was equally praised and has grown to be highly acclaimed. In 2004 it was re-released outside Denmark.

In 2004 the band remixed Rammstein's 2004 Single Ohne Dich.

In 2006 the band released their album Samme stof som stof to rave reviews.

Under Byen's influences are very diverse. Lead singer Henriette Sennenvaldt has been quoted as saying she was inspired by traffic. And if Kyst would be said to have a theme it would probably be water and harbours. They rarely cite any direct musical influences, but on occasion band members have expressed their fondness for artists such as Stina Nordenstam, Björk, Tori Amos, Sigur Rós, Tom Waits, Mogwai, Mark Hollis and Talk Talk.

In 2010 the band released their fourth album, Alt Er Tabt, which translates to "all is lost." The album was released on April 6 by Paper Bag Records.

== Members ==
- Henriette Sennenvaldt – vocals, lyricist
- Rasmus Kjær Larsen – pianos
- Nils Gröndahl – violin, saw, lapsteel, a variety of guitar pedals
- Morten Larsen – drums
- Sara Saxild – bass
- Anders Stochholm – percussion, accordion, harmonica, guitar
- Stine Sørensen – drums, percussion
- Morten Svenstrup – cello

=== Former members ===
- Katrine Stochholm – composer, melodica, backing vocals, piano, lyricist
- Myrtha Wolf – cello
- Thorbjørn Krogshede – composer, piano, bass clarinet

== Discography ==
=== Albums ===
- Kyst, 1999
- Remix, 2001
- Det er mig der holder træerne sammen, 2002
- 2 ryk og en aflevering, soundtrack album, 2003
- Samme stof som stof, 2006
- Alt er tabt, 2010

=== EPs ===
- Puma, 1997
- Live at Haldern Pop, 2004
- Siamesisk, 2008
- Protokol, 2013

=== Singles ===
- "Veninde i vinden", 1998
