= Ready to Live a Lie =

Studio album by Sally Shapiro
- Released: 30 May 2025
- Studio: The Monastery Yard; The Southern Forest
- Length: 49:53
- Label: Italians Do It Better
- Producer: Johan Agebjörn

Sally Shapiro chronology
| Sad Cities (2022) | Ready to Live a Lie (2025) |

Singles from Ready to Live a Lie
- 1. "The Other Days" Released: 11 March 2025; 2. "Did You Call Tonight" Released: 1 May 2025

Ready to Live a Lie is the fifth studio album by Swedish synthpop duo Sally Shapiro. It was released on 30 May 2025, via Italians Do It Better.

== Background ==
Released three years after the duo's Sad Cities in 2022, Ready to Live a Lie is their second release on Italians Do It Better.

The album was mixed by the label's co-founder, Johnny Jewel, and Agebjörn of the duo. Described as "the duo's darkest album yet", it centers on the duo's vocalist, also known by the same name, and her struggle with personal issues involving relationship and loneliness.

"The Other Days" was released as a single on 11 March 2025. It was followed by "Did You Call Tonight", the second single, on 1 May 2025.

== Reception ==
God Is in the TV Zine scored the album eight out of ten and called it "another Sally Shapiro release that is totally worthy of three quarters of an hour of anyone’s time."

Paste remarked, "Compared to their previous albums, though, Ready to Live a Lie is more explicitly about how Sally—again: the character, not the vocalist—has been hurt and the lies she's endured, or told herself in order to soldier on," rating it 7.6 out of ten.

MusicOMH gave the album a rating of three and a half stars, stating "Ready To Live a Lie may sound almost gossamer light at times, but there are enough moments on it to provide a melancholic soundtrack to the summer."

Beats Per Minute assigned it a score of sixty-nine percent, referring to it as "a reluctant but delicate embrace of sadness and heartache."

Professional ratings
Review scores
| Source | Rating |
|---|---|
| Beats Per Minute | 69% |
| MusicOMH | 3.5/5 stars |
| Paste | 7.6/10 |
| God Is in the TV | 8/10 |

== Track listing ==
Ready to Live a Lie track listing
| No. | Title | Writer(s) | Length |
|---|---|---|---|
| 1. | "The Other Days" | Johan Agebjörn; Roger Gunnarsson; Mikael Ögren | 4:12 |
| 2. | "Hard to Love" | Agebjörn; Elizabeth Morphew | 4:51 |
| 3. | "Rent" | Neil Tennant; Chris Lowe | 5:37 |
| 4. | "Purple Colored Sky" | Agebjörn | 4:48 |
| 5. | "Happier Somewhere Else" | Agebjörn | 3:46 |
| 6. | "Guarding Shell" | Agebjörn | 5:20 |
| 7. | "Hospital" | Gunnarsson | 3:03 |
| 8. | "Did You Call Tonight" | Agebjörn; Gunnarson; Sally Shapiro; Ögren | 4:40 |
| 9. | "Oh Carrie" | Agebjörn; Gunnarson | 3:21 |
| 10. | "He's Not You" | Agebjörn; Gunnarson | 4:13 |
| 11. | "Rain" | Agebjörn; Miranda Gjerstad | 5:02 |
| Total length: | | | 49:53 |

Physical edition bonus tracks
| No. | Title | Writer(s) | Length |
|---|---|---|---|
| 12. | "Casablanca Nights" | Agebjörn; Gunnarson; Steve Moore | 4:01 |
| 13. | "Le Noir Et Le Blanc Sur Le Piano" | Gunnarson; Agebjörn; Myleen Offrell; Maria Sandström | 4:11 |
| 14. | "Forget About You" (Johnny Jewel's Amnesia Rework) | Agebjörn; Gunnarson; Johnny Jewel | 4:21 |
| 15. | "The Best Thing" | Austin Garrick | 3:50 |

== Personnel ==
Credits adapted from the album's liner notes.

=== Sally Shapiro ===
- Sally Shapiro – vocals
- Johan Agebjörn – production, mixing, backing vocals on "Casablanca Nights"

=== Additional contributors ===
- Steve Moore – production on "Casablanca Nights", guitar on "Le Noir Et Le Blanc Sur Le Piano"
- Mikael Ögren – co-production on "The Other Days" and "Did You Call Tonight"
- Johnny Jewel – mixing, remixing on "Forget About You", additional drums on "Le Noir Et Le Blanc Sur Le Piano", front cover artwork, vinyl artwork
- Roger Gunnarson – falsetto vocals on "Did You Call Tonight"
- Mike Bozzi – mastering
- Frida Klingberg – front cover photography
- Mathias Schukert – front cover artwork
- Lasse Nilson – vinyl artwork
