= Alt er tabt =

Studio album by Under Byen
- Released: 18 May 2010
- Genre: Post-rock
- Length: 40:00
- Label: Paper Bag Records

Under Byen chronology
Samme stof som stof (2006)	Alt er tabt (2010)

Alt er tabt is an album by Under Byen released in 2010. Alt er tabt means "all is lost" in Danish. It was described by Pitchfork as a "dark, tense record full of spartan arrangements and songs built more around moody atmosphere than melodic hooks."

== Track listing ==
All tracks by Under Byen

1. "8" – 2:09
2. "Territorium" – 3:49
3. "Alt Er Tabt" – 3:43
4. "Således" – 3:09
5. "Ikke Latteren Men Øjeblikket Lige Efter" – 3:27
6. "Unoder" – 5:49
7. "Konstant" – 5:21
8. "Er Noget Smukt Glemt Findes Det Muligvis Endnu" – 4:15
9. "Kapitel 1" – 4:08
10. "Protokol" – 3:25

== Personnel ==
- Henriette Sennenvaldt – vocals, lyricist
- Rasmus Kjær Larsen – pianos
- Nils Gröndahl – violin, saw, lapsteel, a variety of guitar pedals
- Morten Larsen – drums
- Sara Saxild – bass
- Anders Stochholm – percussion, accordion, harmonica, guitar
- Stine Sørensen – drums, percussion
- Morten Svenstrup – cello
