= Paper Bag Records =

Canadian independent record label

- Founded: 2002
- Distributors: Outside Music (Can); The Orchard (US); Republic of Music (UK/EU)
- Genre: Indie
- Country of origin: Canada
- Location: Toronto, Ontario, Canada
- Official website: paperbagrecords.com

Paper Bag Records is a Canadian independent record label, artist management company, and music publishing company founded in 2002 and based in Toronto.

== History ==
The label was created to focus on the Toronto-area indie rock music scene. Initial signings were Broken Social Scene and Stars with their breakthrough albums, You Forgot It in People and Heart. The label helped launch the careers of controller. controller, Tokyo Police Club, and Austra, amongst many others.

For two years, Paper Bag Records was given the title of 'Best Label' from Toronto's Now Magazine in Now's 2008 and 2009 issues. In the August 2007 issue of U.S. publication XLR8R, Paper Bag Records was voted #14 for "Best Indie Label".

Paper Bag Records launched their "Paper Bag Digital" online store in June 2008, which features their entire catalog for purchase and download in mp3 and FLAC formats.

In 2009, Trevor Larocque made significant changes to the label's identity and image. In 2011, The Toronto Star is quoted with a mention that the label is "having one of the best years of its existence" and in early 2012, Toronto's weekly paper The Grid recognized the label as a "cornerstone of Canadian music." In September 2012, CBC Radio said the Paper Bag Records "could be the most influential label in Canada". New bands joined the label including Elliott Brood, The Rural Alberta Advantage, Born Ruffians, Young Galaxy, Cuff the Duke, and PS I Love You. In 2012, the label announced that Montreal artists Tim Hecker, Moonface (Spencer Krug), Yamantaka // Sonic Titan, and The Luyas were joining its roster. Larocque would sell and leave the label in 2023 after 22 years of being involved.

The Paper Bag Records series of vinyl releases were produced in very limited quantities, each being between 300–500 copies. They were released on colored 180-gram vinyl with silk-screened artwork.

Paper Bag Records played host to the first Independent Label Market event in Canada during the NXNE 2013.

== Awards and nominations ==
Juno Award

Year	Nominee / work	Award	Result
2003	Broken Social Scene You Forgot It in People	Alternative Album of the Year	Won
2004	Stars Heart	Alternative Album of the Year	Nominated
2008	Tokyo Police Club Cheer It On	Video of the Year	Nominated
2012	Austra Feel It Break	Electronic Album of the Year	Nominated
2012	Cuff The Duke Morning Comes	Adult Alternative Album of the Year	Nominated
2012	The Rural Alberta Advantage Stamp	Video of the Year	Nominated
2012	The Rural Alberta Advantage	New Group of the Year	Nominated
2013	Elliott BROOD Days Into Years	Roots & Traditional Album of the Year	Won
2014	Born Ruffians	Breakthrough Group of the Year	Nominated
2014	Yamantaka//Sonic Titan UZU	Alternative Album of the Year	Nominated
2015	Elliott BROOD Work And Love	Roots & Traditional Album of the Year	Nominated
2017	Sarah Neufeld The Ridge	Instrumental Album of the Year	Nominated

Polaris Music Prize

Year	Nominee / work	Award	Result
2006	The Deadly Snakes Porcella	Polaris Music Prize	Nominated
2011	Austra Feel It Break	Polaris Music Prize	Nominated
2012	Yamantaka // Sonic Titan Yamantaka // Sonic Titan	Polaris Music Prize	Nominated
2013	Young Galaxy Ultramarine	Polaris Music Prize	Nominated
2014	Yamantaka // Sonic Titan UZU	Polaris Music Prize	Nominated

MuchMusic Video Award

Year	Nominee / work	Award	Result
2007	Tokyo Police Club Cheer It On	Best Independent Video	Won
2011	You Say Party Lonely's Lunch	Best Independent Video	Nominated
2011	You Say Party Lonely's Lunch	Director of the Year - Sean Wainsteim	Won

Plug Awards

Year	Nominee / work	Award	Result
2007	Tokyo Police Club Nature of the Experiment	Song of the Year	Nominated
2007	Tokyo Police Club	New Artist of the Year	Nominated
2008	Sally Shapiro Disco Romance	Dance/Electronic Album of the Year	Nominated
2008	Sally Shapiro	Female Artist of the Year	Nominated

Western Canadian Music Awards

Year	Nominee / work	Award	Result
2010	You Say Party XXXX	Rock Recording Of The Year	Won

== Discography ==
ARTIST	TITLE	FORMAT	CATALOGUE	YEAR
Broken Social Scene	You Forgot It in People	CD	PAPER001	2002
Stars	Dead Child Stars	CD	PAPER002	2002
Stars	Heart	CD	PAPER003	2003
Matthew Barber	Means and Ends	CD	PAPER004	2003
Hawaii	Hawaii	CD	PAPER005	2003
The FemBots	Small Town Murder Scene	CD	PAPER006	2003
Plastikman	Closer	CD	PAPER007	2003
Various Artists	Paper Bag Records Sampler 2004/06/07/08/09	CD / Digital	PAPER008-2/3/4/5	200-
controller.controller	History	CD / LP	PAPER009	2004
Uncut	Those Who Were Hung Hang Here	CD	PAPER010	2004
The FemBots	Mucho Cuidado	CD	PAPER011	2004
Jake Fairley	Touch Not The Cat	CD	PAPER012	2004
Memphis	I Dreamed We Fell Apart	CD	PAPER013	2004
Magneta Lane	The Constant Lover	CD	PAPER014	2005
controller.controller	x-amounts	CD / LP	PAPER015	2005
The FemBots	The City	CD	PAPER016	2005
The Deadly Snakes	Porcella	CD	PAPER017	2005
Various Artists	See You on the Moon!	CD	PAPER018	2005
Magneta Lane	Dancing with Daggers	CD	PAPER019	2006
Tokyo Police Club	A Lesson in Crime	CD / LP	PAPER020 / PAPER020LP	2006
Tokyo Police Club	The Soho Sessions (iTunes Exclusive)	Digital	PBRD1008	2006
Cities in Dust	Night Creatures	CD	PAPER021	2006
Andre Ethier	Secondathallam	CD	PAPER022	2006
Andre Ethier	Live at The Verge	CD	PBRD1009	2006
Uncut	Modern Currencies	CD	PAPER023	2006
Under Byen	Samme stof som stof	CD	PAPER024	2006
You Say Party! We Say Die!	Lose All Time	CD / LP (600 copies)	PAPER025 / PAPER025LP	2006
You Say Party! We Say Die!	Remik's Cube	CD	PBRD1022	2008
The Acorn	Tin Fist	CD	PAPER026	2006
The Acorn	Glory Hope Mountain	CD / 2xLP (300 copies)	PAPER027 / PAPER027LP	2007
The Acorn	Heron Act	CD	PBRD1020	2008
Figurines	When the Deer Wore Blue	CD	PAPER028	2007
Sally Shapiro	Disco Romance	CD	PAPER029	2007
Tokyo Police Club	Smith EP	CD	PAPER030	2007
Laura Barrett	Earth Sciences EP	CD	PAPER031	2007
Under Byen	Siamesisk	CD	PAPER032	2007
Slim Twig	Derelict Dialect EP	CD / LP (300 copies)	PAPER033 / PAPER038LP	2008
Sally Shapiro	Remix Romance Vol. 1	CD	PAPER034	2008
Sally Shapiro	Remix Romance Vol. 2	Digital	PAPER035	2008
Woodhands	Heart Attack	CD / 2xLP (300 copies)	PAPER036 / PAPER036LP	2008
Woodhands	I Wasn't Made For Fighting EP	Digital	PBRD1021	2008
Woodhands	Live Session (iTunes Exclusive)- EP	Digital	PBRD1026	2009
Woodhands	Dancer EP	Digital	PBRD1028	2009
Montag	Hibernation	Digital	PBRD1027	2009
Winter Gloves	Let Me Drive EP	Digital	PBRD1024	2008
Winter Gloves	About a Girl	CD / LP (300 copies)	PAPER037 / PAPER37LP	2008
Winter Gloves	A Way to Celebrate	CD (1000 copies)	PBRD1040	2009
Slim Twig	Vernacular Violence	CD / LP (300 copies)	PAPER038 / PAPER038LP	2008
Laura Barrett	Victory Garden	CD	PAPER039	2008
Two Fingers	Two Fingers	CD	PAPER040	2009
Two Fingers	What You Know (single)	Digital	PBRD1029	2009
Two Fingers	That Girl (single)	Digital	PBRD1030	2009
Two Fingers	Bad Girl (single)	Digital	PBRD1038	2009
Josh Reichmann Oracle Band	Life is Legal EP	CD / LP (300 copies)	PBRD1025 / PBRD1025LP	2009
Josh Reichmann Oracle Band	Crazy Power	CD / LP (300 copies)	PAPER041 / PAPER041LP	2009
Josh Reichmann Oracle Band	Shivering Black EP	Digital	PBRD1031	2009
Monogrenade	La Saveur des Fruits EP	Digital	PBRD1034	2009
Slim Twig	Contempt!	CD / LP (300 copies)	PAPER042 / PAPER042LP	2009
Sally Shapiro	Miracle (single)	Digital	PBRD1032	2009
Sally Shapiro	Love in July (single)	Digital	PBRD1035	2009
Sally Shapiro	My Guilty Pleasure	CD / LP (300 copies)	PAPER043 / PAPER043LP	2009
Rock Plaza Central	...at the moment of our most needing	CD / LP (300 copies)	PAPER044 / PAPER044LP	2009
Rock Plaza Central	Are We Not Horses	LP (300 copies)	PAPER044LP2	2009
You Say Party! We Say Die!	XXXX	CD / LP (300 copies)	PAPER045 / PAPER045LP	2009
Woodhands	Remorsecapade	CD / LP (300 copies)	PAPER046 / PAPER046LP	2010
Little Girls	Tambourine EP	Digital	PBRD1033	2009
Little Girls	Concepts	CD / LP (300 copies)	PAPER047 / PAPER047LP	2009
Two Fingers	Instrumentals	CD	PAPER048	2009
CFCF	Panesian Nights	Digital	PBRD1023	2009
CFCF	The Explorers EP (feat. Sally Shapiro)	Digital	PBRD1037	2009
CFCF	Continent	CD / 2xLP (500 copies)	PAPER049 / PAPER049LP	2009
Under Byen	Alt er tabt	CD	PAPER050	2010
Young Galaxy	Invisible Republic	CD/LP	PAPER051	2010
Born Ruffians	Say It	CD/LP	PAPER052	2010
The Acorn	No Ghosts	CD/LP	PAPER053	2010
The Rural Alberta Advantage	Hometowns	CD/LP	PAPER054	2010
PS I Love You	Meet Me At The Muster Station	CD/LP	PAPER055	2010
Winter Gloves	All Red	CD/LP	PAPER056	2010
Johan Agebjörn	Casablanca Nights	CD	PAPER057	2010
Austra	Feel It Break	CD/LP	PAPER058	2010
Young Galaxy	Shapeshifting	CD/LP	PAPER059	2011
The Rural Alberta Advantage	Departing	CD/LP	PAPER060	2011
Elliott Brood	Days Into Years	CD/LP	PAPER061	2011
Cuff The Duke	Morning Comes	CD/LP	PAPER062	2011
CFCF	Exercises	CD/LP	PAPER063	2012
PS I Love You	Death Dreams	CD/LP	PAPER064	2012
Slim Twig	Sof' Sike	CD/LP	PAPER065	2012
The Luyas	Animator	CD/LP	PAPER066	2012
Cuff The Duke	Union	CD/LP	PAPER067	2012
Yamantaka // Sonic Titan	YT//ST	CD/LP	PAPER068	2012
Cuff The Duke	Life Stories for Minimum Wage	LP	PAPER069	2012
Sally Shapiro	Somewhere Else	CD/LP	PAPER070	2013
Luke Lalonde	Rhythymnals	CD/LP	PAPER071	2012
Born Ruffians	Birthmarks	CD/LP	PAPER072	2013
Young Galaxy	Ultramarine	CD/LP	PAPER073	2013
Rachel Zeffira	The Deserters	CD/LP	PAPER074	2013
CFCF	Music for Objects	CD/LP	PAPER075	2013
CFCF	Outside	CD/LP	PAPER076	2013
DIANA	Perpetual Surrender	CD/LP	PAPER077	2013
Austra	Olympia	CD/LP	PAPER078	2013
Tim Hecker	Virgins	CD/LP	PAPER079	2013
Moonface	Julia With Blue Jeans On	CD/LP	PAPER080	2013
Yamantaka // Sonic Titan	UZU	CD/LP	PAPER081	2013
Sam Roberts Band	Lo-Fantasy	CD/LP	PAPER082	2014
Frog Eyes	Carey's Cold Spring	CD/LP	PAPER083	2014
Mozart's Sister	Being	CD/LP	PAPER084	2014
PS I Love You	For Those Who Stay	CD/LP	PAPER085	2014
Grey Lands	Songs By Other People	CD/LP	PAPER086	2014
Elliott Brood	Work And Love	CD/LP	PAPER087	2014
The Rural Alberta Advantage	Mended with Gold	CD/LP	PAPER088	2014
My Brightest Diamond	This Is My Hand	CD/LP	PAPER089	2014
Johan Agebjörn	Notes	CD/LP	PAPER090	2015
Teen Daze	Morning World	CD/LP	PAPER091	2015
Hey Mother Death	Highway	CD/LP	PAPER092	2015
The Acorn	Vieux Loup	CD/LP	PAPER093	2015
Young Rival	Interior Light	CD/LP	PAPER094	2015
Princess Century	Progress	CD/LP	PAPER095	2015
Alana Yorke	Dream Magic	CD/LP	PAPER096	2015
Grey Lands	Right Arm	CD/LP	PAPER097	2015
Frog Eyes	Pickpocket's Locket	CD/LP	PAPER098	2015
Born Ruffians	RUFF	CD/LP	PAPER099	2015
Young Galaxy	Falsework	CD/LP	PAPER101	2015
You Say Party	You Say Party	CD/LP	PAPER102	2016
Sarah Neufeld	The Ridge	CD/LP	PAPER103	2016
Tim Hecker	Love Streams	CD/LP	PAPER104	2016
The Luyas	Human Voicing	CD/LP	PAPER105	2017
Sam Roberts Band	TerraForm	CD/LP	PAPER106	2016
Lou Canon	Suspicious	CD/LP	PAPER107	2017
Mappe Of	A Northern Star, A Perfect Stone	CD/LP	PAPER108	2017
Yamantaka // Sonic Titan	Dirt	CD/LP	PAPER109	2017
The Dears	Times Infinity, Vol. 2	CD/LP	PAPER110	2017
Aron D'Alesio	Aron D'Alesio	CD/LP	PAPER111	2017
Jonathan Kawchuk	North	CD/LP	PAPER112	2017
The Rural Alberta Advantage	The Wild	CD/LP	PAPER113	2017
Elliott Brood	Ghost Gardens	CD/LP	PAPER114	2017
Born Ruffians	Uncle, Duke and the Chief	CD/LP	PAPER115	2018
Postdata	Let's Be Wilderness	CD/LP	PAPER117	2018
Frog Eyes	Violet Psalms	CD/LP	PAPER118	2018
Chad Valley	Imaginary Music	CD/LP	PAPER121	2018
Art d'Ecco	Trespasser	CD/LP	PAPER122	2018
Royal Canoe	Waver	CD/LP	PAPER123	2019
Luke Lalonde	The Perpetual Optimist	CD/LP		2019
Mappe Of	The Isle of Ailynn	CD/LP		2019
Lou Canon	Audomatic Body	CD/LP		2020
Postdata	Twin Flames	CD/LP		2020
Zoon	Bleached Waves	CD/LP		2020
Art d'Ecco	In Standard Definition - Vol. 2	CD/LP	PAPER133	2021
Sarah Neufeld	Detritus	CD/LP		2021
Royal Canoe	Sidelining	CD/LP		2021
Mappe Of	Afterglades	CD/LP		2025

== See also ==
- List of record labels
