= Rude 66 =

Dutch musician

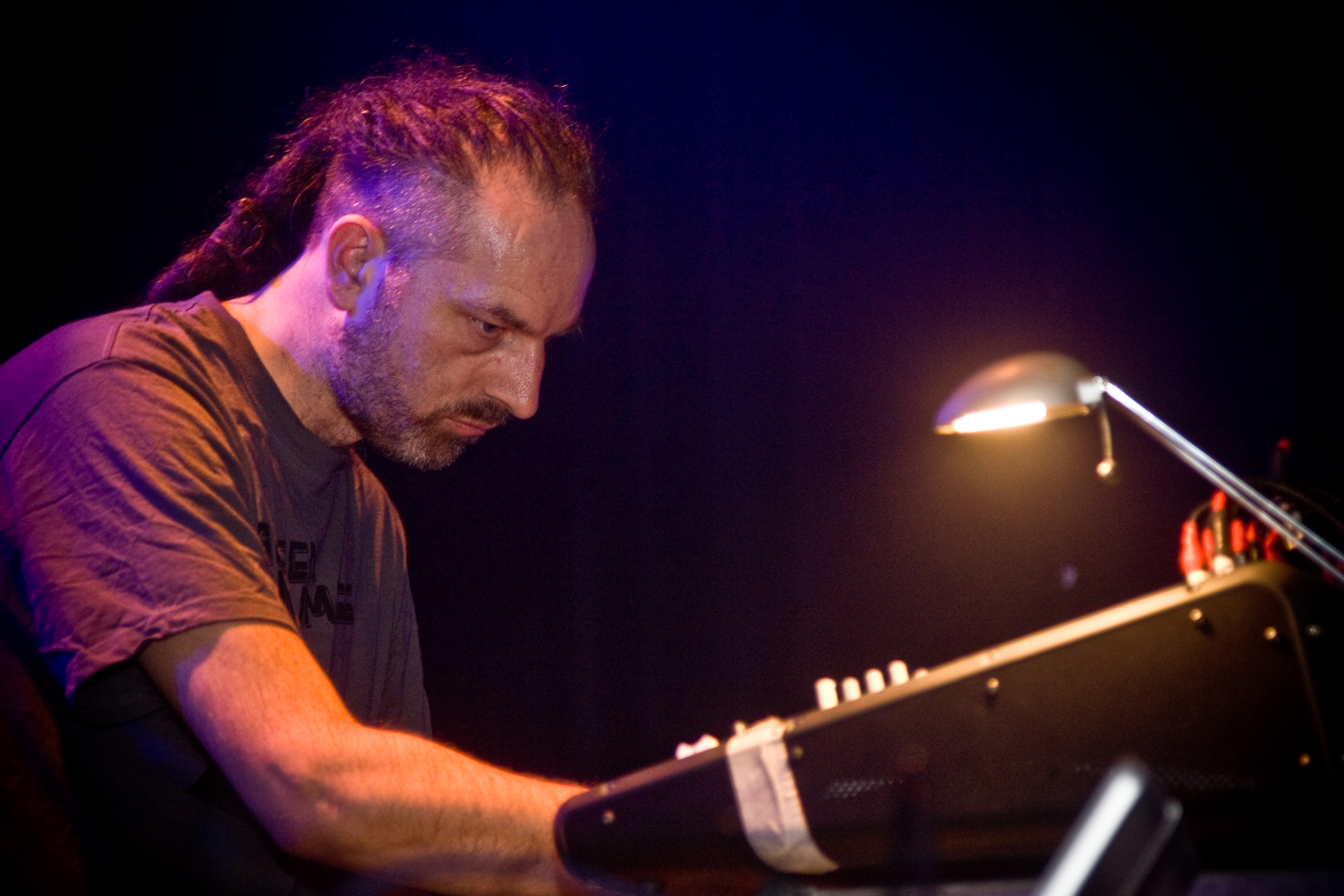
Rude 66 live on stage

Rude 66 (real name Ruud Lekx; born in Delft in 1966) is a Dutch electronic musician and recording artist currently living in Amsterdam. Live and occasionally on records, his wife Shaunna Lekx is also part of the band as a vocalist and co-writer of lyrics. Rude 66 has been a longtime collaborator of the Bunker Records label, and has released influential records in both acid house and electro music styles of electronic music.

== Name ==
The name Rude 66 is a reference to both the English pronunciation of Lekx's first name and year of birth. It is also a play on the famous American highway Route 66.

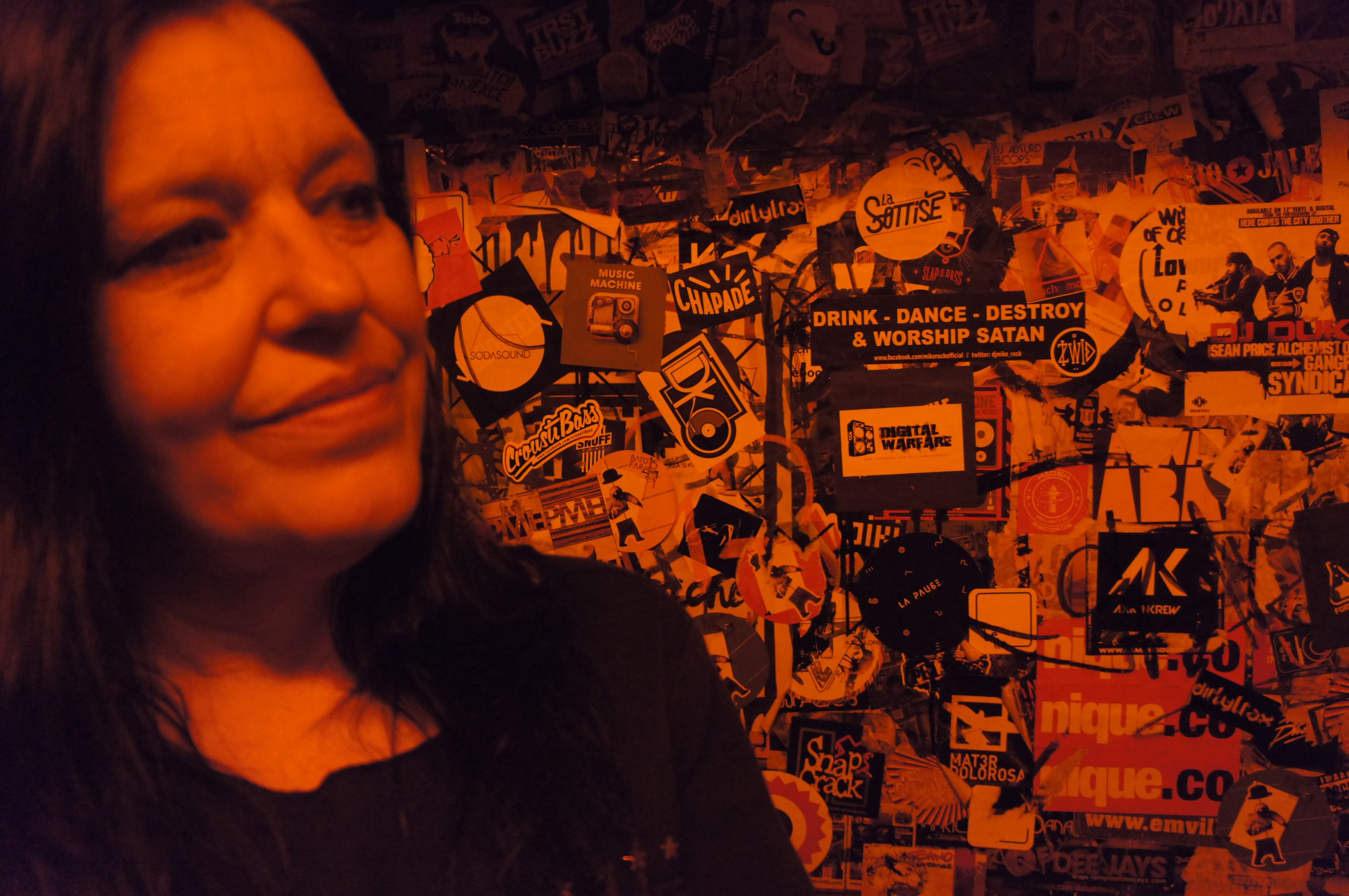
Shaunna Lekx, singer of Rude 66, in the backstage of Batofar Club, Paris 2014

== History ==
Rude 66 started as a musician in the '80s, playing keyboards in Noise band Kamika6 who gained some notoriety in the Dutch underground scene but only produced a demo cassette. In school, he met Eric van Spelde with whom he formed Voice of the Mute, an Electronic body music band who released a track on a compilation on Body Records in 1990. They then formed the duo Modulate, who released a techno EP in 1993 on Belgian label SSR, an offshoot of Crammed Discs.

== First Bunker releases ==
Meeting up again with high school friend Guy Tevares who just started Bunker Records, Rude gave Tevares a tape of acid tracks that was released on Bunker in 1993. Like many of Rude's earlier tracks, this was produced by Arno Peeters. The double LP received favorable reviews and tracks were played on National radio. It was followed by a string of albums that established Rude 66 as one of the main names of the label and of the lo-fi acid scene. These albums all have the typical Bunker Records look: there is no sleeve and there are no track titles: the only info is the artist name and the catalogue number on the black label. Rude started his own label Speedster Records in 1995, but due to distribution problems, only one EP was released in a limited edition of 300 copies. Most were sold through the Hotmix Mailorder of I-f.

== 1996–2011 ==
Rude moved to Djax-Up-Beats in 1996 and released 2 EPs there before Bunker restarted and Rude was among the first artists to release electro EPs like the classic Machine EP. From 2005 to 2011 Rude 66 released his main output on the Creme Organisation label, including Black Sabbath (2005), the 1000 Year Storm (2007), As (2008) and the Sadistic Tendencies album. A big difference between the earlier Bunker releases and Rude's post-1998 output is the addition of his wife Shaunna on vocals, mostly sung through a vocoder which gives the voice a robotic quality. She also plays the live shows and contributes to the lyrics, which usually have a dark content matter (serial killers, psychopaths, war themes, etc.) which is sometimes in contrast with the music which can sometimes have a pop quality.

From 1996 to 2005 Rude 66 was connected to the CEM studio in Amsterdam, an experimental electronic music studio dating back to the 1960s. He started the Vynalogica label in 2000, where invited modern dance music artists could work with the studio's vintage modular synthesizers and the results were released as vinyl ep's. Records were released by endorphins, Legowelt, Orgue Electronique, Dntel, Bong-Ra, Solvent, Lowfish, and others. The studio lost its government funding in 2005, resulting in the end of the label.

From 2007 until now, Rude has been involved in the running of Intergalactic FM, I-f's online radio station. He presents a weekly live show called Cosmic Overdrive that's the longest running show on the station.

== 2012–2015: New label and mastering ==
After a breakup with the Creme Organisation label over owed funds and royalties, Rude 66 moved to the Bordello A Parigi label from his original hometown of Delft. This label released his Paranoia/ The Kill EP in 2014 and also acted as distributor for the album Secret Treaties. This album only exists in reel-to-reel form, and 36 copies were made. Sleeve and tape copying were done at home, and the whole album is much more experimental in the dark ambient genre. The end of 2016 will see the release of two new albums: the Rude 66 album From Reason to Ritual on Bordello A Parigi and Make It Quiet, an album Ruud and Shaunna Lekx recorded with guitarist Weytkin under the band name LEKX. The music on this album is not electronic, but shoegaze, dreampop and noise music orientated with the members playing only guitars and basses, not synthesizers, and experimenting with different tunings.

Since 2009, Rude 66 is also active as mastering engineer, specializing in masters for vinyl releases and remastering of older material, sometimes from cassette-only releases from the 1970s and 1980s. Various releases credit the mastering to either "Rude 66" and "Ruud Lekx".

As a live artist, Rude 66 has played all over the world in the last 25 years, including the US and most European countries. For the last 15 years, his wife Shaunna has accompanied him on vocal duties.

== Discography ==
=== Albums ===
Bunker 012 (Bunker, 1994)
Bunker 013 (Bunker, 1994)
Bunker 019 (Bunker, 1994 cd compilation of 012 and 013)
Bunker 020 (Bunker 1995)
The Devils Highway (Silver Recordings, 1996)
Bunker 027 (Bunker, 1997)
Bunker 028 (Bunker, 1997)
Sadistic Tendencies (Crème Organisation, 2008)
Two Worlds 1992–1998 (Creme Organisation, 2011)
Secret Treaties (Speedster Records, 2015)

=== EPs and singles ===
Modulate- Dreams EP (Crammed/SSR, 1993)
Acid Planet 3 7-inch (Acid Planet, 1994)
Lucifer (Djax-Up-Beats,1996)
66 deadly sins (Kultbox, 1997)
B-day (Djax-Up-Beats, 1998)
De machine des duivels (Bunker, 2000)
De Wraak der wegpiraten (Bunker 2002)
Black Sabbath (Creme Organisation, 2005)
Overkill (Viewlexx, 2005)
Strings of Death (Vynalogica, 2006)
1000 Year storm (Crème Organisation, 2007)
As (Crème Organisation, 2008)
Tomorrow is too Far/I am God (split 7-inch with Screen Vinyl Image, Custom Made Music, 2011)
Under Cover of the Night (Gooiland Electro, 2014)
The Kill (Bordello A Parigi, 2014)

=== Exclusive tracks on compilations ===
Voice of the Mute- Mission Impossible (on Somewhere in the Skeleton, Body Records, 1990)
The Covenant (on Bunker 3000, Bunker, 1999)
Donker (on Eurelectro.nix ep, Angelmaker, 2003)
Killers (on Tribute to Iron Maiden, Angelmaker cd/ep, 2004)
Die Stärke der Vernichtende Schläge(on Stalingrad vol.1, Bunker, 2005)
Undercover (on Tribute to Bob Moog, Crème Organisation cd/ep, 2006)
Angst Bleibt (on Nagasaki Nightriders, Crème Organisation, 2007)
Donker (on Le Mix, International DJ Gigolo, 2008)

=== Remixes ===
Riplets- Hey Mickey (Rude 66 remix), G&J Records, 2004
Bastards of Love- Rituals (Rude 66 remix), Werocklikecrazy, 2005
Maarten van der Vleuten- Eltec (Rude 66 remix), Mighty Robot Recordings, 2006
Sally Shapiro- By your side (Rude 66 808 and 909remix), Discocaine, 2006
Psyche- Unveiling the Secret (Rude 66 remix), Electronic Corporation, 2006
Ra-X- Dresden 1943, 2nd front (Rude 66 remix), Angelmaker, 2007
Johan Agebjörn- Spacer woman (Rude 66 remix), LOEB, 2008
