= History (EP) =

EP by controller.controller
- Released: August 3, 2004
- Genre: Indie rock, dance-punk
- Length: 24:37
- Label: Paper Bag Records
- Producer: Rob Sanzo and controller.controller

Controller.controller chronology
History (2004)	x-amounts (2005)

Professional ratings
Review scores
Source	Rating
AllMusic	4/5 stars
PopMatters	(Favorable)
Pitchfork Media	(8.3/10)
Exclaim!	(favourable)
Spin	(favourable)

History is the debut EP by Canadian indie rock band controller.controller. It was released on August 3, 2004 on Paper Bag Records.

== Track listing ==
All songs by controller.controller (Basnayake/Kaija/Llewellyn-Thomas/Morris/Scheven).

1. "..." – 0:40
2. "History" – 4:26
3. "Silent Seven" – 4:17
4. "Sleep Over It" – 3:45
5. "Bruised Broken Beaten" – 2:06
6. "Disco Blackout" – 5:22
7. "Watch" – 4:01
