= About a Girl (album) =

Studio album by Winter Gloves
- Released: 24 March 2009
- Recorded: January 2008
- Genre: Indie pop, synthpop
- Length: 29:22
- Label: Paper Bag Records
- Producer: Winter Gloves, Jon Drew

Winter Gloves chronology
Let Me Drive (2008)	About a Girl (2009)	A Way to Celebrate (2009)

Professional ratings
Review scores
Source	Rating
Exclaim!	(no rating)
The Gateway	positive

About a Girl is an LP album by Canadian indie pop band Winter Gloves. It was released on 24 March 2009 by Paper Bag Records.

The album was primarily recorded in lo-fi by Charles F., using only one microphone and a combination of amped and unplugged instruments. Errant noises were intentionally mixed into songs to achieve "a pleasant dirty sound". Most of the songs fit in the second wave synthpop genre popularized in the early 2000s, although reviews correlate the song structures and instrumentation to the later revival of dance-punk and electronic dance music in general.

== Track listing ==
All tracks are written by Charles F.

No.	Title	Length
1.	"Factories"	2:39
2.	"Let Me Drive"	2:28
3.	"Invisible"	3:00
4.	"I Can't Tell You"	3:29
5.	"Glass Paperweight"	2:39
6.	"Hillside"	3:00
7.	"About a Girl"	2:55
8.	"Party People"	3:37
9.	"The Way to Celebrate"	1:57
10.	"Piano 4 Hands"	3:38
Total length:		29:22

== Personnel ==
- Charles F. – vocals, Wurlitzer, pipe organ
- Vincent Chalifour – synth bass, keyboards
- Pat Sayers – drums
- Louis Fernandez – guitar
- Jon Drew – producer, mixing engineer
- Peter van Llyfanck – mastering engineer
- James Mejia – album artist
