= Cities in Dust (band) =

Canadian hardcore and indie rock band

- Origin: Hamilton, Ontario, Canada
- Genres: Indie rock
- Years active: 2003–present
- Label: Paper Bag Records
- Members: Zach Frank; Craig Nordemann; Simon Toye; Matt Winters

Cities in Dust is a Canadian hardcore and indie rock band from Hamilton, Ontario. Its members consist of Zach Frank (vocals), Craig Nordemann (bass), Simon Toye (guitar) and Matt Winters (drummer).

== History ==
The band took its name from the Siouxsie and the Banshees song "Cities in Dust" and formed in 2003. The band members worked on creating arrangements and developed their lively stage performance; many of the songs were written by Frank. In late 2005, they began recording their material in Toronto with the help of John Drew, and in early 2006 they participated in Canadian Music Week in Toronto.

Independent record label Paper Bag Records signed Cities in Dust in April 2006, in part due to the onstage antics of Frank. Soon after, their debut album Night Creatures was released.

Cities in Dust appeared at the World Electronic Music Festival in June 2006. The band was nominated for three awards at the 2006 Hamilton Music Awards: "Record of the Year", "New Artist/Group of the Year", and "Alternative Recording of the Year". Night Creatures was named by Exclaim! magazine as one of the Top 10 Punk albums of 2006 in Canada. It received heavy rotation on CBC Radio 3.

In 2007, Cities in Dust appeared on the soundtracks of three 2K Sports video games: College Hoops 2K7, Major League Baseball 2K7 and NHL 2K8. Additionally, their song "Chop Chop You're Dead" was included in the 2007 film Superbad.

== Discography ==
- Night Creatures (2006)

== See also ==
- Music of Canada
- Canadian rock
- List of bands from Canada
- List of Canadian musicians
- Category:Canadian musical groups
