= Samme stof som stof =

Studio album by Under byen
- Released: 2006
- Genre: Alternative/indie
- Length: 53:23
- Label: Morningside Records, Paper Bag Records, A:Larm music

Under byen chronology
Samme stof som stof	Alt er tabt

Professional ratings
Review scores
Source	Rating
Allmusic	4/5 stars

Samme stof som stof is an album by Under byen, released in 2006. The title means "same fabric as fabric", or "same matter as matter", although the word "stof" has multiple meanings in Danish, suggesting a wordplay. "Stof" can mean either fabric or physical matter giving the title multiple meanings (such as "same matter as fabric").

== Track listing ==
1. "Pilot" – 5:10
2. "Den her sang handler om at få det bedste ud af det" – 7:32
3. "Tindrer" – 3:27
4. "Heftig" – 5:18
5. "Panterplanker" – 0:46
6. "Af samme stof som stof" – 4:26
7. "Film og omvendt" – 11:28
8. "Mere af det samme og meget mere af det hele" – 1:39
9. "Siamesisk" – 5:45
10. "Liste over sande venner og forbilleder" – 2:08
11. "Palads" – 4:10
12. "Slå sorte hjerte" – 3:13
