= Modern Currencies =

Studio album by Uncut
- Released: October 24, 2006
- Genre: Indie rock
- Length: 48:49
- Labels: Paper Bag Records (North America)

Uncut chronology
Those Who Were Hung Hang Here (2004)	Modern Currencies (2006)

Professional ratings
Review scores
Source	Rating
Allmusic	4/5 stars
Pitchfork	(7.7/10)
PopMatters	(8/10)

Modern Currencies is an album by Canadian indie rock group Uncut, released by Paper Bag Records on October 24, 2006.

== Track listing ==
No.	Title	Length
1.	"Dark Horse"	5:04
2.	"Hideaway"	3:26
3.	"New Cities"	4:26
4.	"Out of Sight"	5:37
5.	"Breaking Glass"	4:06
6.	"Never Say Never"	4:21
7.	"Kiss Me"	3:37
8.	"These Times"	3:28
9.	"Minus One"	3:43
10.	"Chain Fight"	3:48
11.	"The Night Can See"	3:36
12.	"Prison Waltz"	3:37
