= Remix Romance Vol. 1 =

Remix album by Sally Shapiro
- Released: April 15, 2008
- Recorded: 2007–2008
- Genre: Italo disco
- Length: 61:38
- Label: Paper Bag Records
- Producer: Johan Agebjörn

Sally Shapiro chronology
Disco Romance (2006)	Remix Romance Vol. 1 (2008)	Remix Romance Vol. 2 (2008)

Professional ratings
Review scores
Source	Rating
Allmusic	3.5/5 stars
Pitchfork Media	(7.6/10)

Remix Romance Vol. 1 is a remix compilation album by Sally Shapiro. It collects previously existing and newly minted versions of tracks from Disco Romance, including those produced by Holy Fuck, Jon Brooks, Junior Boys, The Juan MacLean, Lindstrøm, Skatebård, and Tensnake.

Some tracks feature the addition of live instruments, most notably on The Cansecos' version of "Hold Me So Tight".

== Track listing ==
All tracks written by Johan Agebjörn except where stated.

1. "I'll Be By Your Side (Tensnake Remix)" — 7:37
2. "I Know You're My Love (The Juan MacLean Remix)" (Agebjörn/MacLean) — 8:00
3. "Find My Soul (Holy Fuck Remix)" — 4:22
4. "Anorak Christmas (Woodhands Remix)" (Roger Gunnarsson) — 5:20
5. "He Keeps Me Alive (Skatebård Remix)" (Gunnarsson) — 3:57
6. "Hold Me So Tight (The Cansecos Remix)" — 6:26
7. "Skating in the Moonshine (Jon Brooks Remix)" — 4:25
8. "Jackie Junior (Junior Boys Remix)" (Gunnarsson/Agebjörn/Didemus/Greenspan) — 5:05
9. "Time To Let Go (Lindstrøm Remix)" — 10:58
10. "Sleep in My Arms (Between Interval Remix)" (Agebjörn/Erik van den Broek) — 5:28

== Personnel and Credits ==
=== Personnel ===
- Sally Shapiro — Vocals
- Johan Agebjörn — Original production, backing vocals
- Evelina Joëlson — Backing vocals on original versions of "Anorak Christmas", "Jackie Junior", and "Skating in the Moonshine"
- Anna Sanne Göransson — Backing vocals on original versions of "Jackie Junior" and "Skating in the Moonshine"

=== Credits ===
Compilation selection by Sally Shapiro and Johan Agebjörn.
