= Little Girls (band) =

- Origin: Toronto, Ontario, Canada
- Genres: Indie rock, post-punk
- Years active: 2008–present
- Labels: Hand Drawn Dracula; Mexican Summer; Captured Tracks; Paper Bag
- Members: Josh McIntyre; Cam Findlay; Andrew Wilson; Tristan Bates
- Website: http://littlegirlsband.com

Little Girls is a Canadian indie rock band formed in 2008 from Toronto, Ontario, Canada. The band emerged from Toronto's post-punk scene as a solo recording project of multi-instrumentalist Josh McIntyre. With a focus on Minimalist Electronic, Little Girls released CULTS EP (September 6, 2011) on Hand Drawn Dracula and are currently working on their second full-length record.

In the wake of a series of high-profile blog mentions and singles released on Brooklyn labels Mexican Summer and Captured Tracks, Little Girls released their debut album Concepts on Paper Bag Records on October 13, 2009. Prior to Concepts. The band also released Tambourine with Paper Bag Digital on June 2, 2009. The songs combine lo-fi distorted surf rock with layers of haunting, and melodic walls of sound. Little Girls quickly embarked on a North American tour, performing with some of the most talked about bands of the year, as well, has performed at several major International Music Festivals including Halifax Pop Explosion, Pop Montreal, CMJ, and South by Southwest Festival. Little Girls album Concepts debuted at No. 12 on Chart Attack, the second highest debut achieved that week, No. 14 on the Earshot Radio Chart and charted at No. 10 on the Earshot National Top 50.

== History ==
It began when Josh McIntyre recorded songs in his home studio as a side project in early 2009. Seeking the unbiased opinions from friends and musical peers, he anonymously posted the music on the internet under the name "Little Girls," a name he believed least likely to reveal his identity. He also sent a link to influential music blog Gorilla vs. Bear, and within days, the music was receiving thousands of plays and Little Girls was getting positive attention from blogs such as The Walrus, No Pain in Pop, Static Fuzz, Exclaim! Pitchfork Media, and Brooklyn Vegan. Little Girls' sound also inspired influential UK magazine Dazed & Confused to feature the band in their May 'Mavericks' issue.

Little Girls' sound is driven by youth and nostalgia, and whose influences also come from the 1980s no-wave post-punk scene and the early 1980s golden era of hip-hop. Equally influential are the late hip-hop artist J. Dilla, as well as Can, Joy Division, Wire, and The Clean. Other releases were subsequently released on PBR and Brooklyn labels Mexican Summer and Captured Tracks.

== Members ==
=== Current ===
Josh McIntyre
Andrew Wilson
Cam Findlay
Tristan Bates

== Discography ==
=== EPs ===
- 2011 - CULTS EP Hand Drawn Dracula
- 2010 - "Delaware/10 Mile Stereo" - 7" single Sixteen Tambourines
- 2010 - "//////// Space Doubt" - 7" split single with Pirate Love Best of Both
- 2009 - "Youth Tunes/Vemon" - 7" single Captured Tracks
- 2009 - Thrills EP - 12" vinyl Mexican Summer
- 2009 - Tambourine - digital EP Paper Bag Records

=== Albums ===
- 2009 - Concepts - CD/LP Paper Bag Records

=== Covers ===
- 2011 - Believer - John Maus
- 2010 - 10 Mile Stereo - Beach House

== See also ==
- Music of Canada
- Canadian rock
- List of Canadian musicians
- List of bands from Canada
- Category:Canadian musical groups
