= Figurines (band) =

Danish rock band

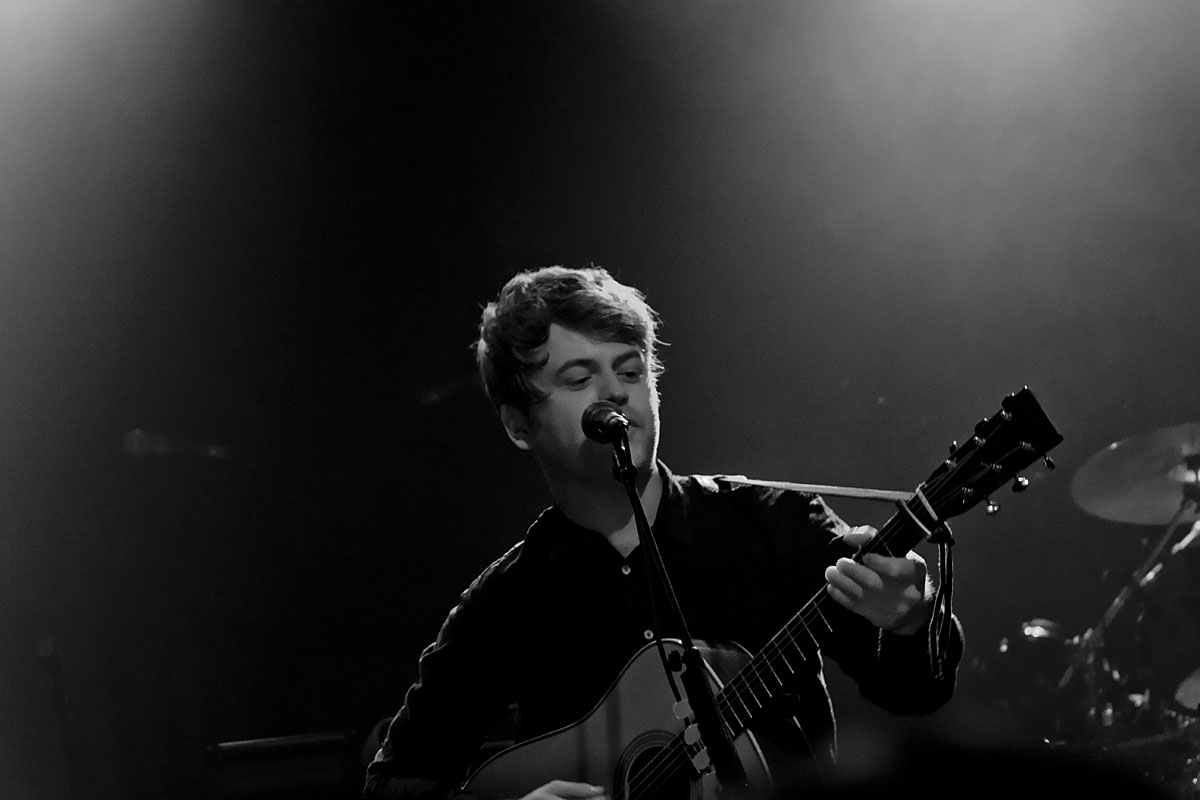

Background information
- Origin: Denmark
- Genres: Indie rock
- Years active: mid-1990s–present
- Labels: Morningside, Paper Bag
- Members: Mads Kjærgaard; Christian Hjelm; Jens Ramon
- Past members: Andreas Toft; Claus Salling Johansen; Kristian Volden; Mathe Fischer

Figurines is an indie rock band from Denmark, formed in the mid-1990s. The band released their first EP, The Detour, in 2001 and their first full-length album, Shake a Mountain, in 2004. The band began to receive national attention in Denmark around the time of the full-length release, and began touring Germany in 2003. Their second full-length, Skeleton, was released in 2005 on Danish label Morningside Records and German label Pop-U-Loud, and on US label The Control Group in 2006.

The band began a North American tour after being nominated for a Canadian Music Week Indie award and has since performed at the Indies ceremony, SXSW, KEXP, and in cities in the US, Canada, and Europe. The band has also received positive press from Pitchfork Media, The New York Times, and Spin, among others. Figurines's sound has been most often compared to that of Pavement, Modest Mouse, and Built to Spill.

The band released their third record When the Deer Wore Blue in 2007 with Chicago-based co-producer/engineer Jeremy Lemos, who has worked with Smog, Jim O'Rourke, Loose Fur, and many other Windy City acts in the past. The new material is more psychedelic than previous efforts, but remains faithful to the melodic-pop sounds of Skeleton and Shake a Mountain on several tracks, including "Hey, Girl", the first single from the record.

In 2010 they released their 4th record titled "Figurines".

== Discography ==
=== Albums ===
- 2004: Shake a Mountain
- 2005: Skeleton
- 2007: When the Deer Wore Blue (DEN #20 in Danish Albums Chart)
- 2010: Figurines

=== EPs ===
- 2001: The Detour (EP)
- 2007: Hey Girl (EP)
- 2010: Lucky to Love (EP)

=== Singles ===
- 2006: "Silver Ponds" (7" single)
- 2007: "Hey Girl"

== Members ==
The band started as a quintet, but later on has functioned as a trio.

Current members

- Christian Hjelm – vocals and guitar
- Claus Salling Johansen – guitar, backing vocals, originally also drums
- Jens Ramon - guitar, synths

Past members

- Andreas Toft - bass
- Kristian Volden – drums, percussion
- Mads Kjærgaard – bass
- Mathe Fischer

The Figurines were formed in the mid-1990s when Christian Hjelm, Claus Salling Johansen and Andreas Toft all began to "jam" together. Originally all the Figurines guitarists. Eventually Toft switched over to bass and Claus swapped to drums until Kristian Volden joined the band.

In May 2006, Andreas left the band and Mads Kjærgaard and Mathe Fischer joined. In 2007 Mathe Fischer left the band after a one-year stay, and Jens Ramon joined.

They went to Sweden in "Silence studios" (an analog studio), where they were living separated from normal life, while they were working on their next release When the Deer Wore Blue produced by Jeremy Lemos (who later worked with Sonic Youth). After touring they began making songs for their new album.

Then Kristian Volden and Mads Kjærgaard left the Figurines, and band turned into a trio. The trio released Figurines in 2010.

== In popular culture ==
The song "The Air We Breathe" was featured on season 1 episode 13 of the TV-show Gossip Girl.
