= Those Who Were Hung Hang Here =

Studio album by Uncut
- Released: July 27, 2004
- Genre: Indie rock
- Length: 37:09
- Label: Paper Bag Records

Uncut chronology
Devotion/Fluent And Pure/Over The Edge (2004)	Those Who Were Hung Hang Here (2004)	Modern Currencies (2006)

Those Who Were Hung Hang Here is the third studio album by Uncut. Released by Paper Bag Records label on July 27, 2004.

Professional ratings
Review scores
Source	Rating
Allmusic	link

== Track listing ==
No.	Title	Length
1.	"Intro"	0:23
2.	"Understanding The New Violence"	5:00
3.	"Buried With Friends"	3:36
4.	"Copilot"	3:41
5.	"Intentions Change"	2:09
6.	"Taken In Sleep"	5:29
7.	"In This Morning Grey"	3:00
8.	"St. Peterburg"	3:42
9.	"Day Breaks Red Light"	3:04
10.	"A Summer Day"	3:13
11.	"When For You"	3:52
Total length:		37:09
