= Magneta Lane =

Canadian indie rock band

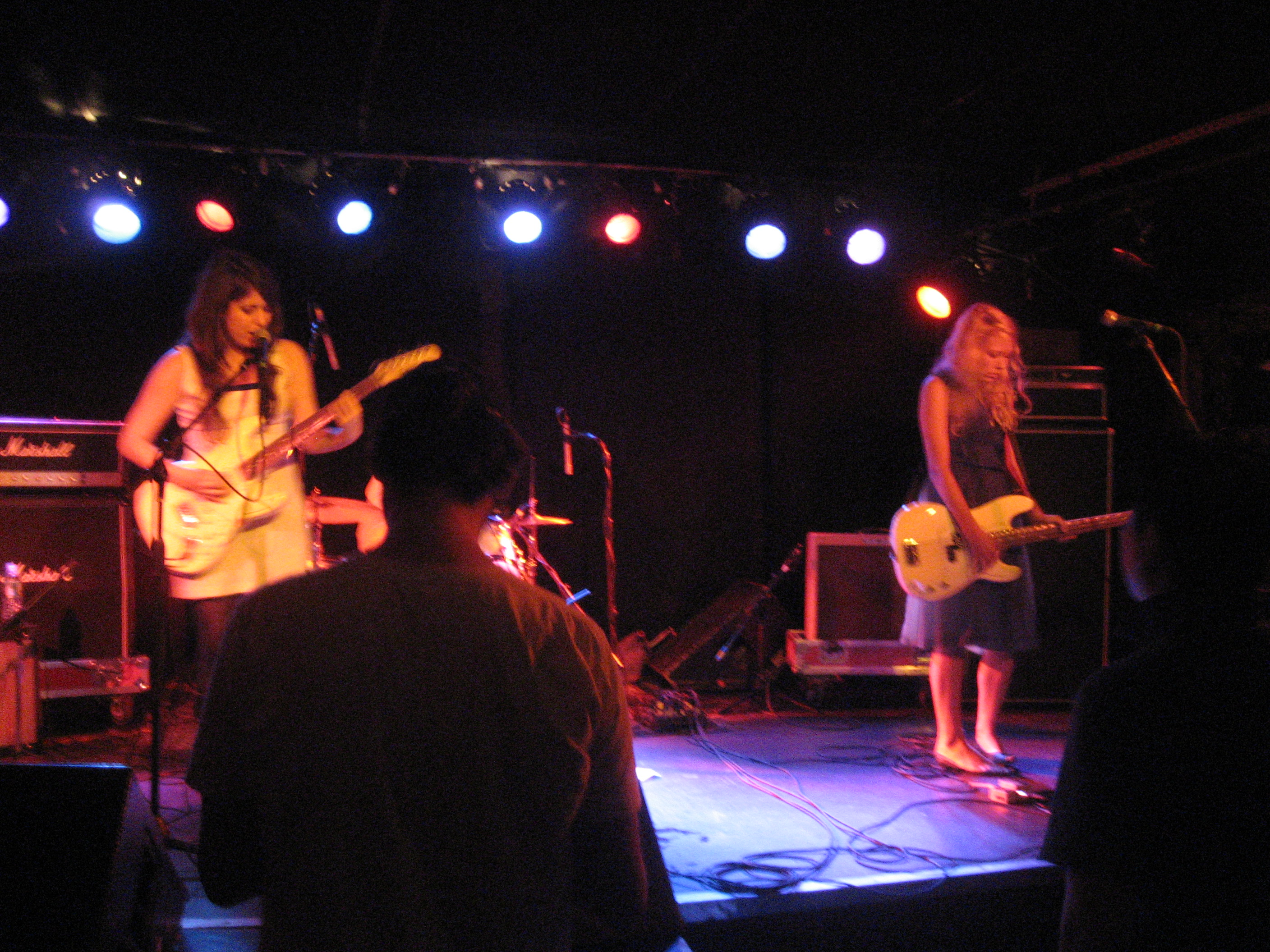
- Magneta Lane @ Mercury Lounge

Background information
- Origin: Toronto, Ontario, Canada
- Genres: Indie rock
- Years active: 2003–2014
- Labels: Paper Bag Records; Last Gang Records; Splendor House Records eOne Music Canada
- Members: Lexi Valentine (guitar/vox); French (bass); Nadia King (drums)

Magneta Lane was a Canadian indie rock band formed in 2003 in Toronto. Magneta Lane disbanded in 2014.

== Biography ==
The all-female line-up consisted of Lexi Valentine (Alexandra Patricia Flores, vocals and guitar), her sister Nadia King (Valerie Flores, drums) and their high school friend French (Francine DiBacco, bass). The group formed after Valentine and King, then aged 16 and 15 years old respectively, attended a concert in Toronto and met the band backstage, deciding that watching a concert was not satisfying enough. The trio came together in the fall of 2003 and spent the next year teaching themselves how to play their instruments and playing shows in and around their native Toronto.

The band released its debut EP, The Constant Lover, in 2004 on Paper Bag Records. The full-length album Dancing with Daggers followed in 2006, and then the band moved to Last Gang Records for 2009's Gambling with God. Following Gambling with God, however, the band ran into label and management changes, and took some time off before reemerging in 2013 with the EP Witchrock. That album was released on the band's own new Splendor House label, with distribution by eOne Music. The band also appeared in k-os' video for "The Dog Is Mine".

Magneta Lane disbanded in 2014. Valentine and King later started a synth/dance pop project called LOLAA, releasing their eponymous EP Lolaa in 2018 and the album La Marea in 2021. Valentine released material as a solo artist as well. In September 2025, Valentine released her song Niña Feliz in the compilation album Antojitos Mexicanos Volumen 20 under the record label Sociedad Subterránea (Socsub). She is credited as singer, songwriter and producer. French joined Cream Productions in 2016, where she later became supervising producer.

== Discography ==
=== EPs ===
- The Constant Lover (EP) (2004, Paper Bag Records)
- Witchrock (2013, eOne Music)

=== Albums ===
- Dancing with Daggers (2006, Paper Bag Records)
- Gambling with God (2009, Last Gang Records)

=== Singles ===
- "The Constant Lover"
- "Ugly Socialite"
- "Cheap Linguistics"
- "Broken Plates"
- "Wild Gardens"
- "Lady Bones"
- "Burn"
- "Lucky"

== Music videos ==
Song	Released	Director	Album	Label	Notes
"The Constant Lover"	2004	Chris Grismer	The Constant Lover	Paper Bag Records	
"Ugly Socialite"	2005	Chris Grismer	The Constant Lover	Paper Bag Records	
"Wild Gardens"	2006	Sean Wainsteim	Dancing with Daggers	Paper Bag Records	
"Broken Plates"	2006	Sean Michael Turrell	Dancing with Daggers	Paper Bag Records	features JFK from Death from Above 1979/ MSTRKRFT
"Lady Bones"	2009	Michael Maxxis	Gambling With God	Last Gang Records	
"Shatter"	2011	French & Kevin Barton	Gambling With God (U.S release)	Last Gang Records	features Scott Kaija of controller.controller and Steve Hamelin of Born Ruffians
"Burn"	2013	Aaron A	Witchrock	eOne Music Canada	
"Lucky"	2013		Witchrock	eOne Music Canada	
