= Winter Gloves =

Canadian indie rock music group

- Origin: Montreal, Quebec, Canada
- Genres: Indie rock
- Years active: 2008–present
- Labels: Paper Bag
- Members: Charles F Pat Sayers; Vincent Chalifour; Nico Ormiston
- Website: winterglovesmusic.com

Winter Gloves is a Canadian indie rock music group from Montreal. The band consists of Charles F. on vocals, Wurlitzer, organ, Vincent Chalifour on synth bass and keyboards, Patrick Sayers on drums and Nico Ormiston on guitars.

== History ==
Winter Gloves formed in 2008 in Montreal after Charles F recorded a number of synthpop songs as a break from the guitar rock he had been performing. He posted these on his Myspace page, and after receiving positive feedback organized a band to perform them.

Their first release, the EP Let Me Drive, was initially distributed solely by throwing copies into the audience at their live shows, but was later released on Paper Bag Records and iTunes, where the title track was featured as a Single of the Week.

The band followed up with their full-length debut album, About a Girl, in 2008.

The albums were supported by tours with Tokyo Police Club, Thunderheist and You Say Party! We Say Die!, as well as performances at the Virgin Festival, the Osheaga Festival and SXSW.

In 2009, the band released an EP, A Way to Celebrate, and then in September 2010, Winter Gloves released their second album entitled All Red, which appeared on the !Earshot National Top 50 Chart in October. They then embarked on a fall tour across Canada and in the US as support for Born Ruffians.

Their song "We Need New Transportation" was featured in an MTS commercial.

In April 2014, band leader Charles F Huot started his solo career under the name Dear Frederic and released his debut EP - Outlast.

== Discography ==
- 2008 Let Me Drive
- 2008 About a Girl
- 2009 A Way to Celebrate
- 2010 All Red
