= Skeleton (Figurines album) =

Studio album by Figurines
- Released: 2005
- Recorded: December 2004
- Genre: Indie rock
- Length: 45:09
- Label: Morningside

Figurines chronology
Skeleton (2005)	When the Deer Wore Blue (2007)

Professional ratings
Review scores
Source	Rating
AllMusic	4/5 stars
Pitchfork Media	8.3/10.0
Rolling Stone	not rated

Skeleton is an album by Figurines, released in 2005.

== Track listing ==
1. "Race You" – 3:02
2. "The Wonder" – 3:06
3. "All Night" – 2:22
4. "Silver Ponds" – 2:48
5. "Ambush" – 3:08
6. "Rivalry" – 5:49
7. "I Remember" – 2:38
8. "Other Plans" – 3:23
9. "Ghost Towns" – 2:56
10. "Continuous Songs" – 2:40
11. "Fiery Affair" – 2:59
12. "Wrong Way All the Way" – 2:16
13. "Back in the Day" – 2:14
14. "Release Me on the Floor" – 5:49
