= Uncut (band) =

Canadian metal band

- Origin: Toronto, Ontario; Canada (2001)
- Genre: Indie rock
- Label: Paper Bag
- Members: Chris McCann; Jon Drew; Derek Tokar
- Past members: Ian Worang (died December 2021); Jake Fairley; Sam Goldberg
- Website: Uncut

Uncut is a Canadian indie rock band from Toronto. They have released two 12" singles and three full-length albums.

== History ==
Uncut formed as a duo consisting of Ian Worang and Jake Fairley in 2001. After the pair had released a 12" recording, Understanding The New Violence, in 2002, Fairley left to pursue a career as a DJ.

Worang developed Uncut into a full band with guitarists Chris McCann and Sam Goldberg, drummer Jon Drew and bassist Derek Tokar. After performing around southern Ontario, in 2004 Uncut released the album Those Who Were Hung Hang Here on Paper Bag Records. The band also released a single, Devotion.

In 2005, Uncut completed a short tour, after which the band recorded and released Modern Currencies in 2006. The album included songwriting by Worang, Tokar and Goldberg, as well as some backing vocals from Melissa Auf der Maur.

Uncut continues to perform, and in 2013 released a third album, Infinite Repeats.

Worang died in December 2021, at the age of 47.

== Band members ==
- Ian Worang (Guitar, Vocals)
- Chris McCann (Guitar, Vocals)
- Jon Drew (Drums)
- Derek Tokar (Bass, Vocals)

== Discography ==
- Understanding The New Violence (12"), 2002
- Devotion/Fluent And Pure/Over The Edge (12"), 2004
- Those Who Were Hung Hang Here, 2004
- Modern Currencies, 2006
- Infinite Repeats, 2013
