= For Those Who Stay =

Studio album by PS I Love You
- Released: July 22, 2014
- Genre: Pop
- Length: 38:41
- Label: Paper Bag

PS I Love You chronology
Death Dreams (2012)	For Those Who Stay (2014)

Professional ratings
Aggregate scores
Source	Rating
Metacritic	72/100
Review scores
Source	Rating
AllMusic	4/5 stars

For Those Who Stay is the third studio album by Canadian duo PS I Love You. It was released in July 2014 under Paper Bag Records.

== Track list ==
No.	Title	Length
1.	"In My Mind at Least"	2:43
2.	"Advice"	4:50
3.	"Bad Brain Day"	2:55
4.	"Limestone Radio"	2:52
5.	"For Those Who Stay"	6:29
6.	"Afraid of the Light"	4:23
7.	"Friends Forever"	3:30
8.	"More of the Same"	5:06
9.	"Hoarders"	5:53
