= Disco Romance =

Studio album by Sally Shapiro
- Released: 22 November 2006
- Genre: Italo disco; synthpop
- Length: 49:35 (CD); 40:52 (LP)
- Label: Diskokaine
- Producer: Johan Agebjörn

Sally Shapiro chronology
Disco Romance (2006)	Remix Romance Vol. 1 (2008)

Alternative cover
- North American cover

Singles from Disco Romance
- 1. "I'll Be by Your Side" Released: 12 May 2006; 2. "Anorak Christmas" Released: 4 December 2006; 3. "Jackie Jackie (Spend This Winter with Me)" Released: 25 February 2008; 4. "He Keeps Me Alive" Released: 2 May 2008

Professional ratings
Review scores
Source	Rating
AllMusic	4.5/5 stars
Paste	4/5 stars
Pitchfork	8.5/10
PopMatters	7/10
Slant Magazine	2.5/5 stars
Spin	4/5 stars
Stylus Magazine	B+
Tiny Mix Tapes	1.5/5 stars

Disco Romance is the debut studio album by Swedish electronic duo Sally Shapiro. It was released in Europe on 22 November 2006 by Diskokaine and in North America on 30 October 2007 by Paper Bag Records.

== Track listing ==
All tracks are written by Johan Agebjörn, except where noted

No.	Title	Writer(s)	Length
1.	"I'll Be by Your Side"		5:29
2.	"I Know"		6:13
3.	"Find My Soul"		4:52
4.	"Time to Let Go"		5:21
5.	"Anorak Christmas"	Roger Gunnarsson	4:18
6.	"Hold Me So Tight"		6:00
7.	"Find My Soul" (Norwegian Electrojazz Mix)		5:00
8.	"Sleep in My Arms"	Agebjörn; Erik van den Broek	5:39
9.	"I'll Be by Your Side" (Rude 66 808 Remix; not included on vinyl edition)		6:43

North American edition
No.	Title	Writer(s)	Length
1.	"I'll Be by Your Side" (Extended Mix)		7:54
2.	"I Know"		6:13
3.	"Find My Soul"		4:52
4.	"Time to Let Go"		5:21
5.	"Anorak Christmas"	Gunnarsson	4:18
6.	"He Keeps Me Alive"	Gunnarsson	3:53
7.	"Hold Me So Tight"		6:00
8.	"Skating in the Moonshine"		5:46
9.	"Jackie Jackie (Spend This Winter with Me)"	Agebjörn; Gunnarsson	4:00
10.	"Sleep in My Arms"	Agebjörn; Van den Broek	5:39

== Personnel ==
- Sally Shapiro – vocals
- Johan Agebjörn – producer, backing vocals (all tracks); mastering (track 5)
- Wolfram "marfloW" Eckert – executive producer
- Evelina Joëlson – backing vocals (track 5)
- Frida Klingberg – photography
- Patrick Pulsinger – mastering (tracks 1–4, 6–9)
- Q-Force – pre-mastering (track 5)
- Rude 66 – remix (track 9)
- SLL – mastering (track 5)

Additional personnel for the North American edition

- Anna Sanne Göransson – backing vocals (tracks 8, 9)
- Evelina Joëlson – backing vocals (tracks 5, 8, 9)
- Patrick Pulsinger – mastering (tracks 1–5, 7, 10)
- SLL – mastering (tracks 5, 6, 8, 9)
