= X-amounts =

x-amounts

Studio album by controller.controller
- Released: October 11, 2005
- Recorded: Signal to Noise
- Genres: Indie rock, dance-punk
- Length: 38:26
- Label: Paper Bag Records
- Producers: Rob Sanzo, controller.controller

Controller.controller chronology
| History (2004) | x-amounts (2005) |

Professional ratings
Review scores
| Source | Rating |
|---|---|
| AllMusic | 4/5 stars |
| PopMatters | 5/10 stars |

x-amounts is the second release and first full-length album from Canadian indie rock band controller.controller. It was released on October 11, 2005, in Canada by Paper Bag Records and in the United States on March 7, 2006.

== Track listing ==
All songs by controller.controller (Basnayake/Kaija/Llewellyn-Thomas/Morris/Scheven).

1. "Tigers not Daughters" – 3:16
2. "PF" – 3:23
3. "Poison/Safe" – 4:43
4. "Rooms" – 4:04
5. "Future Turtles" – 1:36
6. "Straight in the Head" – 4:31
7. "City of Daggers" – 4:08
8. "Heavy as a Heart" – 2:26
9. "BLK GLV" – 2:07
10. "The Raw No" – 3:49
11. "Magnetic Strip" – 4:23

== Personnel ==
- Nirmala Basnayake – vocals
- Scott Kaija – guitar, vocals
- Colwyn Llewellyn-Thomas – guitar
- Ronnie Morris – bass, vocals
- Jeff Scheven – drums, electronica, vocals
