= Dancing with Daggers =

Studio album by Magneta Lane
- Released: April 4, 2006
- Genres: Indie rock, pop punk
- Label: Paper Bag
- Producers: Al-P, Jesse F. Keeler

Magneta Lane chronology
The Constant Lover (2004)	Dancing with Daggers (2006)	Gambling with God (2009)

Dancing with Daggers is the debut studio album by the Canadian indie rock band Magneta Lane, released April 4, 2006 on Paper Bag Records. This album was released in a special bonus track edition on October 24, 2005 on Pony Canyon Records in Japan only.

== Songs ==
The album opens with the track "Bridge to Terabithia", named after Katherine Paterson's novel of the same name. The lyrics bear no significance to the novel nor does the theme of the music. "Broken Plates" is the first single released from the album, the second being "Wild Gardens".

== Reception ==
Professional ratings
Review scores
Source	Rating
Allmusic	4.5/5 stars
Pitchfork Media	(7.7/10)
PopMatters	8/10 stars
Stylus	B−

Reviews for the album were generally positive. Allmusic had nothing but the highest of praise for the album, saying "Each song is snappy, playful, and stylish, and that's what makes Dancing with Daggers work so well." They asserted that the songs have a rare originality, and said that Magenta Lane "lead the pack of new millennium girl groups" and "could very well be a modern day version of the Shangri-Las." Pitchfork and PopMatters both said that the album lacks a genuine show-stopper to compare to "The Constant Lover" from their debut EP, but that there are nonetheless plenty of standout moments. The reviewer for PopMatters also praised the album's exceptional brevity (less than a half-hour long). Stylus Magazine were less enthusiastic, asserting that the album is essentially one or two outstanding pieces surrounded by similar-sounding filler: "Dancing With Daggers could be re-released as "Wild Gardens," its best song, repeated thirteen times and I’d hardly bat an eye."

== Track listing ==
1. "Bridge to Terabithia" - 3:25
2. "Broken Plates" - 2:51
3. "Wild Gardens" - 3:16
4. "22" - 2:31
5. "Secrets Aren't So Bad" - 2:30
6. "Carnival in Spain" - 3:01
7. "Artistic Condition" - 2:10
8. "Daggers Out!" - 3:51
9. "The Better Plan" - 3:05
10. "Butterflies are Blue" - 3:10
11. "The Constant Lover" - 3:13 (Japanese Bonus Track)
12. "Follow Me" - 2:11 (Japanese Bonus Track)
