= Plague Recordings =

Independent record label

Plague Recordings (also known as Plague) is an independent record label formerly operating from Belgium specialising in ambient, industrial and experimental electronic music.

Plague Recordings was founded in 2007 and released albums from 2tokiislands (France), Audela (N/A), Ambient Temple of Imagination (USA), Manifesto (Sweden), Nathan Siter (Finland), Pump (UK), Sid Redlin (USA) and Wicked Messenger (Germany/Australia).

Over the years, two compilations saw the light of day. Artists included Maarten van der Vleuten (Netherlands), Scanner (UK), The Caretaker (UK/Germany), vidnaObmana (Belgium), Moljebka Pvlse (Sweden), Ondo (Sweden), Machinist & Mendel Kaelen (Netherlands).

The label's lift-off album May The Plague Be With You, an anonymous work featuring 3 tracks (Black Box Warning I, II, III), each 23 minutes long, has ever since intrigued drone faddists worldwide. Offered as free MP3 in 2009-2010, MTPBWY was legally downloaded > 7.000 times. Over the years several other albums were offered free of charge.

In 2010 the label went into hiatus focusing on transcendental activities. According to several online sources, Plague has planned 2 new releases by Wicked Messenger, scheduled in 2011.
