= The Constant Lover (EP) =

EP by Magneta Lane
- Released: October 12, 2004 (Canada); October 5, 2004 (US)
- Genre: Indie Rock, Alternative Rock
- Length: 20:36
- Label: Paper Bag
- Producer: Jon Drew

Magneta Lane chronology
| The Constant Lover (2004) | Dancing with Daggers (2006) |

The Constant Lover is the first EP by the Canadian indie-rock girl group Magneta Lane, released October 5, 2004 on Paper Bag Records.

== Track listing ==
1. "The Constant Lover" - 3:13
2. "Kissing Is Easy" - 3:25
3. "Medusa" - 3:38
4. "Their Party Days" - 2:37
5. "Mare of the Night" - 4:51
6. "Ugly Socialite" - 2:52

== Critical reception ==
Professional ratings
Review scores
| Source | Rating |
|---|---|
| Allmusic | 4/5 stars |
| Pitchfork Media | (7.9/10.0) |
| Stylus | (D+) |

The Constant Lover received mixed reviews from critics. MacKenzie Wilson of Allmusic said that the record finds the perfect balance between being innocent and provocative, and added that the EP isn't excessively enthusiastic or overly calculated. Joe Tangari of Pitchfork Media insisted that it "is an impressive, memorable debut by a band with a great instinct for developing songs for maximum impact." However, Stylus asserted that the album did little more than "rip-off" the band Pretty Girls Make Graves, and that both the album and the band themselves are blatantly calculated towards commercial success.
