= Sally Shapiro =

Swedish vocalist

- Origin: Gothenburg, Sweden
- Genres: Italo disco, synthpop
- Years active: 2006–2016, 2021–present
- Labels: Diskokaine, Permanent Vacation, Paper Bag, Husmus Media
- Members: Sally Shapiro; Johan Agebjörn
- Website: johanagebjorn.info/sally.html

Sally Shapiro is the pseudonym of a Swedish vocalist and the name of the Italo disco/synthpop duo composed of Shapiro and musician Johan Agebjörn. On 28 April 2016, Sally Shapiro announced the end of their 10-year career alongside the release of the final single "If You Ever Wanna Change Your Mind". They returned from retirement in January 2018 for a collaboration with Ryan Paris called "Love On Ice". In 2021, they signed with Italians Do It Better and announced the 2022 release of their fourth studio album Sad Cities.

== History ==
Shapiro grew up listening to Swedish pop and disco and the band was influenced by Eurobeat and Italo disco. Agebjörn shed some light on the choice of the fictional stage name in an October 2007 interview with Exclaim! magazine:

I chose [the name] Sally Shapiro because we were inspired by artists like Valerie Dore and Katy Gray, who also had a team of producers and writers behind them using the name of a singer as the title for the project."

— Johan Agebjörn

Sally Shapiro's debut album, 2007's Disco Romance, was produced by Agebjörn. The album received strong reviews, and Shapiro was championed by many prominent music blogs including Pitchfork. The album was released in North America on 16 October 2007 by Canadian-based indie label Paper Bag Records; it is a ten-track album featuring artwork by Canadian designer Geoff Wilson.

Shapiro is notable for shunning publicity and has never revealed her real name. However, in an interview with Swedish webzine Judy in September 2007, she talked for the first time about considering performing live:

What if I did a show in Italy, where there's no-one I know. If I just went onto the stage, did my thing and left without having any further contact if I didn't want to. Then I'd still be able to keep myself outside of it and just regard it as Sally's thing.

— Sally Shapiro

In spring 2008, Sally Shapiro went on a short DJ tour, but on a February 2009 post on Sally Shapiro's Myspace blog, Agebjörn stated that Sally would not perform again:

Sally felt that standing on stage was not her thing, and that life on tour in general didn't interest her. It was not just about shyness, it was as much about a disinterest in endless travelling and working hours in the middle of the night. Some of the live/DJ requests turned into Johan solo DJ gigs, most didn't happen at all. Many people in the music industry think it's commercially stupid, we lose a lot of opportunities to gain listeners and sell records. And we guess they are right. We also have the feeling of making our listeners (the ones that we met were really nice) disappointed. But we believe that you shouldn't take opportunities just because they exist, if it's not what you really want to do. What if you just want to be a normal person with a normal job, record songs in the weekends, and spend the holidays picking blueberries instead of going on tour.

— Johan Agebjörn

On 15 April 2008, Sally Shapiro's remix album Remix Romance Vol. 1 was released worldwide by Paper Bag Records. Some of the names on this remix album are Junior Boys, Jon Brooks, Lindstrøm, Holy Fuck and Juan Maclean.

Quickly following Vol. 1, Remix Romance Vol. 2 was released on 17 June 2008. It contains remixes by Dntel, The Russian Futurists, Solvent and Alexander Robotnick. This volume is only available as a download.

Sally Shapiro's single "Miracle" was released on 16 June 2009. It is similar in style to previous Shapiro singles.

Their second studio album, My Guilty Pleasure, was released in August 2009. Like the previous work, it was recorded alone.

In 2011, the duo revealed that they had been working on new material to be released in the near future. In 2012, they officially announced their third album, "Somewhere Else", which was released in 2013. The album was produced by Agebjörn, and featured collaborations with Cloetta Paris' Roger Gunnarsson and Le Prix. The album's leading single, "What Can I Do", was released in December 2012.

In 2016, Sally Shapiro released a single entitled "If You Ever Wanna Change Your Mind", intending it to be their last song.

In June 2021, the duo released a new single, "Fading Away", reversing their decision to retire. A new album entitled Sad Cities was released on 18 February 2022.

Sally Shapiro's fifth record, Ready to Live a Lie, was announced on 15 March 2025, and was released on 30 May.

== Discography ==
=== Studio albums ===
- Disco Romance (2006)
- My Guilty Pleasure (2009)
- Somewhere Else (2013)
- Sad Cities (2022)
- Ready to Live a Lie (2025)

=== Compilation albums ===
- The Collection (2016)

=== Remix albums ===
- Remix Romance Vol. 1 (2008)
- Remix Romance Vol. 2 (2008)
- My Guilty Pleasure – Remixes (2010)
- Elsewhere (2013)
- Sweetened (2013)

=== Singles ===
- "I'll Be By Your Side" (2006)
- "Anorak Christmas" (2006)
- "Jackie Jackie (Spend This Winter with Me)" (2008)
- "Spacer Woman from Mars" (with Johan Agebjörn, Rude 66 and Elitechnique) (2008)
- "He Keeps Me Alive" (2008)
- "Miracle" (2009)
- "Love in July" (2009)
- "The Explorers" (CFCF featuring Sally Shapiro) (2009)
- "Don't Be Afraid" (Anoraak featuring Sally Shapiro) (2010)
- "Casablanca Nights" (Johan Agebjörn featuring Lovelock & Sally Shapiro) (2011)
- "Alice" (Johan Agebjörn featuring Le Prix, Fred Ventura & Sally Shapiro) (2011)
- "Spacer Woman From Mars" (Johan Agebjörn featuring Sally Shapiro) (2011)
- "What Can I Do" (2012)
- "Starman (featuring Electric Youth)" (2013)
- "If You Ever Wanna Change Your Mind" (2016)
- "Fading Away" (2021)
- "Forget About You" (2021)
- "Rent" (Pet Shop Boys cover, 2023)
