= Controller.controller =

Canadian indie rock band

controller.controller

Background information
- Origin: Toronto, Ontario, Canada
- Genres: Indie rock, dance-punk
- Years active: 2002–2006; 2015; 2024
- Label: New Romantic
- Members: Nirmala Basnayake; Colwyn Llewellyn-Thomas; Scott Kaija; Ronnie Morris; Jeff Scheven

controller.controller are a Canadian indie rock band from Toronto, Ontario. The band consisted of vocalist Nirmala Basnayake, guitarists Colwyn Llewellyn-Thomas and Scott Kaija, bassist Ronnie Morris and drummer Jeff Scheven. The band took its name from a song by Shotmaker.

== History ==
The band formed in 2002, and played their first shows using the name The Prefix. Their rhythmic post-punk style had been compared by critics to Joy Division, The Slits and Public Image Ltd.

Their debut album, History, was released on Paper Bag Records in 2004. The follow-up album, X-Amounts, was released October 11, 2005. Also in 2005, Basnayake participated in Ladeez Quire, an improvisational music show that also featured Sook-Yin Lee and Elisha Lim.

After the release of X-Amounts, the band went on a tour around North America and the UK to support the album.

In October 2006, Basnayake decided to leave the band, and this resulted in its disbanding. Members Jeff Scheven and Ronnie Morris formed the new band Lioness with vocalist Vanessa Fischer in 2007, while Scott Kaija formed the new band Medallions with vocalist/guitarist John Hunter, drummer Mick Jackson and Daniel Brooks. Basnayake remained an occasional contributor to one-off musical projects, most notably Toronto band Stop Die Resuscitate's 2009 single "Measurements".

The band reunited in February 2015 for a reunion show at Sneaky Dee's, as part of the 15th anniversary of Toronto's influential Wavelength concert series. Shortly thereafter Morris suffered a disabling stroke.

The band reunited again in February 2024 for a show at Drake Hotel, curated by Brendan Canning. Morris has rejoined the band after recovering from strokes.

== Discography ==
- History (2004)
- X-Amounts (2005)

== See also ==
- Music of Canada
- Canadian rock
- List of bands from Canada
- List of Canadian musicians
- Category:Canadian musical groups
