= My Guilty Pleasure =

Studio album by Sally Shapiro
- Released: 21 August 2009
- Recorded: 2009
- Genre: Italo disco, synthpop
- Length: 46:35
- Label: Permanent Vacation
- Producer: Johan Agebjörn, Roger Gunnarsson, Tensnake

Sally Shapiro chronology
Remix Romance Vol. 2 (2008)	My Guilty Pleasure (2009)	My Guilty Pleasure – Remixes (2010)

Singles from My Guilty Pleasure
- 1. "Miracle" Released: 16 June 2009; 2. "Love in July" Released: 14 July 2009

Professional ratings
Review scores
Source	Rating
Allmusic	3.5/5 stars
The A.V. Club	(C+)
musicOMH	3.5/5 stars
Now	(3/5)
The Phoenix	1.5/5 stars
Pitchfork Media	(6.6/10)
PopMatters	(6/10)
Slant Magazine	2.5/5 stars
Tiny Mix Tapes	2.5/5 stars
URB	2.5/5 stars

My Guilty Pleasure is the second studio album by Swedish electronic duo Sally Shapiro. It was released on 21 August 2009 by Permanent Vacation.

== Track listing ==
No.	Title	Writer(s)	Length
1.	"Swimming Through the Blue Lagoon"	Johan Agebjörn	2:28
2.	"Looking at the Stars"	Agebjörn, Roger Gunnarsson	5:27
3.	"Love in July"	Agebjörn, Gunnarsson	3:48
4.	"My Fantasy"	Agebjörn	3:44
5.	"Let It Show"	Agebjörn	5:43
6.	"Moonlight Dance"	Agebjörn	4:05
7.	"Save Your Love"	Gunnarsson, Matilda Weibe	3:15
8.	"He Keeps Me Alive" (Extended Version) (not on North American version and LP)	Gunnarsson	4:19
9.	"Dying in Africa"	Nicolas Makelberge, Johan Tuvesson	4:55
10.	"Jackie Jackie" (not on North American version, LP and cassette)	Agebjörn, Gunnarsson	3:54
11.	"Miracle"	Agebjörn, Gunnarsson	4:57

Swedish limited cassette edition bonus track
No.	Title	Length
11.	"Sally reviews Eurovision Song Contest 1989"	1:35

Philippine bonus track
No.	Title	Length
12.	"Jackie Junior" (Junior Boys Dub Remix)	5:02

iTunes bonus tracks
No.	Title	Writer(s)	Length
10.	"My Fantasy" (Dyylan's Secret Remix)	Agebjörn	9:47
11.	"Love in July" (Video)		3:41

Beatport bonus track
No.	Title	Writer(s)	Length
10.	"Miracle" (Swedish Remix)	Agebjörn, Gunnarsson	6:47

CD Baby digital bonus tracks
No.	Title	Writer(s)	Length
12.	"Love in July" (CFCF Remix)	Agebjörn, Gunnarsson	3:58
13.	"My Fantasy" (Dyylan's Secret Remix)	Agebjörn	9:48

== Personnel ==
- Sally Shapiro – vocals
- Johan Agebjörn – producer (tracks 1–5, 7–11)
- Jon Brooks – mastering
- Anna Sanne Göransson – backing vocals (track 10)
- Roger Gunnarsson – co-producer (tracks 3, 7, 11)
- Evelina Joëlson – backing vocals (track 5)
- Frida Klingberg – photography
- Cloetta Paris – backing vocals (track 3)
- Clive Reynolds – backing vocals (track 3)
- Mathias Schuckert – design
- Skatebård – synth brass pad (track 8)
- SLL – pre-mastering (tracks 8, 10)
- Tensnake – producer (track 6)

== Release history ==
Country	Date	Label	Format
Germany	21 August 2009	Permanent Vacation	CD, digital download
United Kingdom	24 August 2009	Permanent Vacation	CD, digital download
Canada	25 August 2009	Paper Bag Records	CD, LP, digital download
United States	25 August 2009	Paper Bag Records	CD, LP, digital download
Sweden	25 August 2009	Husmus Media	Cassette, digital download
