= Maarten van der Vleuten =

Dutch producer, composrer, and recording artist

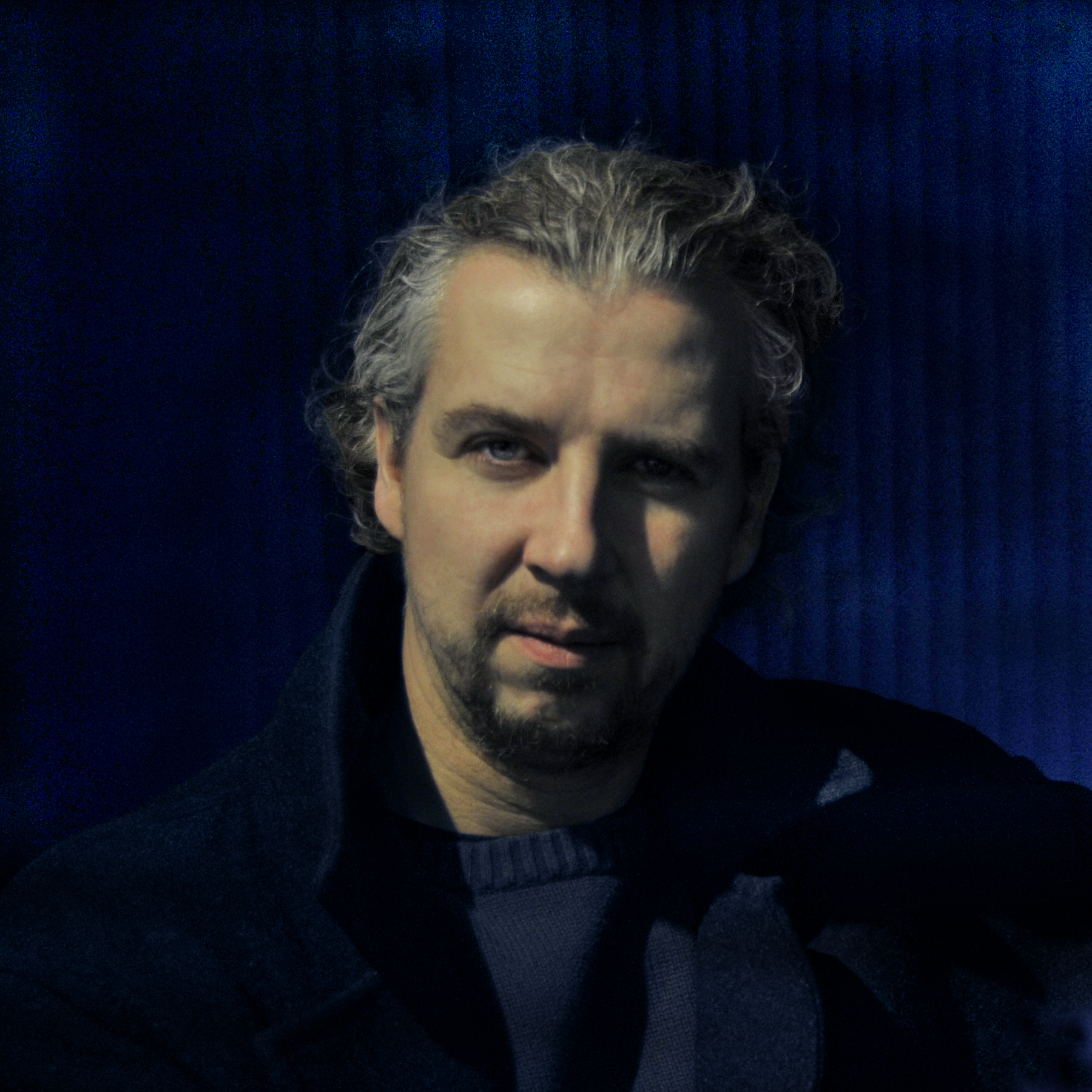

Maarten van der Vleuten (Dutch pronunciation: [ˈmaːrtə(ɱ) vɑn dər ˈvløːtə(n)]) is a Dutch producer, composer and recording artist born in Vught, The Netherlands in 1967. Between 1987 and 2007 he used over two dozens of aliases, producing Detroit techno, electro, house, experimental and ambient music.

In early 2008 he announced that he would only use his real name for future releases. He recorded for R&S Records, Outrage Recordings, Apollo Records (Belgium), Djax-Up-Beats, See Saw, ESP and Klang Elektronik to name just a few.

Since 1996 he is also releasing music on his own label Signum Recordings (and its two sublabels Passiflora and Glam). Maarten's musical vision knows no limits: working in his own studio, he's constantly experimenting and exploring all aspects of (danceable) music, looking for innovation and bringing new angles to it. Due to his experimental vision towards his music, Van Der Vleuten's productions are not mainstream material. As a result of that he has gained more credits from within the "underground" scene. Or as the database of the Dutch Rock & Pop Institute writes; "one of the pioneers of the dutch dance scene".

== Aliases ==
All known aliases in alphabetical order: 48V Phantom Power, Cliche, Cryptic, DJ Dusk, DJ G-Spot, Dutch Department Of Techno, E144, E414, Error 144, Error 441, Flash Back, Flux, Frantic, G.S.G, Gangrene, In-Existence, Integrity, Major Malfunction, N.Cantado, The Noise Architect, Orpheus, Party Marty, Pultec, V48, Vandervleuten, Zimt.

=== In-Existence ===
"In-Existence" is the alias van der Vleuten uses for his ambient-related musical projects. In 1993 the debut album Moonwater by In-Existence was released on the ambient label Apollo Records (Belgium), a subsidiary of R&S Records. (Musically a mix between Detroit techno and ambient) On Van Der Vleuten's own label Signum Recordings the follow-up was released 1998; Private Rituals. A mix of ambient, worldmusic and classical. Guest musicians that appear on the album are; Edwin Paanakker, Eddie Persijn, Frans Friedrich and Choir Jeroen Bosch. The album Vow of Silence, on Tonefloat, musically referred to the debut with ambient-techno influences. The fourth album ...Of Truth, Eternal Beauty And Nought... again sounded familiar with the ambient-techno influences. The opening track Capezzoli Di Venere is a 45-minute, almost neo-romantic sounding piece of spacious sounds and rhythmic sequences which is quite a contradiction to the extremely dark final title I Have This Pain. The tone has been set and the last In-Existence album De Verkenningen continues with dark, droned sounds. The last track on the album, Vierde Verkenning is used by Dutch contemporary artist Frank Havermans and can be heard inside the art-installation KAPKAR / TT-C2P. The installation is part of the exhibition Tangible Traces- Dutch Architecture and Design by Netherlands Architecture Instituut and will travel around the world for two years, opening at November 10, 2007, during the Seventh São Paulo Biennale of Architecture in Brazil. Up to now the exhibition travelled to Vienna (Austria) and Hong Kong.

== Discography ==
=== 2013 ===
Internaut (Shipwrec) 12"
Auseinander (Signum) 7"

=== 2012 ===
Are You Worthy? (Tonefloat) CD
Systematically Declassified 2 (Signum) 15xwav
Systematically Declassified (Signum) 15xwav
Summer Of 909 (In Plain Sight) 12"
MVDV No Religion (Signum) wav single

=== 2011 ===
The Scars Remain (Tonefloat) 2xLP

=== 2010 ===
A True & Faithful Relation Of What Passed For Many Years Between Dr. John Dee And Some Spirits (Evening Of Light) CD
MVDV CTRL ep (Shipwrec) 12"

=== 2009 ===
ECT For Piano (Signum) CD + Booklet
Een Onvermoede Bocht (Signum) CD + Book (collaboration with Ignace Schretlen)

=== 2008 ===
High Intolerance Towards Low Energies (ToneFloat) LP

=== 2007 ===
Kurt's Zimmer Publikation (Signum) CDs + Book
Reptv (track appears on compilation New Deal) (Eat Concrete) 12"

=== 2006 ===
In-Existence De Verkenningen (Signum) CD
In-Existence ...Of Truth, Eternal Beauty And Nought... (Signum) CD
Kremahitz (Mighty Robot) 12" (featuring Rude 66 and Aardvarck)
Major Malfunction Donderdozen (Signum) MP3
Vandervleuten Sex Machines (Glam) MP3

=== 2005 ===
In-Existence Vow Of Silence (ToneFloat/C) LP
Maarten van der Vleuten Vs The Use Of Ashes The Ice Mixes (Snavel) 2x12" 2005

=== 2002 ===
Flux Laiad (Signum) CD + Booklet

=== 2001 ===
Vandervleuten The Masterplan Remixes (Glam) 12"
V48 Five (Passiflora) 12"
Vandervleuten Variations On A "Love Me" Theme (Glam) 12"

=== 2000 ===
V48 Third (Passiflora) 12"
V48 No. 4 (Passiflora) 12"

=== 1999 ===
V48 First Flower (Passiflora) 12"
V48 2 (Passiflora) 12"
E 144 Ungestillt (Zodiak Commune) 12" (featuring Maarten Blom)

=== 1998 ===
Flux Bloemendael Effect (Signum) 12"
In-Existence Private Rituals (Signum) CD

=== 1997 ===
Flux Zah Ath (Signum) 12"

=== 1996 ===
Flux Variations On Loops (Signum) 12"
Phlux Hi-Fi Stereo ! (Signum) 12"
Flux Morphing Of Man (Signum) 12"
Frantic E.F.T. Lovers (XS) 12"
Maarten & Tjeerd Lunetten E.P. (U-Trax) 12" (co-production with Tjeerd Verbeek)

=== 1995 ===
Error 441 Mmmmmmm (Beton) 12"
Flux Sonoprinter E.P. (Mekanik) 12"
Flux The Mindboggling Mystery (Klang Elektronik) 12"
Cryptic Unconscious E.P. (Paraphrase) 12"
Major Malfunction Private Performances (Djax) 12"

=== 1993 ===
In-Existence Moonwater (Apollo) CD + 2xLP
Major Malfunction House Shield Re-Activated (track appears on Surreal Sound 2) (Surreal Sound) MC

=== 1992 ===
Cliche Cliche Trax (Djax) 12" (featuring Aardvarck)
G.S.G. (Glue Sniffing Gerald) Trip Trax (Djax) 12"
Zimt Set Into A Trance (Outrage) 12"
Zimt Blue Note (Outrage) 12"
Zimt Better Than Your Dream (Outrage) 12"
Flux True Feelings (Outrage) 12"
Integrity The Way I Live (Outrage) 12"
Integrity Living In A Fantasy (Outrage) 12" (featuring Aardvarck)
Pultec Die Menschmachine (Outrage) 12"
Flashback Feel The Bass (See Saw/Billytron) 12" (featuring Sandy Kandou)
48V Phantom Power Graffity (R&S) 12"
Maarten van der Vleuten & David Morley TZ 7 (TZ) 12"
Gangrene Sickness E.P. (See Saw) 12"
D.J. Dusk Chique E.P. (See Saw) 12"

=== 1991 ===
48V Phantom Power Feel D-Base (R&S) 12"
Orpheus Saludos (R&S) 12" (featuring Fierce Ruling Diva)
Major Malfunction Magic Moments (Djax) 12"
Major Malfunction ...Gives You Central House (Djax) 12"
TZ 2 (TZ) 12"
DDT (Dutch Department Of Techno) / Major Malfunction Starwood Party E.P. (See Saw) 12" (featuring Human Beings, Terrace, Speedy J, Exposure, Gijs Vroom, Party Atmosphere)

=== 1987 ===
The Noise Architect Art As Terrorism (MAWA) MC

=== Exclusive tracks on compilations ===
48V Spargel Brothers Bitten (on Spargel Trax Vol. 4) (Don't Be Afraid) 12" 2013
Flux Expanding Universe (on El Mondo Ambiente, Dino Music. The Ambient Groove Volume 3, ESP Records. The Ambient Groove Volume 3, Sun Music. Ambient Soundscapes Volume One, Sun Music. Tech Lounge (The Essential Underground Edition), CNR Music.) CD/2CD/3CD/MC 1994, 1995, 1996, 2003
Zimt V.H. (on Virtual Mellow, Halley. Virtual Mellow 2, Halley. This Is Mellow 7, Precious.)
In-Existence Herbe Mystique (on Surreal Sound Tape Vol. 2) (Surreal Sound) MC 1995
Integrity Lust (on Rave On) (Dino Music) CD/2xCD/MC 1992

=== Co-production ===
Dirk Serries & Maarten van der Vleuten Murmlefish (on TF100) (ToneFloat) 2x10" 2011
Aardvarck 2nd Groove 2 The Same Nation (Djax) 12" 1993 (appearing as Party Marty, animal engineer)
Mantrax Scarlet Circus (R&S/White) 12" 1991 (scarlet circus co-production with Renaat Vandepapeliere and David Morley)

=== Remixes ===
French Theory - Kids In Belgium Remixes (Up In The Clouds Remix) (Number Nine/Signum) 3xWAV, 2012
Various- May The Plague Be With You (Black Box Warning {Through The Cracks In The Box Mix}, Maarten van der Vleuten) (Plague Recordings) 7xMP3, 2009
Hydro- Aquarhythms (Hydr(o)remix by D.J. joost & Flux) (Phono) CD + 2xLP 1995
HAOS- Dance For The Future (Beton Mix by M. vd Vleuten) (Direct Drive) 12" 1995
Trance Induction- Capita Selecta (E T Welcome Song 2 Flux Remix) (Prime) 12" 1994
Trance Induction- Electrickery (Robogroove III remix) (Prime/Guerilla) CD + 2xLP 1993
Trance Induction- Advanced Sonic Rituals E.P. (Robogroove Flux remix) (Prime) 12" 1993
Space Trax- Bounce (Disease mix & Migraine mix by Gangrene) (Music Man) 12" 1993
C3PO- Heaven's Ritual (Maarten mix 1 & Maarten mix 2) (See Saw) 12" 1993
Hole In One- Tales from the Planet Onhcet E.P. (Close Encounters of the 4th Kind, Major Malfunction of the 4th kind remix) (see Saw) 12" 1992
Toxit- Toxit E.P. (Some Mushrooms Approach, Major Malfunction Remix) (See Saw) 12" 1992
Hole in One- X-Paradise remixes E.P. (X-Paradise, D.J. G-Spot mix & D.J. Dusk (P&D) mix) (See Saw/Downtown) 12"
Transform- Transform (G-Spot Transform(ed) mix) (See Saw) 12" 1992
Transform- Transformation (The Remixes) E.P. (Transformation, G.Spot Mark II Mix) (See Saw) 2x12" 1992
Hole in One- First Hole E.P. (Weird Science, Major Malfunction mix) (See Saw) 12" 1992
Ralphie Dee & Dino Blade- Calypso Interlude (G-Spot mix) (Music Man) 12" 1992
Human Resource- Dominator Re-Remixes E.P. (Dominator, Maarten van der Vleuten mix) (R&S) 12" 1991

== See also ==
- List of ambient music artists
