= Vestbjerg =

- Town
- Location in Denmark Vestbjerg (North Jutland Region)
- Coordinates: 57°7′55″N 9°57′50″E
- Country: Denmark
- Region: North Jutland Region
- Municipality: Aalborg Municipality

Area
  - Urban: 1.72 km^{2} (0.66 sq mi)

Population (2026)
  - Urban: 3,091
  - Urban density: 1,800/km^{2} (4,650/sq mi)
  - Gender: 1,533 males and 1,558 females
- Time zone: UTC+1 (CET)
  - Summer (DST): UTC+2 (CEST)
- Postal code: DK-9380 Vestbjerg

Vestbjerg is a town and satellite community just outside Aalborg, Denmark. Located some 11 km (6.8 mi) north of Aalborg's city centre, it belongs to the Municipality of Aalborg in the North Jutland Region. Vestbjerg has a population of 3,091 (1 January 2026).
