= Alexander Robotnick =

Italian electronic musician

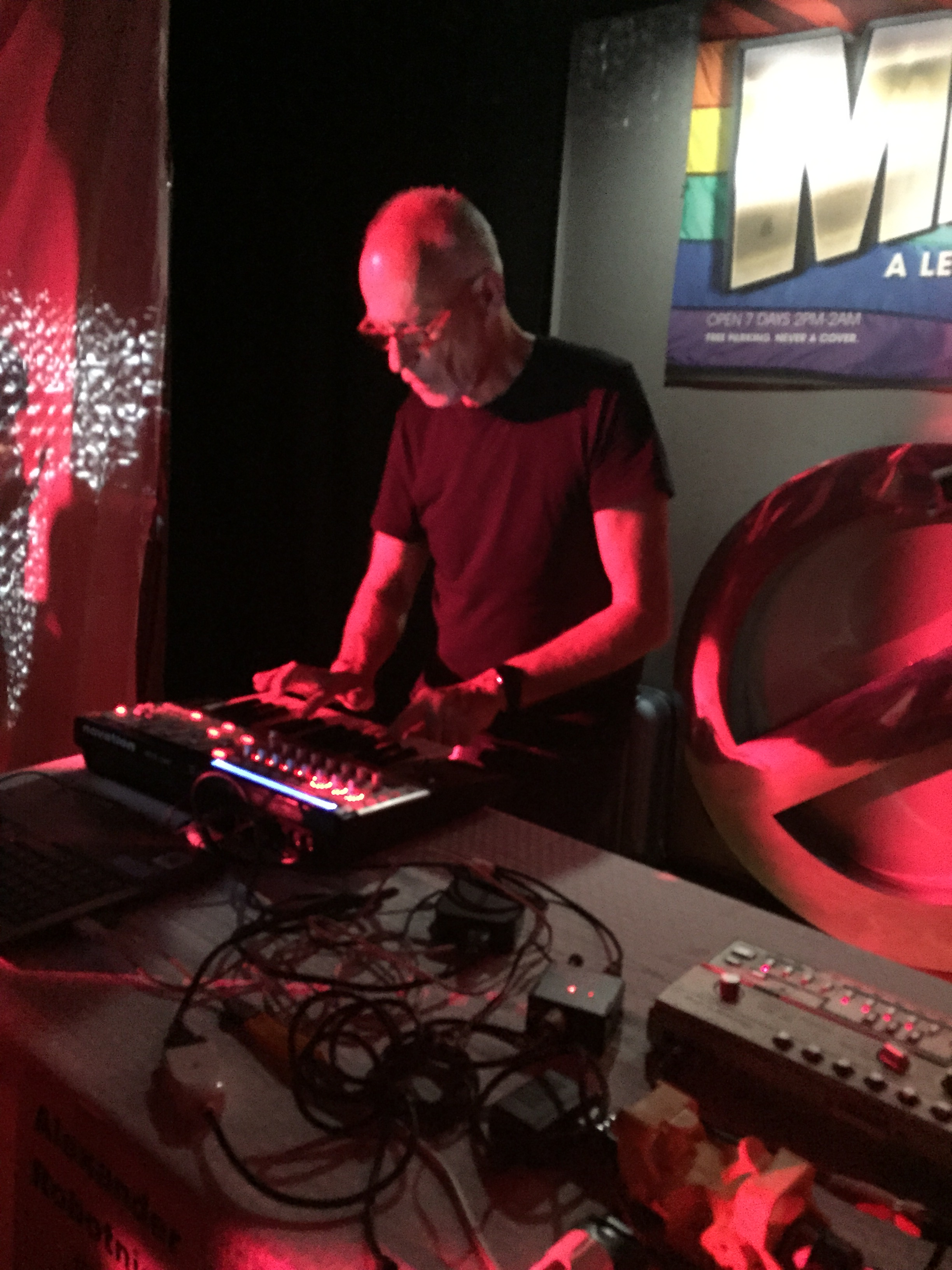
Alexander Robotnick at Menjos 2015

Maurizio Dami, known professionally as Alexander Robotnick, is an Italian electronic musician. He made his debut on the Italian music scene as the founding member of Avida, a dance-cabaret band featuring Daniele Trambusti and Stefano Fuochi.

== Biography ==
In 1983 he released the track "Problèmes d'amour", published first by the Italian label Materiali Sonori and then by Sire-Wea. "Problèmes d'amour" went on to become a "cult track" of dance music. In 1984 he joined "Giovanotti Mondani Meccanici" a multimedia-oriented group and composed soundtracks for theatre works, videos and video-installations. He also composed soundtracks for films and theatre works by Italian directors such as Alessandro Benvenuti, Antonio Climati, Marco Mattolini, and Marco Risi.

In 1987 he turned his interest to World Music, and for the next decade collaborated with African, Kurdish and Indian musicians. In 1994 Robotnick began to work with the Indian-Italian band "Govinda" leading to the production of two tracks "Devotion" and "Transcendental Ecstasy" for Govinda's first album Selling India By the Pound.

In summer 1995 he conceived and organized the first Ambient Music Festival in Florence at Anfiteatro delle Cascine. In 1996, with Nazar Abdulla and Rashmi Bhatt, he created The Third Planet, a multi-ethnic band that blended traditional music from Kurdistan Algeria and India with modern sounds. With The Third Planet, he produced two albums, Kurdistani and The Third Planet. The band gave numerous concerts in Italy.

In 1997 his collaboration with Lapo Lombardi and Ranieri Cerelli lead to the "Alkemya" project, releasing an album with CNI. In 2000 he created his own label, Hot Elephant Music. At the same time, he and Ludus Pinsky (Lapo Lombardi) explored new sounds and technologies, resulting in the production of Underwater Café. He also produced E.A.S.Y. vol.1 (Elephants Are Sometimes Young).

In 2002 he returned to the electro style of his musical début, producing Oh no...Robotnick in collaboration with Max Durante. In 2002 he released Melt in Time, the third album by The Third Planet in collaboration with Nazar, Paolo Casu, Arup Kanti Das and Smail Kouider.

In summer 2003 he worked with Kiko and The Hacker on a new track, "Viens Chez Moi". In October 2003 he published Rare Robotnick's a collection of his vintage tracks. In February 2005, with Ludus Pinsky (Lapo Lombardi), he released Italcimenti – Under Construction. In October 2005 he started his collaboration with Creme Organization (NL). They released Krypta 1982 (Rare Robotnick's 2) a couple of 12" including a remix by Bangkok Impact (Clone distribution). In May 2007 he released a CD, My La(te)st Album (Hot Elephant Music). In March 2008 he released I'm getting lost in my brain, a compilation of remixes taken by Detroit Grand Pubahs, Kompute, Microthol, Robosonic, Lore J, Italcimenti, Alexander Robotnick from his latest album. In 2008 he remixed Little Boots' track "Stuck On Repeat" released in December 2008. In March 2009 This Is Music LTD released "Obsession For The Disco Freaks".

In February 2009 Alexander Robotnick and Ludus Pinsky assembled their personal analog synths to organize and perform an analog session. Intending to recreate the purely analog sound of the 1970s and early 1980s. The DVD+CD was released by This Is Music LTD in June 2010: The Analog Session.

== See also ==
- Italo disco
