= When the Deer Wore Blue =

When The Deer Wore Blue is an album by Figurines, released in 2007.

== Track listing ==
1. "Childhood Verse" – 3:47
2. "The Air We Breathe" – 3:47
3. "Hey, Girl" – 2:34
4. "Drove you Miles" – 3:43
5. "Let's Head Out" – 3:01
6. "Good Old Friends" – 3:59
7. "Drankard's Dream" – 7:29
8. "Half Awake, Half Aware" – 2:10
9. "Angles of the Bayou" – 4:40
10. "Bee Dee" – 3:18
11. "Cheap Place to Spend the Night" – 4:24
12. "Lips of the Soldier" – 2:47
13. "Everyone" (hidden track) – 2:30
