= Raphaelle Standell-Preston =

Canadian musician and songwriter (born 1990)

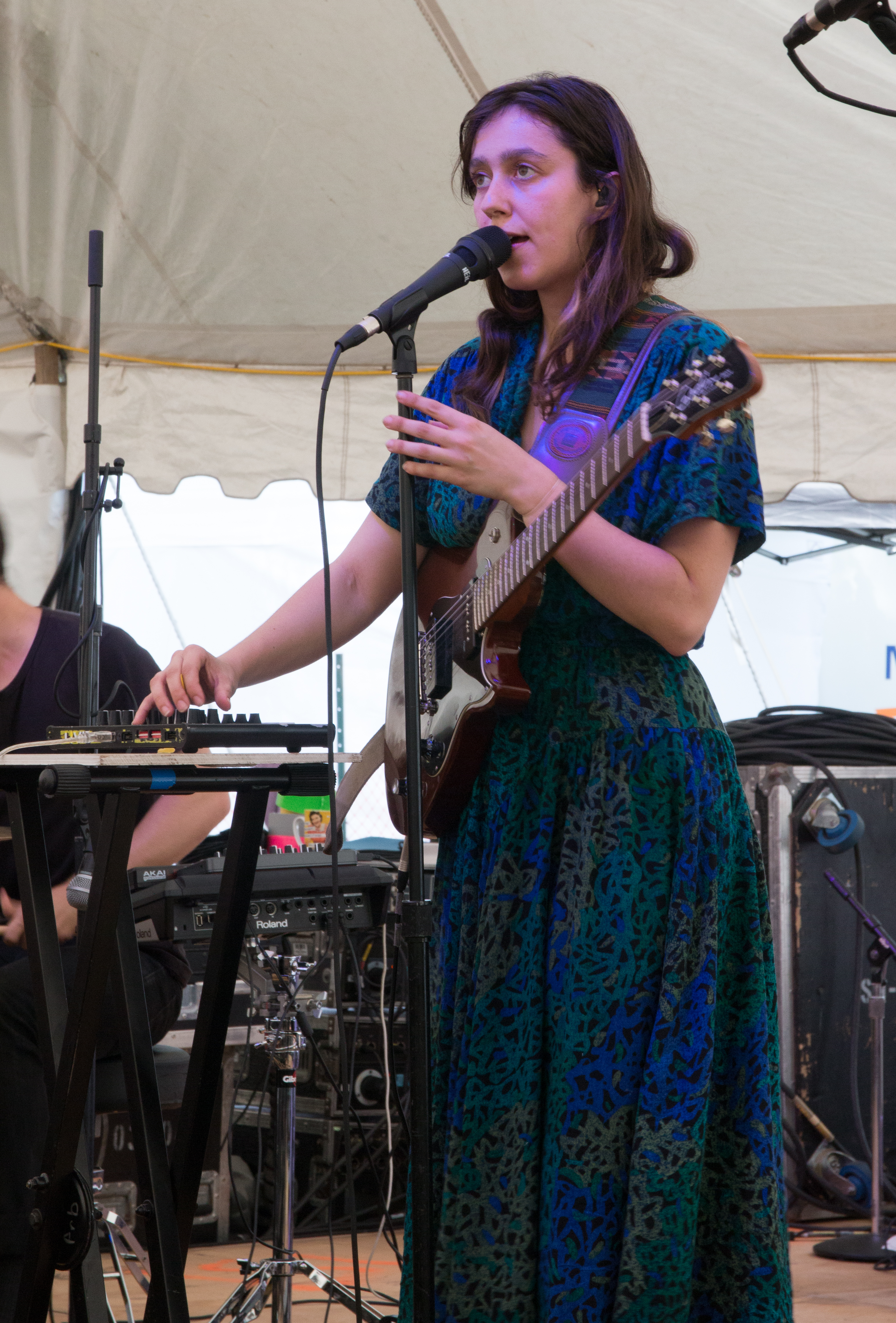
- Standell-Preston, as part of BRAIDS, performing at the 2015 Hillside Festival

Background information
- Born: Raphaelle Alexandria Standell-Preston; February 1, 1990 (age 36)
- Origin: Calgary, Alberta, Canada
- Genres: Ambient pop, electronic, indie rock, art rock
- Occupations: Musician, singer-songwriter
- Instruments: Vocals, guitar, piano, keyboards, clarinet, trumpet
- Years active: 2006–present
- Labels: Flemish Eye, Kanine, Full Time Hobby, Arbutus Records

Raphaelle Standell-Preston (born February 1, 1990) is a Canadian musician and songwriter, currently the frontwoman of Braids and Blue Hawaii. She releases solo music under the name Indiensoci. Her vocal style has been described as slipping "from exquisite sweetness to Björk-like yelps".

== Beginnings ==
Standell-Preston listened to Top 40 music while growing up and continues to love pop. She credited former Braids bandmate Katie Lee for introducing her to "music which is not on the radio". She played clarinet and trumpet in her school bands, before moving on to guitar. In 2012, she recalled her entry into music as having been brought about by switching "through a lot of different artistic endeavours. I wanted to be a painter, I wanted to be a dancer and I wanted to be an actor, then I just found music". Her first notable band was Calgary indie outfit Jane Vain and the Dark Matter, with whom she played in 2007.

== Influences and themes ==
Standell-Preston has stated that the pop music she listened to as a teenager still influences her writing, in which she focuses on producing hooks, but without catchiness being central to her melodies. In 2013, she named Aphex Twin, Stephan Bodzin, Max Cooper, Pantha du Prince, and Burial as influences. She has described her lyrics as "dirty" and "graphic" and also revealed that her struggle with depression influences her lyrics. She described her lyric-writing process as being "a lot of the time, I'll sing for 20 minutes, then I'll go back and review all the words that I said and I'll type them up. I'll find a pattern or a theme. I'll start paring things together and see the intent of what I was trying to have during that outburst". Standell-Preston cited labelmate Claire Boucher as an inspiration to her as a person, saying, "She is able to be really real, but then have this project that is so other-worldly and the two work really beautifully together. It's something I really look up to a lot when it comes to my personal image".

== Braids ==
=== Beginnings and Native Speaker (2006–2011) ===
Austin Tufts was the first future member of Braids who Standell-Preston met. The two met at a junior high school they were attending in Calgary, Alberta, Canada. The pair moved on to Western Canada High School, where they met Lee, Taylor Smith and Vince Man. The five formed The Neighbourhood Council in 2006, during their final year of high school. Standell-Preston fronted the band as lead singer and guitarist, handling the "delivery and emotional content" of the music in addition to writing the lyrics.

While putting off university, the band quickly picked up steam, intensively rehearsing, writing and performing at the Calgary Folk Music Festival and at Sled Island in 2007. They released their first EP, Set Pieces, in July 2008. After the release of the EP, and their rechristening as Braids, each member of the band was accepted into McGill University in Montreal, with Standell-Preston turning down the offer and remaining in Calgary.

She later moved to Montreal to reunite with her bandmates. Of the musical atmosphere in Montreal, she said, "In Calgary it's really looked down upon if you don't have a normal job, a nice house and a normal car, but here you're considered a nobody if you give in to that". After signing to Arbutus Records, the band's debut album, Native Speaker, was released in January 2011, winning critical acclaim and Juno Award nominations for Best Alternative Album and Best New New Group. The album was also shortlisted for the 2011 Polaris Music Prize. In August 2013, Standell-Preston said, "With Native Speaker, everything besides the title track is so angry. I was so upset and felt like the world was really unfair".

=== Flourish // Perish and Deep in the Iris (2012–present) ===
Standell-Preston returned to Montreal in 2012 to record her second album Flourish // Perish. The period was overshadowed by the breakdown of Standell-Preston's friendship with Lee, which resulted in a bitter split and resulted in Lee leaving Braids. Looking back in December 2013, Standell-Preston said, "The band really felt like it was going to end and we all had to make that decision. It's been really hard, I really, really miss her and I think about her".

The album was recorded in the garage below the house the band shared and featured a prominent electronic direction. After the "angry" Native Speaker, Standell-Preston realised that after being in such a painful situation during the early stages of the making of Flourish // Perish, she needed to make an effort "to be more aware of beauty, in my life and my lyrics" on the album. The album was a different experience for her musically as well, abandoning the guitar for all but one song, "In Kind", instead focusing on keyboards.

The album was released in August 2013 to critical acclaim. After the release of the album, Standell-Preston expressed a desire to return to playing guitar again, saying, "I need to abandon something in order to realise just how much I appreciate it".

As Braids' Flourish // Perish tour neared its end in December 2013, Standell-Preston revealed that after recording the album in the confines of a garage, "for our next record, we want to try and embrace open space. We want to go to Arizona and rent out some weird place in the middle of the desert and just have endless space". The band recorded their third album, Deep in the Iris, throughout the first half of 2014 in Arizona, New York and Vermont.

== Blue Hawaii ==
A meeting and relationship with Alex "Agor" Kerby (a.k.a. Alex Cowan) in 2009–2010 resulted in the formation of electronic/ambient pop duo Blue Hawaii. After a trip to South America, Standell-Preston and Cowan released their first EP, Blooming Summer, on Arbutus Records in 2010. They released their first album Untogether in 2013. The separation between the pair inspired the writing of Untogether, with Standell-Preston working with Braids and Cowan living in Berlin. The duo released a mixtape in late 2014, titled Agor Edits, featuring edits of old songs and a new song, "All of My Heart". The group reunited in 2016 in Los Angeles, and a single, "No One Like You", was released in 2017. That same year, Blue Hawaii released their second album, Tenderness.

Standell-Preston has described the project's difference from Braids, saying "Blue Hawaii is a bit more of an outlet for the urge in me to explore what it really is to be a performer and to have face paint and to bring all the artistic elements into the performance".

== Indiensoci ==
Self-described as "very feminine and ethereal", Standell-Preston released her first solo track, "Tickle Grass", on MySpace under the name Indiensoci in January 2009. She provided the live music for the opening of the Canadian Centre for Architecture exhibition "Speed Limits" on May 19, 2009. Standell-Preston released her second solo track, "Besnard", on YouTube in May 2010. The song was later released on the Flemish Eye mixtape Eye Spy.

== Solo ==
In 2014, Standell-Preston appeared on a re-recorded version of Jon Hopkins' "Form by Firelight", released on his Asleep Versions EP.

== Personal life ==
Standell-Preston grew up in Calgary, Canada. She later lived in Montreal in a shared house with Kerby and Braids members Tufts and Smith. She had a relationship with Tufts at school, before breaking up at age 17. Standell-Preston has suffered from "pretty crazy bouts of depression" since a young age.

== Discography ==
=== Albums ===
with Braids

- Native Speaker (2011)
- Flourish // Perish (2013)
- Deep in the Iris (2015)
- Shadow Offering (2020)
- Euphoric Recall (2023)

with Blue Hawaii

- Blooming Summer (2010)
- Untogether (2013)
- Tenderness (2017)
- Open Reduction Internal Fixation (2019)
- Diamond Shovel (2024)

=== EPs ===
with Braids

- Set Pieces as The Neighbourhood Council (2008)
- Live at CJSW (2008)
- In Kind/Amends (2013)

=== Compilation appearances ===
as Indiensoci

- "Besnard" on Eye Spy (2010)

=== Collaborations ===
- Conditions One – Max Cooper (EP, with Braids, 2012)
- Form by Firelight – Jon Hopkins (Asleep Versions EP, 2014)
