= 2015 Polaris Music Prize =

Annual Canadian music award ceremony

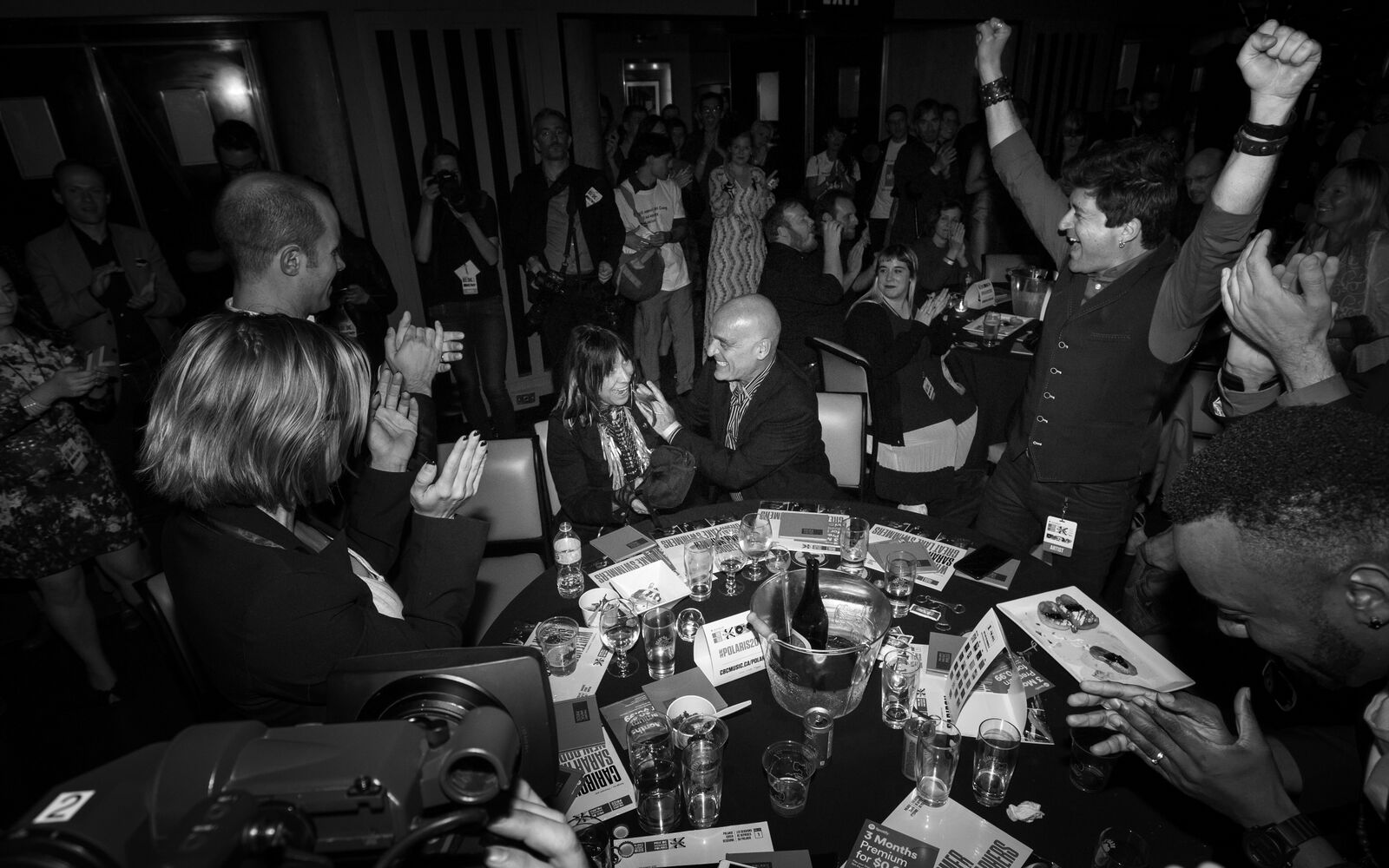
Buffy Sainte-Marie wins the 2015 Polaris Music Prize

The 2015 edition of the Canadian Polaris Music Prize was presented on September 21, 2015 at The Carlu event theatre in Toronto, Ontario. The event was hosted by children's entertainer Fred Penner.

In May 2015, Slaight Communications announced an additional contribution to the Polaris fund which saw the prize for the winning album increased to $50,000, as well as $3,000 to each of the non-winning nominees.

== Shortlist ==
The ten-album shortlist was announced on July 16.

- Buffy Sainte-Marie, Power in the Blood
- Alvvays, Alvvays
- BADBADNOTGOOD & Ghostface Killah, Sour Soul
- Braids, Deep in the Iris
- Caribou, Our Love
- Jennifer Castle, Pink City
- Drake, If You're Reading This It's Too Late
- Tobias Jesso Jr., Goon
- The New Pornographers, Brill Bruisers
- Viet Cong, Viet Cong

In March 2025, after the controversy around Sainte-Marie's long-claimed indigenous Canadian heritage, the Polaris committee revoked her award.

== Longlist ==
The prize's preliminary 40-album longlist was announced on June 16 at the Carleton Music Bar and Grill in Halifax, Nova Scotia.

- Absolutely Free, Absolutely Free
- The Acorn, Vieux Loup
- Lydia Ainsworth, Right From Real
- Alvvays, Alvvays
- Arkells, High Noon
- Rich Aucoin, Ephemeral
- BADBADNOTGOOD & Ghostface Killah, Sour Soul
- Bahamas, Bahamas Is Afie
- The Barr Brothers, Sleeping Operator
- Braids, Deep in the Iris
- Steph Cameron, Sad-Eyed Lonesome Lady
- Caribou, Our Love
- Jazz Cartier, Marauding in Paradise
- Jennifer Castle, Pink City
- Cold Specks, Neuroplasticity
- Louis-Jean Cormier, Les grandes artères
- Death from Above 1979, The Physical World
- Drake, If You're Reading This It's Too Late
- Frazey Ford, Indian Ocean
- Tobias Jesso Jr., Goon
- B. A. Johnston, Shit Sucks
- Pierre Kwenders, Le dernier empereur Bantou
- Lee Harvey Osmond, Beautiful Scars
- Jean Leloup, À Paradis City
- METZ, II
- Milk & Bone, Little Mourning
- Tre Mission, Stigmata
- The New Pornographers, Brill Bruisers
- Joel Plaskett, The Park Avenue Sobriety Test
- Buffy Sainte-Marie, Power in the Blood
- Elizabeth Shepherd, The Signal
- Siskiyou, Nervous
- Colin Stetson and Sarah Neufeld, Never Were the Way She Was
- Various Artists, Native North America (Vol. 1): Aboriginal Folk, Rock and Country, 1966-1985
- Viet Cong, Viet Cong
- Patrick Watson, Love Songs for Robots
- The Weather Station, Loyalty
- White Lung, Deep Fantasy
- Whitehorse, Leave No Bridge Unburned
- Young Guv, Ripe 4 Luv

== Heritage Prize ==
In 2015, the Polaris committee also launched the Heritage Prize, an awards program to honour classic Canadian albums released before the creation of the Polaris Prize. Each year four shortlists of albums from four historical periods in Canadian music will be released, following which a public online vote will choose which album to honour. These will be announced separately from the main Polaris Prize.

The winners for 2015 were announced on October 9. The four winning albums will be honoured with a tribute concert in Toronto in early 2016, a trophy and the sale of a limited edition commemorative print.

=== 1960s-1970s ===
- Joni Mitchell, Blue
- The Band, Music from Big Pink
- Robert Charlebois and Louise Forestier, Lindberg
- Leonard Cohen, Songs of Leonard Cohen
- Jackie Shane, Jackie Shane Live

=== 1980s ===
- Cowboy Junkies, The Trinity Session
- Glenn Gould, Bach: The Goldberg Variations
- Daniel Lanois, Acadie
- Maestro Fresh Wes, Symphony in Effect
- Mary Margaret O'Hara, Miss America
- Rush, Moving Pictures

=== 1990s ===
- Sloan, Twice Removed
- Blue Rodeo, Five Days in July
- Bran Van 3000, Glee
- Dream Warriors, And Now the Legacy Begins
- Lhasa de Sela, La llorona

=== 2000-2005 ===
- Peaches, The Teaches of Peaches
- Arcade Fire, Funeral
- Broken Social Scene, You Forgot It in People
- Constantines, Shine a Light
- Feist, Let It Die
