= Women (album) =

Studio album by Women
- Released: July 8, 2008
- Recorded: December 2007 – February 2008
- Genre: Indie rock
- Length: 29:30
- Labels: Flemish Eye; Jagjaguwar

Women chronology
Women (2008)	Public Strain (2010)

Women is the debut studio album by Calgary band Women, recorded by fellow Calgary-native Chad VanGaalen. It was released in 2008 on VanGaalen's Flemish Eye record label in Canada, and on Jagjaguwar in the US. The song "Sag Harbor Bridge" is a direct reference to the suicide of the artist Ray Johnson, like "Locust Valley" and "Venice Lockjaw" on Women's second album of 2010, Public Strain.

== Recording ==
Women was recorded by Polaris Music Prize-nominated Chad VanGaalen, in "[VanGaalen's] basement, an outdoor culvert and a crawlspace." It was recorded using boom boxes and tape machines, contributing to its lo-fi sound.

== Reception ==
Professional ratings
Review scores
Source	Rating
AllMusic	3.5/5 stars
Austin Chronicle	3/5 stars
Now	3/5 stars
Pitchfork	(7.9/10)
PopMatters	7/10

Women was released to favourable reviews, with Cokemachineglow naming it as "the best 'indie rock' record released [in 2008], hands down."

== Track listing ==
No.	Title	Length
1.	"Cameras"	1:01
2.	"Lawncare"	4:27
3.	"Woodbine"	3:39
4.	"Black Rice"	3:15
5.	"Sag Harbor Bridge"	1:40
6.	"Group Transport Hall"	1:11
7.	"Shaking Hand"	4:44
8.	"Upstairs"	3:58
9.	"January 8th"	1:58
10.	"Flashlights"	3:43
Total length:		29:36
