= Deep in the Iris =

Studio album by Braids
- Released: 27 April 2015 (Europe) 28 April 2015 (North America)
- Recorded: Arizona, New York, Vermont, 2014
- Genres: Electronic, art rock, dream pop, indietronica
- Length: 41:23
- Labels: Arbutus Records, Flemish Eye
- Producers: Braids, Damian Taylor

Braids chronology
Flourish // Perish (2013)	Deep in the Iris (2015)	Shadow Offering (2020)

Singles from Deep in the Iris
- 1. "Miniskirt" Released: 10 February 2015

Deep in the Iris is the third studio album by Canadian experimental pop/art rock band Braids. It was released by Arbutus Records worldwide, excluding Canada where it was released by Flemish Eye, on 28 April 2015. It has been described as the band's "sunniest and most immediate record".

== Background ==
=== Writing and recording ===
Braids began writing Deep in the Iris in tandem with their second album Flourish // Perish, performing unreleased new songs live in 2012 and 2013, with "Blondie" being the earliest-surviving song to be included on the album. Writing and recording officially began in March 2014 for seven weeks in a cabin in woods near Prescott, Arizona, marking the first time the band had worked on an album outside Canada. After recording Flourish // Perish in their windowless garage in Montreal, Arizona was chosen because the band "wanted to leave winter, to leave what we were familiar with, to go to a place where we felt sunlight on our face". Taylor Smith revealed that the band focused on the process of songwriting, rather than the expectation which comes with recording an album, explaining, "the expectation was to have a beautiful experience together and if a record comes out of that beautiful experience, great!". In the first few weeks in Arizona, the band "just went on walks, had talks, roasted marshmallows and chopped firewood and went grocery shopping and cooked meals" in an effort to reconnect after touring Flourish // Perish. The band interrupted the writing process to tour across the United States with Wye Oak for three weeks in May 2014, debuting new songs "Taste" and "Letting Go".

The band cut back on the electronic elements which featured on Flourish // Perish and instead refocused on using live instruments, as on their debut album Native Speaker. "Really cool, interesting-sounding pianos" were utilised. Further sessions followed in Delhi, New York and Putney, Vermont in June and July 2014. The "space and beauty" of the retreat in New York, coupled with the energy provided by the presence of the band's friends from Montreal and New York City, helped evolve "Happy When" and "Miniskirt", the latter being the final song written for the album. The album was tracked in Vermont in a turn-of-the-century house, specifically chosen because it contained a Steinway piano. Three additional songs were recorded, but were left off the album. "Sweet World" (played live regularly in 2013 and 2014) was considered for the album, but "just didn’t fit with the whole vision of it".

Mixing began with Damian Taylor at Golden Ratio Studios in Montreal in late September 2014, with the sessions concluding in December. With the band having done some preliminary mixing, Taylor's main contribution was to make Raphaelle Standell-Preston's vocals more prominent in the mix. The album's title and track list were announced on February 10, 2015, with opening single "Miniskirt" made available for streaming on the same day. Second song "Taste" was shared on SoundCloud on 4 March. The album was released by Arbutus Records and Flemish Eye in Europe on 27 April 2015 and the following day in North America.

=== Musical style and influences ===
Prior to the beginning of recording, drummer Austin Tufts revealed he had been listening to performed music (as opposed to programmed), such as Little Dragon, Disclosure, Portico, Bonobo, Radiohead, R&B and soul. Joni Mitchell, Sarah McLachlan and Alanis Morissette influenced Standell-Preston vocally.

=== Themes ===
A press release described "pornography, abuse and slutshaming" as themes evident in Standell-Preston's lyrics. "Miniskirt" deals with her "as a woman at this point in my life; getting older and discussing what I do experience as a woman and what I’ve gone through". The song is also about "standing up for gender equality and in particular, for women’s rights".

=== Artwork ===
Tufts took the album's cover photograph in Vermont, a view through a culvert looking down into a creek.

== Critical reception ==
Professional ratings
Review scores
Source	Rating
AllMusic	4/5 stars
Consequence of Sound	B+
DIY	3/5 stars
Drowned in Sound	9/10 stars
Exclaim!	8/10 stars
The Irish Times	3/5 stars
Now	3/5 stars
Paste	8.7/10 stars
Pitchfork	(7.4/10)
PopMatters	8/10 stars
Rolling Stone	3.5/5 stars
Sputnikmusic	3.8/5 stars
Tiny Mix Tapes	3/5 stars
Under the Radar	6/10 stars

Upon its release, the album received mostly positive reviews from music critics. Aggregating website AnyDecentMusic? reported a score of 7.3 based on 19 professional reviews, while Metacritic reported 78 based on 18 professional reviews.

The album was a shortlisted nominee for the 2015 Polaris Music Prize.

== Track listing ==
No.	Title	Length
1.	"Letting Go"	4:21
2.	"Taste"	5:00
3.	"Blondie"	4:25
4.	"Happy When"	5:39
5.	"Miniskirt"	4:54
6.	"Getting Tired"	3:31
7.	"Sore Eyes"	3:52
8.	"Bunny Rose"	5:18
9.	"Warm Like Summer"	4:23
Total length:		41:23

== Personnel ==
- Raphaelle Standell-Preston – guitar, piano, lead vocals
- Austin Tufts – drums, vocals
- Taylor Smith – bass, guitar, piano, vocals
- Damian Taylor – mixing
- Chris Allgood – assistant
- Emily Lazar – mastering
- Marc Rimmer – design
