= Set piece (disambiguation) =

A set piece is an elaborate sequence in a film which sees a chase, fight, or other action taking place in an original and memorable way.

Set piece may also refer to:

- Set piece (football), when a dead ball re-enters open play in association football and rugby football, such as at a free kick, corner kick or lineout
- Set Piece (novel), a novel based on the science fiction television series Doctor Who
- A piece of theatrical scenery
- A fixed piece of music used in musical performance competitions

== See also ==
- Set Pieces, an album by the indie band Braids
- Set Piece Menu, a British podcast about association football
