= Preoccupations (album) =

Studio album by Preoccupations
- Released: September 16, 2016
- Recorded: 2016
- Studios: The Barn Window Studio; Lost Cause Studios; The Area; Monty's Place; Basketball 4 Life; Breakglass Studios
- Genres: Post-punk; art punk; noise rock; dark wave
- Length: 38:16
- Labels: Flemish Eye; Jagjaguwar
- Producers: Matt Flegel; Scott Munro; Graham Walsh

Preoccupations chronology
Viet Cong (2015)	Preoccupations (2016)	New Material (2018)

Singles from Preoccupations
- 1. "Anxiety" Released: June 13, 2016; 2. "Degraded" Released: July 13, 2016; 3. "Memory" Released: September 7, 2016

Preoccupations is the second studio album by Canadian rock band Preoccupations, released on September 16, 2016, by Flemish Eye in Canada and Jagjaguwar in the United States. It was the band's first album released under this name, after changing it from "Viet Cong" in 2015.

Influences on the album included Orchestral Manoeuvres in the Dark and New Order.

== Release ==
The album was preceded by the singles "Anxiety", "Degraded" and "Memory".

== Critical reception ==
Professional ratings
Aggregate scores
Source	Rating
AnyDecentMusic?	7.4/10
Metacritic	79/100
Review scores
Source	Rating
AllMusic	4/5 stars
Consequence of Sound	B
DIY	4/5 stars
Exclaim!	7/10
The Irish Times	3/5 stars
Pitchfork	7.9/10
PopMatters	8/10
Q	3/5 stars
The Skinny	4/5 stars
Uncut	8/10

Preoccupations received favorable reviews from contemporary music critics. At Metacritic, which assigns a normalized rating out of 100 to reviews from mainstream critics, the album received an average score of 79, based on 21 reviews, which indicates "generally favorable reviews". Writing for Pitchfork, Marc Masters stated, "What makes Preoccupations much more than a circular exercise in self-analysis is the vitality of the music. There’s a tense, nervous energy running through all the tracks, which connect to each other like wires that spark electrical currents when they meet".

== Track listing ==
All tracks are written by Preoccupations.

No.	Title	Length
1.	"Anxiety"	4:29
2.	"Monotony"	2:53
3.	"Zodiac"	3:43
4.	"Memory"	11:26
5.	"Degraded"	4:00
6.	"Sense"	1:01
7.	"Forbidden"	1:32
8.	"Stimulation"	4:41
9.	"Fever"	4:31
Total length:		38:16

== Personnel ==
Credits adapted from the liner notes of Preoccupations.

Main personnel

- Matt Flegel – performer, writer
- Mike Wallace – performer, writer
- Scott Munro – performer, writer
- Daniel Christiansen – performer, writer
- Julie Fader – vocals (1, 4)
- Dan Boeckner – vocals (4)
- Jessie Stein – vocals (4), drone (4)
- Graham Walsh – keyboards (7, 9)

Additional personnel

- Graham Walsh – production, mixing, recording
- Matt Flegel – production
- Scott Munro – production, recording
- Paul Gold – mastering
- Pat Flegel – artwork
- Marc Rimmer – design

== Charts ==
Chart (2016)	Peak position
Belgian Albums (Ultratop Flanders)	105
