= Braids (band) =

Canadian art rock band

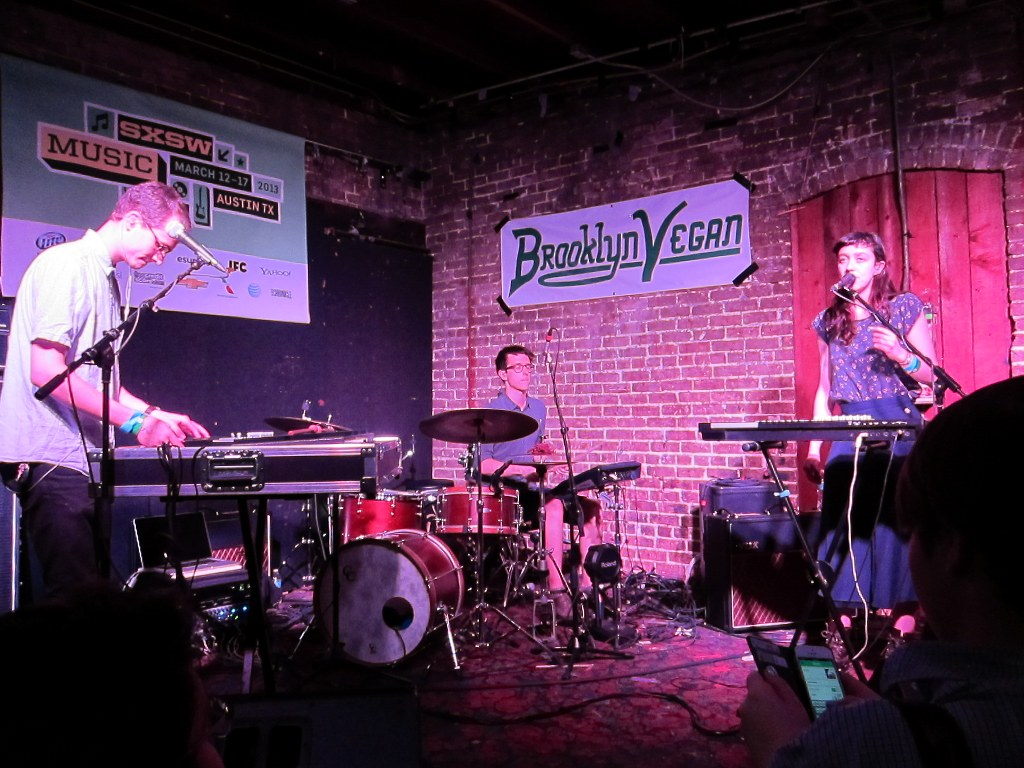
- Braids performing at SXSW in 2013

Background information
- Origin: Calgary, Alberta, Canada
- Genres: Indie rock, art rock, experimental rock, shoegaze, post-rock
- Years active: 2006–present
- Labels: Flemish Eye (Canada); Kanine (United States); Full Time Hobby (UK); Arbutus Records (Canada)
- Members: Raphaelle Standell-Preston; Austin Tufts; Taylor Smith
- Past members: Katie Lee; Vince Man
- Website: braidsmusic.com

Braids (formerly stylized as BRAIDS) is a Canadian art rock band originating from Calgary, Alberta and based in Montréal, Québec for most of their career. Braids currently consists of Raphaelle Standell-Preston, Austin Tufts and Taylor Smith. The band (along with former members Katie Lee and Vince Man) met at a young age and began collaborating in high school. Their debut album, Native Speaker, was released on January 18, 2011, in Canada and the United States to generally positive reviews. The album was shortlisted for the 2011 Polaris Music Prize. The band's second album, Flourish // Perish, was released on August 20, 2013. Their third, Deep in the Iris, was released on April 28, 2015, and was awarded the 2015 Juno Award for Alternative Album of the Year.

== History ==
=== 2006–2008: Formation and Set Pieces ===
Braids grew out of friendships in Calgary, where the band members were students at Western Canada High School. Standell-Preston recounted that it was a conversation over a blueberry muffin in the school's cafeteria that prompted the group's formation, under the name The Neighbourhood Council. Rehearsing in Smith's parents' garage, the band had early success backing lead vocalist Standell-Preston in a songwriting contest hosted by the Calgary Folk Music Festival. This led to an invitation to play at the inaugural Sled Island Music Festival in 2007. Following their performance at Sled Island, the band continued to collaborate and opted to postpone attending university to play music.

After a year of intensive rehearsal and the departure of Man, the band recorded their first EP, Set Pieces, at CJSW in April 2008. Following the EP's release in July 2008, the band returned to Sled Island to play an opening set for Deerhunter. Their performance was highly regarded by the audience, who gave the group a standing ovation after Deerhunter's Bradford Cox rose from his seat at the end of the group's set and requested that the band play an encore. This performance at Sled Island and the Set Pieces EP garnered more extensive attention for the band, including a notable mention from the music blog Stereogum.

=== 2008–2011: Relocation and Native Speaker ===
In September 2008, the band relocated to Montreal, where Lee, Smith and Tufts attended classes at McGill University. In Montreal, the band rehearsed new material for an album and changed their name from The Neighbourhood Council to Braids (the EP was reissued under the Braids name). Tufts branded the original name as "pretty terrible" and felt the change reflected the band's "interwoven and interlaced" style. The band continued to develop material and their particular sound. Work from this period was debuted on a series of short tours, including a brief reunion with Deerhunter. With the structure of the group's music largely established, the band began to record and self-produce their debut album, Native Speaker, in July 2009. With only the drum tracks laid out for the album, the band embarked on their first major tour across Canada a month later.

Work resumed on Native Speaker when the group returned to Montreal in September 2009. The band completed recording the album during the winter of 2010. During this period, Braids was invited to play a set at Pop Montreal. Later in 2010, Braids toured in support of Holly Miranda in Canada and the United States. After negotiating with labels in the United States and Canada, Braids announced Chad VanGaalen's label Flemish Eye would distribute Native Speaker in Canada and Kanine Records would release the album in the United States, with the release date set for January 18, 2011.

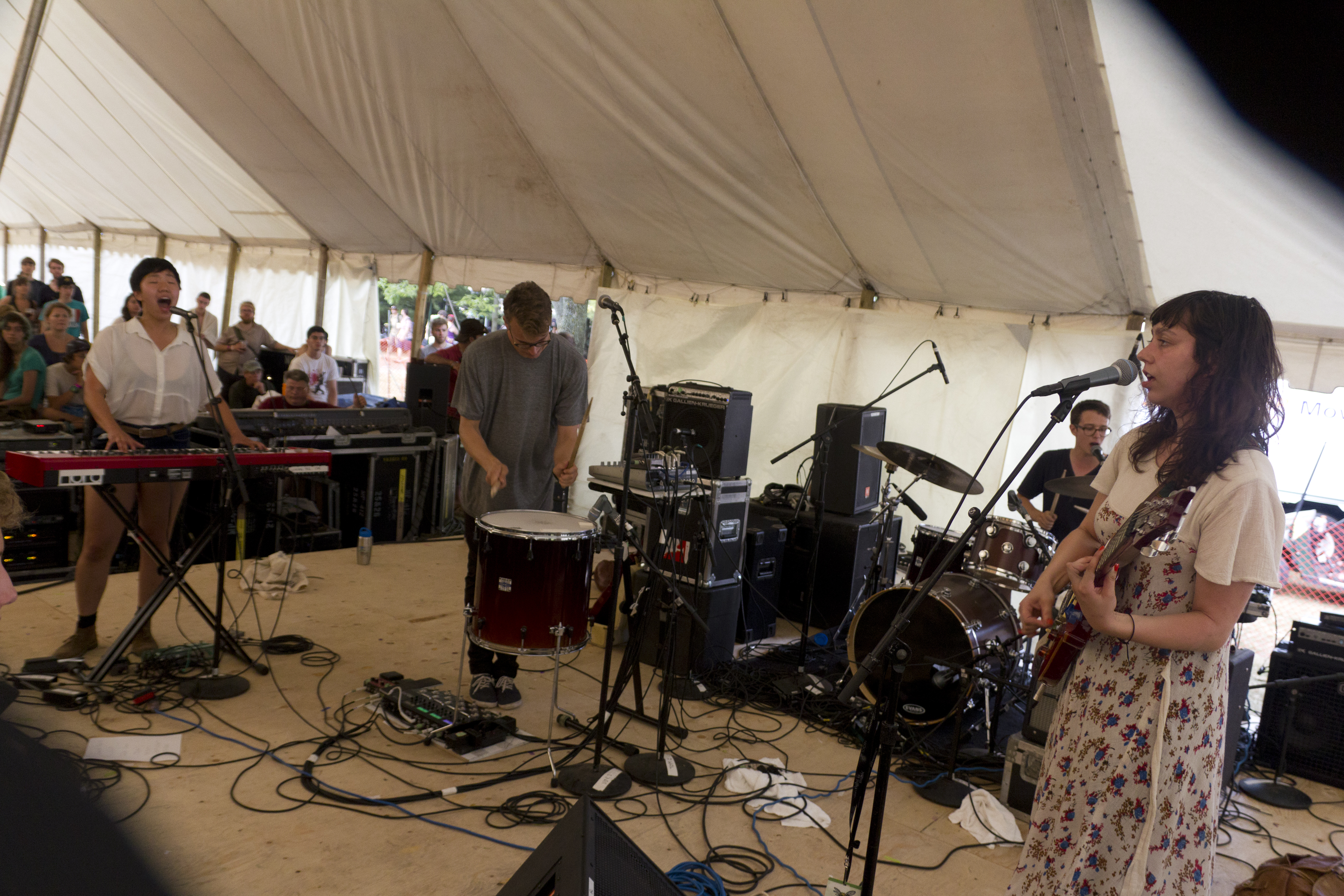
Braids performing at the 2011 Hillside Festival

Native Speaker has received mostly positive reviews from critics, with the group's percussive sound likened to Feels-era Animal Collective and praised for its innovative melodies and Standell-Preston's "dynamic" vocals. Robert Everett-Green of The Globe and Mail gave the album 4 out of 5 stars, declaring that he could not stop listening to the record and comparing the importance of the group's debut to early Broken Social Scene and Arcade Fire. The group also garnered positive reviews from Jon Pareles of The New York Times who said that the music is as "mesmerizing and vertiginous as desire can be", while Paul Lester remarked in The Guardian that the band's "experimental dream pop delivered through a shoegaze haze" warrants comparisons to "very important bands". Reviews from Spin, Rolling Stone and Pitchfork were also positive, with the publications rating the record 8 out of 10, 7.9 out of 10 and 3.5 out of 5 stars, respectively. Loud and Quiet described the album as a "sonically multi-layered and lyrically unabashed treatment of hazy, tumultuous youth".

On June 16, the album was named as a longlisted nominee (one of 40) for the 2011 Polaris Music Prize. On July 6, the album was named as a shortlisted (one of 10) nominee for the 2011 award. The Polaris Music Prize is an award presented on an annual basis to the creators of a full-length Canadian album, based solely on artistic merit without regard to genre or records sales. The album was nominated in two categories during the 2012 Juno Awards.

The band toured extensively in 2011 in support of Native Speaker, headlining their own shows in Canada, the United States and Europe, in addition to supporting acts including Baths, Asobi Seksu, Toro y Moi, The Antlers, Wild Beasts, Girls and label mates Pepper Rabbit.

=== 2012–2013: Flourish // Perish ===
The band spent much of 2012 recording their second album in Montreal. Keyboardist Lee departed the band at an unspecified point during the year, after four months of trying to work on the album together, and the band later moved forward as a three-piece. Braids discussed the direction of their second album in May, hinting it would be electronic-based. The band embarked on their first tour as a trio in September, culminating in appearances at ATP I'll Be Your Mirror and CMJ in New York City. Braids released their first new music since Native Speaker in December 2012, collaborating with Max Cooper on the Conditions One EP. Mixing for the album was completed in January 2013, with the mastering handled by Harris Newman at Grey Market Mastering in February. The band went on their first tour of 2013 in March, playing across the Southern United States and finishing with a run of shows at South by Southwest.

On May 28, 2013, the band announced the album's title, Flourish // Perish, and a release date of August 20. The album was preceded by the In Kind // Amends EP and was followed by the "Fruend" single. Braids kicked off their Flourish // Perish tour with a round of European festival and club dates over the summer (including appearances at End of the Road and Electric Picnic) and followed with an eight-date Canadian tour in September. Braids embarked on a month-long North American tour with Hundred Waters in October and returned to Europe for the final leg of the tour in November and December 2013. The band encountered problems playing the album's tracks live, noting, "It was written on the computer, rather than through playing. Some of them just wouldn't fly live – we couldn't sculpt the energy properly". Braids released a video for album outtake "Deep Running" on YouTube in April 2014.

=== 2012–present: Deep in the Iris and Companion ===
Not wishing to rest creatively, the band began work on their third album in 2012 (in tandem with Flourish // Perish) and debuted a number of new songs live in September and October 2012. The band continued to play new songs on their Flourish // Perish tour in 2013. On January 13, 2014, the band tweeted that they were considering recording their third album in the desert and the trio subsequently headed to Arizona for a recording session in late March. In May, the band took a break from recording to undertake a North American tour in support of Wye Oak. Braids reconvened for a second recording session in a farmhouse near Delhi, New York in early June, wrapping on July 1. The band decamped to rural Vermont for the final recording sessions in late July. Mixing began in late September with Damian Taylor at Golden Ratio Studios in Montreal and headed into the final stages two months later. On February 10, 2015, Braids announced the album title as Deep in the Iris, with a release date of April 28, 2015. After the release of the album, the band toured for the remainder of the year across North America, Europe and for the first time Asia, visiting Taiwan, Japan, China, Macau, Hong Kong, Vietnam, Thailand and Singapore.

On April 26, 2016, Braids announced the May 20 release of Companion, an EP of four songs left unfinished during the writing process for Deep in the Iris and reworked during a recording session in Montreal in August 2015. A North American and European tour was also announced, running from May to July 2016.

On April 28, 2023, Braids released their latest album, Euphoric Recall. A North American and European tour, which featured string ensemble accompaniment, began on May 27 in Los Angeles.

== Discography ==
=== Studio albums ===
- 2011: Native Speaker (Flemish Eye/Kanine Records)
- 2013: Flourish // Perish (Arbutus Records/Full Time Hobby/Flemish Eye)
- 2015: Deep in the Iris (Arbutus Records/Flemish Eye)
- 2020: Shadow Offering (Braids Musique Inc./Secret City Records Inc.)
- 2023: Euphoric Recall (Braids Musique Inc./Secret City Records Inc.)

=== Singles ===
- 2011: "Lemonade" (Flemish Eye/Kanine Records)
- 2011: "Plath Heart" (Flemish Eye/Kanine Records)
- 2011: "Peach Wedding" (Flemish Eye/Kanine Records)
- 2013: "Fruend" (Arbutus Records/Full Time Hobby/Flemish Eye)
- 2015: "Miniskirt" (Arbutus Records/Full Time Hobby/Flemish Eye)
- 2018: "Collarbones / Burdock & Dandelion" (Braids Musique Inc.)
- 2019: "Eclipse (Ashley)" (Braids Musique Inc./Secret City Records Inc.)
- 2020: "Young Buck" (Braids Musique Inc./Secret City Records Inc.)
- 2020: "Snow Angel" (Braids Musique Inc./Secret City Records Inc.)

=== EPs ===
- 2008: Set Pieces as The Neighbourhood Council
- 2008: Live at CJSW
- 2012: Conditions 1 with Max Cooper (Fields)
- 2013: In Kind/Amends (Arbutus Records/Full Time Hobby/Flemish Eye)
- 2016: Companion (Arbutus Records/Full Time Hobby/Flemish Eye)

=== Split singles ===
- 2010: Split 7" with Blue Hawaii (Arbutus Records)
- 2011: Split 7" with Hey Rosetta!
- 2011: Split 7" with Purity Ring (Fat Possum Records)

=== Other ===
- 2014: "Deep Running" (released for free via YouTube)

=== Videos ===
Year	Video	Director
2011	"Plath Heart"	Blair Neal
2013	"In Kind"	Angus Borsos
2015	"Miniskirt"	Kevan Funk
2015	"Taste"	Kevan Funk
2016	"Bunny Rose"	Stephen McNally
2016	"Joni"	Maria Ines Manchego
2019	"Eclipse (Ashley)"	Nina Vroemen
2020	"Young Buck"	Kevin Calero
2020	"Snow Angel"	Kevan Funk

== Band members ==
Current

- Raphaelle Standell-Preston (guitar, keyboards, lead vocals) (2006–present)
- Austin Tufts (drums, vocals) (2006–present)
- Taylor Smith (bass, guitar, percussion, malletkat, vocals) (2006–present)

Former

- Vince Man (guitar) (2006–2007)
- Katie Lee (keyboards, vocals) (2006–2012)
