= Public Strain =

Studio album by Women
- Released: August 23, 2010 (Note: According to multiple reviews, the album was released on September 28, 2010. Women's Bandcamp page lists the release date as August 24, 2010; musicOMH states that the date for the United Kingdom was August 23, 2010.)
- Studio: Yoko Eno
- Genres: Post-punk; indie rock; art rock; noise rock
- Length: 42:18
- Labels: Flemish Eye; Jagjaguwar
- Producer: Chad VanGaalen

Women chronology
Women (2008)	Public Strain (2010)

Singles from Public Strain
- 1. "Eyesore" Released: September 2010

Public Strain is the second and final studio album by Canadian rock band Women. It was released on August 23, 2010, via Flemish Eye in Canada and Jagjaguwar in the United States. The album was produced by Chad VanGaalen and recorded during a period of isolation for the band with limited equipment and experimental techniques involved in the 10-month recording process. (Note: According to a retrospective interview with Flegel in 2020, the recording process was about 10 months; in an earlier 2010 interview with Anthony Fantano, he says it was about 8 months. VanGaalen says that it was "9 months of us hanging out".) It has been noted for the key and vocal delivery, unique sound and krautrock style, influence from the Velvet Underground, and numerous genres including post-punk.

Lyrically cryptic, Public Strain addresses issues such as paranoia and melancholy. It contains multiple references to Ray Johnson. The deadpan vocal delivery of guitarist Patrick Flegel and bassist Matthew Flegel were described as evocative and hard to understand; the album makes use of harmonizing from all three band members and VanGaalen to create an "ethereal" vocal track. Its instrumentation is abrasive, which drew comparisons to Sonic Youth and Wavves. An accompanying tour came to an abrupt halt with an onstage fight.

Public Strain was released to high critical reviews, and it was longlisted for the 2011 Polaris Music Prize. Retrospective reviews have labeled it one of the best albums of the 2010s decade, with particular praise directed towards the closing track "Eyesore". Widely considered an underground classic, the album has received a cult following. Its large impact on indie artists has been noted by personnel involved in the recording and release of the album.

== Background and recording ==
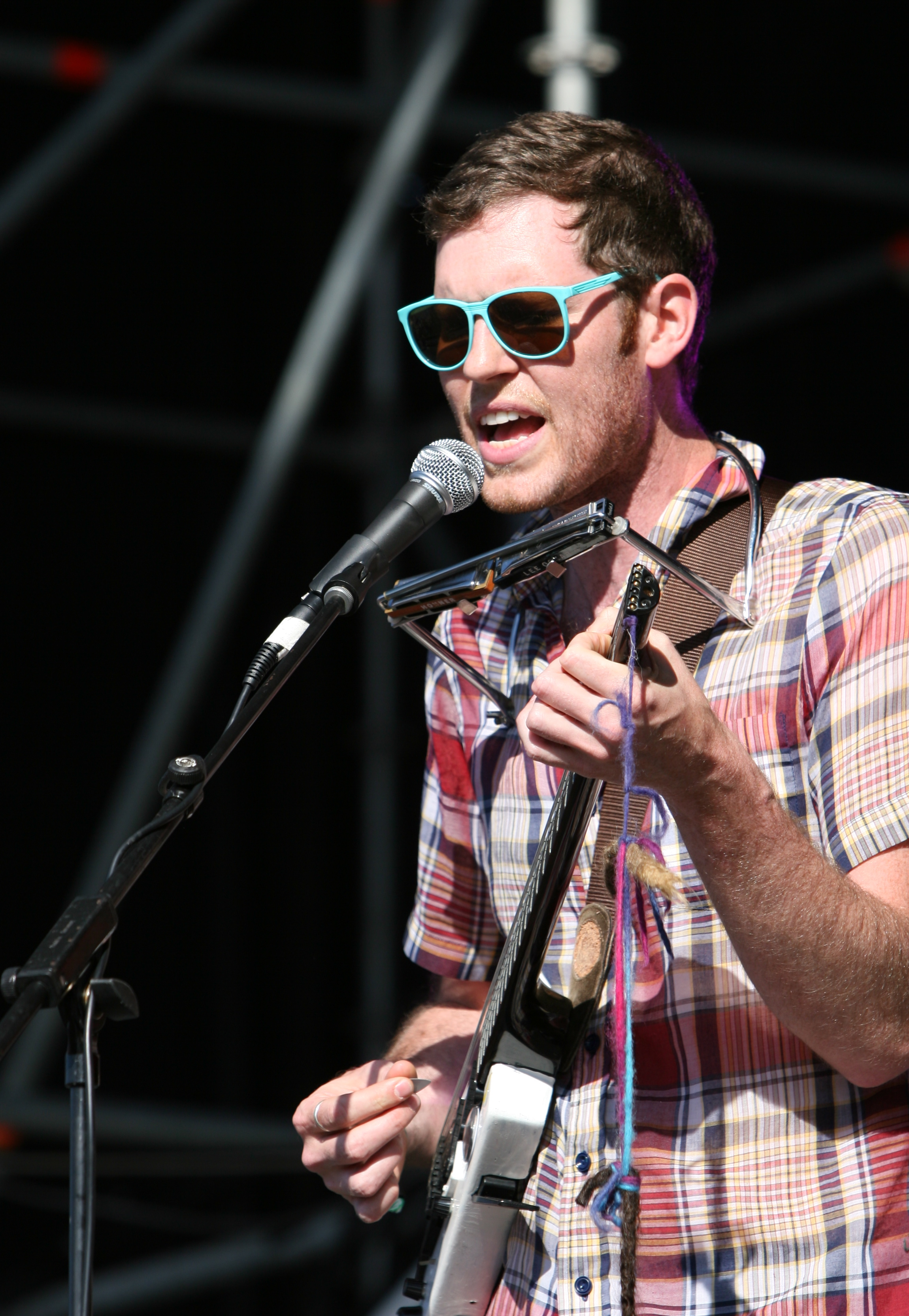
Chad VanGaalen contributed to the album's abrasive sound and was a friend of the band.

After promoting their debut album Women in 2008, the band felt the pressures of extensive touring and began recording Public Strain soon after finishing their tour— the members lived in a house together with a place in their basement that was used to jam for hours at a time. The album was produced by Chad VanGaalen, who also worked on Women's first album. It was the first to be recorded in VanGaalen's new studio space called Yoko Eno. Patrick Flegel, a guitarist and front man of the band, would describe the recording process as a "slog", but with similar or the same experimentation techniques as Women. Flegel would create a sloppy demo of a track and slowly piece it together with VanGaalen, relatives of VanGaalen, and the band members, a process which he described as "debaucherous". Drummer Michael Wallace was not particularly involved in the songwriting process but acknowledged Women's influence from the Velvet Underground, especially Moe Tucker. Wallace was also influenced by his knowledge gained in India before joining Women.

The guitar track for "Penal Colony" was originally not going to be used, but the band decided to keep the recording; Public Strain varies with production strategies that were made on the fly and meticulously produced recordings. The drum track for "China Steps" was initially recorded in a "cavernous, concrete basement" in VanGaalen's garage, and the song concludes with more closely recorded drums. Nonetheless, Flegel would later state that the band members did "lie through their teeth" in contemporary interviews; most of Public Strain was recorded outside, including Flegel's vocals, mainly because VanGaalen desired to leave the studio.

I like listening to music that sounds sort of fearless, like they're not afraid of fucking up, or not particularly worried about how people think ...

— Patrick Flegel interview with Anthony Fantano, 2010

Most of the album was recorded to tape and without professional equipment, creating more of a raw and abrasive sound. The final product was considered by Flegel to have "missed the mark" of Women's intended sound, although it got closer than their debut album to their intentions. Flegel was working a graveyard shift full time, leading to a period of isolation, which contributed to the songwriting process: "that's what contextualizes the album in my mind, this bizarre complex in the suburbs, no people around—just, completely quiet, just left alone to your thoughts, too much time on your hands, thinking too much, blowing things out of proportion, growing incredibly paranoid". The band members would drink alcohol and soda during the recording process. Wallace would later state that the recording process was difficult and stressful.

The recording process took about 10 months; the title of the album reflected the isolation of the band. Flegel credits Ian Russel, the founder of Flemish Eye, VanGaalen's label, as a motivator for creating Public Strain. VanGaalen considers the sound of the album to be hard to replicate in the face of other artists' requests: "They're expecting a record to sound a certain way ... they'll be like, oh, man, like the Women record, but then they don't realize how that was, like, nine months of us hanging out, you know, and just like playing Nintendo and like not worrying about stuff." VanGaalen praised the songwriting abilities of the band and bassist Matt Flegel. During the recording process, VanGaalen would discard takes that sounded too clean and replace them with the more abrasive cassette tape tracks.

== Music and lyrics ==
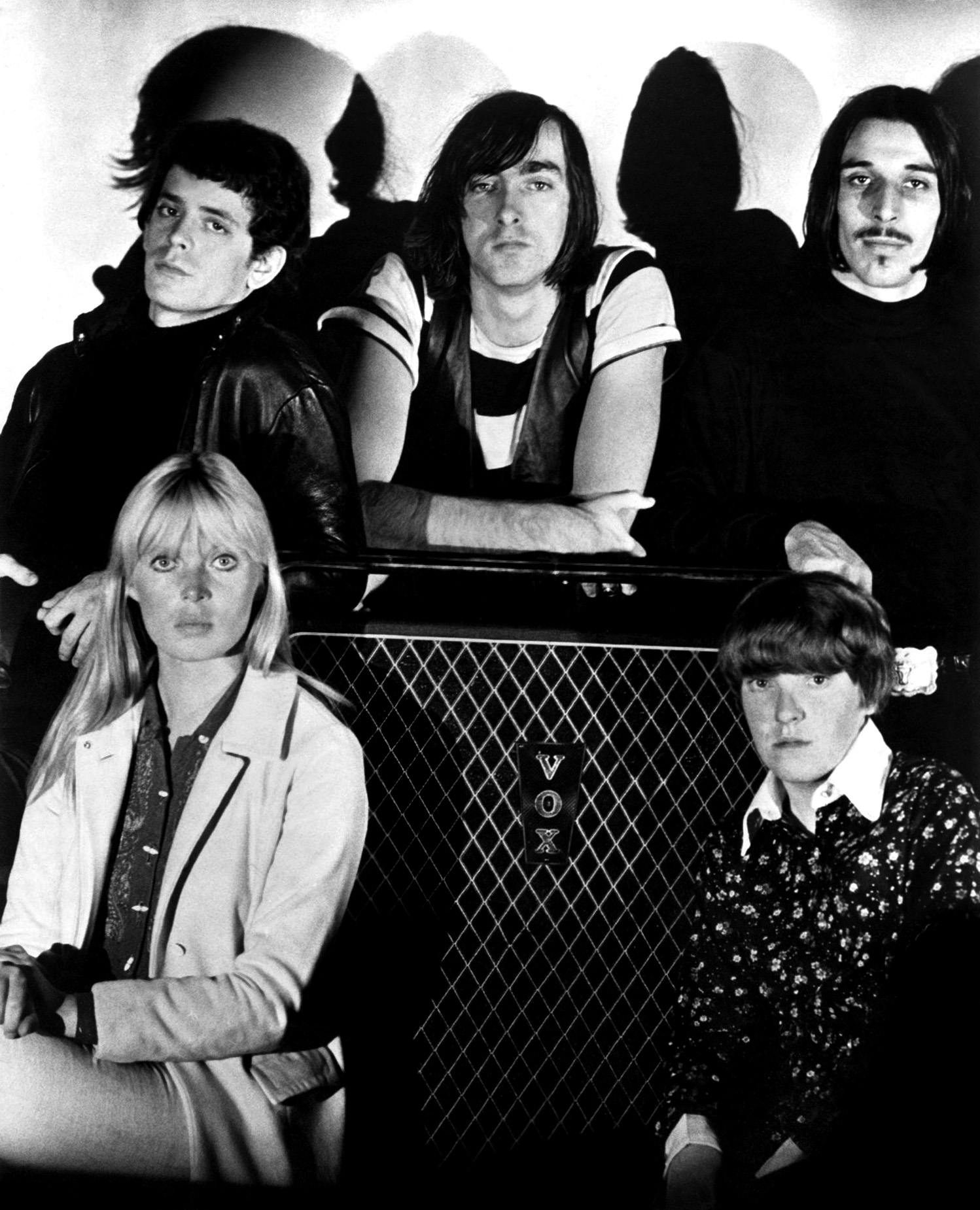
The Velvet Underground served as a major influence on the album's sound

Public Strain has been described as post-punk, art rock, indie rock, and noise rock. The album contains a deadpan vocal delivery and showcases more pop influences than Women. It begins with "Can't You See", an "expansive opening track" that changes key from A major to E major, with optimistic lyrics. The sound of the opening track was compared to Wavves, an American rock band. "Heat Distraction" contains uncommon key and time signature changes; the song begins in 13/8, and was compared to works by Sonic Youth and Swell Maps. "Narrow With The Hall" was noted for its minimal use of chords, "eerie" vocals, use of feedback, and its vintage 1960s sound. "Penal Colony" is a subdued ballad, which drew comparisons to Public Strain's tenth track "Venice Lockjaw" for its paring back; the latter is noted for its "angelic melody and twinkling arpeggios" and was called "the Velvet Underground [but] raised up from graves to woo the stars". "Bells", an "integral" track, follows "Penal Colony" and is densely built with reverberating bass.

The second half of the album is more abrasive than the first, opening with "China Steps". Its motorik beat and associated krautrock style drive listeners "toward a crescendo that never comes". "Drag Open" has been considered to be one of the loudest tracks on Public Strain, drawing comparisons to Thurston Moore of Sonic Youth. "Locust Valley" is one of the more melodic and intelligible songs on the album. The final track "Eyesore" lacks a chorus and is complete with "expansive guitar lines structured around ringing open strings and wide melodic intervals". "Eyesore" was the first and only single off of Public Strain; the track is one of Women's best known songs and is one of their most cherished. "Narrow With The Hall" and "Eyesore" were named "Best New Track" by Martin Douglas and Larry Fitzmaurice of Pitchfork, respectively.

Thematically, the album deals with topics such as unease, paranoia, melancholy, resignation, and euphoria. Public Strain was noted for evocative, hard to understand vocals and abstract lyrics, and its harmony-heavy vocal delivery between Patrick and Matt Flegel, which has been described as "ethereal". The lyrics were described to relate to the album cover of a blizzard, in conjunction with the album's monotonous production. The cover art was chosen by Christopher Reimer, another guitarist for Women. Two songs are direct references to late artist Ray Johnson: "Locust Valley" is the name of the town where Johnson lived, while "Venice Lockjaw" is a phrase Johnson used in pins that he handed out at the 1990 Venice Biennale. Johnson was previously referenced on Women's debut album, on the song titled "Sag Harbour Bridge".

== Release ==
Public Strain was released on August 23, 2010, on VanGaalen's Flemish Eye record label in Canada, and on Jagjaguwar in the United States. "Eyesore" was released in September as a single in the US. Preceding the release, Women announced an international three-month fall tour. The European leg of the tour was successful for the band, but the North American tour was brutal; the tour would eventually be cut short due to an on-stage fight on October 29, 2010. Exclaim! magazine would run a detailed account of the fight, and Flemish Eye stated that Women was "exhausted and going on hiatus." The band would ultimately disband in October 2010 after cancelling all remaining shows of the tour.

== Reception ==
Professional ratings
Aggregate scores
Source	Rating
AnyDecentMusic?	7.8/10
Metacritic	81/100
Review scores
Source	Rating
AllMusic	4/5 stars
The Boston Phoenix	3.5/4 stars
Drowned in Sound	8/10
Mojo	4/5 stars
NME	8/10
Pitchfork	8.0/10
PopMatters	9/10
The Skinny	4/5 stars
Spin	8/10
Uncut	4/5 stars

Public Strain was released to widespread critical acclaim. At Metacritic, which assigns a normalized rating out of 100 to reviews from professional publications, the album received an average score of 81, based on 20 reviews. Aggregator AnyDecentMusic? gave Public Strain 7.8 out of 10, based on their assessment of the critical consensus.

Aaron Leitko, writing for Pitchfork, called the album "a bleak but beautiful record, full of subtly skewed melodies". Andrzej Lukowski wrote a review for Drowned in Sound based on the concluding song "Eyesore", and ultimately concluded that the final song and the album "sounds like the start of something greater for a band touched with greatness from the off". Chris Buckle, for The Skinny, called it "one of the year's most rewarding listens"; Joshua Kloke, at PopMatters, commented that in the wake of the band's potential breakup, "things have to leave you before you really begin to appreciate them".

In a critical review, Chris Coplan for No Ripcord stated that, in the placement of Women among a number of bands that similarly draw influences from groups like the Velvet Underground, "do [Women] add anything? Are they truly that talented? The answer to those questions, and whether this album should be bought and consumed, is an unbelievably resounding no."

Exclaim! placed Public Strain at number 10 on its list of the best Pop & Rock Albums of 2010, with critic Brock Thiessen writing that "Public Strain showed that rock'n'roll can still offer shock and awe". Pitchfork placed the album at number 47 on its list of The Top 50 Albums of 2010; similarly, Ron Webb of BBC called Public Strain "one of 2010's finest LPs". The album was named as a longlisted nominee for the 2011 Polaris Music Prize.

=== Legacy and influence ===
Public Strain has received lasting critical acclaim, with critics considering the album to be one of the best of the 2010s decade. It is widely considered to be an underground classic. Sputnikmusic's staff ranked Public Strain the third best album of the decade, calling it "a remarkably ageless album, existing out of time or of capital m Movement, existing in its own category". Gorilla vs. Bear and Tiny Mix Tapes ranked the album the 31st and 77th best album of the decade, respectively. Exclaim! named it one of the 50 best Canadian albums of the decade. "Eyesore" in particular was described as a masterpiece and a "floating opus which could very well be their swan song" by Kloke.

Retrospective assessments have discussed the album's influence on indie artists. Michael Crick at PopMatters concluded that while it was unlikely that it had a wide influence, Public Strain still modeled and contributed to the "Calgary Sound" of music. Tim Sentz of Beats per Minute called Public Strain a cult classic in 2020, labeling "Eyesore" an epic finale, and wrote: "Just like the band who influenced them the most – the Velvet Underground]– it’s likely every aspiring musician who bought Public Strain and adored it, went out and started their own band". Indie artists have also commented on the album. Clementine Creevy of Cherry Glazerr named Public Strain one of her 10 favorite albums of the decade. Bradford Cox of Deerhunter named the album his favorite "lost classic", stating: "They were very advanced instrumentally ... I couldn’t come up with music like that if my life depended on it. I think they had a bizarrely huge impact on the younger groups coming up now." VanGaalen would discuss how numerous artists would request for a Public Strain like sound in their own recordings. Ian Russel of Flemish Eye—the label that had released Public Strain originally—referenced Brian Eno's comment on The Velvet Underground & Nico: "Everyone who bought the Velvet Underground’s first album started a band. Everyone who bought Women’s ‘Public Strain’ started a Bandcamp." Russel reflected upon the album's legacy in the light of Women's subsequent breakup:

It was not exactly easy material to get into ... We were going down that road of trying to [get an audience] when it all imploded. So it was both a story about us being excited about a record ... and not seeing it come to fruition because two months later it wasn’t being talked about anymore ... The story was over. It had its impact more as a long-term influence on other artists.

== Track listing ==
No.	Title	Length
1.	"Can't You See"	3:41
2.	"Heat Distraction"	4:05
3.	"Narrow With the Hall"	2:37
4.	"Penal Colony"	2:39
5.	"Bells"	3:22
6.	"China Steps"	4:22
7.	"Untogether"	3:09
8.	"Drag Open"	4:53
9.	"Locust Valley"	4:15
10.	"Venice Lockjaw"	2:48
11.	"Eyesore"	6:25
Total length:		42:18

== Personnel ==
Derived from the album's Bandcamp page and liner notes.

Women

- Patrick Flegel – guitar, vocals
- Matthew Flegel – bass, vocals
- Michael Wallace – drums
- Christopher Reimer – cello, guitar, vocals

Technical

- Richard Harrow – mastering
- Chad VanGaalen – recording, mixing, production, additional instrumentation and vocals
