= Viet Cong (album) =

Studio album by Viet Cong
- Released: January 20, 2015
- Recorded: 2014
- Studio: The Barn Window Studio; Lost Cause Studios; Basketball 4 Life; Monty's Place
- Genre: Post-punk; art punk; noise rock
- Length: 37:04
- Label: Flemish Eye; Jagjaguwar
- Producer: Matt Flegel; Scott Munro; Graham Walsh

Preoccupations chronology
Cassette (2013)	Viet Cong (2015)	Preoccupations (2016)

Viet Cong is the debut studio album by Canadian rock band Viet Cong. It was released on January 20, 2015, by Flemish Eye in Canada and Jagjaguwar internationally. Viet Cong is the only album released by the band under this name, as they changed their name to Preoccupations in 2016.

The first single from the album, "Continental Shelf", was released for streaming on October 15, 2014. The album also features a re-recorded version of a previous song, "Bunker Buster". The band embarked on a North American and European tour in support of the album.

== Production ==
The album was recorded during 2014 at The Barn Window Studio, Lost Cause Studios, Basketball 4 Life and Monty's Place.

== Critical reception ==
Professional ratings
Aggregate scores
Source	Rating
AnyDecentMusic?	8.0/10
Metacritic	77/100
Review scores
Source	Rating
AllMusic	4/5 stars
Consequence of Sound	B−
Exclaim!	9/10
The Guardian	4/5 stars
Mojo	3/5 stars
NME	8/10
Pitchfork	8.5/10
Rolling Stone	3/5 stars
Spin	8/10
Uncut	7/10

Upon its release, Viet Cong received mainly positive reviews from music critics. At Metacritic, which assigns a normalized rating out of 100 to reviews from mainstream critics, the album has received an average score of 77, based on 23 reviews, indicating "generally favourable reviews". Writing for Exclaim!, Cam Lindsay noted that "Viet Cong maintains the same shadowy, droning tones that haunted Cassette, only taking them deeper into the abyss".

=== Accolades ===
The album was a shortlisted nominee for the 2015 Polaris Music Prize.

Publication	Accolade	Year	Rank
NME	NME's Albums of the Year 2015	2015	46
Stereogum	The 50 Best Albums of 2015	2015	45
Pitchfork	Pitchfork Readers' Poll Top 50 Albums	2015	18

== Track listing ==
No.	Title	Length
1.	"Newspaper Spoons"	3:02
2.	"Pointless Experience"	2:59
3.	"March of Progress"	6:19
4.	"Bunker Buster"	5:55
5.	"Continental Shelf"	3:20
6.	"Silhouettes"	4:12
7.	"Death"	11:17
Total length:		37:04

== Personnel ==
Viet Cong

- Matt Flegel – bass guitar, vocals
- Mike Wallace – drums
- Scott Munro – guitar
- Daniel Christiansen – guitar
