= Arrangements (album) =

Studio album by Preoccupations
- Released: September 9, 2022
- Recorded: October 2020 – March 2022
- Studio: Studio Saint Zo; Junimo Studio; Young Bast North; Spiceworld; Jewel St Recording
- Genre: Post-punk
- Length: 38:11
- Label: Flemish Eye
- Producer: Scott Munro; Matthew Flegel; Michael Wallace

Preoccupations chronology
New Material (2018)	Arrangements (2022)	Ill at Ease (2025)

Singles from Arrangements
- 1. "Ricochet" Released: June 14, 2022; 2. "Death of Melody" Released: July 26, 2022; 3. "Slowly" Released: September 8, 2022

Arrangements is the fourth studio album by Canadian post-punk band Preoccupations. The album was released through Flemish Eye in Canada and self released in the rest of the world on September 9, 2022. It is the third album under the name "preoccupations" The album gap of four-and-a-half years was the longest in the band's career.

== Track listing ==
All music is composed by Matt Flegel, Mike Wallace, Scott Munro, and Daniel Christiansen.

Arrangements track listing
No.	Title	Length
1.	"Fix Bayonets!"	4:45
2.	"Ricochet"	5:04
3.	"Death of Melody"	3:53
4.	"Slowly"	5:01
5.	"Advisor"	7:34
6.	"Recalibrate"	5:38
7.	"Tearing Up the Grass"	6:13
Total length:		38:11

== Critical reception ==
Professional ratings
Aggregate scores
Source	Rating
Album of the Year	73/100
Metacritic	72/100
Review scores
Source	Rating
Allmusic	3.5/5 stars
Beats Per Minute	77/100
DIY	3.5/5 stars
Exclaim!	7/10
Loud and Quiet	9/10
Pitchfork	6.4/10
PopMatters	7/10
Uncut	3.5/5 stars

Arrangements received positive reviews. At Metacritic, which assigns a normalized rating out of 100 to reviews from mainstream publications, the album received an average score of 72, based on four reviews, indicating "general favorable reviews". Writing for Beats Per Minute, John Amen gave the album a rating of 77% and commented that "...what distinguishes Preoccupations from many of their postpunk peers is not so much a distinct take on the usual sources – Joy Division, Bauhaus, The Cure, et al – but a more subtle and career-long affinity with such bands as Sonic Youth, Swans, and Sunn O))). That is, Preoccupations' brand of postpunk is denser, grittier, and more panoramic than the versions produced by many of their contemporaries."
