= World's Most Stressed Out Gardener =

Studio album by Chad VanGaalen
- Released: March 19, 2021
- Studio: Yoko Eno Studio, Calgary, Alberta
- Label: Flemish Eye; Sub Pop
- Producer: Chad VanGaalen

Chad VanGaalen chronology
Lost Harmonies (2020)	World's Most Stressed Out Gardener (2021)

Singles from World's Most Stressed Out Gardener
- 1. "Samurai Sword" Released: January 28, 2021; 2. "Nightwaves" Released: February 23, 2021

Professional ratings
Aggregate scores
Source	Rating
Metacritic	79/100
Review scores
Source	Rating
AllMusic	3.5/5 stars
DIY	4/5 stars
Exclaim!	8/10
Loud and Quiet	8/10
Pitchfork	7.3/10
Uncut	8/10

World's Most Stressed Out Gardener is the ninth studio album by Canadian musician Chad VanGaalen. It was released on March 19, 2021, by Sub Pop worldwide and Flemish Eye in Canada.

== Background ==
All the tracks on the album were written and recorded by Chad VanGaalen at his Yoko Eno Studio in Calgary, Alberta, and mastered by Ryan Morey in Montreal, Quebec.

== Promotion ==
Chad VanGaalen is scheduled to do a livestream of the album from his studio through the livestreaming platform NoonChorus on April 8, 2021.

== Release ==
On January 28, 2021, VanGaalen announced he was releasing his ninth studio album, along with the single "Samurai Sword". The animated music video for the single was released the same day, and featured a variety of hidden easter eggs for the viewer to find and enter on VanGaalen's website. Of the single, VanGaalen said: "I had just ripped a bunch of old leaking copper pipe out of my basement in a reno job that I jumped into willy nilly. Realizing how magical the pipes sounded, I put them on some dirty styrofoam and banged out the janky beat that introduces the song! Garbage is life. It just spilled out in a couple minutes. I didn’t try to stop it because I was smiling like I was just cruising through my neighbourhood. Simple like a sandbox. An ode to the simplicity. It’s hard to let things be simple. But simple is easy on the mind, and being jovial in song is something I find really difficult."

The second single "Nightwaves" was released on February 23, 2021.

== Critical reception ==
World's Most Stressed Out Gardener was met with "generally favorable" reviews from critics. At Metacritic, which assigns a weighted average rating out of 100 to reviews from mainstream publications, this release received an average score of 79 based on 4 reviews.

In a review for Exclaim!, Alex Hudson wrote: "World's Most Stressed Out Gardener, his first official album since 2017 feels a bit like half a dozen albums in one. The instrumentals are perhaps even stranger, ranging from the pastoral trills of "Flute Peace" to the Twin Peaks synth pads of "Earth from a Distance" to the Eastern strings of "Plant Music." Dominic Haley of Loud and Quiet explained: "The new carpe diem attitude has led to an album that tends to feel like an honest reflection of the singer’s internal monologue. It's great to connect with someone else who’s spent the previous twelve months teetering between telling themselves that everything’s fine and a full-on existential crisis." At DIY, Joe Goggins explained: "Underlining everything is a sense that he’s [Chad] playing to his musical strengths, both in terms of the way he incorporates so many aspects of his sonic calling card; droll lyricism, field recordings, off-kilter melodies, and a general sense that he’s having the analog and the electronic meet at deliberately awkward junctures.

== Track listing ==
World's Most Stressed Out Gardener track listing
No.	Title	Length
1.	"Spider Milk"
2.	"Flute Peace"
3.	"Starlight"
4.	"Where Is It All Going?"
5.	"Earth From a Distance"
6.	"Nightwaves"
7.	"Plant Music"
8.	"Nothing Is Strange"
9.	"Inner Fire"
10.	"Golden Pear"
11.	"Nightmare Scenario"
12.	"Samurai Sword"
13.	"Water Brother"
