= Flourish // Perish =

Studio album by Braids
- Released: 20 August 2013
- Recorded: Montreal, 2012–2013
- Genres: Electronic, art rock, dream pop, indietronica
- Labels: Arbutus Records, Full Time Hobby, Flemish Eye
- Producer: Braids

Braids chronology
| Native Speaker (2011) | Flourish // Perish (2013) | Deep in the Iris (2015) |

Singles from Flourish // Perish
- 1. "Freund" Released: 2 September 2013

Flourish // Perish is the second studio album by the Canadian experimental pop/art rock band Braids, released by Arbutus Records, Full Time Hobby and Flemish Eye on August 20, 2013.

== Background ==
=== Writing and recording ===
Writing of the album began in 2011, when the band debuted unreleased new songs while touring for their first album, Native Speaker. Some of the songs played on the tour are; "Victoria" and "In Kind" survived to be included on Flourish // Perish. A third song, "Deep Running", was released for free on YouTube on 28 April 2014. The band invested most of 2012 recording the album in the band's garage in Montreal (which they converted into a recording studio) and at the Centre Phi. Keyboardist Katie Lee left the band at an unspecified point during the year, though she featured extensively on the album.

The band discussed the direction of the album in May 2012, hinting it would be electronic-based. The change in sound grew out of the band's dissatisfaction with the constraints of guitars and acoustic drums. In April 2013, Raphaelle Standell-Preston revealed the band had abandoned guitars and that closing track "In Kind" (performed live with guitars on the Native Speaker tour) was the only song on the album which featured the instrument. Much of the songwriting took place on a computer and unlike while recording Native Speaker, the band "embraced the more emotional side of things, rather than trying to be super technically proficient".

The band decided against recording live and instead recorded the songs sequentially, laying down the instrumental parts separately. The band wrote between 13 and 14 songs and considered releasing the material as two EPs before agreeing to release a 10-track album. Mixing was completed in January 2013, with the mastering handled by Harris Newman at Grey Market Mastering in February. The album title and track list were announced in May 2013. The album was preceded by the In Kind // Amends EP, released on June 11, 2013.

=== Musical style and influences ===
When asked about the band's new sound, Standell-Preston stated: "We made up a genre called natural electronica. Natural components making up electronic music. Like the voice and drums, more organic elements combined with electronic. We are very much electronic in the way we composed the last record, using the computer. Aside from the drums and my voice it’s all super synthesized. Natural electronica". The singer explained that the band's stylistic change evolved because "over the two years that we toured Native Speaker, we became really heavily into and inspired by electronic music, we listened to so much of it. It's strikingly beautiful, it's very amazing and to me it reflects where we have gone to as a human race in 2013 and our involvement with the iPhone and laptops and everybody being interconnected". The band cited Baths, Azeda Booth, Aphex Twin, Autechre, Radiohead (Kid A, The King of Limbs), Portishead (Third), Max Cooper, Massive Attack ("Teardrop"), Stephen Bodsen, James Blake, Pantha du Prince, Born Gold, Goombay Dance Band and a number of Warp Records artists as influences for the album.

=== Title and themes ===
During the making of the album, the band felt that five of the songs sounded "pop" and "upbeat", while the remainder were cold, introspective and more electronic. Standell-Preston and Austin Tufts explained that the title Flourish // Perish was a reflection of the two sides of the album and the difficult time the band had creating it: "We started off as four people, we let Katie go and felt depressed and lost. Then we picked ourselves up and did it. We continued to write music and things just got amazing. Everything that we went through, it also calls upon the two main states of life, flourishing and perishing. You’re born, you flourish, you flourish to perish". Contemplative and sombre emotions are present on the album, which arose from the sadness, regret and doubt following the departure of Lee. Regarding the song "Together", Standell-Preston stated that it "is just about really missing her (Lee) and wondering if we can do it as the three of us and feeling really, really scared". "Amends" was also influenced by the conflict between Standell-Preston and Lee, while "Victoria" documents Standell-Preston's "crazy bouts of depression". "Hossak" is described as "a requiem for a friend who succumbed to LSD".

=== Artwork ===
Designer Marc Rimmer created the album's cover art, a floating black orb. The band explained that the new music lacked colour and that the stark image "represents the record's dependence and experimentation with technology". The artwork was nominated for the 2013 Best Art Vinyl award.

== Legacy ==
The band view the Flourish // Perish period as one of struggle. Austin Tufts remarked in April 2015 that "the whole process was a struggle from the get-go. We started writing it with four people, ended up parting ways with Katie – the whole thing was a struggle. Learning how to play those songs live was a struggle. Touring those songs and trying to inject some sort of live energy into a record that was solely created, for the most part, using a computer, with three people". The band also felt "limited" by using computers and recording in the confines of their garage in Montreal.

== Critical reception ==
Professional ratings
Review scores
| Source | Rating |
|---|---|
| Allmusic | 4/5 stars |
| Clash | 8/10 stars |
| Consequence of Sound | 3.5/5 stars |
| Drowned in Sound | 8/10 stars |
| Exclaim! | 8/10 stars |
| musicOMH | 4/5 stars |
| New Musical Express | 8/10 stars |
| Now | 4/5 stars |
| Paste | 7.5/10 stars |
| Pitchfork | 7.1/10 |
| PopMatters | 8/10 stars |
| Q | 6/10 stars |
| Slant Magazine | 3.5/5 stars |
| Spin | 7/10 stars |
| This Is Fake DIY | 8/10 stars |
| Under the Radar | 8/10 stars |

Upon its release, the album received generally good reviews from music critics. Aggregating website AnyDecentMusic? reported a score of 7.6 based on 16 professional reviews.

== Personnel ==
- Raphaelle Standell-Preston – guitar, lead vocals
- Katie Lee – keyboard, vocals
- Austin Tufts – drums, vocals
- Taylor Smith – bass, guitar, samples, percussion, vocals

== Track listing ==
| No. | Title | Length |
|---|---|---|
| 1. | "Victoria" | 3:55 |
| 2. | "Fruend" | 4:49 |
| 3. | "December" | 4:44 |
| 4. | "Hossak" | 3:16 |
| 5. | "Girl" | 2:55 |
| 6. | "Together" | 8:18 |
| 7. | "Ebben" | 5:56 |
| 8. | "Amends" | 6:04 |
| 9. | "Juniper" | 6:27 |
| 10. | "In Kind" | 7:49 |
