= Diaper Island =

Studio album by Chad VanGaalen
- Released: May 17, 2011
- Recorded: 2009–2010
- Studios: Yoko Eno Studio, Calgary, Alberta
- Genres: Indie rock Folk; Experimental
- Labels: Flemish Eye; Sub Pop
- Producer: Chad VanGaalen

Chad VanGaalen chronology
Soft Airplane (2008)	Diaper Island (2011)	Shrink Dust (2014)

Professional ratings
Aggregate scores
Source	Rating
Metacritic	79/100
Review scores
Source	Rating
The A.V. Club	(9.1/10)
Drowned in Sound	(8/10)
AllMusic	(8/10)

Diaper Island is the fourth studio album by Canadian musician Chad VanGaalen, released on May 17, 2011 on Flemish Eye in Canada and Sub Pop in the United States.

== Background ==
It is the first of his own albums which VanGaalen recorded in his new home studio named Yoko Eno (after artists Brian Eno and Yoko Ono), as opposed to the basement studio where he recorded his second and third releases.

== Track listing ==
All songs written by Chad VanGaalen.

1. "Do Not Fear"
2. "Peace on the Rise"
3. "Burning Photographs"
4. "Heavy Stones"
5. "Sara"
6. "Replace Me"
7. "Blonde Hash"
8. "Freedom for a Policeman"
9. "Can You Believe It!?"
10. "Wandering Spirits"
11. "No Panic / No Heat"
12. "Shave My Pussy"

== Charts ==
Chart (2011)	Peak position
Canadian Albums Chart	100
