= Women (band) =

Canadian indie rock band

- Origin: Calgary, Alberta, Canada
- Genres: Indie rock; post-punk; neo-psychedelia; avant-rock; noise rock; lo-fi; post-rock
- Years active: 2007–2012
- Labels: Flemish Eye; Jagjaguwar
- Spinoffs: Preoccupations; Cindy Lee
- Past members: Patrick Flegel; Christopher Reimer; Matt Flegel; Mike Wallace
- Website: www.myspace.com/womenmusic

Women was a Canadian indie rock band from Calgary, Alberta, that formed in 2008. It comprised Patrick Flegel, Christopher Reimer, Matt Flegel and Mike Wallace. The band's experimental style, which eschewed the polished post-punk revival sound for lo-fi recording techniques and eerie, dissonant soundscapes, proved influential on the post-punk scene of the 2010s onwards.

Their debut album Women was released on Chad VanGaalen's label Flemish Eye on July 8, 2008 in Canada and on Jagjaguwar in the United States on October 7, 2008. In October 2010, shortly after the release of Women's second album Public Strain, the band went on indefinite hiatus following a fight on stage at a show at Lucky Bar in Victoria. The group eventually dissolved following Reimer's passing in 2012, with Matt Flegel and Wallace reconvening as Viet Cong (now named Preoccupations), whilst Patrick Flegel started performing as Cindy Lee.

== History ==
Women's debut album, Women, recorded by Chad VanGaalen, gained positive recognition from music publications including Pitchfork, AllMusic, PopMatters, Vue Weekly, and as well as other varied music blogs. The band's sound has been likened to "sunny Beach Boys pop [...] dragged into a dark alley and gleefully mutilated", as well as compared to other bands The Velvet Underground and The Zombies. Pitchfork Media named their song "Black Rice" from their debut album the 18th best track of 2008.

After the release of their debut album Women extensively toured throughout 2008 and 2009, performing over 180 times in North America, Europe and the UK. Highlight performances took place at Barcelona's Primavera Sound, Austin's SXSW, Chicago's Pitchfork Music Festival and London's The Lexington. The band has toured or performed with Mogwai, Abe Vigoda, Dungen, Deerhunter, and Eric's Trip. The song "Black Rice" was also listed by Pitchfork as the 410th best song of the 2000s.

Women's second album, Public Strain, was released in Canada, via Flemish Eye, and in the United States, UK, and Europe, via Jagjaguwar, on September 28, 2010. The album received praise from across the media spectrum, including Pitchfork, Exclaim!, Filter, and the BBC. Public Strain also topped the !earshot Top 50 Chart in October that year.

The band began a European tour, followed by a US tour in the fall of 2010. It was rumoured that the band broke up on October 29, 2010, after a fight on stage at a show at Lucky Bar in Victoria although their management stated that they merely cancelled the rest of their tour. Matt Flegel later confirmed in an interview with Marc Riley on BBC 6 that a fight had in fact broken out on stage between Patrick and the band, prematurely ending their tour. Pitchfork released a three-song live video in February 2011 shot in an empty factory a few weeks before the band's indefinite hiatus.

Some members of Women also played in the live band of Chad VanGaalen. Pat Flegel was a member of the band Fels-Naptha, and Michael Wallace is a former member of the bands Friendo and Azeda Booth, and toured with Porcelain Raft. Christopher Reimer toured with The Dodos during the summer and fall of 2011.

On February 8, 2012, guitarist Christopher Reimer performed at Weeds Cafe in Calgary, recorded by Brad Hawkins. Thirteen days later, on February 21, Reimer died in his sleep. No information about the cause of Reimer's death was immediately released, however the band's record label, Flemish Eye, later stated that he had suffered "from complications relating to a heart condition".

In 2012, Chad van Gaalen released The Chad Tape, containing 9 Reimer solo tracks. In 2018, Reimer's family and friends released heaps of his recordings in the album Hello People.

Following the dissolution of the band and Reimer's death, Matthew Flegel and Michael Wallace formed the band Preoccupations (formerly Viet Cong) in 2012, while Pat Flegel formed Cindy Lee.

== Discography ==
=== Studio albums ===
- Women (Flemish Eye / Jagjaguwar, 2008)
- Public Strain (Flemish Eye / Jagjaguwar, 2010)

=== Extended play ===
- Rarities 2007-2010 (Flemish Eye / Jagjaguwar, 2020)

=== Singles ===
- "Service Animal/Grey Skies" 7" (Jagjaguwar, 2010)
- "Women / Cold Pumas / Fair Ohs / Friendo Split 7"" (Faux Discx, 2011)

=== Video ===
- Pitchfork Presents: A Three Song Live Special (Feb 2011)

=== Chris Reimer ===
- The Chad Tape (Flemish Eye, 2012, posthumous)
- Hello People (Flemish Eye, 2018, posthumous)

== Members ==
Former
- Patrick Flegel – guitar, vocals (2007–2012)
- Matthew Flegel – bass, percussion, vocals (2007–2012)
- Michael Wallace – drums (2007–2012)
- Christopher Reimer – guitar, samples, vocals (2007–2012; deceased)
