= Jane Vain and the Dark Matter =

- Origin: Calgary, Alberta, Canada
- Genres: Indie, pop
- Years active: 2005–present
- Labels: Rectangle Records
- Members: Jamie Fooks; Markus Lake; Nathan Curry
- Past members: Dillon Whitfield; Stewart Elton; Shawn Dicey; Britt Proulx; Jared Larson; Raphaelle Standell-Preston; Jzero Schuurman; Laurie Fuhr; Maya Ciring; Mark Hamilton; Liz Collins; Andrew Davidson

Jane Vain and the Dark Matter is an indie rock band formed in 2005 from Calgary, Alberta, Canada. The band is fronted by Calgary native Jamie Fooks, and signed to Edmonton’s Rectangle Records. They describe their sound as indie electro-pop. The Montreal Mirror called their music "melancholy" and "macabre," and Fooks has been compared to Emily Haines, Cat Power, and Fiona Apple. They released their first full-length album, Love Is Where the Smoke Is, in January 2008.

== History ==
Jamie Fooks (vocals, guitar, keyboards) was born and raised in Calgary. She attended Crescent Heights High School, the same school as musicians Tegan and Sara, Paul Brandt, and former Alberta premier Ralph Klein. She began writing songs in her late teens, in what she admits was a way to get in touch with emotions "left over from a reckless adolescence," at a time in her life when she was feeling extremely isolated from people in her age group and looking to find a niche for herself.

She began experimenting with recording software, teaching herself to sing, compose and write songs. After learning to record, she set out learning how to play her own songs. At this point she began performing live at open mic nights in Calgary accompanied by guitarist Dillon Whitfield, her future bandmate in Calgary indie band Raccoon.

Their sets consisted of drum beats and bass (programmed on Fooks’s computer), Whitfield’s chaotic guitar playing, and Fooks on vocals. Fooks admits that the first nights ended in tears but with encouragement from Whitfield and her friends she was persuaded to continue performing. Later they were joined by a live rhythm section consisting of Shawn Dicey (of Ontario’s alternative country band Ox) on drums and Stewart Elton on bass., and eventually signed to Edmonton's Rectangle Records in 2007.

Fooks wrote, produced and recorded all the songs on the band's debut album. Described by her interviewers as modest and self-aware, Fooks cites Cat Power, whom she has been compared to, as a major musical influence. The highlight of her career to date was playing onstage with Power at the Sled Island music festival in 2007. She also credits Mark Hamilton, of Calgary’s Woodpigeon as a mentor and a major collaborator on the album. In July 2008, the group was nominated for two of XM Satellite Radio’s Verge Music Awards, Best Album and Best Artist. The band spent the entire summer of 2008 touring Canada.

Asked about the origin of the band's name, Fooks once explained: "Jane is my mother's name....vanity scares me....so does the dark....[I] think it's about overcoming the things that scare me or make me feel sad," adding that "the dark matter thing just kind of popped out in a random conversation."

Fooks was in a relationship with Whitfield for some time, but currently resides in Montreal, Quebec, where Jane Vain opened a national tour in support of their second studio album, Give Us Your Hands, on June 11, 2010.

== Collaborators ==
The band has been described a "revolving door" for musicians from the Calgary music scene. Whitfield, former member of Suicide Boys and the founder of Raccoon, joined in 2005. Other past and present members include Britt Proulx (also of Raccoon), Markus Lake (bass), Jared Larsen (solo artist), and Jzero Schuurman (of Alberta experimental/folk groups Psychic Pollution, and Lucid 44). Shawn Dicey (drums) of Ox and Rocketsmog, and Stewart Elton (bass) have also worked with the group.

Jane Vain and the Dark Matter’s first album, Love Is Where the Smoke Is, features contributions by Calgary musicians Mark Hamilton (ukulele, banjo, guitar, vocals), Foon Yap (violin), Woodpigeon's Annalea Sordi (vocals), Jesse Locke of SIDS, and Matt Flegel of The Cape May.

== Sound ==
Jane Vain and The Dark Matter are often described as a "pop noir" group. The band describes Whitfield’s guitar playing as "haphazard" and Fooks’s experimentation with computerized sounds is evident in the electronic beats strung together with sparse piano arrangements. Her vocals are smoky and breathy and her lyrics explore the trials of being young and modern, and "pay homage to love’s violence."

Calgary magazine FFWD has said that Fooks channels "nervous energy and musical brilliance into a personal outpouring of epic swells, evasive melodies and frenetic force." The Montreal Mirror describes their songs as being "[n]uanced arrangements of strings, synths, guitar, piano, percussion and electronic beats [that] form an elegant but vibrant base for Fooks’s lovely vocals, and melancholy, even macabre little narratives." Jane Vain assert that they are "aiming for anxious chaos, but achieving a careful clarity" in their music.

== Discography ==
- Love Is Where the Smoke Is (2008)
- Give Us Your Hands (2010)

== See also ==
- Music of Canada
- Canadian rock
- List of Canadian musicians
- List of bands from Canada
- Category:Canadian musical groups
