= Light Information =

Studio album by Chad VanGaalen
- Released: September 8, 2017
- Studio: Yoko Eno Studio, Calgary, Alberta
- Genre: Indie rock Folk; Experimental
- Label: Flemish Eye; Sub Pop
- Producer: Chad VanGaalen

Chad VanGaalen chronology
Shrink Dust (2014)	Light Information (2017)	Lost Harmonies (2020)

Professional ratings
Aggregate scores
Source	Rating
Metacritic	78/100
Review scores
Source	Rating
Drowned in Sound	(8/10)
Dusted Magazine	(8/10)
Pitchfork Media	(7.4/10)
The Skinny	(4/5)

Light Information is the sixth studio album by Canadian musician Chad VanGaalen. It was released by Flemish Eye in Canada and Sub Pop in the United States on September 8, 2017.

While alienation has always been a theme of VanGaalen's music, Light Information draws on a new kind of wisdom – and anxiety – gained as he watches his kids growing up. "Being a parent has given me a sort of alternate perspective, worrying about exposure to a new type of consciousness that's happening through the internet," he says. "I didn't have that growing up, and I’m maybe trying to preserve a little bit of that selfishly for my kids."

== Background ==
As always, VanGaalen wrote, played, and produced all of the music on Light Information (save Ryan Bourne's bass part on "Mystery Elementals" and vocals on "Static Shape" from his young daughters, Ezzy and Pip), and designed the cover art. The album was recorded in VanGaalen's Yoko Eno studio in Calgary.

== Track listing ==
All songs written by Chad VanGaalen.

1. "Mind Hijacker's Curse"
2. "Locked in the Phase"
3. "Prep Piano and 770"
4. "Host Body"
5. "Mystery Elementals"
6. "Old Heads"
7. "Golden Oceans"
8. "Faces Lit"
9. "Pine and Clover"
10. "You Fool"
11. "Broken Bell"
12. "Static Shape"
