= Native Speaker (album) =

Studio album by Braids
- Released: 18 January 2011
- Recorded: Montreal, Quebec, 2010
- Genres: Indie rock, avant-garde pop, art rock, dream pop
- Length: 43:47
- Label: Kanine Records
- Producer: Braids

Braids chronology
Native Speaker (2011)	Flourish // Perish (2013)

Singles from Native Speaker
- 1. "Lemonade"; 2. "Plath Heart" Released: 8 May 2011

Native Speaker is the debut studio album by the Canadian experimental pop/art rock band Braids, released by Flemish Eye/Kanine Records on January 18, 2011 (April 11 in the UK) to critical acclaim.

== Background ==
The band started working on Native Speaker in Montreal in September 2009. The recording of the album was completed during the winter of 2010. After negotiating with labels in the United States and Canada, Braids announced Chad VanGaalen's label Flemish Eye would distribute Native Speaker in Canada and Kanine Records would release the album in the United States. According to the band's Q interview, it cost less than $500 to make. "We just had to rent drum mics and cover the mastering. I guess we only have to sell about 100 copies to break even!", Raphaelle Standell-Preston remarked.

The album was self-produced, although not due to its low budget. "It was primarily for creative control. None of us had recorded before so it took a really long time to get it right – about nine months", the singer explained.

The big thing for us was being sure of when we'd reached excellence, knowing which of the 400 guitar takes or vocal tracks was the perfect one. I was in tears at points because I felt I was falling short of perfection. We really overworked ourselves. – Raphaelle Standell-Preston, Q interview

Standell-Preston, the chief lyricist, said the album describes "the changes in her life from Calgary schoolgirl to Montreal musician, and the discovery of sexuality and relationships along the way". She also remarked in 2013 that "everything besides the title track is so angry. I was so upset and felt like the world was really unfair".

=== Musical style and influences ===
The band's way of mixing pop and avant-garde music met with much critical acclaim. "Braids' uniquely feminine experimental pop is largely a success", argued Allmusic, mentioning Animal Collective, Björk, Karen O, Cocteau Twins, Siouxsie Sioux, and Yeasayer as possible influences. According to Spin, the album "pairs glimmering, pastoral post-rock with foul-mouthed lyrics", making this girl's psyche preparation a fascinating thing to watch. "This is a band that is all about abstraction, experimentation and, most important, obfuscation", a Prefix reviewer remarked. Ian Cohen of Pitchfork noted the peculiarity of the quartet's brand of dream pop, saying, "There are dreams, there are nightmares, and then there are those night visions that don't quite qualify as either, the unnerving images and dialogues that rattle about your head in your waking life for the rest of the day and reveal strange, forgotten details every time you pick at them. That's the kind of stuff we need to be talking about if we're going to call Braids 'dream-pop' as so many others have".

As Rolling Stone put it, the band's debut "takes the beatific psychedelic washes of Animal Collective back to the testy clatter of punk-folk wild women the Raincoats — an at times nutty, at times serene, mash-up of pastoral guitar babble, minimal orchestral drones, loopy chorale vocals and porous, roiling rhythms". Asked if the band was sick of the Animal Collective comparisons, Raphaelle Standell-Preston said: "Not at all. We were 17 when we first discovered the record Feels. We would go to parties and end up just sitting in the car and listening to Feels instead of going inside". Explaining the Sylvia Plath reference in the track "Plath Heart", the singer said: "My mother, who's a writer, did her thesis on The Bell Jar, so that's a novel I grew up with. Plath was a big influence on me when I was younger and feeling a bit morose and dark. As I'm getting older I'm like Jesus, Sylvia, lighten up". The title of the song "Lammicken" was taken from Tess of the d’Urbervilles, and the song's lyrics were inspired by the Old English meaning of the word, "weakness of a lamb".

== Release ==
Native Speaker peaked at No. 33 on the Billboard Heatseekers chart and at No. 13 on the Billboard Dance/Electronic Songs chart.

== Critical reception ==
Professional ratings
Review scores
Source	Rating
AllMusic	3.5/5 stars
Blurt	7.5/10 stars
CoS	3.5/5 stars
Drowned in Sound	4/5 stars
Eye Weekly	5/5 stars
New Musical Express	7/10 stars
Now	4/5 stars
Pitchfork Media	7.9 stars on a 10 point scale
PopMatters	6/10 stars
Q	4/5 stars
Rolling Stone	3.5/5 stars
Spin	4/5 stars
Sputnikmusic	4/5 stars
The A.V. Club	B
Tiny Mix Tapes	3.5/5 stars

Upon its release, the album received generally good reviews from music critics. Aggregating website AnyDecentMusic? reported a score of 7.4 based on 19 professional reviews.

Prefix magazine described Native Speaker as the "beguiling, bewitching debut album" calling it "this young year's early champion, an engrossing album that bears the very real possibility that you won’t 'get it' even after a dozen listens". "What's most astonishing is the fact that Native Speaker is self-produced, and that it's so self-assured," argued Andrew Winistorfer. "You’ll probably listen to more immediate albums this year, but few will have the down-the-rabbit-hole quality that marks Native Speaker for success". "Rarely do teenage kicks result in such eloquent, nuanced records as this", wrote Q reviewer Dan Stubbs, pointing out the way "the band's youth shines through the lyrics". "The quartet's bracing debut... is almost Inception-like in its warping of reality, equally tactile and dissolute, cerebral and surreal and ultimately haunting for its refusal to answer questions the same way twice," according to Pitchfork.

== Credits ==
- Raphaelle Standell-Preston – guitar, lead vocals
- Katie Lee – keyboard, vocals
- Austin Tufts – drums, vocals
- Taylor Smith – bass, guitar, samples, percussion, vocals
- Sebastian Cowan – mixing
- Harris Newman – mastering
- Marc Rimmer – design, visuals

== Track listing ==
No.	Title	Length
1.	"Lemonade"	6:46
2.	"Plath Heart"	4:25
3.	"Glass Deers"	8:09
4.	"Native Speaker"	8:24
5.	"Lammicken"	4:35
6.	"Same Mum"	7:01
7.	"Little Hand"	4:27
