= Skelliconnection =

Studio album by Chad VanGaalen
- Released: August 22, 2006
- Recorded: 2002–2006
- Genre: Rock
- Length: 39:06
- Label: Flemish Eye; Sub Pop
- Producer: Chad VanGaalen

Chad VanGaalen chronology
Infiniheart (2004)	Skelliconnection (2006)	Soft Airplane (2008)

Professional ratings
Review scores
Source	Rating
AllMusic	3/5 stars
Dusted Magazine	(favorable)
Pitchfork Media	7.5/10

Skelliconnection is the second album by Canadian musician Chad VanGaalen. It was released on August 22, 2006 on Flemish Eye (Canadian distribution) and Sub Pop (U.S. distribution). In addition to writing and recording the album, VanGaalen performed almost all of the instruments and drew the album artwork. Like VanGaalen's debut album, Infiniheart (2004), Skelliconnection comprises material from hundreds of homemade recordings.

On July 10, 2007, Skelliconnection was announced as a finalist for the Polaris Music Prize, alongside such other acts as The Dears, Julie Doiron, and Miracle Fortress. The winner, announced on September 24, 2007, was Close to Paradise by Patrick Watson. Many fans believe that the lyrics in the track "Red Hot Drops" are pertaining to intravenous drug use. The song "Gubbbish" was used on the hit television show The O.C.

== Track listing ==
1. "Flower Gardens" – 2:28
2. "Burn 2 Ash" – 2:51
3. "Red Hot Drops" – 3:15
4. "Rolling Thunder" – 1:54
5. "Viking Rainbow" – 1:46
6. "Gubbbish" – 3:32
7. "Dandrufff" – 0:27
8. "Wing Finger" – 3:05
9. "See-Thru-Skin" – 2:46
10. "Wind Driving Dogs" – 2:46
11. "Mini T.V.'s" – 2:48
12. "Graveyard" – 3:50
13. "Dead Ends" – 3:50
14. "Sing Me 2 Sleep" – 3:12
15. "Systemic Heart" – 0:30
