= New Material =

Studio album by Preoccupations
- Released: March 23, 2018
- Recorded: 2017
- Length: 36:07
- Labels: Flemish Eye; Jagjaguwar
- Producer: Scott Munro

Preoccupations chronology
Preoccupations (2016)	New Material (2018)	Arrangements (2022)

Singles from New Material
- 1. "Espionage" Released: January 16, 2018; 2. "Antidote" Released: February 13, 2018; 3. "Disarray" Released: March 20, 2018

New Material is the third studio album by Canadian rock band Preoccupations, released on March 23, 2018, by Flemish Eye in Canada and Jagjaguwar in the United States. It was the band's second album released under this name, after changing it from "Viet Cong" in 2015.

== Critical reception ==
Professional ratings
Aggregate scores
Source	Rating
AnyDecentMusic?	7.0/10
Metacritic	73/100
Review scores
Source	Rating
AllMusic	4/5 stars
Clash	7/10 stars
Exclaim!	6/10
No Ripcord	7/10
Paste	8.1/10
Pitchfork	7.6/10
PopMatters	7/10 stars
Q	3/5 stars
Sputnikmusic	2.9/5

New Material received positive reviews. At Metacritic, which assigns a normalized rating out of 100 to reviews from mainstream publications, the album received an average score of 73, based on 20 reviews, indicating "general favorable reviews".

== Track listing ==
All music is composed by Preoccupations.

No.	Title	Length
1.	"Espionage"	4:28
2.	"Decompose"	4:19
3.	"Disarray"	3:49
4.	"Manipulation"	3:14
5.	"Antidote"	6:01
6.	"Solace"	4:32
7.	"Doubt"	4:40
8.	"Compliance"	5:08
Total length:		36:07

== Personnel ==
The following individuals were credited for the production and composition of the album.

- Daniel Christiansen – group member
- Dave Cooley – mastering
- Matthew Flegel – group member, producer
- Miles Johnson – layout
- Rena Kozak – editing
- Justin Meldal-Johnsen – mixing, synthesizer bass
- Scott Munro – engineer, group member, producer
- Marc Rimmer – back cover photo, cover photo
- Mike Schuppan – mixing engineer
- Michael Wallace – additional production, group member

== Charts ==
Chart (2018)	Peak position
US Independent Albums (Billboard)	22
US Heatseekers Albums (Billboard)	5
US Indie Store Album Sales (Billboard)	12
US Vinyl Albums (Billboard)	25
