= Soft Airplane =

Studio album by Chad VanGaalen
- Released: September 9, 2008
- Recorded: 2008
- Genres: Indie rock; folk; experimental
- Length: 42:00
- Labels: Flemish Eye; Sub Pop
- Producer: Chad VanGaalen

Chad VanGaalen chronology
Skelliconnection (2006)	Soft Airplane (2008)	Diaper Island (2011)

Professional ratings
Aggregate scores
Source	Rating
Metacritic	74/100
Review scores
Source	Rating
AllMusic	3/5 stars
Paste	(8.8/10)
Pitchfork Media	(7.7/10)

Soft Airplane is the third album by Chad VanGaalen, released in 2008 on Flemish Eye and Sub Pop. It was VanGaalen's first album to consist entirely of songs newly recorded for the album; his prior releases compiled tracks from a library of home recordings he had made over a number of years.

The album was shortlisted for the 2009 Polaris Music Prize.

== Track listing ==
All tracks are written by Chad VanGaalen.

No.	Title	Length
1.	"Willow Tree"	3:13
2.	"Bones of Man"	2:59
3.	"Cries of the Dead"	3:47
4.	"Inside the Molecules"	3:45
5.	"Bare Feet on Wet Griptape"	2:30
6.	"Phantom Anthills"	3:00
7.	"Poisonous Heads"	3:15
8.	"TMNT Mask"	3:29
9.	"Molten Light"	2:51
10.	"Old Man + The Sea"	3:35
11.	"City of Electric Light"	2:32
12.	"Rabid Bits of Time"	3:24
13.	"Frozen Energon"	3:40
Total length:		42:17
