= Infiniheart =

Studio album by Chad VanGaalen
- Released: January 20, 2004; August 23, 2005 (Rerelease)
- Recorded: 2001–2003
- Genre: Rock
- Length: 64:57 (2004); 57:04 (2005)
- Label: Flemish Eye (2004); Sub Pop (2005)
- Producer: Chad VanGaalen

Chad VanGaalen chronology
Infiniheart (2004)	Skelliconnection (2006)

Professional ratings
Aggregate scores
Source	Rating
Metacritic	80/100
Review scores
Source	Rating
AllMusic	3.5/5 stars
Alternative Press	5/5 stars
Cokemachineglow	87%
Entertainment Weekly	B+
The Guardian	4/5 stars
NME	7/10
Paste	4/5 stars
Pitchfork	7.1/10
Tiny Mix Tapes	3.5/5 stars
Under the Radar	8/10

Infiniheart is an album by Canadian artist Chad VanGaalen. It was originally released in 2004 on Flemish Eye and was rereleased in 2005 on Sub Pop. The album was recorded in a makeshift studio in VanGaalen's basement, and uses a diverse array of instruments and equipment, almost all played by VanGaalen and some handmade by the artist. Overall, Infiniheart received favorable reviews and drew comparisons to The Flaming Lips and Neil Young.

== Track listing ==
1. "Clinically Dead" – 2:18
2. "After the Afterlife" – 3:38
3. "Kill Me in My Sleep" – 5:58
4. "The Warp Zone/Hidden Bridge" – 4:13
5. "J.C.'s Head on the Cross" – 3:18
6. "Somewhere I Know There Is Nothing" – 4:14
7. "Blood Machine" – 4:25
8. "Echo Train" – 3:19
9. "Build a Home Like a Bee" – 2:13
10. "I Miss You Like I Miss You" – 2:59
11. "Human Totem" – 2:56
12. "Red Blood" – 4:02
13. "1000 Pound Eyelids" – 3:29
14. "Graduated Assassin" – 2:53
15. "Chronograph #1" – 3:23
16. "Sunshine Snare Hits" – 3:58
17. "Liquid + Light" – 2:32
18. "Dolphinariums" – 2:21
19. "Traffic" – 2:48

=== Rerelease in 2005 ===
The album was rereleased on August 23, 2005 on Sub Pop with a different track listing.

1. "Clinically Dead"
2. "After the Afterlife"
3. "Kill Me in My Sleep"
4. "J.C.'s Head on the Cross"
5. "Somewhere I Know There Is Nothing"
6. "Blood Machine"
7. "Echo Train"
8. "Build a Home Like a Bee"
9. "I Miss You Like I Miss You"
10. "Red Blood"
11. "1000 Pound Eyelids"
12. "The Warp Zone/Hidden Bridge"
13. "Chronograph #1"
14. "Sunshine Snare Hits"
15. "Liquid + Light"
16. "Traffic"
