= Steph Cameron =

Canadian folk music singer-songwriter

Steph Cameron is a Canadian folk music singer-songwriter, whose debut album Sad-Eyed Lonesome Lady was a longlisted nominee for the 2015 Polaris Music Prize.

Originally from Saskatoon, Saskatchewan, she was based in Vancouver, British Columbia when she launched her music career. She recorded a demo under the stage name "Steph Infection", which resulted in her being signed to Pheromone Recordings.

She released Sad-Eyed Lonesome Lady in late 2014, and followed up in 2017 with Daybreak Over Jackson Street. In 2018, she released a non-album cover of Fleetwood Mac's "Gold Dust Woman".
