= Shrink Dust =

Studio album by Chad VanGaalen
- Released: April 29, 2014
- Studio: Yoko Eno Studio, Calgary, Alberta
- Genre: Indie rock Folk; Experimental
- Label: Flemish Eye; Sub Pop
- Producer: Chad VanGaalen

Chad VanGaalen chronology
Diaper Island (2011)	Shrink Dust (2014)	Light Information (2017)

Professional ratings
Aggregate scores
Source	Rating
Metacritic	78/100
Review scores
Source	Rating
Consequence of Sound	(B)
NME	(8/10)
Pitchfork Media	(7.8/10)

Shrink Dust is the fifth studio album by Canadian musician Chad VanGaalen. It was released by Flemish Eye in Canada and Sub Pop in the United States on April 29, 2014. The album was featured on the Toronto Star's website as part of their musical "reasons to live" sections.

The album was a longlisted nominee for the 2014 Polaris Music Prize.

The album was the most played across Canadian community radio in May, June, and July 2013, as tracked by the National Campus and Community Radio Association's charting service, !earshot.

== Background ==
The album was recorded in VanGaalen's Yoko Eno studio in Calgary. The album is partially intended to be a score to his upcoming sci-fi movie, and also, according to VanGaalen, a country record.

== Track listing ==
All songs written by Chad VanGaalen.

1. "Cut Off My Hands"
2. "Where Are You?"
3. "Frozen Paradise"
4. "Lila"
5. "Weighed Sin"
6. "Monster"
7. "Evil"
8. "Leaning on Bells"
9. "All Will Combine"
10. "Weird Love"
11. "Hangman's Son"
12. "Cosmic Destroyer"
