= Calgary Folk Music Festival =

Coordinates: 51.055°N 114.069°W

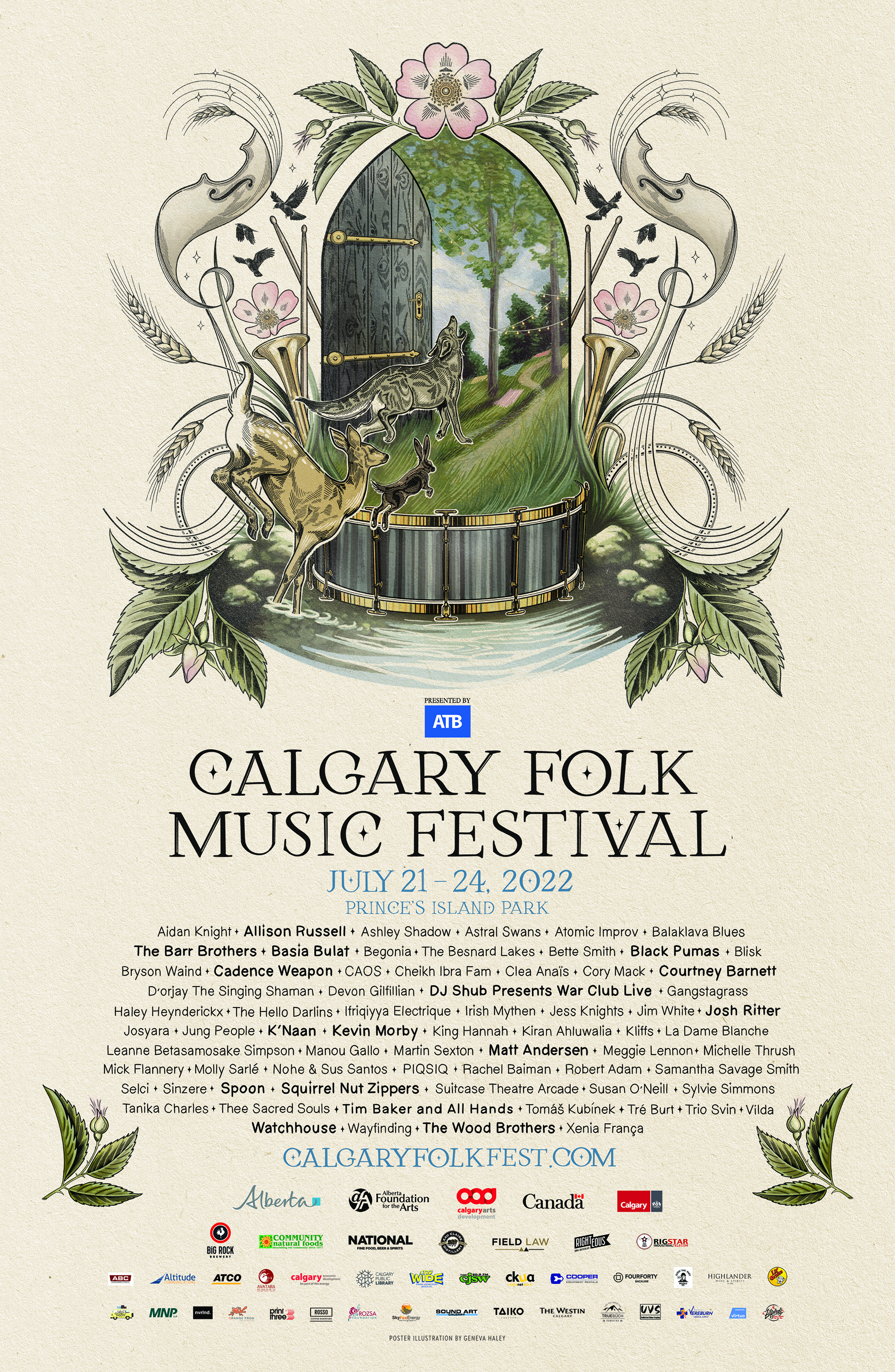
The 43rd annual Calgary Folk Music Festival took place July 21-24, 2022 on Prince's Island Park.

The Calgary Folk Music Festival (also known as "Calgary Folk Fest", or CFMF) is a Canadian music festival held on the fourth weekend of July each year at Prince's Island Park, Calgary, Alberta. The four-day event features 70 artists from over 15 countries, who perform for an audience of over 52,000 people across multiple stages.

The festival has attracted a diverse array of notable artists, including Father John Misty, Neko Case, Julia Jacklin, the Avett Brothers, David Byrne, Elvis Costello, Emmylou Harris, Andrew Bird, and Tanya Tagaq.

The 46th annual Calgary Folk Music Festival will take place July 24-27, 2025.

== Workshops ==
The Calgary Folk Music Festival has received praise from attendees for the inclusion of workshops in its programming. The workshops, also known as jam sessions, involve several musicians performing together on the same stage. They may be centred around a specific theme, and artists often play one another's songs or improvise together.

== Folk Boot Camp ==
In addition to the main festival weekend, the CFMF runs a series of intensive classes guided by festival artists at the National Music Centre. The three-day sessions allow participants to develop their musical skills in different areas including songwriting, arrangement, vocal techniques, and guitar.

== Songwriting Contest ==
Until 2016, the Calgary Folk Music Festival held an annual songwriting contest which awarded local Alberta musicians $20,000 in prizes and a chance to perform at the festival. Previous winners include Raphaelle Standell, Lisa Lobsinger, John Wort Hannam, and The Cape May. In 2016, CFMF ended its participation in the contest, leaving it to be continued by the Ship and Anchor pub exclusively.

== Block Heater ==
The Calgary Folk Music Festival also presents Block Heater, a winter music festival held each February on the Music Mile in the historic community of Inglewood. The winter festival hosts over 20 local, national and international artists for concerts and collaborative songwriter-in-the-round sessions at several venues throughout the neighbourhood and downtown Calgary. The 9th annual Block Heater music festival took place February 15-17, 2024.

== Festival Hall ==
Festival Hall is home to the Calgary Folk Music Festival's office and 200-seat performance space. Designed by Peter Cardew Architects and built in 2012, the building is equivalent to LEED Silver due to its reclaimed materials, geo-thermal heating and cooling systems, and architectural details, such as the timber ceiling.

The Hall extends the Festival into a year-round operation as the host of concerts, multi-media presentations, and workshops at the venue. It also functions as a meeting space for the festival's volunteers, a community space for event rentals, and a home for Calgary's arts community.

== See also ==
- List of festivals in Calgary
