= Preoccupations =

Canadian post-punk band

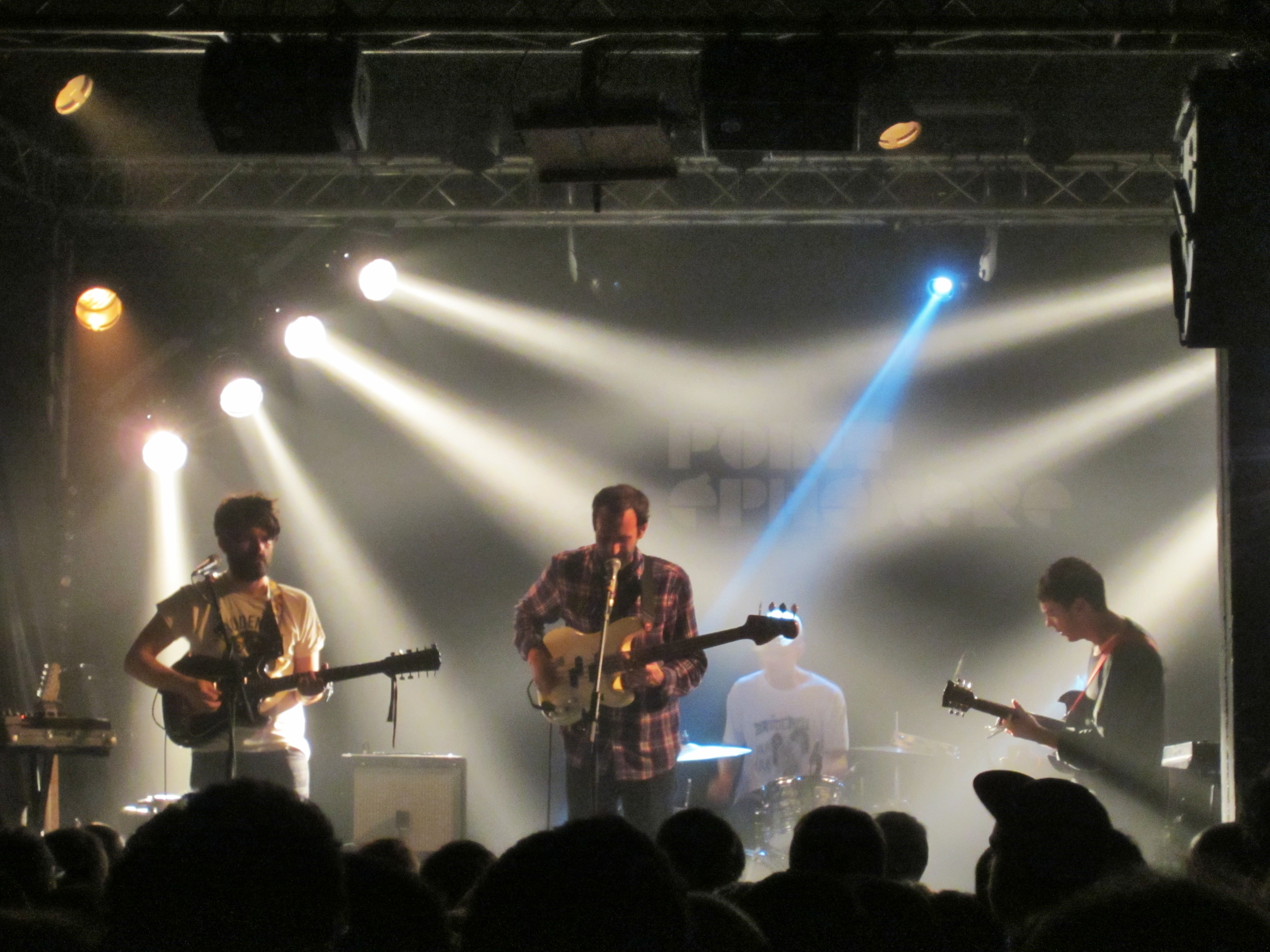
- Preoccupations performing at Le Point Ephémère in Paris, France, 9 February 2015.

Background information
- Also known as: Viet Cong (2012-2016)
- Origin: Calgary, Alberta, Canada
- Genres: Post-punk; art punk; indie rock; noise rock
- Years active: 2012–present
- Labels: Jagjaguwar; Mexican Summer; Flemish Eye; Born Losers
- Spinoff of: Women
- Members: Matt Flegel; Mike Wallace; Scott Munro; Daniel Christiansen
- Website: preoccupations.ca

Preoccupations is a Canadian post-punk band from Calgary, Alberta, that formed in 2012 under the name Viet Cong. It has comprised vocalist-bassist Matt Flegel, guitarist-keyboardist Scott Munro, guitarist Daniel Christiansen and drummer Mike Wallace since inception. Flegel and Wallace had previously been members of the band Women, which broke up in 2010. The group's musical style has been described as "labyrinthine post-punk".

To date, the band has released five studio albums: Viet Cong (2015), Preoccupations (2016), New Material (2018) Arrangements (2022), and Ill At Ease (2025).

== History ==
=== Formation and Viet Cong (2012–2015) ===
In 2010, the band Women entered an indefinite hiatus after an onstage fight. That band's guitarist, Christopher Reimer, died in 2012. Following Reimer's death and the disbanding of Women, ex-Women bassist Matt Flegel decided to form a new band with guitarist Scott Munro (formerly of Lab Coast); the two had recently toured together as live musicians for Chad VanGaalen. They recruited ex-Women drummer Mike Wallace and guitarist Daniel Christiansen (the latter previously performed in a Black Sabbath cover band alongside Flegel and Wallace).

The band's debut EP, a self-released cassette, was issued in 2013.

The band performed at SXSW festival in 2014, and then signed to Canadian record label Flemish Eye. The band's cassette release was reissued by Mexican Summer on vinyl on July 8, 2014.

The band released their debut album, Viet Cong, on January 20, 2015, on Jagjaguwar and Flemish Eye. The band announced plans for a North American and European tour to promote the album.

=== Name change and Preoccupations (2016–2017) ===
The band frequently faced controversy over their original name, involving accusations of both racism and cultural appropriation because of the name's association with the original Vietnamese Viet Cong. In March 2015, the band was set to perform at Oberlin College, but the show was cancelled due to their "offensive name".

In September 2015, the band announced that they were going to change their name, posting to their Facebook page, "We are a band who wants to make music and play our music for our fans. We are not here to cause pain or remind people of atrocities of the past". On March 29, 2016, the Canadian music magazine Exclaim! reported that the band were still booking shows under the name Viet Cong, and began running a real-time "Days since Viet Cong promised to change their name" counter on the magazine's website.

On April 21, 2016, Flegel announced in a Pitchfork interview that the band would henceforth be performing and recording under the name "Preoccupations". Their second studio album, Preoccupations, was released as a self-titled album under the name Preoccupations on September 16, 2016.

=== New Material, Arrangements And Ill At Ease (2018–present) ===
On January 16, 2018, the band previewed a new single, "Espionage". Their third studio album, New Material, was released on March 23, 2018. This was their last release on American imprint Jagjaguwar Records.

On October 5, 2020, the band announced on Twitter that they were working on a new album. This, their fourth studio album, titled Arrangements, was released on September 9, 2022 solely via Flemish Eye Records. In late 2024, On February 11, 2025, Preoccupations announced their fifth album Ill At Ease, which was released on May 9, 2025, via Born Losers Records.

== Musical style ==
The group's musical style has mainly been described as "post-punk". The band's debut cassette was described as a combination of "crooning post-punk vocals, distant-sounding harmonies à la Nuggets-era psychedelia, noise-addled punk, and Blade Runner-style instrumentals".

Asked about the band's new wave influences in 2016, Munro said, "Orchestral Manoeuvres in the Dark gets rocked a lot in the van, and we're all New Order fans of course... At least half of my favourite records are from the late seventies or the early eighties."

== Band members ==
- Matt Flegel – bass, vocals
- Mike Wallace – drums
- Scott "Monty" Munro – guitar, synth
- Daniel Christiansen – guitar

Timeline

== Discography ==
=== Studio albums ===
- Viet Cong (as Viet Cong) (2015, Flemish Eye/Jagjaguwar)
- Preoccupations (2016, Flemish Eye/Jagjaguwar)
- New Material (2018, Flemish Eye/Jagjaguwar)
- Arrangements (2022, Flemish Eye)
- Ill at Ease (2025, Born Losers)

=== EPs ===
- Cassette (2014, self-released/Mexican Summer)

=== Singles ===
- "Throw It Away" (2013, self-released)
- "Continental Shelf" (2014, Jagjaguwar)
- "Bunker Buster" (2014, Jagjaguwar)
- "Silhouettes" (2014, Jagjaguwar)
- "Anxiety" (2016, Jagjaguwar)
- "Stimulation" (2016, Jagjaguwar)
- "Degraded" (2016, Jagjaguwar)
- "Memory" (2016, Jagjaguwar)
- "Key / Off Duty Trip" (2016, Jagjaguwar)
- "Espionage" (2018, Jagjaguwar)
- "Antidote" (2018, Jagjaguwar)
- "Disarray" (2018, Jagjaguwar)
- "Decompose" (2018, Jagjaguwar)
- "Pontiac 87" (2018, Jagjaguwar)
- "Ricochet" (2022, self-released)
- "Death of Melody" (2022, self-released)
- "Slowly" (2022, self-released)
- "Focus" (2025, Born Losers)
- "MUR/PONR" (2025, Born Losers)
