= Shadow Offering =

Studio album by Braids
- Released: June 19, 2020
- Length: 45:10
- Label: Secret City
- Producer: Chris Walla

Braids chronology
Deep in the Iris (2015)	Shadow Offering (2020)	Euphoric Recall (2023)

Singles from Shadow Offering
- 1. "Eclipse" Released: November 21, 2019; 2. "Young Buck" Released: January 31, 2020; 3. "Just Let Me" Released: April 30, 2020

Shadow Offering is the fourth studio album by Canadian experimental pop/art rock band Braids. It was originally slated to be released on April 24, 2020, but was delayed to June 19 of that year due to the COVID-19 pandemic.

The album was produced by former Death Cab for Cutie guitarist Chris Walla.

== Critical reception ==
Professional ratings
Aggregate scores
Source	Rating
Metacritic	77/100
Review scores
Source	Rating
AllMusic	4/5 stars
Clash	8/10
Exclaim!	7/10
The Line of Best Fit	9/10
Loud and Quiet	7/10
MusicOMH	3.5/5 stars
NME	3/5 stars
Under the Radar	8.5/10

Shadow Offering was met with generally favorable reviews from critics. At Metacritic, which assigns a weighted average rating out of 100 to reviews from mainstream publications, this release received an average score of 78, based on 13 reviews. Aggregator Album of the Year gave the album 75 out of 100 based on a critical consensus of 15 reviews.

== Accolades ==
Accolades for Shadow Offering
Publication	Accolade	Rank	Ref.
Stereogum	Stereogum's 50 Best Albums of 2020 – Mid-Year	28	
Under the Radar	Under the Radar's Top 100 Albums of 2020	24	

== Track listing ==
Shadow Offering track listing
No.	Title	Length
1.	"Here 4 U"	3:51
2.	"Young Buck"	3:53
3.	"Eclipse"	4:56
4.	"Just Let Me"	5:15
5.	"Upheaval II"	5:03
6.	"Fear of Men"	4:30
7.	"Snow Angel"	9:00
8.	"Ocean"	3:49
9.	"Note to Self"	4:29
