= Set Pieces =

EP by Braids
- Released: July 2008
- Genre: Electronic, art rock, dream pop, indietronica

"Set Pieces" is the first EP release by Canadian indie band Braids. The EP was released in 2008 under the band's original name, The Neighbourhood Council.

== Recording ==
The EP was recorded at CJSW in Calgary, Canada in April 2008.

== Track listing ==
All tracks are written by Braids.

No.	Title	Length
1.	"Liver and Tan"	9:16
2.	"She Brave Soul"	4:56
3.	"Chaos and the Dark"	7:46
4.	"Marlin"	7:50
5.	"Vendevel"	3:00
