= Chad VanGaalen =

Canadian musician, animator, and artist

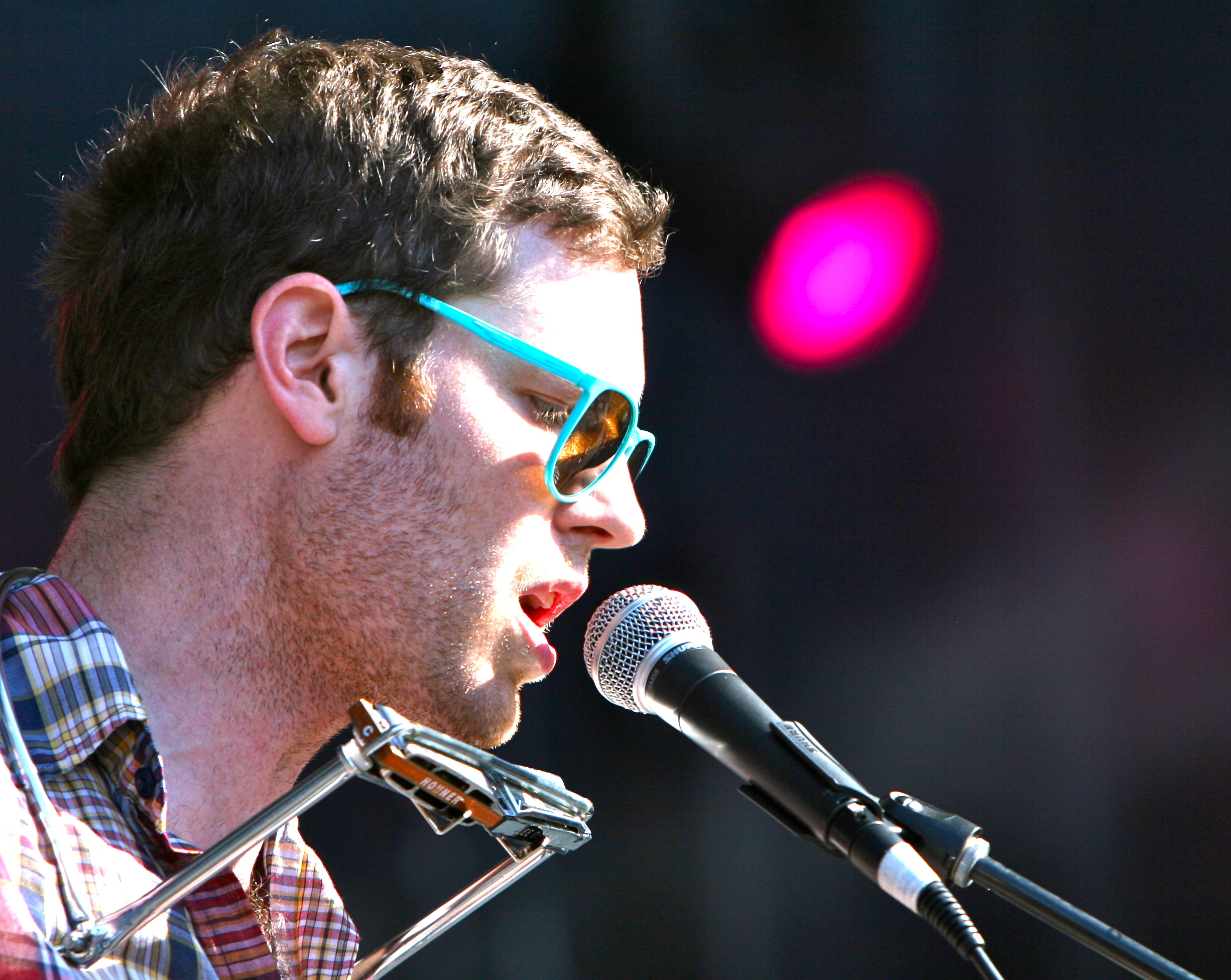
- VanGaalen at the Primavera Sound festival in 2009

Background information
- Also known as: Black Mold
- Born: 1977 (age 48–49); Calgary, Alberta, Canada
- Genres: Indie rock, folk, electronic
- Instruments: Guitar, drums, keyboards, harmonica
- Years active: 2001–present
- Labels: Flemish Eye, Sub Pop
- Website: chadvangaalen.com

Chad VanGaalen (born 1977) is a Canadian musician, animator, and artist from Calgary, Alberta.

== Career ==
=== Infiniheart ===
Following a few scattered independent releases, mostly on homemade CDs with hand-drawn art, VanGaalen released Infiniheart (2004) on Canadian independent label Flemish Eye. Infiniheart, a collection of songs selected from recordings made in his bedroom/makeshift studio, was picked up in 2005 by indie label Sub Pop. In late 2005, the album was re-released with a bonus six-song EP, entitled Green Beans.

=== Skelliconnection ===
On 22 August 2006, VanGaalen's second album, Skelliconnection, was released in the U.S. on Sub Pop and in Canada on Flemish Eye. The album is composed of new songs as well as tracks previously released on his earlier independent recordings and features exclusive artwork and videos made by VanGaalen.

ChartAttack reported on 17 January 2007 that Skelliconnection was #31 and had been on the chart for 19 weeks.

Skelliconnection was named to shortlist on 10 July 2007 for the 2007 Polaris Music Prize. The winner was announced at a gala ceremony on 24 September 2007, with the prize going to the band Patrick Watson.

=== Soft Airplane ===
VanGaalen's third studio album, Soft Airplane, was released 9 September 2008. Soft Airplane marked a significant change for Vangaalen's songwriting as, unlike his previous releases, where songs were collected from a vast catalogue of previous home recordings, Soft Airplane was written within the two-year time span since Skelliconnection.

Soft Airplane garnered many favourable reviews internationally. It was both nominated for a Canadian Juno Award for Alternative Album of the Year and shortlisted for the 2009 Polaris Music Prize. Furthermore, the album maintained a #2 placement in Exclaim!'s Top Albums of 2008 and, upon release, spent 22 weeks on !earshot's Top 50.

Vangaalen toured Soft Airplane extensively, performing live dates throughout North America, Europe, and the UK throughout 2008 and 2009. Vangaalen opted to tour with Flemish Eye label mates Women for many of his performances, allowing him to utilize certain bandmembers as his backing band.

In September 2009, to celebrate the success of Soft Airplane, Vangaalen released an accessory EP for free download.

VanGaalen's song "Rabid Bits of Time" from the Soft Airplane release was featured in the trailer for the 2011 indie film Norman, and the song "Bare Feet on Wet Griptape" was featured on the skateboarding video game Skate 3.

=== Black Mold ===
On 11 August 2009, VanGaalen released a full-length album Snow Blindness is Crystal Antz under the alias Black Mold.

=== Live shows ===
VanGaalen is sometimes assisted live by Matt Flegel and Scott "Monty" Munro, both of the post-punk band Preoccupations, and drummer Eric Hamelin from No More Shapes.

=== Other activities ===
In 2008, VanGaalen recorded the debut album of Women as well as their second album.

VanGaalen is also an illustrator and animator, and has made his own album artwork and animated music videos to accompany several of his songs, including "Clinically Dead", "Flower Gardens", "Red Hot Drops", and "Molten Light", as well as the Love as Laughter song "Dirty Lives" and Timber Timbre's song "Beat the Drum Slowly". He won the Prism Prize in 2015 for "Beat the Drum Slowly", alongside a second nomination for the video for his own single "Monster". His video for "Samurai Sword" from his 2021 release, World's Most Stressed Out Gardener featured some of his father's artwork in the background to some scenes.

He has also designed album covers for other artists, including Shout Out Out Out Out's Not Saying/Just Saying.

In 2015, VanGaalen collaborated with Seth Smith of the indie rock band Dog Day on the album Seed of Dorzon.

Chad VanGaalen's Light Information, his sixth record on Sub Pop, was released on 8 September 2017.

In 2023, he performed a new original live score to the 1923 silent film The Hunchback of Notre Dame at a 100th anniversary screening of the film as part of the 2023 Calgary International Film Festival.

In 2025, he released several unpublicized new albums to Bandcamp under the pseudonym Full Moon Bummer.

== Discography ==
Studio albums

- 2004: Infiniheart
- 2006: Skelliconnection
- 2008: Soft Airplane
- 2011: Diaper Island
- 2014: Shrink Dust
- 2017: Light Information
- 2020: Lost Harmonies
- 2021: World's Most Stressed Out Gardener

EPs

- 2005: Green Beans
- 2006: Skelliconnection
- 2009: Soft Airplane: B-Sides
- 2011: Your Tan Looks Supernatural

Collaboration albums

- 2012: Green Corridor Series #02 (with Xiu Xiu)

Black Mold

- 2009: Snow Blindness Is Crystal Antz

Full Moon Bummer

- 2021: Full Moon Bummer
- 2024: Full Moon Bummer Vol. 2
- 2025: First Night of Summer
- 2025: A Scent of a Mountain
- 2026: Exposed Assets

Peace Museum

- 2025: Peace Museum, Vol. 1: The Bleachwipes
- 2025: Peace Museum, Vol. 2: Chad Responds to Chik
- 2026: Peace Museum, Vol. 3
