= Flemish Eye =

Canadian record label based in Calgary, Alberta, Canada

- Founded: 2003; 23 years ago
- Location: Calgary, AB
- Official website: flemisheye.com

Flemish Eye is a record label started in 2003 in Calgary, Alberta, Canada by Ian Russell. The first release was Infiniheart by Chad VanGaalen, which was picked up in 2005 by indie label Sub Pop. From the success of Infiniheart, the label has earnestly developed a mandate of assisting Calgary-based musicians and artists. Through the release of Women's self-titled album, the label has also developed a working relationship with Bloomington, Indiana-based independent label Jagjaguwar. The label was referred to by CMJ New Music Monthly as a "micro-indie."

The name Flemish Eye originates from the type of fishing knot by this name, used when attaching hooks, rings and swivels to wire, but can also be used to rig a loop on heavy mono line.

== Artists ==
- Preoccupations
- Chad VanGaalen
- Blessed
- The Besnard Lakes
- Dana Gavanski
- Yves Jarvis
- N0V3L

== Alumni artists ==
- The Avulsions
- Black Mold
- Braids
- The Cape May
- Jennifer Castle
- Ghostkeeper
- Health
- Women

== Discography ==
- 046: Chad VanGaalen : World's Most Stressed Out Gardener (CD/LP)
- 045: The Besnard Lakes : The Besnard Lakes Are The Last of the Great Thunderstorm Warnings (CD/LP)
- 044: Blessed : iii (CD/12" EP)
- 043: Women : Rarities 2007-2010 (12" EP)
- 042: Yves Jarvis : Sundry Rock Song Stock (CD/LP)
- 041: Dana Gavanski : Wind Songs (LP)
- 040: Dana Gavanski : Yesterday Is Gone (CD/LP)
- 039: Yves Jarvis : The Same But by Different Means (CD/LP)
- 038: N0V3L : NOVEL (LP)
- 037: Preoccupations : New Material (CD/LP/Tape)
- 036: The Avulsions : Expanding Program (LP)
- 035: Chad VanGaalen : Light Information (CD/LP/Tape)
- 034: Yves Jarvis : Good Will Come to You (LP)
- 033: The Avulsions/Mauno : Mauno/The Avulsions Split 7" (7" Single)
- 032: Preoccupations : Preoccupations (CD/LP)
- 031: Braids : Companion (12" EP)
- 030: Braids : Deep in the Iris (CD/LP/Digital)
- 029: Preoccupations (as Viet Cong) : Viet Cong (CD/LP/Digital)
- 028: Preoccupations : Cassette (12" EP)
- 027: Chad VanGaalen : Shrink Dust (CD/LP/Digital)
- 026: Braids : Flourish // Perish (CD/LP/Digital)
- 025: Braids : In Kind // Amends (12" EP)
- 024: Chad VanGaalen : Diaper Island (CD/LP)
- 023: Jennifer Castle : Castlemusic (CD/LP)
- 022: Braids : Native Speaker (CD/LP)
- 021: Women : Public Strain (CD/LP)
- 020: Ghostkeeper : Ghostkeeper (CD/LP)
- 019: Black Mold : Snow Blindness Is Crystal Antz (CD/LP)
- 018: Pale Air Singers : Pale Air Singers (CD)
- 017: Chad VanGaalen : Soft Airplane (CD/LP)
- 016: Women : Women (CD/LP)
- 015: Health : "Heaven" 12" Single + RMXs (12")
- 014: The Cape May : Glass Mountain Roads (CD)
- 013: Chad VanGaalen : Skelliconnection (CD/LP)
- 012: The Cape May : Central City May Rise Again (CD)
- 011: Chad VanGaalen : Infiniheart (CD/LP)

== See also ==
- List of record labels
