= 2011 in Canadian music =

This is a summary of the year 2011 in the Canadian music industry.

== Events ==
=== February ===
- February 11 – Indie rock band Immaculate Machine formally announce their breakup.

=== March ===
- March 27 – The 2011 Juno Awards, the 40th annual ceremony.

=== June ===
- June 16 – Preliminary 2011 Polaris Music Prize longlist is announced.

=== July ===
- ChartAttack, a music website published by the longtime former Canadian music magazine Chart, suspends publication.

=== August ===
- August 1 – Saskatoon band The Sheepdogs are announced as the winners of Rolling Stone's "Do You Wanna Be a Rock & Roll Star" competition for unsigned rock bands.

=== September ===
- September 19 – Arcade Fire are announced as the winners of the 2011 Polaris Music Prize for their album The Suburbs.

=== November ===
- November 1 – Canadian entertainment news website andPOP acquires ChartAttack, announcing plans to revive it with expanded video content.

== Bands reformed ==
- Death from Above 1979

== Bands on hiatus ==
- Secret and Whisper
- Wolf Parade
- You Say Party

== Bands disbanded ==
- Alexisonfire
- Immaculate Machine
- Mobile
- Quo Vadis
- The Stills

== Albums released ==
=== A ===
- Adam and the Amethysts, Flickering Flashlight
- Arkells, Michigan Left – October 18
- Jann Arden, Uncover Me 2
- Armistice, Armistice – February 15
- Austra, Feel It Break

=== B ===
- Jason Bajada, The Sound Your Life Makes
- Jill Barber, Mischievous Moon – April 5
- Justin Bieber, Under The Mistletoe
- Matthew Barber, Matthew Barber
- The Barr Brothers, The Barr Brothers
- Bernice, What Was That
- The Besnard Lakes, You Lived in the City
- Blackie and the Rodeo Kings, Kings and Queens
- Braids, Native Speaker – January 18
- Les Breastfeeders, Dans la gueule des jours
- Michael Jerome Browne, The Road Is Dark
- Michael Bublé, Christmas
- Bruce Peninsula, Open Flames
- Buck 65, 20 Odd Years – February 1
- T. Buckley, Roll On
- The Burning Hell, Flux Capacitor
- Louise Burns, Mellow Drama

=== C ===
- Kathryn Calder, Bright and Vivid – October 25
- Jennifer Castle, Castlemusic
- Cannon Bros., Firecracker/Cloudglow
- Lou Canon, Lou Canon – May 10
- George Canyon, Better Be Home Soon
- Keshia Chanté, Night & Day – November 8
- City and Colour, Little Hell – June 7
- Code Pie, Love Meets Rage
- Cœur de pirate, Blonde – November 8
- Antoine Corriveau, Saint-Maurice/Logan
- Cowboy Junkies, Demons – February 15
- Jim Cuddy, Skyscraper Soul – September 27
- Cuff the Duke, Morning Comes – October 4
- Isabelle Cyr and Yves Marchand, Pays d'abondance

=== D ===
- The Dardanelles, The Eastern Light
- David Suzuki Foundation, Playlist for the Planet – March 22
- Mark Davis, Eliminate the Toxins
- The Dears, Degeneration Street – February 15
- The Deep Dark Woods, The Place I Left Behind – August 2
- Destroyer, Kaputt – January 25
- Dinosaur Bones, My Divider
- Dog Day, Deformer
- Drake, Take Care – November 15
- D-Sisive, Jonestown 2: Jimmy Go Bye Bye
- Duchess Says, In a Fung Day T!

=== E ===
- Fred Eaglesmith, 6 Volts
- Elliott Brood, Days Into Years – September 27
- Emerson Drive, Decade of Drive – February 8
- Matt Epp and the Amorian Assembly, At Dawn – April 12

=== F ===
- Feist, Metals – October 4
- Christine Fellows, Femmes de chez nous – February 1

=== G ===
- Galaxie, Tigre et diésel
- Gatineau, Karaoke king
- The Golden Seals, Increase the Sweetness
- Jenn Grant, Honeymoon Punch – January 7
- Great Aunt Ida, Nuclearize Me
- Grey Kingdom, Eulogy of Her and Her and Her
- Emm Gryner, Northern Gospel

=== H ===
- Handsome Furs, Sound Kapital – June 28
- Ron Hawkins, Straitjacket Love
- Hey Rosetta!, Seeds – February 15
- Rebekah Higgs, Odd Fellowship
- Hooded Fang, Tosta Mista

=== I ===
- Imaginary Cities, Temporary Resident
- Brandon Isaak, Bluesman's Plea

=== J ===
- Jorane, Une Sorcière comme les autres
- Junior Boys, It's All True

=== K ===
- Kellarissa, Moon of Neptune – March 29
- Koriass, Petites victoires
- K-os, Muchmusic Presents: K-os Live – October 4

=== L ===
- Avril Lavigne, Goodbye Lullaby – March 8
- Salomé Leclerc, Sous les arbres
- Library Voices, Summer of Lust
- Lights, Siberia – October 4
- Little Scream, The Golden Record – March 15
- Rob Lutes and Rob MacDonald, Live
- The Luyas, Too Beautiful to Work – February 22

=== M ===
- Catherine MacLellan, Silhouette
- Madison Violet, The Good in Goodbye
- The Mahones, The Black Irish
- Catherine Major, Le désert des solitudes
- Kate Maki, Moonshine – May 24
- Kate Maki and Frederick Squire, Calling It Quits/Crazy Tropical Survival Guide – March 22
- Malajube, La Caverne – April 19
- Dan Mangan, Oh Fortune – September 27
- Jon McKiel, Confidence Lodge (March); Tonka War Cloud (October)
- Memphis, Here Comes a City - March 8
- Patrice Michaud, Le Triangle des Bermudes
- Millimetrik, Around You; Influences
- Miracle Fortress, Was I the Wave?
- Monogrenade, Tantale
- Katie Moore, Montebello – February 1
- The Most Serene Republic, Pre Serene: Thee Oneironauts
- Mother Mother, Eureka – March 15
- Krista Muir, Between Atoms

=== N ===
- New Country Rehab, New Country Rehab – January 11
- Nickelback, Here and Now

=== O ===
- Oh Susanna, Soon the Birds – April 19
- Ohbijou, Metal Meets – September 27
- Sea Oleena, Sleeplessness
- One Hundred Dollars, Songs of Man
- Lindi Ortega, Little Red Boots
- Karim Ouellet, Plume

=== P ===
- The Pack A.D., Unpersons
- Papermaps, Papermaps
- Joel Plaskett, EMERGENCYs, false alarms, shipwrecks, castaways, fragile creatures, special features, demons and demonstrations

=== R ===
- Rattlesnake Choir, Walkin' the Wire
- Lee Reed, Emergency Broadcast
- Amanda Rheaume, Light of Another Day
- Robbie Robertson, How to Become Clairvoyant – April 5
- JF Robitaille, Calendar
- Daniel Romano, Sleep Beneath the Willow – April 5
- The Rural Alberta Advantage, Departing – March 1

=== S ===
- Sam Roberts Band, Collider – May 10
- Sarahmée, Retox
- SATE, (S)cream
- Ron Sexsmith, Long Player Late Bloomer – March 1
- Shotgun Jimmie, Transistor Sister
- Silverstein, Rescue – April 26
- Simple Plan, Get Your Heart On! – June 17
- Sloan, The Double Cross
- Snailhouse, Sentimental Gentleman – May 24
- Socalled, Sleepover – May 3
- Samantha Savage Smith, Tough Cookie
- John Southworth, Spiritual War Cassette Tape
- Spring Breakup, It's Not You, it's Me
- Frederick Squire, Frederick Squire Sings Shenandoah and Other Popular Hits – May 24
- Stars, The Bedroom Demos
- Colin Stetson, New History Warfare Vol. 2: Judges
- Jeffery Straker, under the soles of my shoes
- Sum 41, Screaming Bloody Murder – March 29
- Sunparlour Players, Us Little Devils – October 18
- Sweatshop Union, The Bill Murray EP – March 1

=== T ===
- Tasseomancy, Ulalume – August 30
- Theory of a Deadman, The Truth Is... - July 12
- Thus Owls, Harbours
- Timber Timbre, Creep on Creepin' On – April 5
- Tire le coyote, Le Fleuve en huile
- The Trews, Hope & Ruin – April 12
- Al Tuck, Under Your Shadow
- Kreesha Turner, Tropic Electric – November 15

=== V ===
- Chad VanGaalen, Diaper Island – May 17
- Various Artists, Have Not Been the Same – Vol. 1: Too Cool to Live, Too Smart to Die – November 15

=== W ===
- The Wailin' Jennys, Bright Morning Stars
- Bry Webb, Provider – November 15
- Whitehorse (Luke Doucet and Melissa McClelland), Whitehorse – August 30
- Graham Wright, Shirts vs. Skins

=== Y ===
- Ken Yates, The Backseat EP
- Young Galaxy, Shapeshifting – February 8

== Top hits on record ==
=== Top 10 American albums ===
Rank	Artist	Album	Peak position	Sales	Certification
1	Lady Gaga	Born This Way	1	246,800	3× Platinum
2	The Black Keys	El Camino	3	240,000	3× Platinum
3	LMFAO	Sorry for Party Rocking	2	176,000	2× Platinum
4	Bad Meets Evil	Hell: The Sequel	1	88,950	TBA
5	Bob Seger	Ultimate Hits: Rock and Roll Never Forgets	TBA	80,000	Platinum
6	Britney Spears	Femme Fatale	1	80,000	Platinum
7	Foo Fighters	Wasting Light	1	80,000	Platinum
8	Foster the People	Torches	7	80,000	Platinum
9	Jay-Z and Kanye West	Watch the Throne	1	80,000	Platinum
10	Jennifer Lopez	Love?	2	80,000	Platinum

=== Top 10 British albums ===
Rank	Artist	Album	Peak position	Sales	Certification
1	Adele	21	1	1,270,000	Diamond
2	Coldplay	Mylo Xyloto	1	240,000	3× Platinum
3	Pink Floyd	Discovery	TBA	160,000	2× Platinum
4	Adele	Live at the Royal Albert Hall	TBA	100,000	Diamond
5	Florence and the Machine	Ceremonials	4	40,000	Gold
6	Radiohead	The King of Limbs	5	40,000	Gold
7	Susan Boyle	Someone to Watch Over Me	6	40,000	Gold
8	George Harrison	George Harrison: Living in the Material World	TBA	20,000	2× Platinum
9	Jeff Beck	Rock 'n' Roll Party (Honoring Les Paul)	TBA	10,000	Platinum
10	Amy Winehouse	Lioness: Hidden Treasures	5	TBA	TBA

=== Top 10 International albums ===
Rank	Artist	Album	Peak position	Sales	Certification
1	David Guetta	Nothing but the Beat	2	160,000	2× Platinum
2	Il Divo	Wicked Game	11	40,000	Gold
3	Rihanna	Talk That Talk	3	30,000	TBA
4	Various Artists	Songs for Japan	3	8,000	TBA
5	Seether	Holding Onto Strings Better Left to Fray	3	5,000	TBA
6	The Script	Science & Faith	6	TBA	TBA
7	Tiësto	Club Life: Volume One Las Vegas	7	TBA	TBA
8	Andrea Bocelli	Concerto: One Night in Central Park	16	TBA	TBA
9	Chickenfoot	Chickenfoot III	19	TBA	TBA
10	Lykke Li	Wounded Rhymes	19	TBA	TBA

=== Top 10 Singles ===
Rank	Artist	Song	Album	Peak position	Sales	Certification
1	Maroon 5 featuring Christina Aguilera	"Moves like Jagger"	Hands All Over	1	640,000	8× Platinum
2	Gotye featuring Kimbra	"Somebody That I Used to Know"	Making Mirrors	1	639,000	TBA
3	Adele	"Someone like You"	21	2	560,000	7× Platinum
4	fun. featuring Janelle Monáe	"We Are Young"	Some Nights	1	560,000	7× Platinum
5	Pitbull featuring Ne-Yo, Afrojack and Nayer	"Give Me Everything"	Planet Pit	1	560,000	7× Platinum
6	Macklemore & Ryan Lewis	"Can't Hold Us"	The Heist	2	554,000	4× Platinum
7	Awolnation	"Sail"	Megalithic Symphony	48	480,000	6× Platinum
8	LMFAO featuring Lauren Bennett and GoonRock	"Party Rock Anthem"	Sorry for Party Rocking	1	480,000	6× Platinum
9	Adele	"Set Fire to the Rain"	21	2	400,000	5× Platinum
10	Flo Rida	"Good Feeling"	Wild Ones	2	400,000	5× Platinum

=== Canadian Hot 100 Year-End List ===
No.	Artist(s)	Title
1	Adele	"Rolling in the Deep"
2	LMFAO featuring Lauren Bennett and GoonRock	"Party Rock Anthem"
3	Jennifer Lopez featuring Pitbull	"On the Floor"
4	Pitbull featuring Ne-Yo, Afrojack and Nayer	"Give Me Everything"
5	Maroon 5 featuring Christina Aguilera	"Moves like Jagger"
6	Lady Gaga	"Born This Way"
7	Bruno Mars	"Grenade"
8	Katy Perry	"Firework"
9	Enrique Iglesias featuring Ludacris and DJ Frank E	"Tonight (I'm Lovin' You)"
10	Katy Perry featuring Kanye West	"E.T."
11	Martin Solveig and Dragonette	"Hello"
12	Katy Perry	"Last Friday Night (T.G.I.F.)"
13	Pink	"Fuckin' Perfect"
14	Lady Gaga	"The Edge of Glory"
15	The Black Eyed Peas	"The Time (Dirty Bit)"
16	Adele	"Someone like You"
17	Bruno Mars	"The Lazy Song"
18	Pink	"Raise Your Glass"
19	The Black Eyed Peas	"Just Can't Get Enough"
20	Rihanna	"S&M"
21	Foster the People	"Pumped Up Kicks"
22	Jessie J featuring B.o.B	"Price Tag"
23	Usher	"More"
24	Alyssa Reid	"Alone Again"
25	CeeLo Green	"Fuck You"
26	Britney Spears	"Till the World Ends"
27	Rihanna	"Only Girl (In the World)"
28	Bruno Mars	"Just the Way You Are"
29	Nicki Minaj	"Super Bass"
30	LMFAO	"Sexy and I Know It"
31	Diddy – Dirty Money featuring Skylar Grey	"Coming Home"
32	Rihanna featuring Drake	"What's My Name?"
33	Britney Spears	"I Wanna Go"
34	Edward Maya and Mia Martina	"Stereo Love"
35	Kesha	"We R Who We R"
36	OneRepublic	"Good Life"
37	Simple Plan featuring Natasha Bedingfield	"Jet Lag"
38	David Guetta featuring Flo Rida and Nicki Minaj	"Where Them Girls At"
39	Taio Cruz	"Dynamite"
40	Bad Meets Evil featuring Bruno Mars	"Lighters"
41	Pitbull featuring T-Pain	"Hey Baby (Drop It to the Floor)"
42	Cobra Starship featuring Sabi	"You Make Me Feel..."
43	Rihanna featuring Calvin Harris	"We Found Love"
44	Chris Brown	"Yeah 3x"
45	Fefe Dobson	"Stuttering"
46	Usher featuring Pitbull	"DJ Got Us Fallin' in Love"
47	David Guetta featuring Usher	"Without You"
48	Selena Gomez & the Scene	"Love You like a Love Song"
49	Nelly	"Just a Dream"
50	Britney Spears	"Hold It Against Me"
51	Dr. Dre featuring Eminem and Skylar Grey	"I Need a Doctor"
52	Anjulie	"Brand New Bitch"
53	Jason Derulo	"Don't Wanna Go Home"
54	Gym Class Heroes featuring Adam Levine	"Stereo Hearts"
55	Lady Antebellum	"Just a Kiss"
56	Pitbull featuring Marc Anthony	"Rain Over Me"
57	Kesha	"Blow"
58	Taio Cruz featuring Kylie Minogue	"Higher"
59	Shawn Desman	"Electric"
60	Wiz Khalifa	"Black and Yellow"
61	Katy Perry	"Teenage Dream"
62	Enrique Iglesias with Usher featuring Lil Wayne	"Dirty Dancer"
63	Avril Lavigne	"What the Hell"
64	Kristina Maria	"Let's Play"
65	Lady Gaga	"You and I"
66	Rihanna	"Cheers (Drink to That)"
67	Karl Wolf featuring Kardinal Offishall	"Ghetto Love"
68	Tinie Tempah featuring Eric Turner	"Written in the Stars"
69	Hedley	"Invincible"
70	Bruno Mars	"Marry You"
71	David Guetta featuring Rihanna	"Who's That Chick?"
72	Hot Chelle Rae	"Tonight Tonight"
73	Lady Gaga	"Judas"
74	Mia Martina	"Latin Moon"
75	Flo Rida	"Good Feeling"
76	Fefe Dobson	"Can't Breathe"
77	Flo Rida featuring David Guetta	"Club Can't Handle Me"
78	Christina Perri	"Jar of Hearts"
79	Far East Movement featuring Ryan Tedder	"Rocketeer"
80	JRDN	"Like Magic"
81	Marianas Trench	"Haven't Had Enough"
82	Far East Movement featuring The Cataracs and Dev	"Like a G6"
83	Lil Wayne	"How to Love"
84	Chris Brown featuring Benny Benassi	"Beautiful People"
85	Alexandra Stan	"Mr. Saxobeat"
86	Dev	"In the Dark"
87	Lupe Fiasco	"The Show Goes On"
88	Coldplay	"Every Teardrop Is a Waterfall"
89	Neverest	"About Us"
90	Rihanna	"California King Bed"
91	Selena Gomez & the Scene	"Who Says"
92	Nicki Minaj featuring Drake	"Moment 4 Life"
93	Yolanda Be Cool and DCUP	"We No Speak Americano"
94	Raghav	"Fire"
95	These Kids Wear Crowns	"I Wanna Dance with Somebody (Who Loves Me)"
96	Enrique Iglesias featuring Pitbull	"I Like It"
97	Mohombi	"Bumpy Ride"
98	Snoop Dogg vs. David Guetta	"Sweat"
99	Kelly Clarkson	"Mr. Know It All"
100	Down with Webster	"She's Dope"

== Deaths ==
- January 18 – Antonín Kubálek, classical pianist
- February 11 – Bad News Brown, 33, rapper and harmonica player
- March 22 – Victor Bouchard, pianist and composer
- April 6 – John Bottomley, singer-songwriter
- May 13 – Jack Richardson, record producer
- May 28 – Alys Robi, jazz singer
- June 9 – Claude Léveillée, 78, composer and chansonnier
- June 23 – Gaye Delorme, guitarist
- July 10 – Pierrette Alarie, opera singer
- August 7 – Jiří Traxler, jazz pianist
- December 22 – David Gold, heavy metal singer (Woods of Ypres)

== See also ==
- 2010s in music
- 2011 in Canadian television

Preceded by 2010 in Canadian music	Canadian music 2011	Succeeded by 2012 in Canadian music
