= CBC Radio 3 Sessions =

Canadian radio program

CBC Radio 3 Sessions is a Canadian radio program, which airs on the satellite radio network CBC Radio 3. Hosted by Tariq Hussain, the program airs in-studio sessions by Canadian musicians in the Radio 3 studios, including both live song performances and interview segments. Two artists are profiled in each episode, each of which performs for half an hour.

Some of the sessions predate Radio 3's presence as a radio network, dating back to its time as a webcast provider. One of its projects during that era was Just Concerts, a website which aired both studio sessions and recordings of regular concerts. The studio sessions began to air as a radio program in February 2007.

The program airs at 11 a.m. PT (2 p.m. ET) on Saturdays, midnight PT (3 a.m. ET) on Sundays and 4 a.m. PT (7 a.m. ET) on Mondays. For the first four episodes, the Sunday time slot was also part of the network's simulcast on CBC Radio 2. The program is also available as streaming audio from CBC Radio 3's website, and has also aired as a television series on the CBC's digital bold network.

== Podcast ==
On September 12, 2007, CBC Radio 3 introduced the CBC Radio 3 Sessions podcast, which allows anyone to download the program onto their computer or digital audio player. Each podcast session features a single artist.

== Sirius Satellite Sessions Episodes ==
1. Shout Out Out Out Out, We Are Wolves
2. Hot Hot Heat, Shapes and Sizes
3. Destroyer, The FemBots
4. Jason Collett, Christine Fellows
5. Dragon Fli Empire, The Phonograff
6. Immaculate Machine, The Meligrove Band
7. Joel Plaskett, Cuff the Duke
8. Shotgun & Jaybird, Blood Meridian
9. Tokyo Police Club, You Say Party! We Say Die!
10. The Acorn, Precious Fathers
11. The Flatliners, The Black Halos
12. Vailhalen, The Blood Lines
13. The Inflation Kills, Sylvie
14. Malajube, Novillero
15. Les Georges Leningrad, They Shoot Horses, Don't They?
16. Pony Up, The Hot Springs
17. The Sadies, The Buttless Chaps
18. Wintersleep, Bend Sinister
19. Pride Tiger, Raising the Fawn
20. The Constantines, Ladyhawk
21. Hylozoists, The Old Soul
22. Matt Mays, Matthew Barber
23. The Golden Dogs, Two Hours Traffic
24. Jill Barber, Amy Millan
25. Henri Fabergé and the Adorables, The Bicycles
26. Champion, Telefuzz

== Podcast Sessions Episodes ==
Date	Artist
September 12, 2007	Matt Mays
September 19, 2007	Hot Hot Heat
September 26, 2007	Immaculate Machine
October 3, 2007	Malajube
October 10, 2007	Shout Out Out Out Out
October 17, 2007	Wintersleep

== See also ==
- Bold Concert Series
- East Coast Sessions
