= CHMA-FM =

Radio station in Sackville, New Brunswick

Coordinates: 45°53′54.88″N 64°22′24.27″W

CHMA
- Sackville, New Brunswick; Canada
- Frequency: 106.9 MHz
- Branding: Voice of the Marshes

Programming
- Format: Campus radio

Ownership
- Owner: Attic Broadcasting Co. Ltd.

History
- First air date: 1974
- Call sign meaning: Mount Allison

Technical information
- Class: LP
- ERP: 50 watts
- HAAT: 51 metres (167 ft)

Links
- Website: www.chmafm.com

CHMA is a radio station broadcasting at 106.9 MHz in Sackville, New Brunswick, Canada. It is a campus/community station functioning as the campus radio station of Mount Allison University and the community radio station of Sackville, New Brunswick.

== History ==
On April 10, 1975, Attic Broadcasting Co. Ltd. (Mount Allison U.) received approval to operate a new AM radio station on 670 kHz at Sackville, New Brunswick. On August 12, 1985, Attic Broadcasting received approval from the Canadian Radio-television and Telecommunications Commission (CRTC) to convert CHMA from the AM band to the FM band on 106.9 MHz. The station has been broadcasting in the community of Sackville on this 106.9 FM band since, with a variety of live and syndicated programming airing non-stop.

== About ==
Attic Broadcasting, which is the administrative body in charge of CHMA, is funded by the students at Mount Allison University through student levy and by local community members through monthly or yearly donations. The programmers and board of directors consist of volunteers from the university and surrounding community. Day-to-day organizational and administrative operations are supervised by a permanent executive director, station manager, and programming director. In addition, CHMA has many volunteers consisting of university students and local community members who have live radio shows, podcasts, or are day-to-day hosts.

CHMA also has an in-house radio news team which produces content for the station. These local journalists, who are funded through grants, produce news segments and briefs for the radio, in addition to website stories. The station had a Tantramar Report, airing for around five years, being one of the only local news sources in the region, before being re-configured in 2025.

Some notable past programmers include CBC broadcasters Ian Hanomansing and Khalil Akhtar, as well as indie musicians Julie Doiron and Shotgun Jimmie. CHMA airs the popular syndicated programme, Democracy Now! every weekday.

== Charts ==
CHMA maintains a Top 30 music chart.

== Stereophonic Music Festival ==
CHMA-FM once was the primary organizer of an annual music festival called Stereophonic. There has not been another instance of the festival since the COVID-19 pandemic. The festival was dedicated to promoting local talent and volunteerism on all levels. Notable past performers include: Shotgun & Jaybird, Shotgun Jimmie, Frederick Squire, Al Tuck, Julie Doiron, Two Hours Traffic, Wintersleep, Plants and Animals, Woodhands, Baby Eagle, Rock Plaza Central, Tom Fun Orchestra, Jon-Rae Fletcher, Old Man Luedecke, Windom Earle, Ninja High School and many others.
