= Henri Fabergé and the Adorables =

Canadian indie rock band

- Origin: Toronto, Ontario, Canada
- Genres: Indie rock
- Years active: 2005–present
- Members: Laura Barrett; Janderton Beauregard; Henri Fabergé; Johnny Ortved; Dana Snell; Maylee Todd; Dan Werb; Juliann Wilding
- Past members: Paul Banwatt; Matt Beckett; Mitch DeRosier; Ruhee Dewji; Niall Fynes; Steve Hamelin; Keith Hamilton; Brendan Howlett; Luke LaLonde; Randy Lee; Sara Jane McKenzie; Kelly Sue O'Connor; Andrew Scott; Drew Smith; Peter Thorne; Tom MacCammon

Henri Fabergé and the Adorables are a Canadian indie rock band formed in 2005 from Toronto, Ontario, Canada.

== History ==
Henri Fabergé and the Adorables formed in 2005 and is a musical collective including members of The Bicycles, Born Ruffians, Spitfires & Mayflowers, Woodhands, The Rural Alberta Advantage and The Meligrove Band, the Adorables most commonly consist of Henri Fabergé (Henry Fletcher), Juliann Wilding, Janderton Beauregard (Andy Lloyd), Maylee Todd, Dana Snell, Laura Barrett, Dan Werb, and Johnny Ortved. Past and occasional members include Niall Fynes, Keith Hamilton, Tom MacCammon, Luke LaLonde, Mitch DeRosier, Steve Hamelin, Andrew Scott, Brendan Howlett, Ruhee Dewji, Kelly Sue O'Connor (Mal de Mer) (Proof of Ghosts), Peter Thorne, Sara Jane McKenzie, Matt Beckett, Drew Smith, Randy Lee and Paul Banwatt.

The band released its self-titled debut album in 2006. The album was recorded by Ryan Mills at Sleepytown Sound, in Henri's living room and at The Embassy bar in Kensington Market. From 2005 until 2008, the Adorables held a residency at The Embassy in Kensington Market occurring the first Wednesday of every month. These shows became local folklore and were one of the best parties in Toronto at the time. Many Canadian bands played early shows at these events, namely: Born Ruffians, Woodhands (their 2nd show with Paul Banwatt), Maylee Todd, The Rural Alberta Advantage, and DD/MM/YYYY.

== The R3-30 ==
The single "Ventriloquist Love" reached the No. 1 spot on CBC Radio 3's The R3-30 chart on January 4, 2007, and was named one of the network's Top 94 Tracks of 2006.

The R3-30 in that era traditionally announced each week's biggest chart dropper with a descending slide whistle tone. After "Ventriloquist Love" dropped from No. 9 to No. 19 the week of January 19, 2007, resulting in use of the slide whistle, the band humorously criticized R3-30 host Craig Norris' musical abilities, challenging him to record a whole song on slide whistle. After Norris published a lighthearted apology on the CBC Radio 3 site, Fabergé subsequently released an audio retort which included three short sarcastic songs about Norris by Maylee Todd, Dan Werb, and Fabergé himself.

== Members ==
=== Current ===
- Laura Barrett
- Janderton Beauregard
- Henri Fabergé
- Johnny Ortved
- Dana Snell
- Maylee Todd
- Dan Werb
- Juliann Wilding

=== Former ===
- Paul Banwatt
- Matt Beckett
- Mitch DeRosier
- Ruhee Dewji
- Niall Fynes
- Steve Hamelin
- Keith Hamilton
- Brendan Howlett
- Chris Kettlewell
- Luke LaLonde
- Randy Lee
- Sara Jane McKenzie
- Kelly Sue O'Connor
- Andrew Scott
- Drew Smith
- Peter Thorne
- Tom MacCammon

== Discography ==
- Henri Fabergé and the Adorables (2006)

== See also ==
- Music of Canada
- Canadian rock
- List of Canadian musicians
- List of bands from Canada
- Category:Canadian musical groups
