= Frederick Squire Sings Shenandoah and Other Popular Hits =

Studio album by Frederick Squire
- Released: May 24, 2011
- Genre: Folk
- Label: Blue Fog Recordings
- Producer: Frederick Squire

Frederick Squire chronology
Calling It Quits/Crazy Tropical Survival Guide (2011)	Frederick Squire; Sings Shenandoah and Other Popular Hits (2011)	Spooky Action at a Distance (2016)

Frederick Squire Sings Shenandoah and Other Popular Hits is the second solo album by Canadian singer-songwriter Frederick Squire, released May 24, 2011 on Blue Fog Recordings.

Although the album's title implies that it is a covers album, only the album's lead track, "Shenandoah", is in fact a cover.

Critic John Terauds of the Toronto Star rated the album 3-1/2 out of 4 stars, while Brad Wheeler of The Globe and Mail gave it 3 stars out of 4. The Coast's critic listed it as one of the best albums of 2011.

== Track listing ==
1. "Shenandoah"
2. "Peaceful Valley"
3. "The Human Race Can Be a Very Nasty Animal"
4. "Every Dollar Bill Could Kill Me"
5. "All Things Past Serve to Guide You on Your Way"
6. "There's a Place That I Can Go"
7. "Lucky Number Seven"
8. "We Live Beyond"
9. "Theme from a Small Towne Movie"
