= Woodhands =

Canadian electropop band

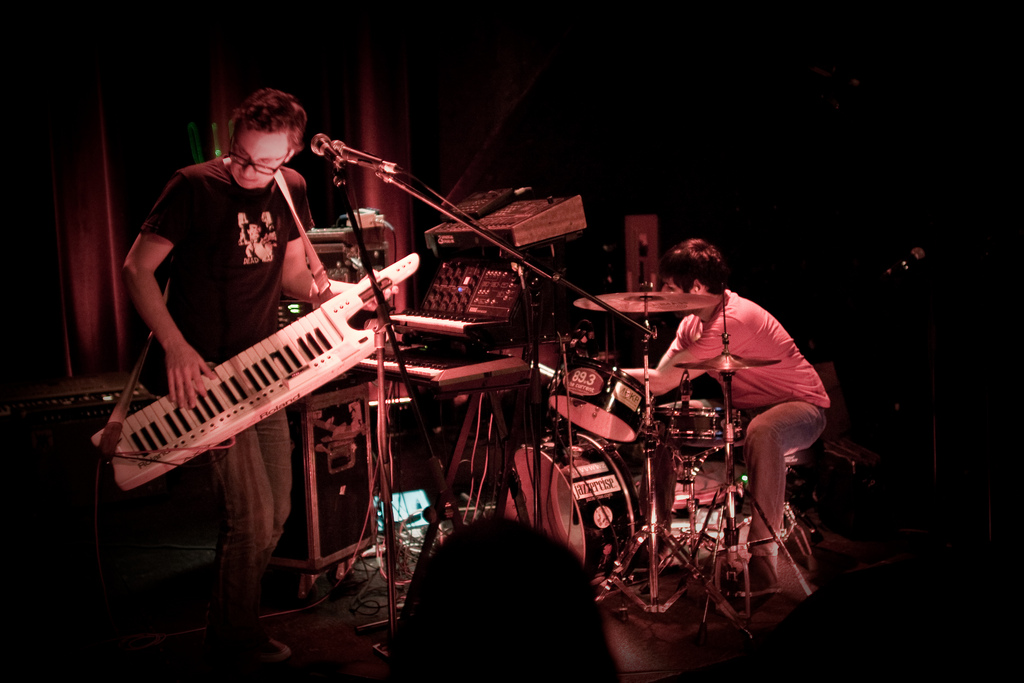
- Woodhands in 2010. From left to right: Dan Werb and Paul Banwatt.

Background information
- Origin: Toronto, Ontario, Canada
- Genres: indie rock, electronica
- Years active: 2005–present
- Label: Paper Bag Records
- Members: Paul Banwatt, Dan Werb

Woodhands is a Canadian electropop band. Based in Toronto, the band currently consists of musicians Dan Werb (synth/vocals) and Paul Banwatt (drums/vocals). They work closely with producer Roger Leavens at Boombox Sound in Toronto. Past members and guest collaborators have included Roselle Healy, Pat Placzek, Maylee Todd, Laura Barrett, Taylor Trowbridge, Chris von Szombathy, Elan Benaroch, Tyler Greentree, and Jess Conn-Potegal. In an interview, Werb said they called the band Woodhands because he "wanted to let everyone know that there was an organic element to the ambient electronic music I was making."

Werb had previously pursued different incarnations of the band in Vancouver and Montreal before meeting Banwatt through their shared membership in Henri Fabergé and the Adorables. They began playing and recording together as Woodhands in October 2006, and signed to Paper Bag Records in the fall of 2007 after playing the Pop Montreal festival.

The duo finished the recording of Heart Attack in early 2008 with producer Roger Leavens at Boombox Sound in Toronto. Heart Attack was released on Paper Bag Records on April 1, 2008. After the release of Heart Attack, Werb and Banwatt toured across Canada and internationally, including shows in China and Japan, to support the album. In reference to Heart Attack, Woodhands said in an interview: "With the album, we just wanted that immediacy of emotion and that urgency of not being able to hold something in," Werb says. "Just that sense of 'this has to be expressed' — there is no holding back."

In 2009, Woodhands took part in an interactive documentary series called City Sonic. The series, which featured 20 Toronto artists, had Dan and Paul describing an illegal outdoor show at the Don Valley Brickworks. In 2011, Werb also participated in the National Parks Project, collaborating with musicians Sebastien Grainger and Jennifer Castle, and filmmaker Catherine Martin, to produce and score a short documentary film about Mingan Archipelago National Park Reserve in Quebec.

== Discography ==
=== Albums ===
- Woodhands (2005)
- Heart Attack (2008)
- Remorsecapade (2010)

=== EPs ===
- I Wasn't Made For Fighting EP (2008)
- Dancer EP (2009)
- iTunes Live Session (2009)

=== 7"s ===
- "Can't See Straight" (2007) split with Peter Project

=== Mixtapes ===
- Remixcapade (2010)
- No Feelings (2010)
