= SappyFest =

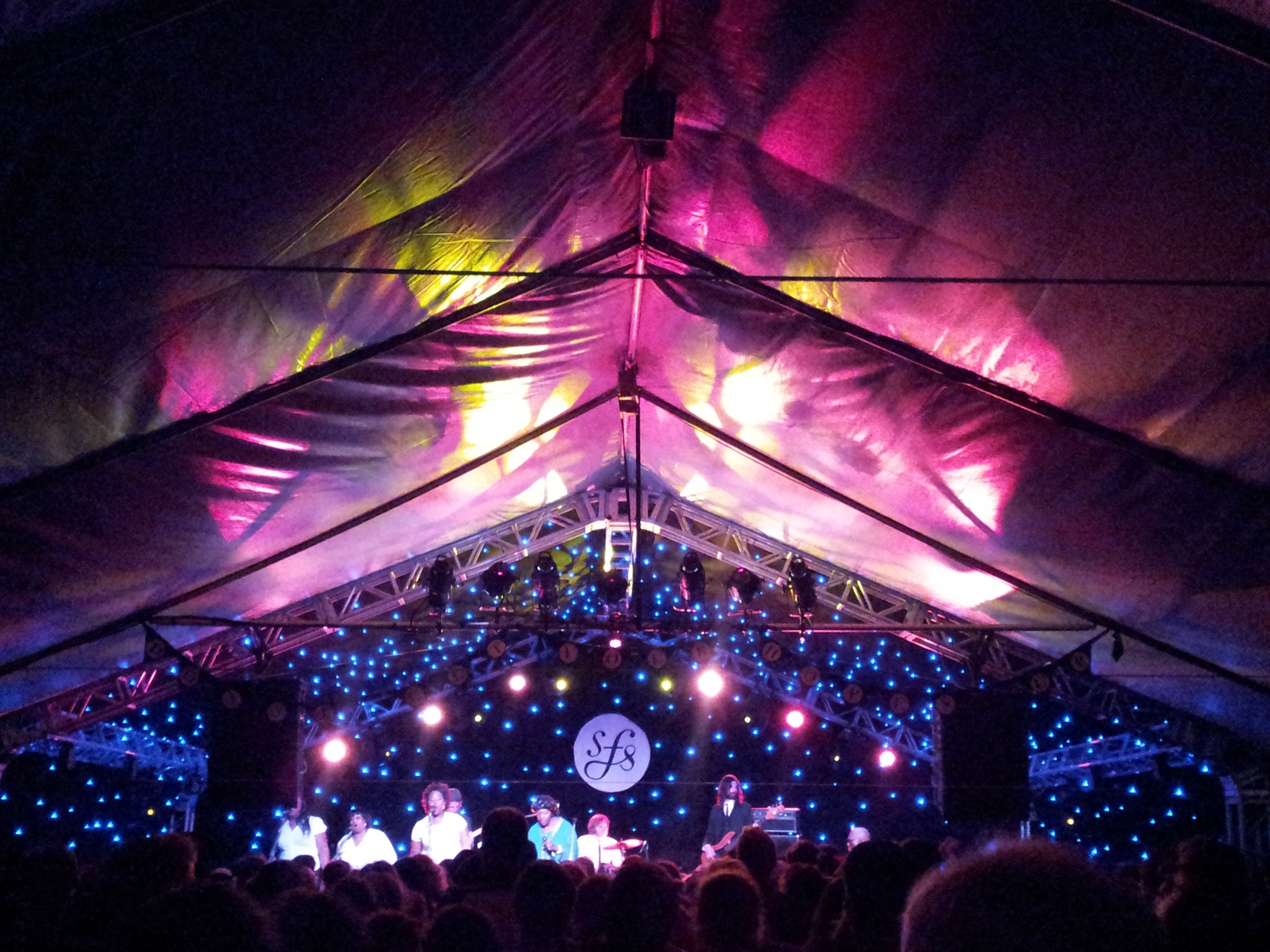
- Dates: August long weekend
- Locations: Sackville, New Brunswick, Canada
- Years active: 2006–present
- Founders: Paul Henderson, Jon Claytor, Julie Doiron
- Website: SappyFest.com

SappyFest is an annual independent arts and music festival held in Sackville, New Brunswick, Canada. Started by Paul Henderson, Jon Claytor, and musician Julie Doiron as an extension of Sappy Records, the festival launched 2006.

The festival is produced by Sappy Records in partnership with OK.Quoi?! Contemporary Arts Festival, Struts Gallery, and the Faucet Media Arts Centre. SappyFest draws musicians and audience members alike from across the continent. Many Sackville residents volunteer their time to SappyFest, either by billeting visitors, working security, taking tickets, or taking on a slew of other tasks. Steven Lambke served as Creative Director of Sappyfest, from 2017 to 2021. Andrea Vincent is the current Creative Director of Sappyfest, succeeding Steve Lambke in February 2022.

== By year ==
=== 2006 ===
Headliners for the inaugural festival were recently reformed Eric's Trip, performing two nights, August 4, and 6.

Other acts that performed that year were Al Tuck, Julie Doiron, Moonsocket, Purple Knight, In Flight Safety, Old Man Luedecke, Baby Eagle, Aiden Penner, Chad Van Gaalen, Snailhouse, We've Gone Feral, Sail Boats Are White, Yellow Jacket Avenger, Sarah Mangle, Rock Piaza Central, Abigail Lapell, Wooly Leaves, Rick White, B.A. Johnston, David Trenaman & Colleen, Windom Earle, Shotgun & Jaybird, Dave Bidini, Pundits, Colonial Quarrels, The Robins, The Peter Parkers, The Just Barelys, S.S. Cardiacs, & Singing Saws. The festival took place between August 4-6, 2006.

=== 2007 ===
Headliners included Julie Doiron, Constantines, Chad VanGaalen, and Eric's Trip from August 3–5, 2007.

=== 2008 ===
SappyFest '08 occurred on Friday 1 August 2008 – Sunday 3 August 2008. Headliners included Julie Doiron, Chad VanGaalen, The Acorn, and Miracle Fortress.

=== 2009 ===
Headliners included Eric's Trip, Wintersleep, Destroyer, Timber Timbre, Ohbijou, The Burning Hell, and Old Man Luedecke.

=== 2010 ===
The festival took place from July 30 to August 1. Performers included Attack in Black, The Sadies, Chad VanGaalen, Jim Guthrie, Old Man Luedecke, The Felice Brothers, Holy Fuck, and Gentleman Reg. On Sunday, Halifax band Sloan performed unannounced at the mainstage tent. The setlist included their album Twice Removed in its entirety, a first for the band.

=== 2011 ===
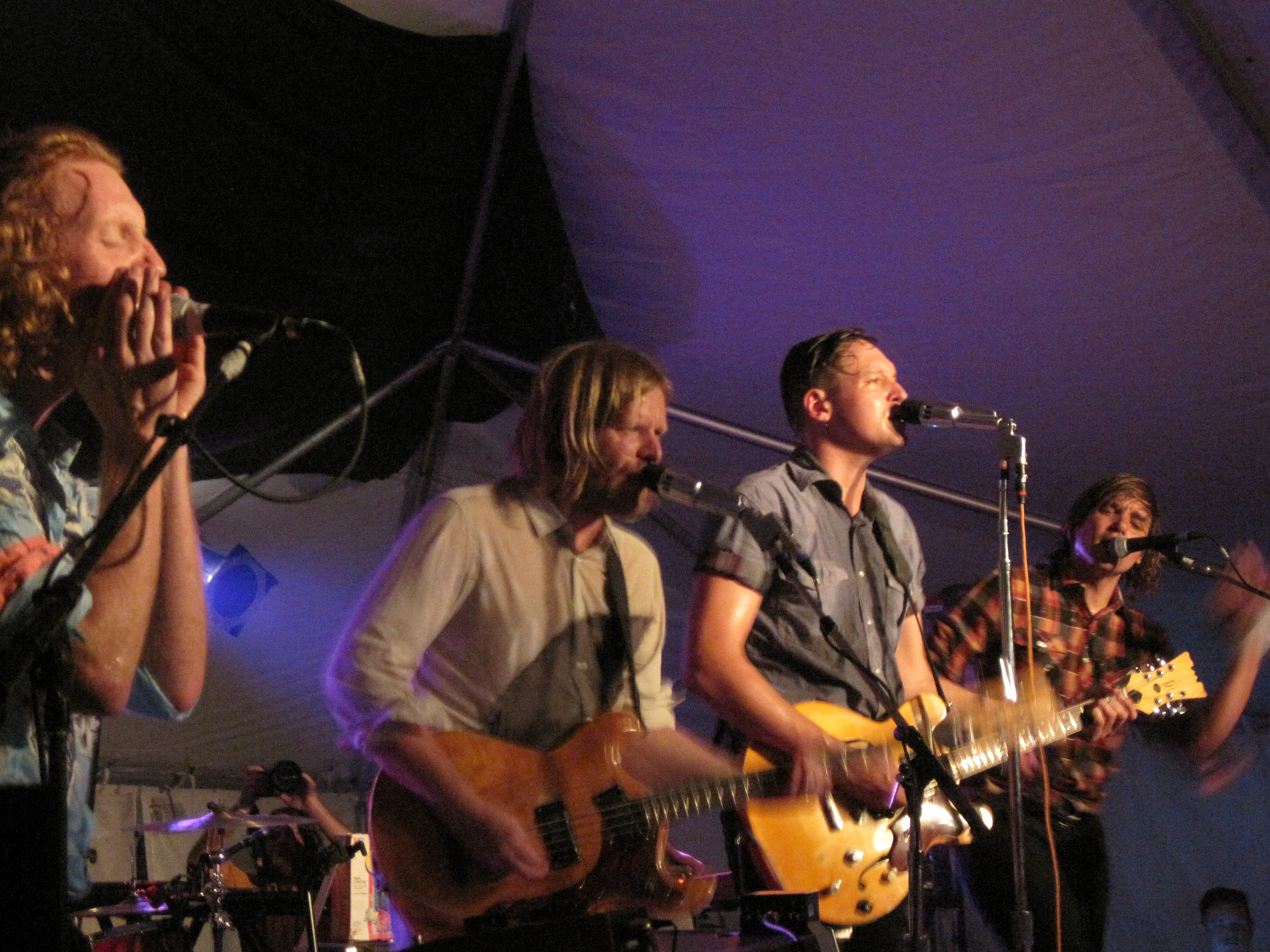
Arcade Fire at SappyFest 6

The lineup for the Sappyfest in 2011 included Rich Aucoin, Grimes, Chad VanGaalen, Charles Bradley, and a surprise show from Arcade Fire, performing under the decoy name Shark Attack.

=== 2012 ===
Headliners included Metz, Fucked up, and Thee Silver Mount Zion Memorial Orchestra and Tra La La Band

=== 2013 ===
In 2013, the festival ran a conference on presenting small music festivals in rural contexts, called "Why Nowhere?". The music line-up that year included the Joel Plaskett Emergency, Chad VanGaalen, Shotgun Jimmie, The Underachievers, Colin Stetson, Naomi Shelton & the Gospel Queens, and Pictish Trail.

=== 2014 ===
Taking place on the first weekend of August, the 2014 lineup included Ought, Basia Bulat, The Constantines, as well as Shotgun & Jaybird.

=== 2015 ===
SappyFest X was temporarily relocated to York Street due to a major reconstruction of its usual home on Bridge Street. Performers included Angel Olsen, PUP, Shotgun Jimmie, and Jennifer Castle

=== 2016 ===
Returning to the familiar setting of Bridge Street, the 2016 lineup included Cakes da Killa, TUNS, Julie Doiron and the Wooden Stars, Dilly Dally, Nap Eyes, Century Egg, Partner, and Ought.

=== 2017 ===
The 2017 lineup included Lido Pimienta, Weaves, Partner, Daniel Romano, and Willie Thrasher.

=== 2018 ===
The 2018 lineup included U.S. Girls, Jeremy Dutcher, Jennifer Castle, Leanne Betasamosake Simpson, Nap Eyes, and Bonjay

=== 2019 ===
SappyFest 14 was held August 2–4, 2019. This years lineup included: Alumette, Aquakultre, Apollo Ghosts, Barnacle, Cruising & Searing, Deliluh, Diamondtown, Fet.Nat, Flour, Gianna Lauren, Haviah Mighty, Janowskii, José Contreras, Joyfultalk, Juice Girls, Julie Aubé, Julie Doiron, Lal, Lillia, Liz Brain X Doug, Lo Siento, Mauno, Motherhood, Nyssa, Positive Body Language, Papal Visit, Shotgun Jimmie, Snotty Nose Rez Kids, Tim Baker, Tryal, The Weather Station, WHOOP-Szo, and Yves Jarvis.

=== 2020 ===
For SappyFest 15, due to the Coronavirus pandemic, a scheduled livestream was held instead of in-person live performances. Titled "SappyFest: Near And Far", it was held on July 29 - Aug 1, 2020. The 2020 lineup included: Ariel Sharratt and Mathias Kom, Bart Vautour, Colleen Collins, Emma Healey, Egyptian Cotton Arkestra, Geordie Miller, Hélène Barbier, Jennah Barry, Jon McKiel, Julie Doiron, Kate Miller, Kawama Kasutu, Klarkam Weinwurm, Kwento, Lavender Bruises, Laura Watson, Marilyn Lerch, Lido Pimienta, Patrick Allaby, Rachel Thornton, Rebecca Roher, Steven Lambke, Leanne Betasamosake Simpson, Sue Goyette, USSE, and Wares.

=== 2021 ===
SappyFest 16, due to the Covid-19 Pandemic, scheduled a livestream performance titled "SappyFest: Infinite Variety", instead of in-person performances, and broadcast live from Struts Gallery, on July 30–31, 2021. The 2021 lineup included Amy Siegel, Ariel Sharratt & Mathias Kom, Erin Bardua, Black Dimes, Brandon Hicks, Brian Neilson, Bucky Buckler, Caged Animals, Century Egg, Chris Meaney, Cluttered, Elm & Ampersand, G.L.A.M. Bats, Marilyn Lerch & Geordie Miller, Izzy Francolini & Desdemona Shaw, Jerry Ropson, Jeska Grue, John Kilpatrick, Jon McKiel, Julie Doiron, Klarka Weinwurm, Laura Watson, Lucy Koshan, Marissa Sean Cruz, Olivia McNair, Phil Mercier, Rachel M Thornton, Rebecca Blankert, Sarah Wendt & Pascal Dufaux, Theo Crocker, Wandarian, Tori Weldon and Wolf Castle.

=== 2022 ===
SappyFest 17 is scheduled to take place during July 29–31, 2022. The festival is currently looking for submissions.
