= Falling Awake =

Falling Awake can refer to:

== Music ==
- "Falling Awake", a 1998 song by The Plimsouls from Kool Trash
- "Falling Awake", a 2004 song by The Color Morale from My Devil in Your Eyes
- "Falling Awake", a 2005 song by Shpongle from Nothing Lasts... But Nothing Is Lost
- "Falling Awake", a 2006 song by Gary Jules from Gary Jules
- "Falling Awake" (song), a 2010 song by Tarja Turunen
- "Falling Awake", a 2015 song by Kaiser Chiefs
- "Falling Awake" (album), a 2016 album by Goodnight, Sunrise

== Other ==
- Falling Awake (poetry collection), a 2016 book by Alice Oswald
- Falling Awake, a 2004 romance novel by Jayne Ann Krentz
- Falling Awake (film), a 2009 American drama film
