= March 12 (album) =

Studio album by Frederick Squire
- Released: November 2, 2010
- Recorded: March 12, 2010; Sackville, New Brunswick
- Genre: Folk
- Label: Blue Fog Recordings
- Producer: Frederick Squire

Frederick Squire chronology
Daniel, Fred & Julie (2009)	March 12 (2010)	Calling It Quits/Crazy Tropical Survival Guide (2011)

March 12 is the first solo album by Canadian singer-songwriter Frederick Squire, released November 2, 2010 on Blue Fog Recordings.

The album, recorded at Squire's home studio in Sackville, New Brunswick on March 12, 2010, was originally released as a limited edition seven-song EP, sold only at Squire's live shows. It was later picked up by Blue Fog for full commercial release, with three additional songs added to the track listing.

The album was a longlisted nominee for the 2011 Polaris Music Prize.

== Track listing ==
1. "What's That Over There a Dead Rainbow?"
2. "You Sing Low and We Will Sing High"
3. "Old Times Past New Times"
4. "The Future of Tradition"
5. "Pretty Bird"
6. "It Is in the Water"
7. "We Are All the Middle Child"
8. "The Gambler Never Wins"
9. "As Long As One Sun Could Shine"
10. "Theme from a Northern Movie"
