= Shotgun & Jaybird =

Canadian rock band (2003–2007)

- Origin: Dawson City, Yukon, Canada
- Genres: Indie rock
- Years active: 2003–2007
- Label: Sappy
- Past members: Fred "Dick Morello" Squire; Jim "Shotgun Jimmie" Kilpatrick; Julie Doiron; Jesse Baird; Paul Henderson

Shotgun & Jaybird were a Canadian indie rock band formed in 2003 in Dawson City and based in Sackville, New Brunswick.

== History ==
Shotgun & Jaybird formed in mid-2003 when Frederick Squire, formerly of The Janitors, travelled to the Yukon and was later joined by his lifelong friend and former Janitor Jim Kilpatrick, from Ajax, Ontario. Within the band, Squire used the stage name "Dick Morello" and Kilpatrick used the stage name "Shotgun Jimmie". Along with Dom Lloyd, they played a weekly set at The Pit, and recorded Dawson Towne Recordings with Sandy Silver.

Following the tour, they headed back to Sackville, New Brunswick. There, they recorded and produced Sackville Classics for the Simple Ukulele. They also played the inaugural Stereophonic Music Festival, a fund raiser for CHMA-FM, the local campus-community station.

During 2004 both Kilpatrick and Squire released solo albums.

Later in 2004, Julie Doiron, known for her solo recording and work with Eric's Trip, relocated to Sackville just in time to play the second Stereophonic festival. Also that year, Shotgun & Jaybird released their eponymous wallpaper greatest hits culled from Dawson Towne Recordings, Simple Songs, 6,000 True Stories, and Rubber Covered Painter.

During this period, the duo began to play as a trio, adding Paul Henderson as a full-time drummer. Early shows with Henderson would often still consist of Morello and Jim trading guitar and drum duties, resulting in a two drum, one guitar band. Later in 2005, the trio began to back Julie Doiron in her solo efforts, and she began to play bass with them.

With the addition of Doiron, the band shifted its makeup so that both Kilpatrick and Squire played guitar. This larger, fuller sound was toyed with during the summer and fall of 2005, and in early 2006 they released the There Are Days and There Are Days EP on the resurrected Sappy Records imprint. This record featured art and layout by local artists Erik Edson and Very Silly Monkey, and collaboration with local musician W. L. Altman. The record was mastered by Toronto's Noah Mintz.

The album marked a turning point for the band, leading to their first of several cross-Canada tours, as well as their most polished record to that point. During this time, Chad VanGaalen was in Sackville as the artist in residence at faucet media arts centre, and he played several shows with Shotgun & Jaybird.

After touring to promote the EP, Henderson, Doiron and Jon Claytor set the very first Sappyfest in Sackville in motion. It was also during this time that they recorded "Trying to Get Somewhere"; released in the late summer, it has charted as high as No. 2 on the Earshot! charts. Their tour for this record, with Woolly Leaves and Julie Doiron, has been their most successful to date.

Late in 2006, Henderson amicably left the band and was replaced by Jesse Baird, who had performed formerly with Drummer, the Janitors, Leslie Feist, and Brother of Pidgeon.

It was announced that Shotgun & Jaybird broke up in May 2007, playing their final gig in Moncton, New Brunswick.

In the fall of 2007, Doiron and Squire played several shows opening for Eric's Trip, and toured Eastern-Canada with The Superfantastics as Blue Heeler, and later became known as Calm Down It's Monday. The duo released only two songs under that name, although they continued to collaborate on other releases credited as individuals, including the 2008 album Lost Wisdom with Mount Eerie and the 2009 album Daniel, Fred & Julie with Daniel Romano. Squire later released his first widely released solo album, March 12, in 2010.

Shotgun Jimmie released another solo album called The Onlys in October 2007. He has continued to pursue a solo career.

== Members ==
- Fred "Dick Morello" Squire – guitar, vocals, drums
- Jim "Shotgun Jimmie" Kilpatrick – guitar, vocals, drums
- Julie Doiron – bass guitar, vocals
- Paul Henderson – drums (2004–2006)
- Jesse Baird – drums (late 2006–2007)

== Discography ==
- Dawson Towne Recordings – 2003
- Sackville Classics For Simple Ukulele – 2004
- Shotgun & Jaybird – 2005
- There Are Days and Then There Are Days – 2006
- "Two Minutes Faster" on Volume II 7" compilation (Out of Touch Records) - 2006
- Trying to Get Somewhere – 2006
