= CHMA (disambiguation) =

CHMA may refer to:

- College Hockey Mid-America
- CFRN (AM), a radio station (1260 AM) licensed to Edmonton, Alberta, Canada, which held the call sign CHMA from 1927 to the 1930s
- CHMA-FM, a radio station (106.9 FM), licensed to Sackville, New Brunswick, Canada
