= Create/Destroy/Create =

Studio album by Goodnight, Sunrise
- Released: March 8, 2013
- Recorded: Sept–Dec 2012
- Genres: Rock; indie rock
- Length: 47:32
- Producers: David Kochberg, Chris Sampson

Goodnight, Sunrise chronology
Create/Destroy/Create (2013)	Falling Awake (2016)

Create/Destroy/Create is the debut studio album by Canadian indie-rock band Goodnight, Sunrise. It is a loose concept album divided into three movements which deal with the cyclical nature of people's lives. The album can be played in an infinite repeated loop, because it begins and ends with a ticking clock. The album artwork features an intricate ambigram design designed by Polish artist Daniel Dostal. The album had success on Canadian campus radio, charting on the Earshot Radio Chart on a number of stations.

== Track listing ==
All tracks are written by Goodnight, Sunrise.

No.	Title	Length
1.	"Love Fortress #9"	4:18
2.	"Paper Napkins"	3:22
3.	"The Honeymoon Is Over"	4:08
4.	"Wonderlust"	3:46
5.	"The Machine"	5:22
6.	"This Is Our Wanting"	7:06
7.	"8:17"	4:38
8.	"This Is Yours"	5:29
9.	"The Ocean"	9:23
Total length:		47:32

== Personnel ==
- Andrew Charters - bass, backing vocals
- David Kochberg - lead vocals, guitar
- Vanessa Vakharia - lead vocals, keyboards
- Paul Weaver - drums
- Chris Sampson - engineering, production
- Noah Mintz - mastering
- Dean Marino - guitar engineering
