= The Inflation Kills =

- Origin: Hamilton, Ontario, Canada
- Years active: 2004

The Inflation Kills (TIK) were a band from Hamilton, Ontario, featuring founding members of prominent Southern Ontario independent bands Kitchens & Bathrooms and Hoosier Poet. Members of the band were: Phil Williams (vocals/guitar), Matt Fleming (guitar), Nicholas Daleo (drums) and Adrian Murchison (bass).

== History ==
After indie-math-rockers Kitchens & Bathrooms disbanded, Williams went on to start The Inflation Kills in 2004 with the intentions of demonstrating an aesthetic shift from more complex time signatures, toward a rock and roll inspired approach, and reestablishing a long commitment to an independent approach to musical creation. The Inflation Kills had two albums. Their self-titled, debut, full-length album released through the now defunct TikTokTikTok MUSIC! collective and distributed in Canada through Sonic Unyon. Their second album, GROUNDS FOR TERMINATION, released in 2016 on bandcamp and other platforms.

Prior to playing their hometown, The Inflation Kills took the atypical approach of touring to a region where members' former bands had relative success; that is, they toured Eastern Canada and shared stages with friends Wintersleep, Contrived, Ermine and Jon Epworth. Following that initial tour, the band returned home to debut in Hamilton, Ontario, at The Underground with The Constantines. Early in the new year, the band nearly had to cancel its recording plans after the studio they were booked into was flooded by a burst pipe, but the group was able to avert crisis when the producer, Matt Talbot (HUM), was able to book studio time at Electrical Audio in Chicago, Illinois. The album was engineered by Russ Arbuthnot at Electrical Audio in Chicago, Illinois, in early 2005, and completed and produced at Great Western Record Recorders by Matt Talbot. It was mastered by Ryan Mills (Antiantenna, 20 Hz) at Joao Carvalho Mastering in Toronto, Ontario, and released on April 8, 2005. The album debuted at #44 in May 2005 on the earshot charts in Canada, dropping to 50th for the month of June 2005.

Following the release of the album, the band primarily toured Eastern Canada while making appearances at the Pop Montreal and Halifax Pop Explosion festivals, sharing stages with Dependent Music affiliated artists such as Wintersleep, Contrived, Ermine, and Jon Epworth, but also toured Nationwide. The band also has a music video for the song "When Clones Come", created by former MuchMusic producer Matt Unsworth. The band has also performed and recorded a CBC Radio 3 Live Session in the Glenn Gould Studio at CBC headquarters in Toronto, Ontario, a part of which segment reveals new music that is, as of yet, unreleased.

After The Inflation Kills went dormant, Phil Williams wrote and performed a series of acoustic fragments as a solo artist and was featured in an episode of Southern Souls' musical video series whilst performing amongst installations at the Science Centre in Toronto, Ontario. Matt Fleming studied jazz guitar in Antigonish, Nova Scotia, at St. Francis Xavier University and played in the Halifax-based band Kuato, Ottawa metal band Biipiigwan, and is currently playing bass for the Hamilton, Ontario roots rocker, and Sonic Unyon recording artist, Terra Lightfoot. Nicholas Daleo went on to play drums live and on record for Pneumatic Transit—a short-lived project started by Adrian Murchison—as well as live for Monster Truck, and Blinker the Star. Adrian Murchison toured once out east with his project, Pneumatic Transit, but the band has not performed or released any further material since.

The Inflation Kills recorded a 7-song EP in Summer 2015 at Boxcar Recording (Hamilton, Ontario) with Sean Pearson (50 Watt Head, Teevee Freaks, WTCHS). Its scheduled release is end of 2015 via a limited run of 100 green cassette tapes with gold lettering through Cold Slither Tapes (Chicago, Illinois).
