= Knows What You Need =

Studio album by Jon-Rae and the River
- Released: August 2006
- Label: We Are Busy Bodies, Baudelaire

Knows What You Need is an album released in 2006 by Jon-Rae and the River. The album was recorded and mixed at Halla Studios in Toronto, Ontario. It does not, however, feature current drummer Dave Clarke, who joined the band shortly after the recording.

== Track listing ==
1. "Roll"
2. "Ghostsong"
3. "All That I Had"
4. "Just One More"
5. "Fuck Me"
6. "Nothing to Do"
7. "When You Come Knocking"
8. "Best of My Time"
9. "Hard in the City"
10. "Eastern Immigration"
11. "Fire"

All songs written by Jon-Rae Fletcher.
