= Goodnight Sunrise =

- Origin: Toronto, Ontario, Canada
- Genres: rock; alternative rock; pop rock
- Years active: 2011–present
- Label: Rejection Records
- Members: David Kochberg; Vanessa Vakharia
- Past members: Andrew Charters; Pedro Salles; Thor Thunders; Paul Weaver; Quincy Yip
- Website: goodnightsunrise.com

Goodnight Sunrise (formerly Goodnight, Sunrise) is a Canadian alternative rock band formed in Toronto, Ontario, Canada in 2011. The band is characterized by their energetic live show, dual male-female lead vocals, and eclectic musical influences.

== History ==
Goodnight, Sunrise was formed in 2011 by David Kochberg and Vanessa Vakharia who had both played in the Toronto band The Big Deal. Along with friend and former Glueleg bassist Andrew "Chowder" Charters, they recorded their first EP Fragments as a three piece. The addition of drummer Paul Weaver in February 2012 completed the four member group, leading into festival performances at the 2012 Canadian Music Week and North by Northeast. Collectively their early writing was influenced by diverse bands such as Florence + The Machine, Muse, Metric, U2, and Foo Fighters, while the dual lead vocals of Vakharia and Kochberg were reminiscent of bands like Blink-182, Of Monsters and Men, and July Talk.

The group's first full-length album Create/Destroy/Create was released in March 2013 and co-produced by Kochberg and sound engineer Chris Sampson. The 9 song pseudo-concept album demonstrated the band's eclectic influences and drew upon cyclical themes of introspection, self-destruction, and redemption. The album artwork, an intricate ambigram design, was designed by Polish artist Daniel Dostal. Create/Destroy/Create received campus radio play across Canada throughout Summer 2013, from British Columbia to Ontario.

In December 2013, Goodnight, Sunrise followed Create/Destroy/Create with the first in a series of split-singles. Unlike most of the band's album songs in which Kochberg and Vakharia share lead vocals, the D/V series features one song by each of them (resulting in a "Side D" with David on lead and a "Side V" with Vanessa). D/V 1: Deaf Ears was recorded in Lucan, Ontario, at Swamp Songs Studios and mastered by Noah Mintz at Lacquer Channel Mastering. This was followed by D/V 2: Bridgeburner in July 2014, recorded with new bassist Thor Thunders after the amicable departure of Charters. Thunders departed at the end of 2014, and the band recruited Pedro Salles (formerly of Brazilian band Avec Tristesse). In September 2015, the band completed a 20-date tour of Eastern Canada to support the release of "Deal With It", the first single from their upcoming 2nd album. The second single, "Familiar Faces", was released in July 2016, and the September 2016 Falling Awake album release was supported by a 17-date tour across Ontario, the United Kingdom (including showcases at Indie Week Europe) and a final show in Amsterdam.

In May 2018, Goodnight, Sunrise was selected by Q107 to be the opening act for Bon Jovi at the Air Canada Centre on May 12. Weaver had amicably parted ways with the band earlier in the year but rejoined them for this momentous final show together. From this point forward the band was led by Vakharia and Kochberg and supported by a rotating cast of touring members, starting with a cross-Canada summer tour supporting their new single "Runaways" with performances at Evolve Festival, Riverfest Elora, and Dawson City Music Festival in Dawson City, Yukon. In November 2018, they released a modern pop-rock cover of Gordon Lightfoot's acoustic ballad "Song for a Winter's Night". 2019 brought their first show in the US, performing at The NAMM Show in Anaheim, California, as well as a 30-date Western Canada summer tour behind the singles "WVV" and "Don't Want It To End".

The band spent 2020–2021 writing and recording a new album with producer Brian Moncarz and featuring bassist Duncan Coutts and drummer Jason Pierce of Our Lady Peace, releasing the first single of this collaboration "Won't Be Long" in May 2021. In early 2022, ahead of the release of the next single "One Pill" from these sessions, the band officially removed the comma from its name to continue performing and recording going forward as Goodnight Sunrise.

== Band members ==
Current line-up

- David Kochberg – guitar, lead vocals (2011–present)
- Vanessa Vakharia – keytar, keyboards, lead vocals (2011–present)

Past members

- Andrew Charters – bass guitar, backing vocals (2011–2014)
- Pedro Salles – bass guitar, backing vocals (2015–2016)
- Thor Thunders – bass guitar, backing vocals (2014)
- Paul Weaver – drums (2012–2018)
- Quincy Yip – drums (2011)
- Helena McCully-backup vocals (2023)

== Discography ==
=== Albums ===
- Create/Destroy/Create (2013)
- Falling Awake (2016)
- Against All Odds (2022)
- GET A LIFE (2025)

=== EPs ===
- Fragments (2011)
- D/V 1: Deaf Ears (2013)
- D/V 2: Bridgeburner (2014)

=== Singles ===
- "Remember Now" (2017)
- "Runaways" (2018)
- "Song for a Winter's Night" (2018)
- "Catch Up" (2019)
- "Feel Good" (2019)
- "WVV" (2019)
- "Don't Want It To End" (2019)
- "Song For Sam" (2019)
- "We're Not Dead Yet" (2020)
- "Space Oddity" (2020)
- "Won't Be Long" (2021)
- "Single All The Way" / "Gimel All The Way" (2022)
- "Rockin in the Free World" (2023)
- "This Is Yours (To Make)" (2023)
