= Mended with Gold =

2014 studio album by the Rural Alberta Advantage

Studio album by The Rural Alberta Advantage
- Released: 30 October 2014
- Studio: Candle Recording, Toronto
- Genre: Indie rock, indie folk
- Length: 38:43
- Label: Paper Bag Records (CAN); Saddle Creek Records (US)
- Producer: Leon Taheny; Matt Lederman

The Rural Alberta Advantage chronology
Departing (2011)	Mended with Gold (2014)	The Wild (2017)

Professional ratings
Aggregate scores
Source	Rating
Metacritic	74/100
Review scores
Source	Rating
AllMusic	4/5 stars
Exclaim!	8/10
Paste	7.2/10

Mended with Gold is the third full-length album by Canadian indie rock band The Rural Alberta Advantage, released 30 October 2014 on Paper Bag Records in Canada and Saddle Creek Records in the United States.

== Track listing ==
No.	Title	Length
1.	"Our Love..."	2:55
2.	"This City"	2:26
3.	"On the Rocks"	3:26
4.	"Terrified"	3:04
5.	"Runners in the Night"	3:27
6.	"To Be Scared"	3:23
7.	"45/33"	3:45
8.	"All We've Ever Known"	2:48
9.	"The Build"	3:10
10.	"Vulcan, AB"	2:50
11.	"Not Love or Death"	3:34
12.	"...On the Run"	3:58

== Personnel ==
- Nils Edenloff - vocals, guitar
- Amy Cole - keyboard, bass, vocals
- Paul Banwatt - drums
- Leon Taheny - producer, mixing, recording
- Matt Lederman - producer, mixing, recording
- Joao Carvalho - mastering
- Bryan Lowe - assistant mastering
- Robyn Kotyk - artwork
- Dara Kartz - management
