= Hometowns =

2008 studio album by the Rural Alberta Advantage

Studio album by The Rural Alberta Advantage
- Released: 2008
- Genre: Indie rock
- Length: 37:26
- Label: independent (2008); Saddle Creek Records (2009)

The Rural Alberta Advantage chronology
The Rural Alberta Advantage (2006)	Hometowns (2008)	Departing (2011)

Professional ratings
Review scores
Source	Rating
Allmusic	3/5 stars
Spin	3.5/5 stars
Pitchfork Media	(8.0/10)

Hometowns is the debut album by Canadian indie rock band The Rural Alberta Advantage. Originally released independently in early 2008, the album gained international exposure when the band was selected as eMusic's featured artist of the month for November 2008. The band subsequently signed to Saddle Creek Records, and the label rereleased the album on July 7, 2009.

== Track listing ==
No.	Title	Length
1.	"The Ballad of the RAA"	3:28
2.	"Rush Apart"	1:54
3.	"The Dethbridge in Lethbridge"	2:13
4.	"Don't Haunt This Place"	2:35
5.	"The Deadroads"	2:41
6.	"Drain the Blood"	2:48
7.	"Luciana"	2:55
8.	"Frank, AB"	3:25
9.	"The Air"	3:24
10.	"Sleep All Day"	3:44
11.	"Four Night Rider"	1:53
12.	"Edmonton"	3:50
13.	"In the Summertime"	2:36
