= Trying to Get Somewhere =

Trying to Get Somewhere is the fifth and final release by Canadian indie rock band Shotgun & Jaybird, released in 2006 on Sappy Records.

== Track listing ==
1. "3 1 8 6 4 2 9 7 5"
2. "Two and Two is Four"
3. "Writing on Our Arms"
4. "Come Back Slowly"
5. "Borrowed Mini-Vans"
6. "Low Tide Phobia"
7. "Lovers of the World Be on Time Tonight"
8. "Cabin Fever"
9. "Head Security Guard Surveys the Ground Around Him"
10. "Re:tired"
11. "Pidgeon"

== Critical reception ==
Vish Khanna of Exclaim! Magazine said Trying to Get Somewhere was an unplanned "powerful, inspiring record".
