= Angels of Death (Jennifer Castle album) =

Studio album by Jennifer Castle
- Released: May 18, 2018
- Length: 34:39
- Label: Paradise of Bachelors

Jennifer Castle chronology
Pink City (2014)	Angels of Death (2018)	Monarch Season (2020)

Professional ratings
Aggregate scores
Source	Rating
Metacritic	81/100
Review scores
Source	Rating
Drowned in Sound	7/10
Exclaim!	9/10
Pitchfork	7.6/10

Angels of Death is the third studio album by Canadian singer-songwriter Jennifer Castle. It was released on May 18, 2018 under Paradise of Bachelors.

== Critical reception ==
Angels of Death was met with universal acclaim reviews from critics. At Metacritic, which assigns a weighted average rating out of 100 to reviews from mainstream publications, this release received an average score of 81, based on 7 reviews.

== Track listing ==
Angels of Death track listing
No.	Title	Length
1.	"Tomorrow's Mourning"	3:07
2.	"Crying Shame"	4:04
3.	"Texas"	3:18
4.	"Angels of Death"	3:54
5.	"We Always Change Reprise, Pt. 1"	1:21
6.	"Rose Waterfalls"	3:52
7.	"Grim Reaper"	3:07
8.	"Stars of Milk"	2:44
9.	"Tonight the Evening"	7:34
10.	"We Always Change Reprise, Pt. 2"	1:38
