= Dan Werb =

Canadian epidemiologist and former musician

Dan Werb is a Canadian epidemiologist and former musician.

== Musical career ==
As a musician he is best known for his work with the dance-punk band Woodhands, and his collaboration with Maylee Todd in the project Ark Analog. In 2011 he also participated in the National Parks Project, collaborating with musicians Sebastien Grainger and Jennifer Castle and filmmaker Catherine Martin to produce and score a short documentary film about Mingan Archipelago National Park Reserve in Quebec.

== Scientific research ==
As an epidemiologist, he has been associated with the British Columbia Centre for Excellence in HIV/AIDS, the International Centre for Science in Drug Policy and the UC San Diego School of Medicine. In 2015, he received a research grant for work in HIV/AIDS and drug addiction prevention.

In 2019, he published the book City of Omens: A Search for the Missing Women of the Borderlands, an examination of the complex factors threatening the safety of poor women in the Tijuana area of Mexico. The book was shortlisted for the Governor General's Award for English-language non-fiction at the 2019 Governor General's Awards.

His 2022 book, The Invisible Siege: The Rise of Coronaviruses and the Search for a Cure, was the winner of the Hilary Weston Writers' Trust Prize for Nonfiction.

His 2026 book Our Wild Familiars: How Animals Are Adapting to Cities and Reshaping the Natural World is based on three years of research into wild animals in human communities, otherwise known as synanthropes.
