= The Wild (The Rural Alberta Advantage album) =

2017 studio album by the Rural Alberta Advantage

Studio album by The Rural Alberta Advantage
- Released: October 13, 2017
- Length: 32:36
- Label: Paper Bag

The Rural Alberta Advantage chronology
Mended with Gold (2014)	The Wild (2017)	The Rise & The Fall (2023)

Professional ratings
Aggregate scores
Source	Rating
Metacritic	82/100
Review scores
Source	Rating
AllMusic	4/5 stars
Exclaim!	8/10
Paste	8.7/10

The Wild is the fourth studio album by Canadian band The Rural Alberta Advantage. It was released on October 13, 2017, through Paper Bag Records.

== Track listing ==
No.	Title	Length
1.	"Beacon Hill"	2:51
2.	"Bad Luck Again"	3:14
3.	"Dead/Alive"	2:20
4.	"Brother"	3:28
5.	"Toughen Up"	2:56
6.	"White Lights"	3:54
7.	"Alright"	3:13
8.	"Selfish Dreams"	3:59
9.	"Wild Grin"	2:46
10.	"Letting Go"	3:45

== Charts ==
Chart (2017)	Peak position
Canadian Albums (Billboard)	68
