= Laura Barrett =

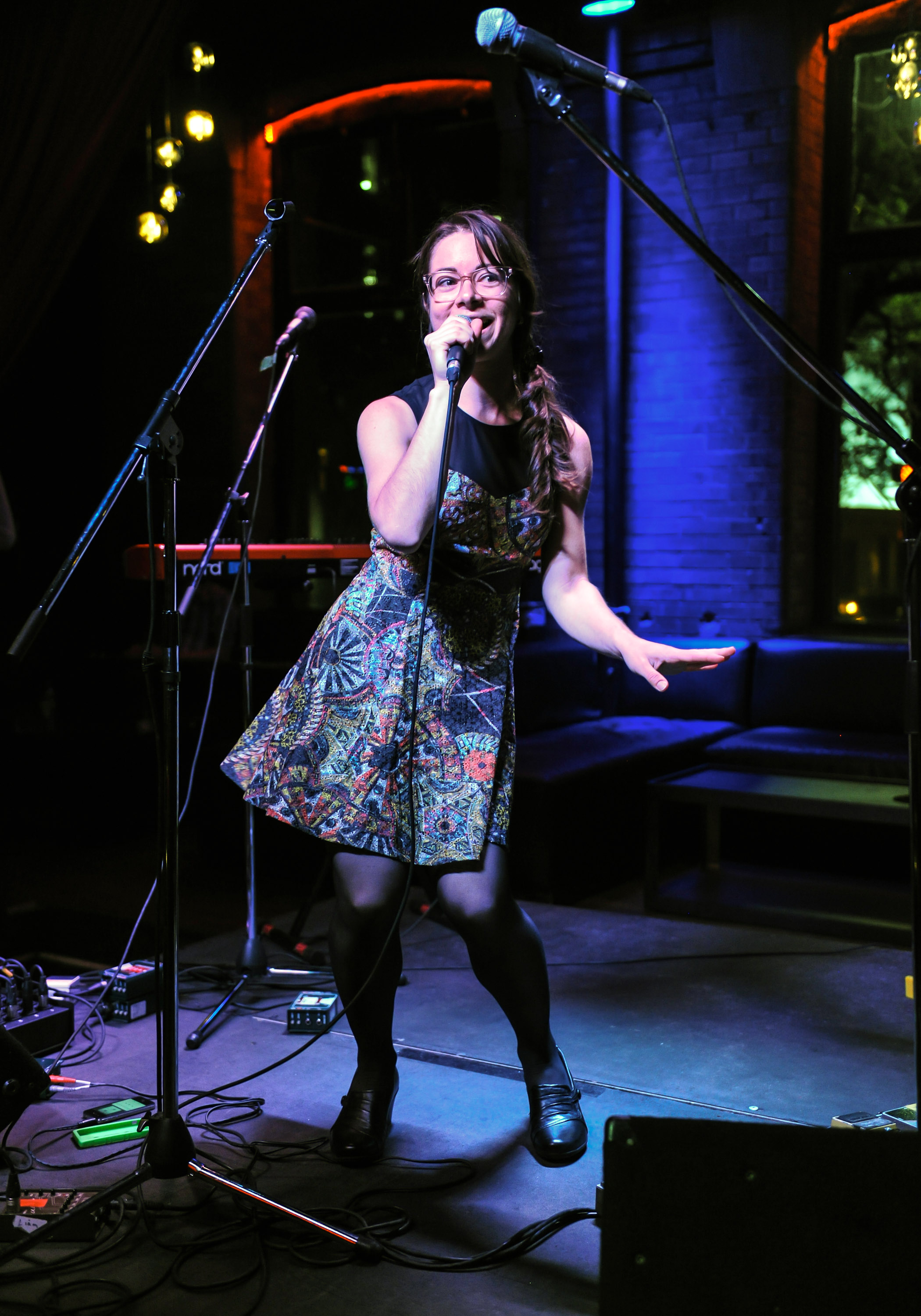
- Barrett at the 2015 Canadian Film Centre Slaight Music Residency Showcase
- Born: Toronto, Ontario, Canada
- Education: University of Toronto
- Musical career
- Genres: Indie pop
- Occupation: Singer-songwriter
- Instruments: Vocals; piano; kalimba
- Labels: Paper Bag
- Member of: The Hidden Cameras; Henri Fabergé and the Adorables

Laura Alexandra Barrett is a Canadian indie pop singer-songwriter, best known for incorporating the kalimba into her music. In addition to her solo work, Barrett has also performed as a member of The Hidden Cameras, Henri Fabergé and the Adorables, Woodhands, and Sheezer.

Barrett was born in Toronto. She studied English literature and linguistics at the University of Toronto, graduating in 2006. She later returned to school to complete a master of education and works as an occasional teacher within the Toronto District School Board.

A classically trained pianist, Barrett began studying piano at 8 years of age. She took up the kalimba as a hobby after buying one on eBay. Her first public performance as a solo performer was a cover of "Smells Like Nirvana" at a "Weird Al" Yankovic tribute concert (She had previously been a part of the band Lake Holiday). She subsequently released two EPs, and was the musical director for a New York City production of Maggie MacDonald's play The Rat King.

Barrett released her first full-length album, Victory Garden, in 2008 on Paper Bag Records. Produced by Paul Aucoin, the album featured Basia Bulat, Ajay Mehra and Lief Mosbaugh. In December 2008, Laura Barrett was the recipient of a CBC Radio 3 Bucky Award for "Sexiest Musician".

Barrett took part in the interactive documentary series City Sonic in 2009. The series, which featured 20 Toronto artists, had her talk about her first concert. The first rock concert she attended was, at the age of 12, at the Art Gallery of Ontario for the Rheostatics experimental set Music Inspired by the Group of Seven. Between 2010 and 2015, Barrett performed in Sheezer, an all-female Weezer tribute band, along with Robin Hatch, Dana Snell and Alysha Haugen. Started as a joke, the band covered music from the Weezer's first two albums The Blue Album and Pinkerton.

In 2010, Barrett accompanied The Magnetic Fields on their 11-date North American "Realism" tour. The following year she participated in the National Parks Project, collaborating with musicians Cadence Weapon and Mark Hamilton and filmmaker Peter Lynch to produce and score a short film about Alberta's Waterton Lakes National Park.

Who Is the Baker?, Barrett's first album in eleven years, was released in 2019. Recorded by Don Kerr, the album featured Karen Ng and Dana Snell. During the years prior to the release, Barrett mentioned musicians as part of Girls Rock Camp Toronto and composed scores alongside José Contreras for the films Porch Stories (2015) and Birdland (2018).

== Discography ==
- Who is the Baker? (2019)
- Victory Garden (2009)
- Earth Sciences (2008)
