= Ame Henderson =

Canadian choreographer

Ame Henderson is a Canadian choreographer and performance-maker raised on Vancouver Island. Henderson received a BFA from Concordia University (Montreal) and MFA from the Amsterdam School of the Arts.

In 2003, Henderson co-founded Public Recordings, an artist-led collective based in Toronto that creates works in dance, theatre, music, and publication. Henderson garnered praise and critical attention for her 2006 show /Dance/Songs/, created in collaboration with performers Chad Dembski, Claudia Fancello, and Matija Ferlin, with video by Daniel Arcé. After premiering at The Theatre Centre in Toronto, the show toured across Canada and internationally through 2009. Henderson's what we are saying (2013) marked another critical success. The show premiered at The Power Plant at Toronto's Harbourfront Centre and won two Dora Mavor Moore Awards in the dance division for Outstanding Production and Best Ensemble in 2014. Working with a rotating group of performers and collaborators the show went on to tour Canada and Europe through 2016.

Henderson has frequently worked with Christopher House and created new work at Toronto Dance Theatre, including Henderson/Castle: voyager (2014) in collaboration with singer-songwriter Jennifer Castle.

In 2014, Henderson was the Artist-in-residence at the Art Gallery of Ontario in Toronto, Canada. She is also an Associate Artist with the National Arts Centre in Ottawa, Canada.
