= Kitchens & Bathrooms =

Canadian indie math punk rock band

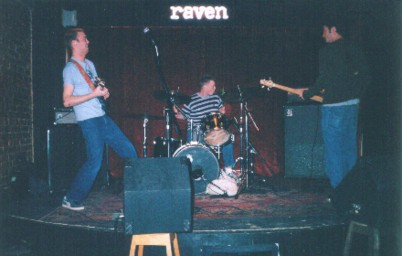

Background information
- Origin: Hamilton, Ontario, Canada
- Genres: Punk rock, Math rock, Independent
- Years active: 1998–2003
- Label: Sonic Unyon (CAN) / Forge Again (USA)
- Members: Phil Williams (guitarist, vox); Lee Penrose (drummer, vox); Adrian Murchison (bassist)
- Past members: Marco Bressette (guitarist); Matt David (guitarist, vox); Chris Gallimore (bassist)
- Website: http://www.myspace.com/kitchensandbathrooms

Kitchens & Bathrooms were a Canadian indie math punk rock band based in Hamilton, Ontario. Ongoing members of the band were Phil Williams (guitar, vocals), Lee Penrose (drums, vocals), Adrian Murchison (bass).

== History ==
Kitchens & Bathrooms formed in early 1998 in Hamilton as a four piece band. Williams, Penrose, and Murchison teamed up with singer and guitarist Matt David. The band released a self-titled EP in 1999.

David wrote much of their early material and features prominently on their 2001 album, Thousand Yard Stare, which was produced by the now deceased Dan Achen, cofounder of Catherine North Studios and guitarist for the Canadian band Junkhouse. The album is melodic, spacey, and heavy-pop with a youthful spirit; most of the songs, whose lyrics portray teenage angst, were written prior to members' 18th birthdays.

David left the band, and for a while Marco Bressette filled in on guitar, but eventually they continued as a three-piece and signed a record deal with Sonic Unyon. The next two releases by Kitchens & Bathrooms were recorded by Daniel L. Burton in Bloomington, Indiana. The first of the two Sonic Unyon releases, 2002's Utter a Sound, with its heavy, melodic tracks and shouted lyrics, was released to mixed reviews at a time when math-rock was gaining popularity in Southern Ontario. In 2003, the band released the album Vehicles Beyond, a softer and more focused album. It topped the !earshot National Top 50 chart in August that year.

In October, Kitchens & Bathrooms performed in Hamilton with the American band Early Day Miners. The band played their final show at the 2003 Sonic Unyon Christmas Party, a party that they had also played the year prior, on December 12, 2003. They then disbanded.

In 2006, Kitchens & Bathrooms reunited for a single show at The Casbah in their hometown of Hamilton, opening for Don Caballero.

Williams and Murchison went on to form the band The Inflation Kills, with Matt Fleming and Nicholas Daleo of fellow Hamilton band Hoosier Poet. The Inflation Kills toured across Canada after releasing one, self-titled, album with TikTokTikTok MUSIC! (distributed by Sonic Unyon). After The Inflation Kills disbanded in the late 2000s, Adrian Murchison went on to form, front, and tour with the band Pneumatic Transit, featuring Hoosier Poet and Inflation Kills drummer Nic Daleo.

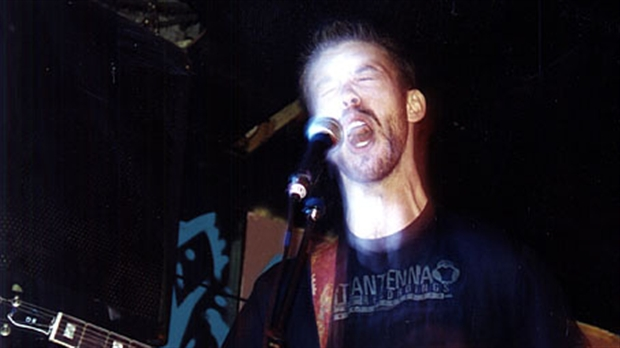
Phil Williams performing with Kitchens & Bathrooms

== Discography ==
- 2000: Kitchens & Bathrooms Ep
- 2001: Thousand Yard Stare
- 2002: Utter a Sound, Sonic Unyon
- 2003: Vehicles Beyond, Sonic Unyon (CAN), Forge Again (USA)
- Kitchens & Bathrooms songs appeared on compilation albums here and there during their active years
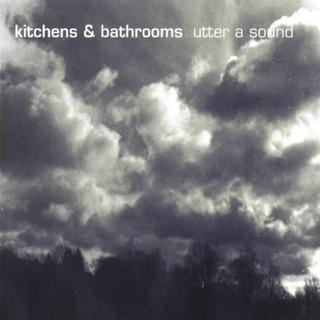
Utter a Sound cover art

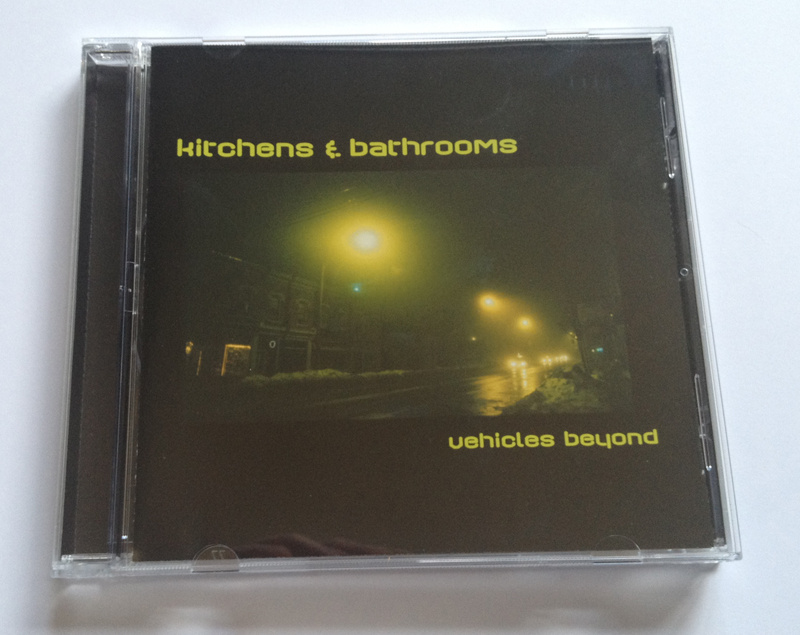
Vehicles Beyond cover art
