= Imaginary Cities =

Canadian indie pop duo

- Origin: Winnipeg, Manitoba, Canada
- Genres: Indie pop; indie rock
- Years active: 2010–2016
- Labels: Votiv; Hidden Pony
- Past members: Rusty Matyas; Marti Sarbit

Imaginary Cities was a Canadian indie pop duo based in Winnipeg, Manitoba. The project consisted of multi-instrumentalist Rusty Matyas, formerly of the Waking Eyes and a sometime collaborator of the Weakerthans, and vocalist Marti Sarbit.

== History ==
Matyas and Sarbit began collaborating in 2010. That year, they played a few live shows and began to record tracks for an album. In 2011, they continued performing, at first serving as the opening band for more established groups.

Their debut album, Temporary Resident, was released in 2011 on the Hidden Pony label; it went on to top Canada's campus radio charts. That year, the band won a Western Canada Music Award for Best Pop Album of the Year and was subsequently named as a longlisted nominee for the 2011 Polaris Music Prize. To support the album, they played several dates in Eastern Canada and the US as an opening act for Pixies.

Imaginary Cities performed at a number of pop festivals, including the 2013 NXNE, and gained a following in Germany. The band released their second album, Fall of Romance, in May 2013. Fall of Romance was produced, engineered, and mixed by Howard Redekopp, who has also worked with Tegan and Sara, the New Pornographers, and Mother Mother.

In 2014, they collaborated with Porter Robinson on his song "Hear the Bells". In the same year, Matyas toured with The Sheepdogs as a guitarist following the departure of Leot Hanson from that band.

Imaginary Cities stopped performing and recording in 2016. Sarbit launched the new band Lanikai the following year. Matyas suffered from alcoholism-related liver disease in 2017 and spent some time recovering before reemerging in 2021 with the solo project Rusty Robot.

== Discography ==
- Temporary Resident (2011)
- Fall of Romance (2013)
