= Jon-Rae Fletcher =

Canadian musician

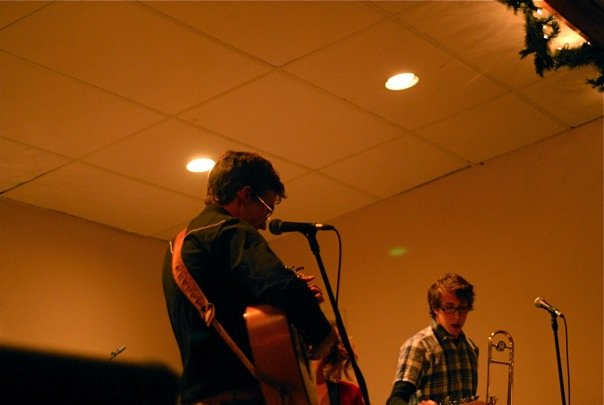

Background information
- Origin: Kelowna, British Columbia, Canada
- Genres: Rock, soul, Gospel, alt-country
- Occupation: Singer-songwriter
- Instruments: Vocals, guitar
- Labels: Deerandbird Records, Weewerk

Jon-Rae Fletcher is a Canadian singer-songwriter. He has recorded both as a solo artist and with a back-up band, The River.

== Background ==
Fletcher grew up in Kelowna, British Columbia, where as the son of a minister, he sang in his church's choir. Eventual musical developments included his discovery of Kurt Cobain and the formation of his own garage band. Jon-Rae later moved and founded the original River band with a collective of Vancouver friends, but disbanded the group when he moved east.

The River was reformed with like-minded Toronto musicians in 2003, and they grew into a popular cult band with an ever-expanding audience. Combining country, gospel, rock, and soul, Jon-Rae & The River created a unique blend of music, sometimes complemented by an on-stage choir. In 2006, Exclaim! labelled Fletcher "one of Toronto’s most captivating front-men, thanks to his impassioned performances and his glorious alt-gospel songs. Fuelled by alcohol and a fervent belief in the songs they're playing." Their critically acclaimed album Knows What You Need was released in 2006, but the band broke up soon afterward.

Fletcher moved back out west, settling in Brentwood Bay, British Columbia. He released his most recent album, the full length Oh, Maria, in 2009 via the label weewerk and toured to promote the album with a new band line-up. Oh Maria is his only album available to stream, on Spotify, YouTube and Amazon Music.

Several of his former backing musicians in The River later re-emerged with the alternative country band One Hundred Dollars.

== Discography ==
- Now Then (2000), Deerandbird Records
- Then Again (2001), Deerandbird Records
- The Road (2003), Hive-Fi Recordings
- Just A Closer Walk (2004), Blocks Recording Club
- Jon-Rae Fletcher & The River, Live Series (2005), Deerandbird Records
- Old Songs for the New Town (2005), Permafrost Records
- Knows What You Need (2006), We Are Busy Bodies
- Oh, Maria (2009), Weewerk
