= Bold Concert Series =

- Genre: Music
- Country of origin: Canada
- Original language: English
- No. of seasons: 1
- No. of episodes: 8

Production
- Running time: 60 minutes

Original release
- Network: bold
- Release: March 29 – May 10, 2009

Bold Concert Series is a Canadian English language television series. Bold Concert Series debuted on March 29, 2009, at 7:00 p.m. EST on the Canadian specialty channel, bold.

== Premise ==
In each episode, Bold Concert Series showcases various concerts featuring emerging and indie Canadian artists in an intimate concert setting. Each episode predominantly features live performances by the bands mixed with interview clips throughout.

== Bands featured ==
- Episode 1 - The Stills
- Episode 2 - Two Hours Traffic
- Episode 3 - Land of Talk
- Episode 4 - The Trews
- Episode 5 - Justin Rutledge
- Episode 6 - The Sadies
- Episode 7 - Constantines
- Episode 8 - The Waking Eyes
