= National Parks Project =

- Directed by: Various; see table
- Produced by: Joel McConvey; Kristina McLaughlin; Kevin McMahon; Michael McMahon; Geoff Morrison; Ryan Noth
- Cinematography: Stephen Chung; Jonathon Cliff; Steve Cosens; Catherine Lutes; Cabot McNenly; Chris Romeike; John Minh Tran
- Edited by: Caroline Christie; Dave De Carlo; Stéphane Lafleur; Andres Landau; Jeremiah Munce; Ryan Noth; Roland Schlimme; Duff Smith; Jeff Warren; Kathy Weinkauf; Eric Wiegand
- Music by: Various; see table
- Production companies: FilmCAN; Primitive Entertainment
- Release date: April 30, 2011 (Hot Docs)
- Running time: 120 minutes
- Country: Canada

The National Parks Project is a Canadian music and film project. Released in 2011 to mark the 100th anniversary of the creation of the National Parks of Canada system, the project sent teams consisting of three Canadian musicians and a filmmaker to 13 Canadian national parks, one in each province or territory, to shoot and score a short documentary film about the park.

The project was commissioned by Parks Canada and produced by FilmCAN and Primitive Entertainment, in association with Discovery World HD. Prior to its commissioning, a test film by Ryan Noth, Joel McConvey and Geoff Morrison entitled National Parks Project: Gros Morne, with cinematography by Peter Mettler, was released in 2009; although it was not included in the finished series, Noth, McConvey and Morrison were producers of the series.

In addition to airing on Discovery World and on the web, the series was also screened at a number of film festivals, including Toronto's Hot Docs.

Music from the project was released on several EPs, as well as on a compilation album that featured some of the most popular tracks.

== Awards ==
Zacharias Kunuk's segment, Sirmilik, won the Genie Award for Best Short Documentary Film at the 32nd Genie Awards. The overall series won the Gemini Award for Best Performing Arts Program or Series at the 26th Gemini Awards.

== Projects ==
Province/Territory	Park	Musicians	Filmmaker
Alberta	Waterton Lakes	Cadence Weapon, Laura Barrett, Mark Hamilton	Peter Lynch
British Columbia	Gwaii Haanas	Sarah Harmer, Bry Webb, Jim Guthrie	Scott Smith
Manitoba	Wapusk	Kathleen Edwards, Matt Mays, Sam Roberts	Hubert Davis
New Brunswick	Kouchibouguac	Casey Mecija, Don Kerr, Ohad Benchetrit	Jamie Travis
Newfoundland and Labrador	Gros Morne	Jamie Fleming, Melissa Auf der Maur, Sam Shalabi	Sturla Gunnarsson
Northwest Territories	Nahanni	Shad, Jace Lasek, Olga Goreas	Kevin McMahon
Nova Scotia	Cape Breton Highlands	Tony Dekker, Old Man Luedecke, Daniela Gesundheit	Keith Behrman
Nunavut	Sirmilik	Andrew Whiteman, Dean Stone, Tanya Tagaq	Zacharias Kunuk
Ontario	Bruce Peninsula	John K. Samson, Christine Fellows, Sandro Perri	Daniel Cockburn
Prince Edward Island	Prince Edward Island	Chad Ross, Sophie Trudeau, Dale Morningstar	John Walker
Quebec	Mingan Archipelago	Sebastien Grainger, Dan Werb, Jennifer Castle	Catherine Martin
Saskatchewan	Prince Albert	Andre Ethier, Mathieu Charbonneau, Rebecca Foon	Stéphane Lafleur
Yukon	Kluane	Graham Van Pelt, Ian D'Sa, Mishka Stein	Louise Archambault
