= Jon Claytor =

Canadian artist and author

Jon Claytor (born March 12, 1972) is a Canadian artist, graphic novelist, painter, and writer based in Sackville, New Brunswick. His work spans oil painting, watercolour, filmmaking, illustrated interviews, and graphic storytelling.

== Biography ==
Jon Claytor was born in San Francisco, California, and raised across Canada, eventually establishing his career in New Brunswick. He holds a BFA from Mount Allison University (1998), attended Nova Scotia College of Art and Design University (1991), and earned an MFA from York University in 2012.

With Paul Henderson and Julie Doiron, Claytor co-founded the independent music and arts festival SappyFest in 2006. He also co-owned and bartended at Thunder & Lightning Ideas Ltd. in Sackville, New Brunswick, starting in 2013.

He has exhibited paintings throughout the Maritimes, Toronto, Montreal, and Los Angeles.

He has also done cover art for musicians, including Doiron and Gord Downie. He was a Juno Award nominee for Album Artwork of the Year at the Juno Awards of 2004, for Downie's album Battle of the Nudes.

He was previously married to Doiron, with whom he has three children.

== Publications ==
=== Take the Long Way Home (2022) ===
A graphic memoir published by Conundrum Press, Take the Long Way Home recounts Claytor’s eight-week cross-Canada road trip in 2019, from Halifax to Prince Rupert, undertaken shortly after achieving sobriety. The 456-page work addresses themes of love, family, addiction, reflection, and redemption, rendered in expressive black-and-white illustration.

=== Nowhere (2026) ===
Nowhere, Claytor's debut graphic novel, is set in a fictionalized Sackville, New Brunswick where monsters roam and a mysterious cube appears at the town’s edge. The story follows Joel, a pre-teen navigating a bizarre realm that blends the real with the uncanny. It was published by Goose Lane Editions in March 2026.

The book was shortlisted for the 2026 Amazon Canada First Novel Award.

=== Other projects ===
Claytor is currently working on a book addressing the toxic drug supply in rural New Brunswick, co-authored with harm-reduction advocate Ashley Legere. He also leads creative workshops focused on storytelling and comic memoirs.

He has participated in the Cassiar Cannery Residency in Prince Rupert, British Columbia (2019), and the Skeleton Park Arts Fest Virtual Residency in Kingston, Ontario (2020).
