= One Hundred Dollars =

Canadian alternative folk country band

$100 (One Hundred Dollars)
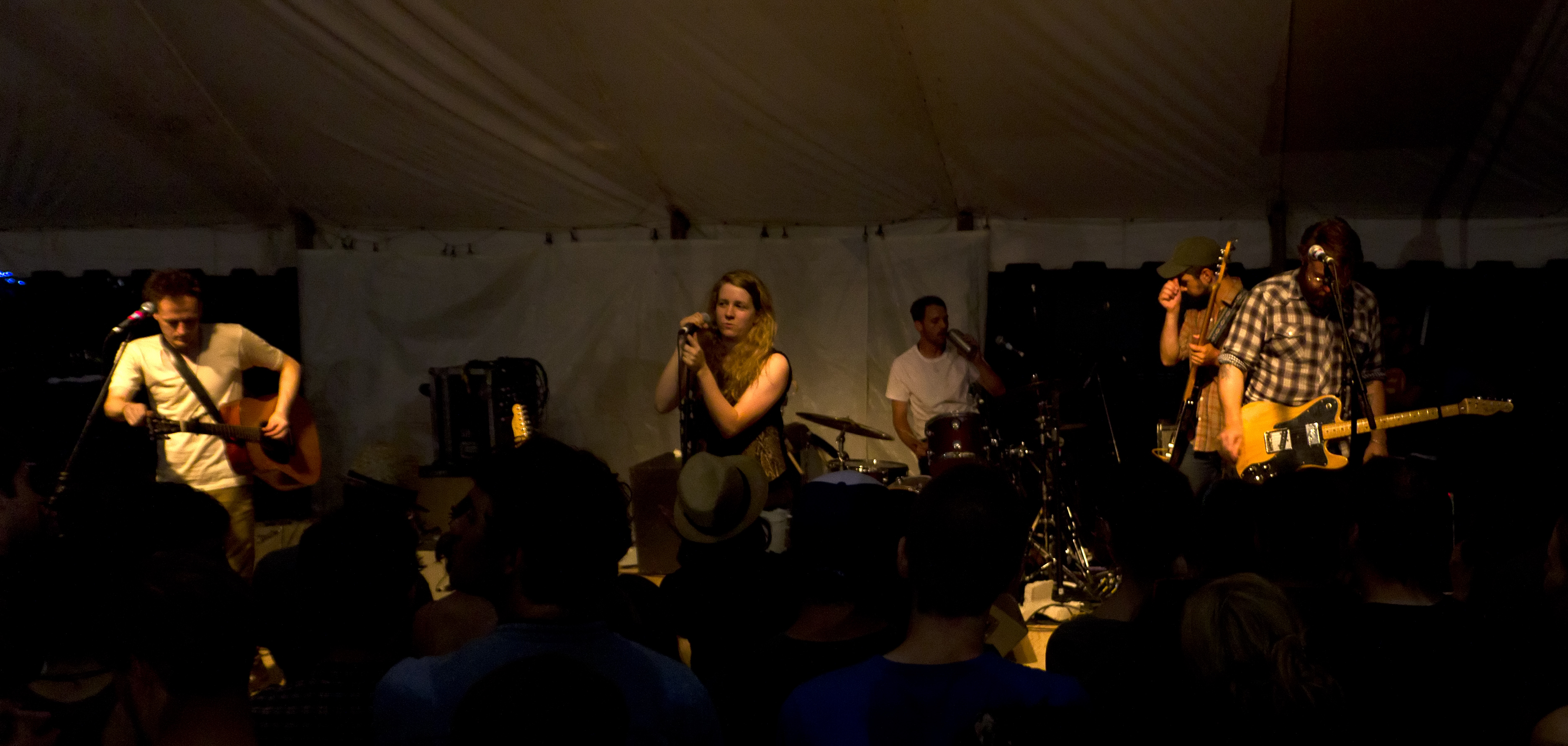

Background information
- Origin: Toronto, Ontario, Canada
- Genre: Alternative country
- Label: Blue Fog
- Members: Simone Schmidt; Ian Russell; Stew Crookes; Paul Mortimer; Kyle Porter; Dave Clarke; Jonathan Adjemian

One Hundred Dollars, sometimes seen as $100, is a Canadian alternative country band. Based in Toronto, Ontario, the band consisted of Simone Schmidt on vocals, Ian Russell on acoustic guitar, Stew Crookes on pedal steel, Paul Mortimer on electric guitar, Kyle Porter on bass, Dave Clarke on drums, and occasionally Jonathan Adjemian on organ and keyboards.

The band first formed in 2006 as a duo consisting of Russell and Schmidt, releasing their debut EP Hold it Together in 2007. However, Russell was diagnosed with leukemia around that time. While the band took a hiatus from performing due to his chemotherapy treatment, Russell and Schmidt continued to write songs together. When they returned to performing, they met Rick White, who invited them to record in his studio, and Russell called on the other band members, with whom he had previously played in Jon-Rae and the River, to participate in the recording.

The resulting album, Forest of Tears, was released July 25, 2008, on Blue Fog Recordings. The album was named a longlisted nominee for the 2009 Polaris Music Prize on June 15, 2009.

On May 10, 2011, Outside Music released the band's second album, Songs of Man. It was recorded in 12 days at the Woodshed in Toronto, and was later named a longlisted nominee for the 2011 Polaris Music Prize.

In January 2012, lead singer Simone Schmidt began performing in a solo project by the name of Fiver. In October 2012, Schmidt, Porter, and Mortimer announced a new psychedelic country band with drummer Simone TB, called The Highest Order.

== Discography ==
- Hold it Together (2007)
- Forest of Tears (2008)
- "Fourteenth Floor" Regional 7" Part 1 (2009)
- "My Father's House" - Regional 7" Part 2 (2010)
- Songs of Man (2011)
