= Precious Fathers =

- Origin: Vancouver, British Columbia, Canada
- Genres: Post-rock; Shoegazer
- Label: White Whale
- Members: Josh Lindstrom; Jaret Penner; Tim Loewen; Paul Goertzen
- Website: preciousfathers.com

Precious Fathers is a Canadian instrumental post-rock shoegazer ensemble, based in Vancouver, British Columbia. Its members are linked to other projects, including Destroyer, Loscil, Sparrow, and The Battles. Their music combines pulsating rhythms with multiple guitar effects and dynamic volume shifts.

== History ==
Guitarists Tim Loewen and Jaret Penner, along with drummer Josh Lindstrom and Paul Goertzen, founded Precious Fathers. In 2005, the band released their self-titled first album through the White Whale label. The album received some airplay on campus and community radio stations. The band performed that year in Toronto.

Precious Fathers' second album, Alluvial Fan, was released in 2009, and was streamed online. In June, the album appeared on the Earshot Radio Chart Top 50. That year the band performed locally in Vancouver.

== Discography ==
=== Albums ===
- 2005 Precious Fathers
- 2009 Alluvial Fan
