= Departing =

2011 studio album by the Rural Alberta Advantage

Studio album by The Rural Alberta Advantage
- Released: March 1, 2011
- Genres: Indie rock, Indie folk
- Labels: Paper Bag Records (CAN); Saddle Creek Records (US)

The Rural Alberta Advantage chronology
Hometowns (2008)	Departing (2011)	Mended with Gold (2014)

Departing is the second full-length album by Canadian indie rock band The Rural Alberta Advantage, released March 1, 2011 on Paper Bag Records in Canada and Saddle Creek Records in the United States.

In a review of their December 2010 concert performance at Lee's Palace, The Globe and Mail recommended the album as a must-hear for 2011.

The album was named as a longlisted nominee for the 2011 Polaris Music Prize.

The song "Tornado '87" is about the Edmonton tornado of July 31, 1987, which occurred when band leader Nils Edenloff was living in that city.

== Track listing ==
No.	Title	Length
1.	"Two Lovers"	3:23
2.	"The Breakup"	3:18
3.	"Under the Knife"	3:35
4.	"Muscle Relaxants"	2:55
5.	"North Star"	3:06
6.	"Stamp"	3:09
7.	"Tornado '87"	3:48
8.	"Barnes' Yard"	2:25
9.	"Coldest Days"	3:08
10.	"Good Night"	4:05
