= Falling Awake (album) =

Studio album by Goodnight, Sunrise
- Released: September 30, 2016
- Recorded: May–Aug 2015
- Genre: Rock, indie rock
- Length: 40:47
- Label: Rejection Records
- Producer: David Kochberg

Goodnight, Sunrise chronology
Create/Destroy/Create (2013)	Falling Awake (2016)	Against All Odds (2022)

Falling Awake is the second studio album by Canadian indie-rock band Goodnight, Sunrise, released worldwide on September 30, 2016.

Like the band's debut album Create/Destroy/Create, Falling Awake is a concept album. It describes a journey of self-exploration that moves through songs of uncertainty, fear, and chaos, towards self-knowledge. The album release was preceded by the first single "Familiar Faces" on July 6, 2016.

== Track listing ==
All tracks are written by Goodnight, Sunrise.

No.	Title	Length
1.	"Familiar Faces"	4:49
2.	"The Chase"	3:22
3.	"Altar"	3:42
4.	"Semantics"	4:23
5.	"The Catch"	3:27
6.	"All Things Past"	6:00
7.	"Deal With It"	3:45
8.	"You Could Have It All"	6:01
9.	"Born To Be"	4:59
Total length:		40:47

== Personnel ==
- David Kochberg - lead vocals, guitar, engineering, production
- Vanessa Vakharia - lead vocals, keyboards
- Paul Weaver - drums
- Pedro Salles - bass, backing vocals
- Matt Weston - mixing, engineering, alto sax on track 7
- Dean Marino - guitar engineering
- Isaac Moore - trumpet on track 7
- João Carvalho - mastering
- Genevieve Blais - album art photography
