= 2011 Polaris Music Prize =

Annual Canadian music award ceremony

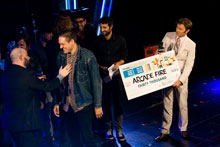
Arcade Fire at the 2011 Polaris Music Prize Gala

The 2011 edition of the Canadian Polaris Music Prize was presented on September 19, 2011 The winner was Arcade Fire, for the album The Suburbs, making it the only album in history to win the Polaris Music Prize, the Juno Award for Album of the Year, and the Grammy Award for Album of the Year in the same year.

For the 2011 award, the prize was increased to $30,000 for the winning musician.

== Shortlist ==
The prize's 10-album shortlist was announced on July 6.

- Arcade Fire, The Suburbs
- Austra, Feel It Break
- Braids, Native Speaker
- Destroyer, Kaputt
- Galaxie, Tigre et diésel
- Hey Rosetta!, Seeds
- Ron Sexsmith, Long Player Late Bloomer
- Colin Stetson, New History Warfare Vol. 2: Judges
- Timber Timbre, Creep on Creepin' On
- The Weeknd, House of Balloons

== Longlist ==
The prize's preliminary 40-album longlist was announced on June 16.

- Arcade Fire, The Suburbs
- Austra, Feel It Break
- Black Mountain, Wilderness Heart
- Braids, Native Speaker
- Buck 65, 20 Odd Years
- Louise Burns, Mellow Drama
- D-Sisive, Jonestown 2: Jimmy Go Bye Bye
- The Dears, Degeneration Street
- Destroyer, Kaputt
- Diamond Rings, Special Affections
- Dirty Beaches, Badlands
- Luke Doucet and the White Falcon, Steel City Trawler
- Eternia & MoSS, At Last
- Galaxie, Tigre et diésel
- Jenn Grant, Honeymoon Punch
- Tim Hecker, Ravedeath, 1972
- Hey Rosetta!, Seeds
- Hooded Fang, Album
- Imaginary Cities, Temporary Resident
- Land of Talk, Cloak and Cipher
- Little Scream, The Golden Record
- The Luyas, Too Beautiful to Work
- Malajube, La caverne
- Miracle Fortress, Was I the Wave?
- One Hundred Dollars, Songs of Man
- Doug Paisley, Constant Companion
- PS I Love You, Meet Me at the Muster Station
- Daniel Romano, Sleep Beneath the Willow
- The Rural Alberta Advantage, Departing
- Ron Sexsmith, Long Player Late Bloomer
- Shotgun Jimmie, Transistor Sister
- Sloan, The Double Cross
- Frederick Squire, March 12
- Stars, The Five Ghosts
- Colin Stetson, New History Warfare Vol. 2: Judges
- Timber Timbre, Creep on Creepin' On
- The Weeknd, House of Balloons
- Women, Public Strain
- Neil Young, Le Noise
- Young Galaxy, Shapeshifting
