= The Rural Alberta Advantage =

Canadian rock band

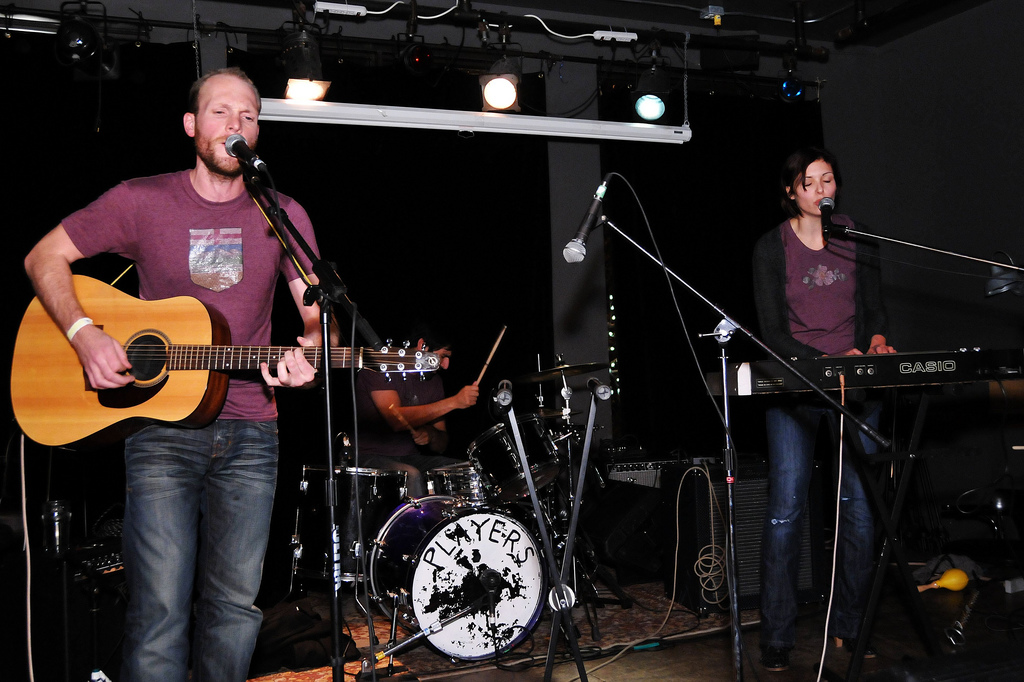

Background information
- Origin: Toronto, Ontario, Canada
- Genres: Indie rock
- Years active: 2005–present
- Labels: Paper Bag; Saddle Creek
- Members: Amy Cole; Nils Edenloff; Paul Banwatt
- Past members: Robin Hatch
- Website: theraa.com

The Rural Alberta Advantage is a Canadian indie rock band that formed in 2005 in Toronto, Ontario. The band consists of Nils Edenloff on lead vocals and guitar; Amy Cole (Robin Hatch between September 2016 and January 2018) on keyboards, bass, and backing vocals; and Paul Banwatt on drums. They have released five albums and are signed to Paper Bag Records in Canada and Saddle Creek Records internationally. In 2011, they were nominated for a Polaris Music Prize.

== History ==
The Rural Alberta Advantage was formed after the band members met while organizing an open-mic event at The Winchester in Cabbagetown. The band's name was coined by Edenloff's brother, when he wrote in an e-mail to Edenloff that he was planning to explore "the rural Alberta advantage" by spending some time back on the family farm near Donalda, Alberta where they had spent part of their childhoods.

First formed in 2005, the band recorded a demo tape and released an EP independently before completing their first full-length album, Hometowns, in early 2008. Hometowns was recorded and produced from April 2007 to March 2008 by Roger Leavens at BoomBox Sound in Toronto, Ontario. The band toured extensively across Canada, including shows at the Pop Montreal and Halifax Pop Explosion festivals, to support Hometowns.

The band was selected as eMusic's featured artist of the month for November 2008. The band subsequently signed to Saddle Creek Records in 2009, and Hometowns was re-released by the label in July. The band was also selected as the X3 Artist of the month by Aux.tv, CBC Radio 3 and Exclaim! for July 2009.

Their second LP, Departing, was released on March 1, 2011. The album was named as a longlisted nominee for the 2011 Polaris Music Prize, and José Lourenço's music video for "Stamp" received a Juno Award nomination for Video of the Year at the Juno Awards of 2012.

Their third album, Mended with Gold, was released on September 30, 2014. In the fall of 2014, Mended with Gold was featured on NPR's All Songs Considered list for the top albums of September.

On September 12, 2016, Amy Cole announced her departure from the group via the band's website. On September 18, the band announced a new tour with keyboard, bass pedal, and backup vocals being supplied by Robin Hatch. On November 7, the band announced that their fourth studio album was forthcoming.

Their fourth studio album, The Wild, was released on October 13, 2017. Its lead track "Beacon Hill" was inspired by the 2016 Fort McMurray wildfires.

In January 2018, the band announced that Cole had rejoined their lineup.

On March 31, 2022, their second EP The Rise was released with six songs.

To build up anticipation for their 2023 tour, the single "Plague Dogs" was released on January 31, 2023.

== Discography ==
=== Albums ===
Title	Album details	Peak chart positions		
Title	Album details	CAN	US Heat	US Indie
Hometowns	Released: 2008; Re-released: July 7, 2009; Label: Self-released / Saddle Creek	—	49	—
Departing	Released: March 1, 2011; Label: Paper Bag / Saddle Creek	—	4	30
Mended with Gold	Released: October 30, 2014; Label: Paper Bag / Saddle Creek	—	8	38
The Wild	Released: October 13, 2017; Label: Paper Bag	68	—	—
The Rise & The Fall	Release: October 4, 2023; Label: Saddle Creek (US) / Paper Bag (CAN/EU)	TBD	TBD	TBD
"—" denotes album that did not chart or was not released

=== EPs ===
- The Rural Alberta Advantage EP (2006)
- The Rise (2022) - Label: Saddle Creek

=== Singles ===
Year	Title	Peak chart positions		Album
Year	Title	CAN Rock	US Sales	Album
2009	"Frank, AB (Remix)" / "The Deadroads"	—	—	Hometowns
2010	"Drain the Blood"	—	50	Hometowns
2011	"Tornado '87"	45	—	Departing
2011	"Stamp"	—	—	Departing
2014	"Terrified"	40	—	Mended with Gold
2016	"White Lights"	36	—	The Wild
2017	"Beacon Hill"	—	—	The Wild
2017	"Brother"	31	—	The Wild
2018	"Bad Luck Again"	34	—	The Wild
2022	"Candu" / "AB Bride"	33	—	The Rise
2023	"Plague Dogs"	37	—	The Rise & The Fall
2023	"Conductors"			The Rise & The Fall
2025	"Falling Apart"			Upcoming sixth album
"—" denotes single that did not chart or was not released

=== Compilations ===
- Friends in Bellwoods (2007): "The Air"
- Friends in Bellwoods II (2009): "Rough and Tumble" (early version of "Barnes' Yard" from Departing)

=== Music Videos ===
- Vulcan, AB (2014) - Mended with Gold
- Not Love or Death (2015) - Mended with Gold
- Brother (2017) - The Wild
- Bad Luck Again (2018) - The Wild
- 3 Sisters (2022) - The Rise EP
- Plague Dogs (2023) - The Rise & The Fall
