= Blue Fog Recordings =

Canadian record label

Blue Fog Recordings is a Canadian independent record label. Based in Toronto, Ontario, the label is owned and operated by musician Rick White and Brian Taylor of the Toronto record store Rotate This.

The label is distributed by Sonic Unyon, and has released material by White, One Hundred Dollars, Andre Ethier, Castlemusic, Eiyn Sof, Elevator, Frederick Squire, Ghost Story, Nordic Nomadic, Rammer, The Unintended and Wyrd Visions, as well as a compilation album of early hardcore punk bands from Toronto.

On May 14, 2010, all of the bands who were signed to Blue Fog at that time performed at Blue Fog Revue, a multiartist concert at Toronto's Lee's Palace.
