= Calling It Quits/Crazy Tropical Survival Guide =

Single by Kate Maki and Frederick Squire
- A-side: "Calling It Quits"
- B-side: "Crazy Tropical Survival Guide"
- Released: March 22, 2011
- Recorded: Paco Loco Studio; El Puerto de Santa María, Spain
- Genre: Country
- Producers: Kate Maki and Frederick Squire

"Calling It Quits"/"Crazy Tropical Survival Guide" is a two-song single by Frederick Squire and Kate Maki, released as a 7-inch and digital download on March 22, 2011. The release features two songs that the duo recorded at Paco Loco Studio in El Puerto de Santa Maria while traveling in Spain.

Both Squire and Maki released full-length albums, Maki's Moonshine and Squire's Frederick Squire Sings Shenandoah and Other Popular Hits, on May 24, 2011. They embarked on a joint tour across Canada to support the two-song single and their solo albums, which was named the "Calling It Quits Tour".

== Track listing ==
1. Calling It Quits
2. Crazy Tropical Survival Guide
