= Papermaps =

Canadian indie rock band

- Origin: Toronto, Ontario, Canada
- Genres: Indie rock, Dream pop
- Years active: 2009–present
- Label: Sparks Music / Distributed by Universal Music Group
- Members: Dean Marino; Betty Dimo; Andy Soto; Johnny Rowe
- Past members: Wendy Leung; Todd Harrison; Bobby Lee
- Website: papermaps.net

Papermaps are a Canadian indie rock band from Toronto, Ontario, consisting of record producer, guitarist and songwriter Dean Marino, drummer Bobby Lee, bassist Betty Dimo and guitarist/keyboardist Andy Soto. Past members include keyboardist/guitarist Todd Harrison and keyboardist Wendy Leung.

== Biography ==
In the fall of 2008 Dean Marino recorded an album entitled Central Meaner Street under the name EX~PO. He recruited musicians Wendy Leung, Bobby Lee and Todd Harrison in order to perform live shows. Throughout 2009 and 2010 EX~PO continued to play live and collaborated on new material. The band changed its name to Papermaps shortly before signing to Canadian indie label Sparks Music. On April 19, 2011 Sparks Music released Papermaps' self-titled debut album in Canada (distributed by EMI Canada). In September 2011, Betty Dimo joined the band as bassist and Todd Harrison moved to additional guitar and keyboard. Her debut appearance with the band was on September 8 at the Horseshoe Tavern (Toronto).

Leading up to the album's official retail release date Papermaps garnered praise and support from several music blogs and Canadian college radio stations, including John Sakamoto's Anti-Hit List. Papermaps debuted at No. 32 on the ChartAttack Top 50 Canadian campus radio charts remaining there for 8 weeks and at No. 38 on the Earshot Radio Chart (NCRA) Weekly Top 50 Canadian campus radio charts, peaking at No. 16. The album remained in the !Earshot Monthly Top 200 from May – August 2011(positions No. 26 and No. 38, No. 178 and No. 127 respectively).

In June 2012, during Toronto's NXNE Music Festival, Exclaim.ca (the online presence of Exclaim! Magazine) announced that the next Papermaps release would be an EP entitled Inferior Ghost. The first single from the EP, "There Are Wolves," was made available for streaming through Exclaim.ca. The EP was digitally released on Tuesday August 14, 2012 by Sparks Music/Universal Music Group and physically (on CD and Vinyl) Tuesday August 28, 2012. The album debuted on the !Earshot Monthly Top 200 Chart at No.100 in September, 2012 and the song "Reaction Formation" entered the CBC Radio 3 R3-30 Chart the week ending October 12 at No. 9. It stayed on the chart for four weeks, peaking at No. 5. After completing an East Coast tour of Canada in August 2012, both Wendy Leung and Todd Harrison left the band. In a statement on the band's official website Dean Marino said, "Todd and Wendy’s reasons for leaving the group are their own and so I won’t discuss them here (or anywhere) but I want everyone to know that it’s been great making records and playing live shows with them" he also added "I’m excited by the idea of working within the context of a 3-piece, just Bobby Lee, Betty Dimo and myself." Months later it was announced that the band had begun work on a follow-up to Inferior Ghost and that guitarist/keyboardist Andy Soto would be joining the band. Soto made his first live appearance at Canadian Music Week 2013.

On October 8, 2013 the band released their second full-length album, Darker Lights. It was leaked on the internet on October 7, 2013 by BlackBook Magazine. The album's first single, "The Hedonist" entered the CBC Radio 3 R3-30 Chart on October 11, 2013 at No.7 and remained on the chart (peaking at No.7) for eight consecutive weeks. "The Hedonist" also entered the Mediabase Canada Alternative Spins Chart at No.50 on October 19, 2013 and remained in the chart for sixteen weeks. The song, "Poor City," also made the CBC Radio 3 R3-30 chart where it remained for seven consecutive weeks. Darker Lights entered the !Earshot National Top 50 College and Community Radio Chart on September 24, 2013 at No.35. It remained there for three weeks (peaking at No. 23) before re-entering the chart again (at No.36) on October 22, 2013 where it remained for four more consecutive weeks.

On Friday April 13, 2018, Papermaps released their third full-length album: Confessions: To Each Their Own Rapture. This album was a collaborative effort between Marino, Dimo and new drummer, Johnny Rowe. Guitarist Andy Soto, although still a member of the band, is absent from the recordings.

== Discography ==
=== Full Length Albums ===
- Papermaps (CD/Digital, April 19, 2011)
- Inferior Ghost (LP/CD/Digital, August 28, 2012)
- Darker Lights (LP/CD/Digital, October 8, 2013)
- Confessions: To Each Their Own Rapture (LP/Digital, April 13, 2018)

=== Singles ===
| Year | Song | Chart peak | Album |
| Year | Song | CAN Alt | Album |
|---|---|---|---|
| 2011 | "Reunion" | 40 | Papermaps |
"—" denotes a release that did not chart.
