= Shotgun Jimmie =

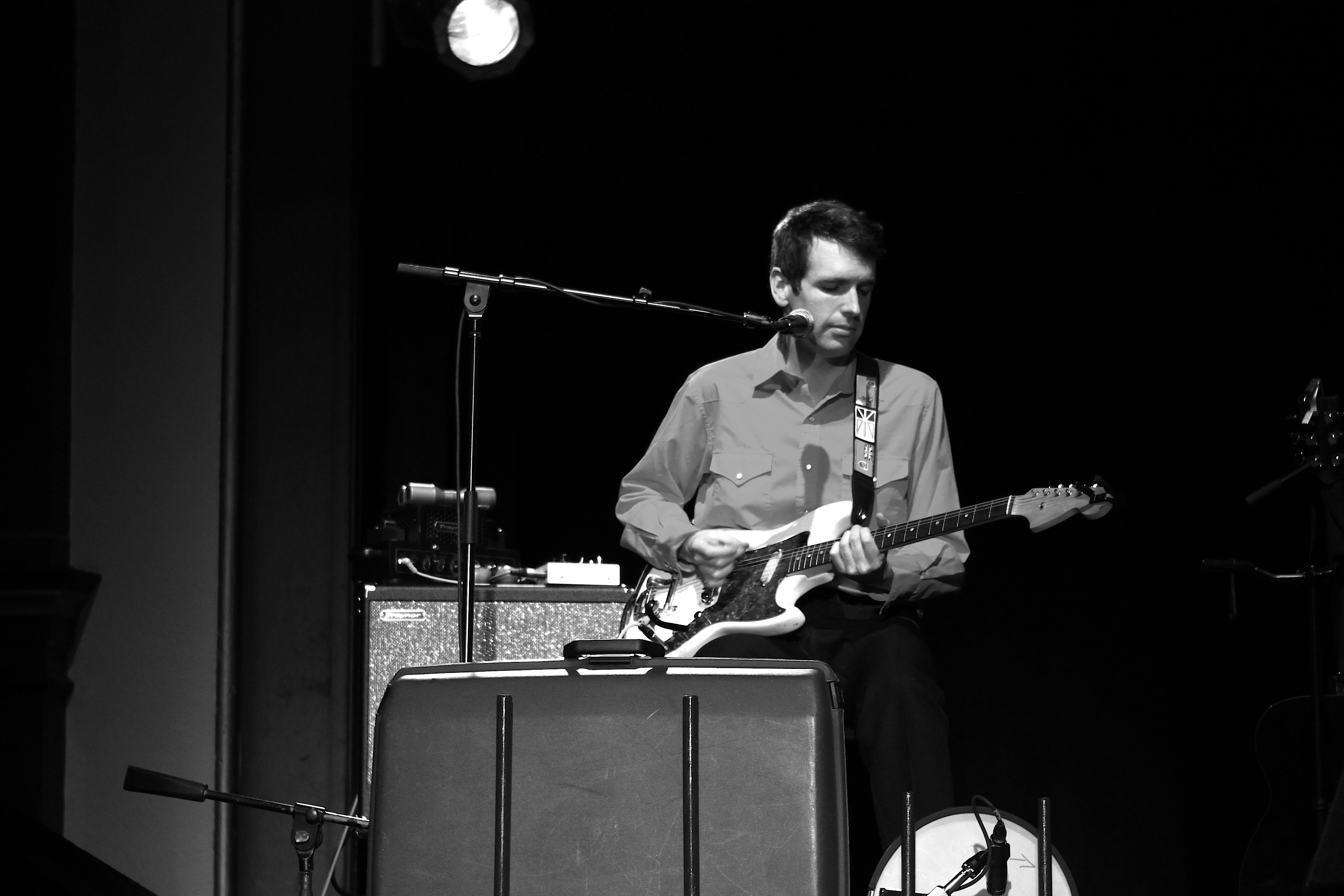
- Shotgun Jimmie, March 2012

Background information
- Born: Jim Kilpatrick
- Origin: Canada
- Genre: Indie rock
- Occupation: Singer-songwriter
- Formerly of: Shotgun & Jaybird
- Website: shotgunjimmie.net

Jimmie Kilpatrick, formerly known as Shotgun Jimmie is the stage name of Jim Kilpatrick, a Canadian singer-songwriter. Formerly associated with the band Shotgun & Jaybird, since that band's breakup he has released several albums as a solo artist.

His 2011 album Transistor Sister was named as a longlisted nominee for the 2011 Polaris Music Prize.

On March 24, 2017, a 30-track tribute album to Kilpatrick and his songwriting was released via bandcamp.com, by a fan-driven label known as "Comin' Around Records". Artists featured on the album included Kilpatrick's former Shotgun & Jaybird bandmate Frederick Squire, as well as Michael Feuerstack, Spencer Burton, Huron, By Divine Right, Eamon McGrath, Jenny Omnichord, Woodpigeon, Old Man Luedecke, and Selina Martin.

In 2025, he contributed a cover of Joel Plaskett's "Face of the Earth" to the Plaskett tribute album Songs from the Gang. In April 2025, he announced he would be changing his stage name to Jimmie Kilpatrick and released Jimmie shortly afterwards.

== Discography ==
- The 6000 True Stories of Love (2004)
- The Onlys (2007)
- Still Jimmie (2009)
- Paint it Pink (2009, EP)
- Organ Donor (2009, Limited to one copy, auctioned off with an organ)
- Transistor Sister (2011)
- Everything Everything (2013)
- Field of Trampolines (2016)
- The Heat Death (2018, with José Contreras of By Divine Right as The Heat Death)
- Transistor Sister 2 (2019)
- VHS EP (2019)
- Hardly Working (2024, with Ariel Sharrat and Mathias Kom of The Burning Hell)
- Jimmie (2025, As "Jimmie Kilpatrick")
