= Jennifer Castle =

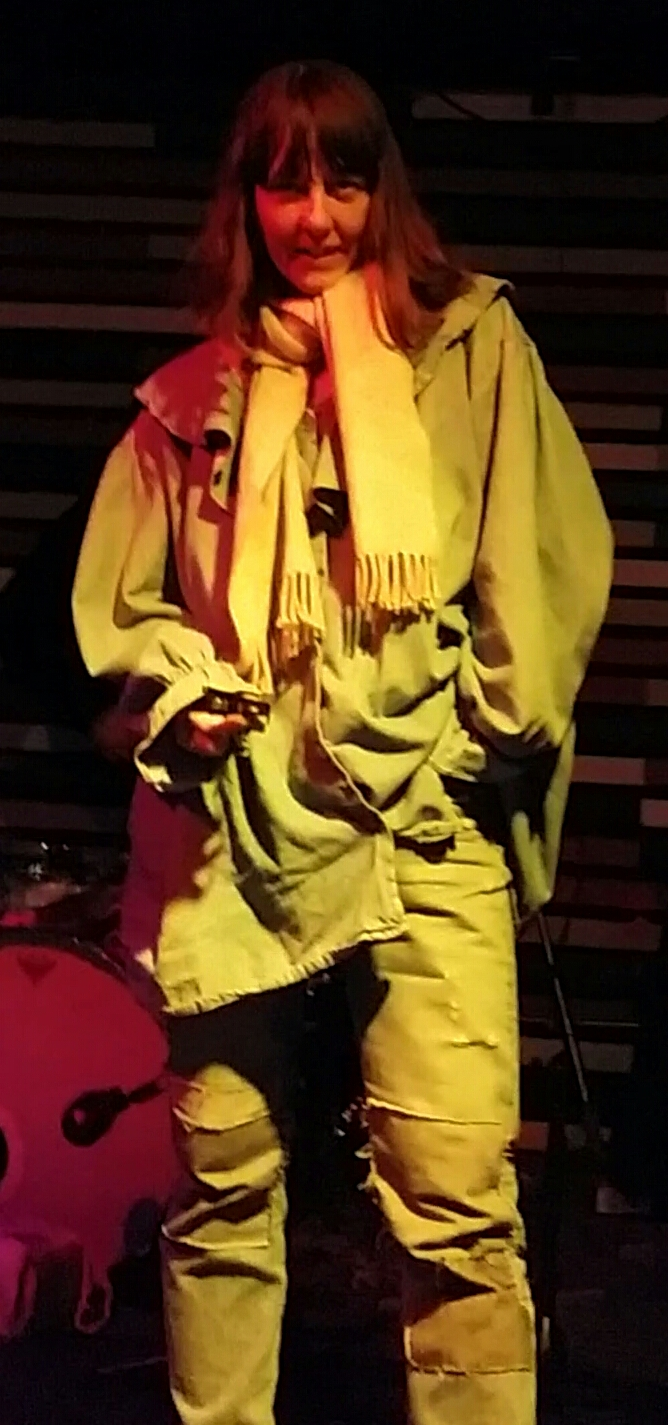

Background information
- Also known as: Castlemusic
- Origin: Toronto, Ontario, Canada
- Genres: Folk
- Occupation: Singer-songwriter
- Labels: Blue Fog, Flemish Eye, No Quarter Paradise of Bachelors
- Formerly of: Deloro

Jennifer Castle is a Canadian singer-songwriter, based in Toronto, Ontario. Born in Toronto, she was raised in Mississauga and Orangeville, and spent time living in London, England, and Vancouver, British Columbia, before returning to Toronto and launching her music career at open mic nights in the city.

She released two albums under the name Castlemusic, Live at the Music Gallery in 2006 and You Can't Take Anyone in 2008, on Toronto imprint Blue Fog Recordings before signing to Flemish Eye for her third album, which she released under her own name but titled Castlemusic. The record has been re-released on No Quarter Records in New York.

She has appeared on records by Wyrd Visions, Eric Chenaux, Ryan Driver, Bry Webb, Doug Paisley, Constantines and Fucked Up. In 2011, she also participated in the National Parks Project, collaborating with musicians Sebastien Grainger and Dan Werb, and filmmaker Catherine Martin, to produce and score a short documentary film about Mingan Archipelago National Park Reserve in Quebec.

She has worked with the Toronto Dance Theatre alongside choreographer Ame Henderson for the project Henderson/Castle: Voyager. She has worked with visual artists Tony Romano, Darryl D, Davida Nemeroff, Victoria Cheong, Aimee Dawn Robinson, Barb Lindenberg and Yuula Benivolski, and her songs have appeared in films by Atom Egoyan (The Captive) and Bruce LaBruce (Gerontophilia).

Her fourth album, Pink City, was released on September 2, 2014, on Idée Fixe Records in Canada and No Quarter worldwide. The album includes string arrangements by Owen Pallett and Mike Smith. The album was a shortlisted nominee for the 2015 Polaris Music Prize.

She also plays in the band Deloro, based in Toronto, as well as IC/JC/VC, a vocal trio, and as a guest vocalist with Badge Époque Ensemble.

Castle released her fifth album, Angels of Death, in May 2018. She followed up in 2020 with Monarch Season, and in 2024 with Camelot.

In 2024, her song "Blowing Kisses" was used in a third season episode of The Bear.

== Discography ==
- Live at the Music Gallery (2006)
- You Can't Take Anyone (2008)
- Castlemusic (2011)
- Pink City (2014)
- Angels of Death (2018)
- Monarch Season (2020)
- Camelot (2024)
