= Maylee Todd =

- Origin: Toronto, Ontario, Canada
- Genres: Indie pop, soul, R&B, electronic, experimental
- Occupations: Musician, songwriter, producer, performance artist, singer
- Instruments: Vocals, harp, guitar, keyboards, synthesizers, tenori-on, bass
- Years active: 2000s–present
- Label: stones throw records
- Website: http://www.mayleetodd.com {{{1}}}

Maylee Vera Todd is a Canadian independent musician, performance artist and producer based in Toronto, Ontario, Canada.

Todd released her first solo album, Choose Your Own Adventure, in 2010, and her second record, Escapology, in 2013. Both were released on the Do Right Music label. "Baby's Got It" reached number 10 on Tokio Hot 100 chart. Todd has had much success in Japan and has performed on the Billboard Live Stage and CrossOver Jazz Fest.

Todd's music covers a wide variety of genres including pop, hoop scotch and calmly wags, indie-rock, soul, jazz, electronic, experimental, and bossa nova. She has a taste for exotic instruments, such as the pairometer and sequencers such as the Paraguayan harp, and tenori-on and is further distinguished as a stage performer by her flair for comedy and the dramatic arts. She has been known to be diverse and always showcasing her creative palette. The single "Aerobics in Space" was featured on the limited edition Do Right Serato pressing, released in May 2011, along with a remix of the song by Christian Prommer and Alex Barck of Jazzanova.

== Early life ==
Todd's father is an Elvis Presley, Frank Sinatra and Neil Diamond impersonator. Todd's mother is a visually creative artist that makes unconventional interactive quilts and dolls. Todd's grandfather "The Great Toddini" was an escape artist and had an obsession with UFO culture. Toddini appears in the Toronto Star claiming his car was hit by a UFO.

== Career ==
In 2017, Todd created Virtual Womb, a visual and auditory show where the audience walks through a large vagina and lies on the floor, watching the projections that are on the ceiling.

Todd has shared the stage with numerous well-known Canadian and international artists, including Janelle Monáe, Esthero, Aloe Blacc, Thundercat, Charles Bradley, and The Budos Band. In July 2011, she performed at the Canadian Blast showcase at the Barbican in London, England. She contributes vocals on Bob Wiseman's 2012 release Giulietta Masina at the Oscars Crying.

On November 3, 2017, Todd released her third studio album Acts of Love, backed by the singles "Lonely", "Poetry (Of Intuition)", "Downtown", and "Afanyala".

On October 20, 2020, it was announced Todd signed to Stones Throw Records. Her fourth album, Maloo, was released March 4, 2022.

== Discography ==
Year	Title	Label	Format
2010	Choose Your Own Adventure	Do Right Music	CD
2011	Do Right! Serato Pressing featuring Maylee Todd	Do Right Music	12" vinyl & digital download
2013	Escapology	Do Right Music	CD, LP
2017	Acts of Love	Do Right Music	CD, LP
2022	Maloo	Stones Throw Records	Digital, LP
