= Frederick Squire =

Canadian musician

- Origin: Ajax, Ontario, Canada
- Genres: folk, alternative country, rock
- Occupation: singer-songwriter
- Instruments: Vocals, guitar
- Years active: 2004–present
- Label: Blue Fog Recordings
- Formerly of: Shotgun & Jaybird

Frederick Squire is a Canadian rock singer, songwriter and guitarist. Originally from Ajax, Ontario, he is based in Sudbury following a number of years living in Sackville, New Brunswick.

Formerly a member of Shotgun & Jaybird, in which he used the stage name Dick Morello, he has collaborated with Julie Doiron, both on her solo albums and in the band Calm Down It's Monday. Squire and Doiron, additionally, collaborated with Mount Eerie on the 2008 album Lost Wisdom and with Daniel Romano of Attack in Black on 2009's Daniel, Fred & Julie.

In 2010, Squire released a tour-only EP, March 12. An expanded version of the EP was released on November 2 on Blue Fog Recordings, and was later named as a longlisted nominee for the 2011 Polaris Music Prize.

In the fall of 2010, Squire and fellow Canadian songwriter Kate Maki travelled to Paco Loco Studio in El Puerto de Santa Maria to record two country songs. Calling It Quits/Crazy Tropical Survival Guide was released as a seven-inch two-song single and digital download on March 22, 2011.

After touring Canada together in 2011 in support of their seven-inch as well as Squire's second solo album, Frederick Squire Sings Shenandoah and Other Popular Hits, and Maki's fifth solo album, Moonshine, the duo decided to take a break from touring and settled in the Copper Cliff area of Sudbury to start a family. Squire and Maki were married in 2012, separated, then finally divorced in 2023.

His album Spooky Action at a Distance was released on May 27, 2016. Around the same time, he began to study mechanical engineering at Laurentian University, and is currently an instructor in the mechanical engineering technician program at Cambrian College.

== Discography ==
- Rubber Covered Painter Must Remain Inside Exit Flange to Maintain Anti-wicking Seal (2004, as Dick Morello)
- Lost Wisdom (2008, with Julie Doiron and Mount Eerie)
- Daniel, Fred & Julie (2009, with Julie Doiron and Daniel Romano)
- March 12 (2010)
- Calling It Quits/Crazy Tropical Survival Guide (2011, with Kate Maki)
- Frederick Squire Sings Shenandoah and Other Popular Hits (2011)
- Spooky Action at a Distance (2016)
