= Dale Murray (musician) =

Canadian singer-songwriter and musician

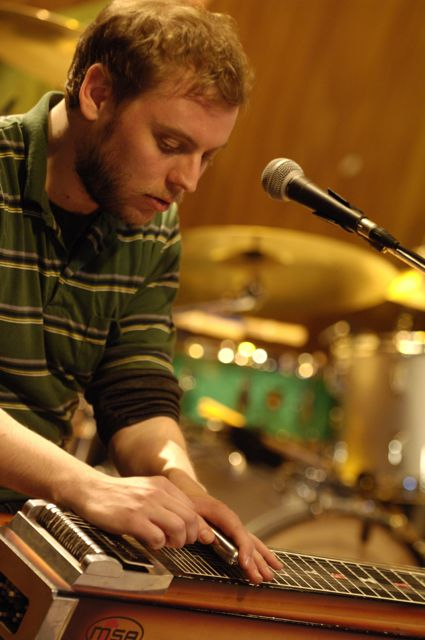
- Dale Murray playing Pedal Steel in the CBC studio in Ottawa

Background information
- Origin: Dartmouth, Nova Scotia, Canada
- Genres: Indie rock, folk rock, country
- Occupations: Singer-songwriter, musician
- Instruments: Guitar, vocals, pedal steel, lap steel, Dobro, keyboards
- Years active: 1995–present
- Website: www.myspace.com/dalemurray

Dale Murray is a Canadian singer-songwriter and musician. He has been a guitarist and vocalist for the indie rock band Cuff the Duke, and releases solo material under his own name.

== Biography ==
Murray resides in Dartmouth, Nova Scotia, and is the nephew of Anne Murray.

In the late 1990s, along with Ruth Minnikin and Matt Mays, Murray formed The Guthries. They released two albums, Off Windmill in 2000, and the self-titled The Guthries in 2002. The band toured extensively throughout Canada and the UK. Following the release of their second album, the band members each began pursuing solo projects, and have not released another Guthries album.

Murray released his first solo album, Brighter Lives, Darker Side, in 2005.

In 2005, Murray, Nathan Lawr, Ryan Bishops, Ruth Minnikin and Kate Maki participated in two national concert tours, A Midautumn Night's Dream and A Midwinter Night's Dream, which were reportedly inspired by Bob Dylan's Rolling Thunder Revue. The five musicians also recorded limited edition albums for sale on each tour.

In late 2005, Murray became a member of Cuff the Duke. In 2008, Murray toured extensively with Cuff the Duke acting as Hayden's backing band.

His second solo album, Dream Mountain Dream, was released in 2012.

He has not released further albums as a solo artist since 2012, but has continued to work as a session musician and collaborator with his wife, singer-songwriter Christina Martin, as well as other artists.

== Discography ==
Murray has played on many records as session musician or guest artist. The following records are those on which he is credited as a fully contributing band member or composer.

- Yarn (1996) – Booming Airplanes
- Put Paul First (2000) – Paul Bellini
- Off Windmill (2000) – The Guthries
- The Guthries (2002) – The Guthries
- La Nouvelle Gauche (2002) – The Hylozoists
- Matt Mays (2002) – Matt Mays
- Talkin' Honky Blues (2003) – Buck 65
- EP (2003) – Ruth Minnikin
- Marooned and Blue (2004) – Ruth Minnikin
- The Sun Will Find Us (2004) – Kate Maki
- Brighter Lives, Darker Side (2005) – Dale Murray
- Secret House Against the World (2005) – Buck 65
- The Life and Hard Times of Guy Terrifico (soundtrack) (2005)
- Matt Mays & El Torpedo (2005) – Matt Mays & El Torpedo
- Cuff the Duke (2005) – Cuff the Duke
- Secret Carpentry (2005) – Nathan Lawr
- La Fin du Monde (2006) – The Hylozoists
- When the Angels Make Contact (2006) – Matt Mays
- Sidelines of the City (2007) – Cuff the Duke
- Little Jabs (2007) – Two Hours Traffic
- Orchestra for the Moon (2007) – Jenn Grant
- On High (2008) – Kate Maki
- In Field & Town (2008) – Hayden
- Terminal Romance (2008) – Matt Mays & El Torpedo
- The Heavy Blinkers – The Heavy Blinkers
- Better Weather – The Heavy Blinkers
- The Night and I Are Still So Young – The Heavy Blinkers
- Hopeful Monster – Hopeful Monster
- Can't Sleep This One Off – Adam Puddington
- For the Meantime – Adam Puddington
- Back in Town – Adam Puddington
- Nothing Is Where It Was – Norma MacDonald
- Country Soul – The Hurtin' Unit
- Bottom of a Heart – Sherry Ryan
- Lost Balloons – Caledonia
- Wandering Midnight – Gabe Minnikin
- Things Have Changed – David Myles
- Nothing Stays the Same – Jason Haywood
- Songs of Brendan Flynn – Brendan Flynn
- Emergence – Dave Carmichael
- Miss Canada – Little Miss Moffat
- You Ain't Getting My Country – The Divorcees
- Two Hearts – Christina Martin
