= Paul Lowman =

Canadian musician

- Born: Paul Lowman; Oshawa, Ontario, Canada
- Genres: Indie rock, folk rock
- Occupation: Musician
- Instrument(s): Bass guitar, vocals, guitar, violin, piano, lap steel
- Years active: 1999–present

Paul Lowman is a Canadian musician. He is the bass player for Cuff the Duke.

== Biography ==
Lowman grew up in Oshawa, Ontario, where he played with fellow Cuff the Duke member Wayne Petti. As Cuff the Duke picked up, he moved to Toronto. Aside from Cuff the Duke, he has also played on albums by The Hylozoists and Hayden.

== Discography ==
- Life Stories for Minimum Wage (2002) – Cuff the Duke
- Cuff the Duke (2005) – Cuff the Duke
- Sidelines of the City (2007) – Cuff the Duke
- In Field & Town (2008) – Hayden
- La Fin Du Monde (2006) – The Hylozoists
