= Everything I Long For =

Studio album by Hayden
- Released: March 1, 1995
- Recorded: February 1994 – January 1995; Hayden's room, Thornhill, Ontario (tracks 3–5, 7–8, 10–11, 13–14); Umbrella Sound, The Dubhouse, Toronto (tracks 1, 6, 9, 12); CrazyHead Studios, Toronto (track 2)
- Genre: Acoustic rock, indie folk, alternative country, folk rock
- Length: 60:52
- Label: Hardwood; Sonic Unyon; Outpost
- Producer: Hayden (tracks 2–5, 7–8, 10–11, 13–14); Hayden and Joao Carvalho (tracks 1, 6, 9, 12)

Hayden chronology
In September (1994)	Everything I Long For (1995)	The Closer I Get (1998)

Singles from Everything I Long For
- 1. "Bad as They Seem" Released: June 1996

Professional ratings
Review scores
Source	Rating
AllMusic	4.5/5 stars
Dayton Daily News	1/4 stars
The Encyclopedia of Popular Music	3/5 stars
Entertainment Weekly	C
Exclaim!	9/10
Fort Worth Star-Telegram	4/5 stars
Pitchfork	8.9/10
Rolling Stone	3/5 stars
The Village Voice	B
Wall of Sound	70/100

Everything I Long For is the debut album by Canadian singer-songwriter Hayden. It was initially released in Canada on March 1, 1995 through his own label, Hardwood Records, in conjunction with Sonic Unyon. It was later re-released in May 1996 (with slightly modified cover art) internationally on Outpost Recordings/Geffen Records. A 12" vinyl version was also released in 1996 on Hardwood/Genius Records.

The song "Assignment in Space with Rip Foster" is an alternative title to the children's novel Rip Foster Rides the Gray Planet by Harold L. Goodwin. Assignment in Space with Rip Foster is also attributed in the liner notes of Hayden's debut album, In September, as the recording studio where he recorded part of that album.

== Bad as They Seem ==
The song "Bad as They Seem" was released as a single, and the music video received some play on MuchMusic and MTV's 120 Minutes.

The lyrics are from the point of view of a young twenty-something man in a hopeless situation: working a dead-end job ("where [he worked] at fourteen"), still living at his parents' home ("until [he's] at least forty-three"), infatuated with a 16-year-old "girl of [his] dreams", and possibly infatuated with the girl's mother, as well. The man wishes for a life where he can go out and meet someone to be his "better half". The hopeless and depressing nature of the song is reiterated with each verse, which states that "things are as bad as they seem". The third verse of the song ("Job of my dreams…") is absent from the album's reissues.

Desser shared on the Toronto Mike'd podcast that the performance sections of the video were filmed at The Rivoli bar with the backroom concert space made to look like a bedroom. After the video shoot, Hayden and the video audience walked to Ogden Jr Public School where Desser played an impromptu acoustic concert.

== Track listing ==
All songs written by Paul Hayden Desser.

1. "Bad as They Seem" – 3:31
2. "In September" – 2:38
3. "We Don't Mind" – 4:35
4. "Tragedy" – 3:57
5. "Stem" – 1:47
6. "Skates" – 7:18
7. "I'm to Blame" – 2:25
8. "Assignment in Space with Rip Foster" – 2:37
9. "Driveway" – 4:20
10. "Hardly" – 4:13
11. "You Were Loved" – 2:48
12. "When This Is Over" – 4:00
13. "My Parent's House" – 4:35
14. "Lounging" – 4:27

=== Original track listing ===
This is the track listing of the original 1995 Hardwood Records release, which is now out of print.

1. "Bad as They Seem" – 4:34^{†}
2. "In September" – 2:38
3. "We Don't Mind" – 4:35
4. "Tragedy" – 3:57
5. "Stem" – 1:47
6. "Skates" – 7:18
7. "I'm to Blame" – 2:25
8. "Assignment in Space with Rip Foster" – 2:37
9. "Driveway" – 4:20
10. "Hardly" – 4:13
11. "You Were Loved" – 2:48
12. "When This Is Over" – 4:00
13. "Bunkbed" – 4:14
14. "I Almost Cried" – 3:33
15. "My Parent's House" – 4:35
16. "Lounging" – 4:27
0. Kraft Dinner & Poledo's Club Sandwich (hidden track)

† As mentioned above, the original "Bad as They Seem" has one verse more than on subsequent releases

== Personnel ==
- Hayden – vocals, guitar (acoustic and electric), harmonica, piano, accordion
  - producer (all tracks), mixing (all tracks)
- Joao Carvalho – drums on "Bad as They Seem", "Skates", "Driveway", "When This Is Over"; bass on "Bad as They Seem"
  - producer (tracks 1, 6, 9, 12), mixing (1, 3–14), mastering (all tracks)
- Bryan Richards – drums on "In September"
- Guy Cannotplayit – cello on "Hardly"
- Blaine Johnson – mixing (track 2)

== Release history ==
Region	Date	Label	Format	Catalog
Canada	1995	Hardwood	CD	
International	1996	Outpost/Geffen/Universal	CD	
United States and Canada	1996	Hardwood/Genius	12" vinyl	
