= City Lights Align =

Studio album by Wayne Petti
- Released: 13 March 2007
- Genre: Indie
- Length: 29:24
- Label: Outside Music
- Producer: Wayne Petti and Paul Aucoin

City Lights Align is the first solo album by Canadian musician Wayne Petti, released 13 March 2007. The album was released by Outside Music.

== Track listing ==
1. "Falling Behind" – 1:32
2. "Moment by Moment" – 2:46
3. "Here Is My Heart" – 2:17
4. "Price To Pay" – 2:40
5. "I'll Be With You" – 2:20
6. "I Wait" – 2:50
7. "The Only Only One" – 3:29 – Written by J. Dragonetti
8. "Up on the Hillside" – 3:29
9. "Lost Without You" – 3:16
10. "All of the Time" – 2:25
11. "Night Sky" – 2:27

== Personnel ==
- Wayne Petti – All songs
- Paul Aucoin – recording
- Noah Mintz – mastering
- Stewart Jones – artwork
- Alex Durlak – Layout
