= Sidelines of the City =

Studio album by Cuff the Duke
- Released: October 23, 2007
- Genre: Indie rock/alternative country
- Length: 38:44
- Label: Hardwood
- Producer: Cuff the Duke and Paul Aucoin

Cuff the Duke chronology
Cuff the Duke (2005)	Sidelines of the City (2007)	Way Down Here (2009)

Professional ratings
Review scores
Source	Rating
Allmusic	link
Eye Weekly	link
Now	link

Sidelines of the City is the third album by Canadian indie rock band Cuff the Duke, released on October 23, 2007.

== Track listing ==
1. "If I Live or If I Die" – 3:42
2. "Surging Revival" – 4:04
3. "Failure to Some" – 7:01
4. "Remember the Good Times" – 2:47
5. "The Ballad of the Tired Old Man" – 4:06
6. "Long Road" – 3:51
7. "When All Else Fails & Fades" – 2:15
8. "By Winter's End" – 4:12
9. "Rossland Square" – 3:00
10. "Confessions from a Parkdale Basement" – 3:46

== Personnel ==
- Paul Lowman – bass, piano, fiddle, vocals
- Dale Murray – guitar, pedal steel, vocals, engineer
- Wayne Petti – vocals, guitar, Moog, bass (track 2)
- Corey Wood – drums, percussion
- Paul Aucoin – producer, engineer, organ (4, 5, 6, 8), glockenspiel (3)
- Shaun Brodie – trumpet (5)
- Nathan Lawr – drums (1, 6, 10)
- Andrew McCormack – drums (4, 8, 9)
- Alana Stuart – vocals (1)
- Jason Tait – drums (2, 5), percussion, (1), saw (2)
- Lorne Houndsel – mixing
- Francois Turenne – engineer
- Noah Mintz – mastering
