= Cuff the Duke (album) =

Studio album by Cuff the Duke
- Released: July 26, 2005
- Recorded: Unknown
- Genres: indie rock, alternative country
- Length: 43:06
- Label: Hardwood Records
- Producers: Paul Aucoin, Cuff the Duke

Cuff the Duke chronology
Life Stories for Minimum Wage (2002)	Cuff the Duke (2005)	Sidelines of the City (2007)

Professional ratings
Review scores
Source	Rating
AllMusic	4/5 stars

The album Cuff the Duke is the band's second full-length release. Recorded and mixed in Toronto at The Woodshed, Hallamusic and Chemical Sound. This album contains a re-recording of the track Anti-Social which first appeared on Life Stories for Minimum Wage.

The album was reissued on vinyl in 2018.

== Track listing ==
1. "The Future Hangs" – 3:46
2. "I Really Want to Help You" – 3:38
3. "Take My Money and Run" – 2:55
4. "No Sleep, No Heat" – 5:36
5. "The Ballad of Poor John Henry" – 4:08
6. "Anti-Social" – 3:48
7. "There Was a Time" – 4:26
8. "Belgium or Peru" – 3:21
9. "Meet You on the Other Side" – 4:16
10. "A Long Night My Love" – 1:38
11. "It's Over" – 5:34

== Personnel ==
- Wayne Petti - vocals, guitar, harmonica, piano
- Jeff Peers - guitar, Moog, organ
- Paul Lowman - bass, piano, vocals
- Matt Faris - drums, percussion
- Isla Craig - backing vocals
- Jay Ball - backing vocals
- Paul Aucoin - producer, engineer, mixing (3, 5, 7, 9), string and horn arrangements
- Julie Penner - strings
- Owen Pallett - strings
- Michael Olsen - strings
- James Heidebrecht - mixing
- Chris Shreenan - engineer
- Dyck and Francois Turenne - engineer
- Noah Mintz - mastering
