= Brennschluss =

Brennschluss (a loanword, from the German Brennschluss) is either the cessation of fuel burning in a rocket or the time that the burning ceases: the cessation may result from the consumption of the propellants, from deliberate shutoff, or from some other cause. After Brennschluss, the rocket is subject only to external forces, notably that due to gravity.

According to Walter Dornberger, Brennschluss literally meant "end of burning," He goes on to state, "the German word is preferred to the form 'all-burnt,' which is used in England, because at Brennschluss considerable quantities of fuel may still be left in the tanks."

== Cultural references ==
The term Brennschluss is used in various English literary works, including:

- The science fiction short story Honeymoon in Hell (1950) by Fredric Brown
- The science fiction short story Desire No More (1954) by Algis Budrys
- The novel Gravity's Rainbow (1973) by Thomas Pynchon
- The science fiction novel Rip Foster Rides the Gray Planet (1952) written by Harold L. Goodwin (under the pseudonym Blake Savage)
- The science fiction novel The Rolling Stones (also called Space Family Stone) (1952) by Robert A. Heinlein
- The science fiction novel Double Star (1956) by Robert A. Heinlein
- The science fiction short story "Delivery Guaranteed" by Robert Silverberg
- The science fiction novel Fiasco (1986) by Stanislaw Lem
