= Wayne Petti =

Canadian singer-songwriter

- Born: Wayne Anthony Petti; Oshawa, Ontario, Canada
- Genres: Indie rock, folk rock
- Occupation: Singer-songwriter
- Instruments: Guitar, vocals, keyboards, harmonica
- Years active: 1999–present
- Label: Outside Music
- Member of: Cuff the Duke
- Website: www.myspace.com/waynepetti

Wayne Anthony Petti is a Canadian singer-songwriter best known the vocalist for indie rock band Cuff the Duke. He has contributed to projects by Blue Rodeo, The Hylozoists and Hayden in addition to releasing material on his own and as part of his side-project Grey Lands.

== Biography ==
Petti grew up in Oshawa, Ontario, where he played with fellow Cuff the Duker Paul Lowman. After living for several years in Toronto, Petti relocated to Hamilton in 2014 where he lives with his wife and their son.

Petti released his first solo album, City Lights Align, in 2007 on Outside Music. He has also played with The Hylozoists.

== Discography ==
- Life Stories for Minimum Wage (2002) – Cuff the Duke
- Cuff the Duke (2005) – Cuff the Duke
- La Fin Du Monde (2006) – The Hylozoists
- Sidelines of the City (2007) – Cuff the Duke
- City Lights Align (2007) – Wayne Petti
- Way Down Here (2009) – Cuff the Duke
- The Things We Left Behind (2009) – Blue Rodeo
- Morning Comes – (2011) – Cuff the Duke
- In Our Time – EP – (2011) – Cuff the Duke
- Union – 2012 – Cuff the Duke
- In Our Nature – (2013) – Blue Rodeo
- Songs by Other People (2014) – Grey Lands
- Right Arm (2015) – Grey Lands
