= In September =

Studio album by Hayden
- Released: 1994 (Canada)
- Recorded: Crazyhead Studios and Assignment in Space with Rip Foster
- Genre: Acoustic rock Alt country Folk rock
- Label: Paul Records; Hardwood Records
- Producer: Hayden

Hayden chronology
In September (1994)	Everything I Long For (1995)

Alternative cover

In September is the debut album by Canadian singer-songwriter Hayden. It was released on cassette by both Paul Records and Hardwood Records, with different artwork for the two releases. The Hardwood Records release did not contain two tracks that were on the Paul Records release.

Many of these songs reappear on Hayden's subsequent and much-acclaimed release, Everything I Long For.

== Track listing ==
All songs written by Paul Hayden Desser.

1. "Game"
2. "In September"
3. "Hardly"
4. "On & On"
5. "Bunkbed"
6. "Careful"
7. "Bad as They Seem"
8. "Life's Like"
9. "Less Than"
10. "Stem"
11. "Cause Me Pain"
12. "My Parents' House"
