= The Old Fashioned Way =

The Old Fashioned Way may refer to:

- The Old Fashioned Way (film), a 1934 film starring W. C. Fields
- The Old Fashioned Way (song), the English version of Charles Aznavour's song Les plaisirs démodés

== See also ==
- Old Fashioned Way, a song by Canadian singer-songwriter Hayden on the EP Moving Careful
