= Mild and Hazy =

"Mild" and "Hazy"

Single by Hayden
- Released: 1996
- Genre: Acoustic rock Alt country Folk rock
- Length: 1:04 / 1:06
- Label: Hardwood / Lunamoth
- Songwriter(s): Paul Hayden Desser; Black Francis on "Gouge Away"

Hayden singles chronology
"Bad as They Seem" (1995)	"Mild" and "Hazy" (1996)	"Lunar Landing Confirmed (split with Poledo)" (1996)

Mild and Hazy is a 7" vinyl single by the Canadian singer-songwriter Hayden. It was released in 1996 on Hayden's own label, Hardwood Records as well as on Lunamoth. The cover is a photograph of Hayden as a toddler. The song "Gouge Away" is a cover of the Pixies' song, from their album Doolittle.

== Track listing ==
All songs written by Paul Hayden Desser, except where noted.

Side A:

1. "In September" – 2:38
2. "Mild" – 1:04

Side B:

1. "Gouge Away" (Black Francis) – 2:48
2. "Hazy" – 1:06
