= Isla Craig =

Canadian singer-songwriter

Isla Craig is a Canadian vocalist and songwriter based in Toronto, Ontario.

Growing up Craig was influenced by choral performances at her church and by her mother who sings and plays the organ and piano.

Craig frequently collaborates with and sings backup vocals for other performers, including Jennifer Castle and Meg Remy. Craig sang on The Cosmic Range's debut New Latitudes (2016). She is a former Bruce Peninsula vocalist. She was also a member of the duo OG Melody with Thom Gill.

Craig's first album, Both the one & the other (2012), featured Canadian vocalists Daniela Gesundheit, Tamara Lindeman, Ivy Mairi, and Felicity Williams. The group worked together again on her second release Becoming (2018). Her third album, Echo's Reach was released in 2022.

== Albums ==
- Both the one & the other (2012)
- Becoming (2018)
- Echo's Reach (2022)

=== Vocals ===
- Cuff the Duke - Cuff the Duke (2005)
- Snowblink – Long Live (2010)
- Cosmic Range - New Latitudes (2016)
- Jennifer Castle - Angels Of Death (2018)
- Lido Pimienta – Miss Colombia (2020)
