= Us Alone =

Studio album by Hayden
- Released: February 5, 2013
- Genres: Acoustic rock, indie folk, alternative country, folk rock
- Label: Arts & Crafts

Hayden chronology
The Place Where We Lived (2009)	Us Alone (2013)	Hey Love (2015)

Us Alone is the seventh studio album by Canadian singer-songwriter Hayden, released February 5, 2013 on Arts & Crafts.

Hayden has previously released all of his albums in Canada on his own Hardwood Records label, but he announced in November 2012 that he had signed to Arts & Crafts.

Singer-songwriter Lou Canon, Hayden's sister-in-law, appears as a duet vocalist on the track "Blurry Nights".

The album was named a longlisted nominee for the 2013 Polaris Music Prize on June 13, 2013. The album was a shortlisted nominee for the Juno Award for Adult Alternative Album of the Year at the Juno Awards of 2014.

== Track listing ==
No.	Title	Length
1.	"Motel"	5:52
2.	"Just Give Me a Name"	4:10
3.	"Blurry Nights"	4:16
4.	"Old Dreams"	4:38
5.	"Almost Everything"	5:13
6.	"Oh Memory"	5:39
7.	"Rainy Saturday"	3:12
8.	"Instructions"	11:47
