= Live at Convocation Hall =

Live album by Hayden
- Released: 17 September 2002
- Recorded: 9 March 2002
- Genre: Acoustic rock Alt country Folk rock
- Length: 82:24
- Label: Hardwood/Universal Music Canada (Canada)

Hayden chronology
Skyscraper National Park (2001)	Live at Convocation Hall (2002)	Elk-Lake Serenade (2004)

Professional ratings
Aggregate scores
Source	Rating
Metacritic	79/100
Review scores
Source	Rating
AllMusic	4/5 stars
Stylus Magazine	B

Live at Convocation Hall is a live album by Canadian singer-songwriter Hayden, released in 2002 on Hardwood Records and Universal Music Canada.

The album was recorded at the University of Toronto's Convocation Hall.

== Track listing ==
All songs written by Paul Hayden Desser, except where noted.

=== Disc One ===
1. "Streetcar" – 4:53
2. "I Should Have Been Watching You" – 3:12
3. "Steps into Miles" – 3:12
4. "The Hazards of Sitting Beneath Palm Trees" – 3:32
5. "Holster" – 4:20
6. "Middle of July" – 2:32
7. "Between Us to Hold" – 2:50
8. "I'm to Blame" – 2:29
9. "Bass Song" – 4:51
10. "We Don't Mind" – 5:17
11. "Stem" – 2:14

=== Disc Two ===
1. "Two Doors" – 5:17
2. "I Don't Think We Should Ever Meet" – 3:21
3. "Woody" – 1:37
4. "Long Way Down" – 4:32
5. "All in One Move" – 1:59
6. "Bad as They Seem" – 4:22
7. "Lullaby" – 7:25
8. "Pots and Pans" – 3:26
9. "Trees Lounge" (Desser, Steve Buscemi) – 4:05
10. "Tell Me Why" (Neil Young) – 3:53
11. "Carried Away" – 3:13
