= The Place Where We Lived =

Studio album by Hayden
- Released: May 26, 2009
- Recorded: 4 Walls Studios, Skyscraper National Park
- Genre: Acoustic rock, indie folk, alternative country, folk rock
- Length: 30:04
- Label: Hardwood/Universal Music Canada (Canada)
- Producer: Howie Beck

Hayden chronology
| In Field & Town (2008) | The Place Where We Lived (2009) | Us Alone (2013) |

Professional ratings
Review scores
| Source | Rating |
|---|---|
| Straight.com | link |
| The Vancouver Sun | link |
| PopMatters | link |
| cokemachineglow | (78%) link |

The Place Where We Lived is the sixth album by Canadian singer-songwriter Hayden, released May 26, 2009 on Hardwood Records and Universal Music Canada.

The album was not heavily promoted, and Hayden did not undertake an extensive concert tour to support it. Upon the release of his follow-up album Us Alone, he joked that "I think I realized that you need to let people know you have a record out."

== Track listing ==
| No. | Title | Length |
|---|---|---|
| 1. | "The Place Where We Lived" | 3:26 |
| 2. | "Message from London" | 3:14 |
| 3. | "Disappear" | 2:32 |
| 4. | "Living Grows on You" | 1:59 |
| 5. | "When the Night Came and Took Us" | 3:10 |
| 6. | "Let's Break Up" | 3:06 |
| 7. | "The Valley" | 1:48 |
| 8. | "Dilapidated Heart" | 5:20 |
| 9. | "Never Lonely" | 3:01 |
| 10. | "Let it Last" | 2:28 |
