= The Closer I Get =

Studio album by Hayden
- Released: 12 May 1998
- Recorded: Adelaide St. W. (Tracks 12, 13); The Bathouse (Tracks 5, 8); Bearsville (Tracks 4, 7, 10, 11); Chemical Sound (Tracks 1, 2, 12); John and Stu's (Tracks 3, 5, 8, 9); Louie's Clubhouse (Track 6); Oceanway (Track 6); St. John's Rd. (Tracks 4, 5, 9, 10, 11); Studio Litho (Tracks 3, 5, 8, 9)
- Genre: Acoustic rock, indie folk, alternative country, folk rock
- Length: 45:07
- Label: Hardwood Records/Universal Music Canada
- Producer: Hayden, Daryl Smith (Tracks 1, 2), Steve Fisk (Tracks 3, 5, 8, 9), John Hanlon (Tracks 4, 7, 10, 11), Scott Litt (Track 6)

Hayden chronology
Everything I Long For (1995)	The Closer I Get (1998)	Skyscraper National Park (2002)

Professional ratings
Review scores
Source	Rating
AllMusic	3/5 stars
The Encyclopedia of Popular Music	4/5 stars
Entertainment Weekly	B+
Now	2/5 stars
Pitchfork	7.1/10
Rolling Stone	3/5 stars
Spin	4/10

The Closer I Get is the second album by Canadian singer-songwriter Hayden. It is Hayden's first international release. In Canada it was released on Hardwood Records/Universal, while in the United States it was released on Outpost Recordings/Geffen/Universal.

The Closer I Get was released on vinyl by Hardwood Records for Record Store Day on April 19, 2014. At that time, It was the only studio album to have never been released on vinyl.

== Track listing ==
All songs written by Paul Hayden Desser.

1. "The Closer I Get" – 3:45
2. "Stride" – 2:46
3. "The Hazards of Sitting Beneath Palm Trees" – 2:44
4. "Bullet" – 5:09
5. "Waiting for a Chance to See Her" – 2:41
6. "Two Doors" – 5:11
7. "Between Us to Hold" – 2:07
8. "Better Off Inside" – 3:02
9. "Instrumental with Mellotron" – 2:23
10. "Memphis" – 3:37
11. "Nights Like These" – 2:48
12. "You Are All I Have" – 5:40
13. "I'll Tell Him Tonight" – 3:41
