= Life Stories for Minimum Wage =

Studio album by Cuff the Duke
- Released: October 15, 2002
- Recorded: Unknown
- Genre: indie rock, alternative country
- Length: 38:29
- Label: Hardwood Records
- Producer: Steve Krecklo, Lorne Hounsell

Cuff the Duke chronology
Life Stories for Minimum Wage (2002)	Cuff the Duke (2005)

Professional ratings
Review scores
Source	Rating
AllMusic	3.5/5 stars

The debut album from Cuff the Duke, titled Life Stories for Minimum Wage, was released in 2002 and recorded at Umbrella Sound and at The House of Miracles in Toronto and London, Ontario, Canada. The album was re-released in 2007 on Outside Music.

== Track listing ==
1. "Blackheart" – 4:55
2. "Hey Baby" – 2:06
3. "The Difference Between Us" – 2:58
4. "Hobo Night Stalker" – 3:59
5. "Long Winter" – 3:52
6. "Lonely Path" – 2:07
7. "Ballad of a Lonely Construction Worker" – 5:23
8. "Anti-Social" – 3:41
9. "Head Smashed In Buffalo Jump" – 2:49
10. "The Trouble and the Truth" – 6:39

A "deluxe edition" of the album was released to iTunes in 2012, featuring two additional tracks not on the original release, "This City Will Eat You" and "Burger". In addition, the band previously distributed "Deciding on Luther", an unreleased track from the original recording sessions for the album, as a free download from its website.

== Personnel ==
- Brad Fudge - drums, percussion, artwork
- Paul Lowman - bass, guitar, lap steel
- Wayne Petti - lead vocals, guitar, harmonica
- Jeff Peers - guitar, bells, Moog Opus III, Crumar Stratus, wind organ, Hammond organ
- Steve Krecklo - producer, backing vocals, piano, Moog Opus III, guitar, percussion, lap steel
- Lorne Hounsell - producer, engineer
- Andy Magoffin - producer, engineer (tracks 4 and 7)
- Joao Carvalho - mastering
