= Elk-Lake Serenade =

Elk Lake Serenade

Studio album by Hayden
- Released: 18 May 2004 (Canada / USA), 16 August 2004 (UK), August 2004 (Australia / NZ)
- Genre: Acoustic rock, alternative country, indie folk, folk rock
- Length: 48:29
- Label: Hardwood/Universal Music Canada (Canada), Badman Recording Company (USA), Loose Music (UK), SPUNK (Australia / NZ)

Hayden chronology
Live at Convocation Hall (2002)	Elk Lake Serenade (2004)	In Field & Town (2008)

Professional ratings
Aggregate scores
Source	Rating
Metacritic	79/100
Review scores
Source	Rating
AllMusic	4.5/5 stars
Guardian Unlimited	4/5 stars
The Independent	4/5 stars
Jam!	(ambivalent)
Pitchfork Media	(6.8/10)
PopMatters (1)	(favourable)
PopMatters (2)	(ambivalent)
Q	4/5 stars
The Sunday Times (London)	4/5 stars

Elk-Lake Serenade is the fourth album by Canadian singer-songwriter Hayden. It was released on 18 May 2004 in Canada (on Hayden's own record label, Hardwood Records) and in the U.S. (on the Badman Recording Co.). It was released two months later in the UK on Loose Music, and in Australia and New Zealand on Spunk Records.

Elk Lake is a community in Northern Ontario.

== Track listing ==
All songs written by Paul Hayden Desser.

1. "Wide Eyes" – 2:12
2. "Home by Saturday" – 3:19
3. "Woody" – 1:53
4. "This Summer" – 2:56
5. "Hollywood Ending" – 2:55
6. "Robbed Blind" – 2:17
7. "Killbear" – 3:34
8. "Through the Rads" – 1:19
9. "Starting Over" – 2:31
10. "Don't Get Down" – 3:19
11. "Roll Down That Wave" – 1:38
12. "My Wife" – 3:02
13. "1939" – 4:45
14. "Elk-Lake Serenade" – 1:01
15. "Looking Back to Me" – 5:21
16. hidden track – 4:19 (begins approx. 2:14 after "Looking Back to Me")
