= Moonshine (Kate Maki album) =

Studio album by Kate Maki
- Released: May 24, 2011
- Genre: country folk
- Label: Confusion Unlimited
- Producer: Kate Maki

Kate Maki chronology
Two Song Wedding (2011)	Moonshine (2011)	Head in the Sand (2016)

Moonshine is the fifth album by Canadian singer-songwriter Kate Maki, released in May 2011. The album was released independently on Maki's own Confusion Unlimited label, with distribution by Outside Music.

Guest musicians include Nathan Lawr, Dale Murray and members of Cuff the Duke.

== Track listing ==
1. "Lose My Mind"
2. "The Signal"
3. "Hanging On"
4. "Shine On My Mind"
5. "Fade To Grey"
6. "Boredom Blues"
7. "Fought The Cattle"
8. "Golden Thorns"
9. "When I Go"
10. "Ode"
