= Skyscraper National Park =

Studio album by Hayden
- Released: October 16, 2001 (Canada), March 12, 2002 (U.S.A.), September 2, 2002 (U.K.), November 18, 2002 (Japan)
- Genre: Acoustic rock, alternative country, indie folk, folk rock
- Length: 39:46
- Label: Hardwood Records/Universal Music Canada
- Producer: Hayden (Track 2 by Hayden, Kid Lunch, Mitch Roth, Damon Richardson & Marty Kinack)

Hayden chronology
The Closer I Get (1998)	Skyscraper National Park (2001)	Live at Convocation Hall (2002)

Professional ratings
Aggregate scores
Source	Rating
Metacritic	83/100
Review scores
Source	Rating
AllMusic	4/5 stars
Mojo	5/5 stars
Pitchfork	8.2/10
Q	3/5 stars
Stylus	7.1/10

Skyscraper National Park is the third album by Canadian singer-songwriter Hayden. It was released on Hardwood Records in Canada, on Badman Recording Co. in the U.S., on Loose Music in the U.K., and on Massive! in Japan. There were two limited-edition pressings of this album. The first, comprising only 100 copies, was mainly for Hayden's friends and family. The second, comprising 1,500 copies, was sold on Hayden's cross-Canada tour.

The album title comes from Kurt Vonnegut's novel Slapstick.

== Track listing ==
All songs written by Paul Hayden Desser.

1. "Mingus" - 3:39 (Hidden Pregap track on CD)
2. "Street Car" – 4:35
3. "Dynamite Walls" – 6:44
4. "Steps into Miles" – 2:57
5. "I Should Have Been Watching You" – 1:42
6. "Long Way Down" – 4:11
7. "Tea Pad" – 1:57
8. "All in One Move" – 1:18
9. "Bass Song" – 4:28
10. "Carried Away" – 2:44
11. "Looking for You in Me" – 3:36
12. "Lullaby" – 5:41
