= Jerk (album) =

Studio album by hHead
- Released: 1994
- Recorded: March 1994–August 1994 at Philo's Ranch in Mendocino, California
- Genre: Alternative rock, indie rock
- Length: 60:09
- Label: I.R.S.
- Producer: Dave Ogilvie

HHead chronology
Fireman (1992)	Jerk (1994)	Ozzy (1996)

Jerk is the second album by Canadian alternative/indie rock band hHead, released in 1994. The prize money that hHead won from a CFNY-FM contest went towards paying the costs for making this album. Videos were made for "Answers" and "Happy". AllMusic rated the album three out of five stars. A Washington Post review compared the album to Nirvana.

== Track listing ==
1. "Remedial" - 3:25
2. "Answers" - 3:52
3. "Happy" - 5:18
4. "University" - 3:22
5. "Gipped" - 5:19
6. "Jerk" - 4:00
7. "Love" - 4:05
8. "She's" - 4:38
9. "Better" - 4:30
10. "Stillborn" - 4:41
11. "Will" - 5:26
12. "Pimp" - 5:24
13. "Stain" - 5:09

== Credits ==
- Noah Mintz - Guitar/Vocals
- Brendan Canning - Bass
- Mark Bartkiw - drums
- Dave Ogilvie - Producer, Engineer
- Lewis Dimitri - Assistant Engineer
- Aubry Mintz - hHead Logo
- Allison Leach - Cover Photo
- Howie Wineberg - Mastering
- Vicky Law (Fai Cheung) - HK Journalist
