= La Fin du Monde =

La Fin Du Monde is French for "The end of the world". It may refer to:

- La Fin du Monde (album), an album by The Hylozoists
- La Fin du Monde (beer), a beer brewed by Quebec brewery Unibroue
- La Fin du monde (book), a science fiction novel published in 1894 by Camille Flammarion and translated into English under the title Omega: The Last Days of the World
- La Fin du monde (film) (End of the World), a 1931 film directed by Abel Gance
- La Fin Absolue du Monde, a fictional film which is the focus of the 2005 Masters of Horror episode "Cigarette Burns"

== See also ==
- La fin du monde est à 7 heures, a Quebec satirical news television show
