= Moving Careful =

EP by Hayden
- Released: 1996 (Canada)
- Recorded: April 1 – May 1, 1996
- Genre: Acoustic rock Alt country Folk rock
- Length: 16:30 (73:56 with hidden track rain recording)
- Label: Sonic Unyon/Hardwood Records

Hayden chronology
Lunar Landing Confirmed (7" w/ Poledo) (1996)	Moving Careful (1996)	Carry On Mentality (7") (1997)

Professional ratings
Review scores
Source	Rating
Allmusic	3/5 stars
Fretplay	4.5/5 stars

Moving Careful is an EP by Canadian singer-songwriter Hayden. It was released in Canada on Sonic Unyon/Hardwood Records and later issued on 10" vinyl through Hardwood Records.

== Track listing ==
All songs written by Paul Hayden Desser.

1. "Pots and Pans" – 2:34
2. "Stride" – 2:47
3. "Middle of July" – 2:26
4. "Old Fashioned Way" – 2:35
5. "Half for Me" – 3:24
6. "Choking" – 2:36
7. "You Are All I Have" – 57:48
- The song "You Are All I Have" is 6:04 long. The hidden track "Winter Trip" begins at 8:44, after 2 minutes and 40 seconds of silence. The hidden track ends at minute 12:45 and begins a looped recording of the rain for 45 minutes
