= The Sun Will Find Us =

Studio album by Kate Maki
- Released: 2004
- Genre: folk rock
- Label: Confusion Unlimited
- Producer: Kate Maki, Dave Draves

Kate Maki chronology
Confusion Unlimited (2003)	The Sun Will Find Us (2004)	On High (2008)

The Sun Will Find Us is the second album by Canadian singer-songwriter Kate Maki, released in 2004. The album was released independently with distribution by Outside Music.

Guest musicians on the album include Nathan Lawr, Dale Murray, Ruth Minnikin and Ryan Bishops.

The song "To Get Across" was featured in the 2007 film Weirdsville, and in a 2013 episode of the television series Hard Rock Medical.

The album won the Album of the Year award at the Northern Ontario Music and Film Awards in 2005.

== Track listing ==
1. "First Impression"
2. "One by One"
3. "Wait in Rain"
4. "Old Guitar"
5. "Forever Blue"
6. "Defend the End"
7. "Another Storm"
8. "Someone Better"
9. "Sweet Time"
10. "Mid March Blues"
11. "To Get Across"
