= Union (Cuff the Duke album) =

Studio album by Cuff the Duke
- Released: October 2, 2012
- Genre: Alternative country, folk rock
- Label: Paper Bag Records

Cuff the Duke chronology
In Our Time (2012)	Union (2012)	In Our Time, Vol. II (2013)

Union is the sixth studio album by Canadian country rock band Cuff the Duke, released October 2, 2012 on Paper Bag Records.

The band considers the album to be the second part of a two-part album, paired with its 2011 album Morning Comes. The tracks "Side by Side" and "Stay" also feature guest vocals by Basia Bulat.

== Track listing ==
1. "Live My Life"
2. "Side By Side"
3. "Where Did We Go Wrong"
4. "Open Your Mind"
5. "Stay"
6. "Carry On"
7. "Something for Free"
8. "All I Want"
9. "Rise Above"
10. "Night After Night"
