= Two Song Wedding =

Studio album by Kate Maki
- Released: January 12, 2010
- Genre: folk
- Label: Confusion Unlimited
- Producer: Kate Maki

Kate Maki chronology
| On High (2008) | Two Song Wedding (2010) | Moonshine (2011) |

Two Song Wedding is the fourth album by Canadian singer-songwriter Kate Maki, released January 12, 2010. The album was released independently on Maki's own Confusion Unlimited label, with distribution by Outside Music.

Guest musicians include members of Giant Sand, Calexico, FemBots, Jonathan Richman and Arcade Fire.

The song "Bloodshot & Blistered" was featured in the film Ingenious from 2009.

== Track listing ==
1. "Bloodshot & Blistered"
2. "In Comes the Light"
3. "From Below"
4. "Message Delivered"
5. "Rage in a Cage"
6. "Carved in Sand"
7. "Rip Out the Moon"
8. "Upon a Time"
9. "Dig You a Grave"
10. "Crossfire"
