= Fireman (album) =

Studio album by hHead
- Released: 1993
- Genre: Alternative rock
- Length: 43:23
- Labels: Independent; I.R.S.

HHead chronology
| Fireman (1993) | Jerk (1994) |

Professional ratings
Review scores
| Source | Rating |
|---|---|
| AllMusic | 2/5 stars |

Fireman is the first album by the Canadian alternative rock band hHead. It was released in 1993 (then re-released in 1994 by I.R.S. Records). The album was a success on Canada's independent record charts, selling more than 10,000 copies.

It was first released independently as a cassette by hHead themselves and then released under Jam Entertainment Records. After hHead signed to I.R.S. in 1994 to release Jerk, they also re-released the CD version of Fireman. There was also a version that had 14 tracks (Under Jam Entertainment Records).

The album was recorded in a few days in northern California. Video clips for "Flower" and "Collide" were made. hHead supported the album with a Canadian tour. Fireman helped the band win $100,000 from CFNY-FM.

== Track listing ==
1. "Superstar" - 5:23
2. "Collide" - 4:03
3. "Fireman" - 3:43
4. "Jockstrap" - 4:17
5. "Burn" - 4:07^
6. "Flower" - 5:28
7. "Brain" - 5:13^
8. "Parking" - 3:57
9. "Moron" - 7:12
- Brain was only released on the cassette and 14-track version of the album.

== Alternate Track Listing ==
1. "Superstar" - 5:23
2. "Collide" - 4:03
3. "Fireman" - 3:43
4. "Jockstrap" - 4:17
5. "Burn" - 4:07
6. "Flower" - 5:28
7. "Brain" - 5:13
8. "Parking" - 3:57
9. "Moron" - 7:12
10. "Shotgun" - 3:33
11. "Ohh" - 4:31
12. "'Dis" - 4:03
13. "Life" - 5:52
14. "Rat" - 4:43
