= Confusion Unlimited =

Studio album by Kate Maki
- Released: 2003
- Genre: alternative country
- Label: Confusion Unlimited
- Producer: Kate Maki, Dave Draves

Kate Maki chronology
Confusion Unlimited (2003)	The Sun Will Find Us (2004)

Confusion Unlimited is the debut album by Canadian singer-songwriter Kate Maki, released in 2003. The album was released independently with distribution by Outside Music.

According to Maki, most of the album's songs were written in response to her grief when shortly after breaking up with her then-boyfriend, she received news that her high school boyfriend and early musical mentor had died in a car accident.

Guest musicians on the album include Jim Bryson, Ryan Bishops, Dan Levecque and Fred Guignion.

The song "Strangest Dream" was featured in the 2004 film Wilby Wonderful, and the song "All Things Passed" was featured in an of the television series MVP in 2008.

The album won the award for Album of the Year at the Northern Ontario Music and Film Awards in 2004, and Maki won Songwriter of the Year for "Over".

== Track listing ==
1. "Over"
2. "Out Back"
3. "Strangest Dream"
4. "Many Thanks"
5. "Mid March Blues"
6. "To Be Good"
7. "Home"
8. "All Things Passed"
9. "Miles from Nowhere"
