= Kate Maki =

Canadian singer-songwriter

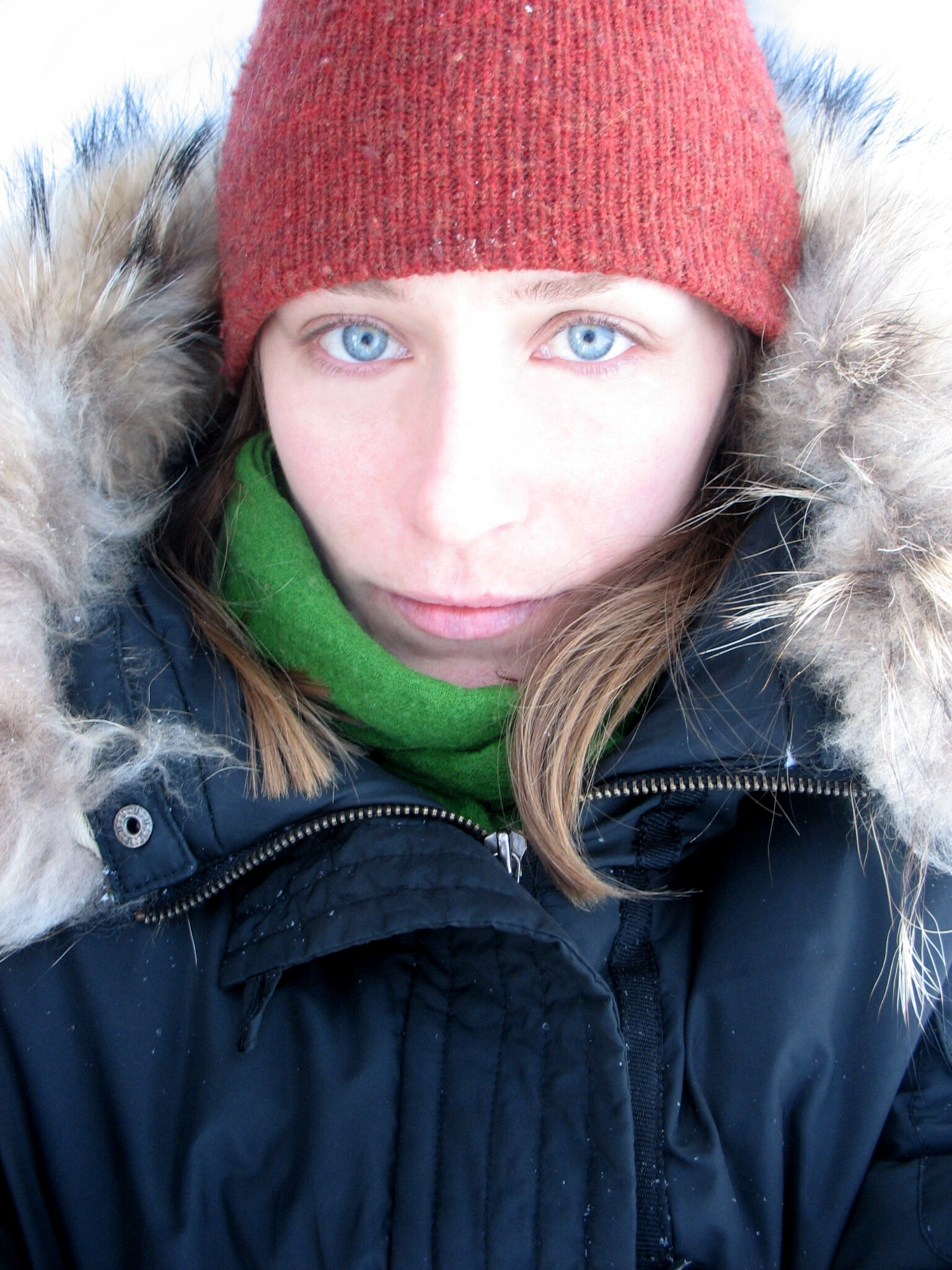

Background information
- Born: Katherine Ellen Maki
- Origin: Sudbury, Ontario, Canada
- Genres: folk, country, rock
- Occupation: singer-songwriter
- Instruments: vocals, guitar
- Years active: 2003–present
- Labels: Confusion Unlimited, OwOm
- Website: www.katemaki.com

Kate Maki (born Katherine Ellen Maki) is a Canadian singer-songwriter.

== Background ==
Maki is of Finnish descent. Born and raised in Sudbury, Ontario, she studied neuroscience at Dalhousie University in Halifax, Nova Scotia and education at Nipissing University in North Bay, Ontario. She taught special education, French and science in Ottawa, Toronto and Sudbury for several years before deciding to pursue a full-time musical career.

== Musical career ==
In 2003, Maki recorded her debut album, Confusion Unlimited, with Dave Draves at Little Bullhorn Studios in Ottawa. According to Maki, most of the album's songs were written in response to her grief when shortly after breaking up with her then-boyfriend, she received news that her high school boyfriend and early musical mentor had died in a car accident. The album's blend of folk rock and alternative country earned her favourable reviews, sparking comparisons to Kathleen Edwards, Neko Case and Sarah Harmer, and quickly sold out its initial printing. The album won the award for Album of the Year at the Northern Ontario Music and Film Awards in 2004, and Maki won Songwriter of the Year for "Over".

In 2004, she returned to Little Bullhorn Studios to record her second album, The Sun Will Find Us. The album again won the Album of the Year award at the Northern Ontario Music and Film Awards in 2005.

In 2005, Maki, Nathan Lawr, Ryan Bishops, Ruth Minnikin and Dale Murray participated in two national concert tours, A Midautumn Night's Dream and A Midwinter Night's Dream, which were reportedly inspired by Bob Dylan's Rolling Thunder Revue. The five musicians also recorded limited edition tour compilations for each tour.

Maki took a break from touring between 2006 and 2008 and returned home to Sudbury, Ontario to teach high school science.

In March 2007, Maki recorded her third album, On High, at Little Bullhorn Studios with Howe Gelb as producer and Dave Draves as engineer. It was released in North America on February 12, 2008, and was awarded Album of the Year at the Northern Ontario Music and Film Awards in 2009.

While touring the United States in 2008, Maki stopped at WaveLab in Tucson, Arizona for two days to record her fourth album, Two Song Wedding, which was released in January 2010.

In the fall of 2010, Maki and Frederick Squire travelled to Paco Loco Studio in El Puerto de Santa Maria to record two country songs. Calling It Quits/Crazy Tropical Survival Guide was released as a seven-inch two-song single and digital download on March 22, 2011.

After touring Canada together in 2011 in support of their seven-inch as well as Maki's fifth solo album, Moonshine, and Squire's second solo album, Frederick Squire Sings Shenandoah and Other Popular Hits, the duo decided to take a break from touring and settled in Copper Cliff, Ontario to start a family. Squire and Maki were married in 2012, separated then finally divorced in 2023.

In May 2016 she released the album Head in the Sand.

After a break of nine years during which she continued to teach, she returned in 2025 with the album Impossible Knot, an album whose lyrics centred in part on the dissolution of her marriage to Squire.

== Discography ==
=== Albums ===
- Confusion Unlimited (2003)
- The Sun Will Find Us (2004)
- On High (2008)
- Two Song Wedding (2010)
- Moonshine (2011)
- Head in the Sand (2016)
- Impossible Knot (2025)

=== Tour Compilations ===
- A Midwinter Night's Dream (2005)
- A Midautumn Night's Dream (2005)

=== Singles ===
- Calling It Quits/Crazy Tropical Survival Guide (2011, with Frederick Squire)

=== As Guest Musician ===
- vocals: "Cocaine Cowgirl" and "St. George's Lane" - Matt Mays - Matt Mays + El Torpedo (2004)
- vocals/electric guitar: "Covering Up" - Nathan Lawr - Secret Carpentry (2005)
- vocals: "Mountain of Love" - Howe Gelb - Sno Angel Like You (2006)
