= Ozzy (album) =

Studio album by hHead
- Released: 1996
- Studio: Sound of One Hand
- Genre: Alternative rock
- Length: 44:18
- Label: Handsome Boy

HHead chronology
Jerk (1994)	Ozzy (1996)

Ozzy is the third album by the Canadian band hHead, released in 1996. It was released on Handsome Boy Records, due to the closure of IRS Records, and was the band's final album. It was recorded at Sound of One Hand, in Ottawa, with Jason Ray joining on drums. "Teasing" was released a single and was accompanied by a music video that received airplay on MuchMusic. The band supported the album with a Canadian tour.

== Critical reception ==
Professional ratings
Review scores
Source	Rating
Edmonton Journal	3.5/5 stars
Winnipeg Sun	3.5/5 stars

The Hamilton Spectator wrote that "hHead are now mining Goo Goo Dolls and Foo Fighters post-grunge territory, although the track 'Bellybutton' shows significant growth around a swirling bass line and jumping-bean rhythms." The Edmonton Journal called Ozzy "a wildly varied album, shifting from muscular Sugar-y soundscapes to mid-tempo rockers with plenty of tempo and key changes." The Winnipeg Sun labeled the album "12 mini-gems ... which are familiar and fun all at the same time."

== Track listing ==
1. "Got" - 3:47
2. "Cage" - 3:30
3. "Apartment" - 3:31
4. "Teasing" - 4:04
5. "Ozzy" - 2:43
6. "Waiting" - 4:46
7. "Bellybutton" - 4:47
8. "Learn" - 3:02
9. "Want" - 2:42
10. "Flipped" - 3:12
11. "Kids" - 3:41
12. "Cockeyed" - 4:33
