= In Our Time (EP) =

EP by Cuff the Duke
- Released: April 12, 2012
- Genre: Alternative country, folk rock
- Label: Paper Bag Records

Cuff the Duke chronology
Morning Comes (2011)	In Our Time (2012)	Union (2012)

In Our Time is a two-part EP series by Canadian alternative country band Cuff the Duke, released in 2012 and 2013 on Paper Bag Records.

The EPs contain covers of songs by artists the band considers as influences on their sound and style, with six songs on each volume.

== Track listing ==
=== Part I ===
1. "Cold Blooded Old Times" (Smog)
2. "Smothered in Hugs" (Guided by Voices)
3. "Always Looking" (Dum Dum Girls)
4. "I Hear You Calling" (Bill Fay)
5. "Instant Karma!" (John Lennon)
6. "Diamond Sea" (Sonic Youth)

=== Part II ===
1. "You Sing Low and We Will Sing High" (Frederick Squire)
2. "I've Gotta Get a Message to You" (The Bee Gees)
3. "Star" (David Bowie)
4. "What Do I Get?" (Buzzcocks)
5. "Nashville West" (The Byrds)
6. "Face in the Mirror" (Gene MacLellan)
