= Lou Canon =

- Born: Leanne Greyerbiehl
- Origin: Canada
- Genres: pop, electronic
- Occupations: Musician, singer-songwriter
- Years active: 2011–present
- Label: Paper Bag Records

Lou Canon is the stage name of Leanne Greyerbiehl, a Canadian indie pop singer-songwriter.

The sister-in-law of Hayden, Canon worked as an elementary school teacher, pursuing music on the side as a hobby, until one year Hayden gave her some time in his home recording studio as a Christmas gift. The sessions resulted in her debut album, which was released in 2011 on Hayden's Hardwood Records.

Canon also appears as a guest vocalist on Hayden's 2013 album Us Alone, and toured with him on several concert dates to support the album.

She has since signed with Paper Bag Records with the release of her second album, Suspicious.

Her third album, Audomatic Body, was released in 2020. In January 2022 she released Reimagine the Body, a six-track EP of songs from Audomatic Body remixed by Époque Selector, Graham Walsh, July Talk, Lido Pimienta, Witch Prophet and Zoon.

== Discography ==
- Lou Canon (Hardwood - 2011)
- Suspicious (Paper Bag - 2017)
- Audomatic Body (Paper Bag - 2020)
- Reimagine the Body (2022)
