= L'Île de Sept Villes =

L'Île de Sept Villes is the third album by the Toronto-based instrumental band Hylozoists. It is nominated for a Juno Award in 2010 for Instrumental Album of the Year.

== Track listing ==
1. "The Possibility of an Island"
2. "Bras d'Or Lakes"
3. "The Island Of Seven Cities (FSR)"
4. "Bubbles&Wheezy"
5. "Dark Scene Waltz"
6. "Your Band Doesn't Have The Legs I Thought It Would"
7. "Parents Don't Let Your Children Grow up to Be Compressed"
8. "The French Settle In"
9. "Acadia Acadia"
10. "Soixante-Sept"
