= Everything in 3 Parts =

Studio album by The Golden Dogs
- Released: 2004
- Recorded: 2002–2003 by Michael W. Chambers @ various rehearsal spaces & apartments, and by Rudy Rempel, 2004 at Chemical Sound, Toronto
- Genre: Rock; Pop rock
- Length: 45:17
- Label: True North Records
- Producer: Dave Azzolini; Michael W. Chambers; Jessica Grassia

The Golden Dogs chronology
The Golden Dogs EP (2002)	Everything in 3 Parts (2004)	Big Eye Little Eye (2006)

Professional ratings
Review scores
Source	Rating
Allmusic	link

Everything in 3 Parts is the first full-length album by Canadian pop-rock band The Golden Dogs. This breakthrough album features their up-beat, debut single "Can't Get Your Face Out Of My Head" and the energy-charged, follow-up single "Yeah!" Also the song "Birdsong" was featured on a Zellers commercial in 2006. The song "Yeah" was also used in a Budweiser commercial in 2008.

== Track listing ==
All songs written and arranged by Dave Azzolini.

1. "Birdsong"
2. "Faster"
3. "Can't Get Your Face Out Of My Head"
4. "Don't Make A Sound"
5. "I Don't Sleep"
6. "Elevator Man"
7. "Bastards"
8. "Yeah!"
9. "Anniversary Waltz"
10. "Balloons"
11. "Driving In The Rain"
12. "Big Boy And The Masters Of The Universe"

== Personnel ==
- Dave Azzolini - Vocals, guitar, bass, drums
- Jessica Grassia - Backing vocals, keyboards, percussion
- Michael W. Chambers - Guitar, backing vocals, keyboards, bass
- Adam Warner - Drums
- Alfons Fear - Trumpet
- Micah Goldstein - Bass, backing vocals
- Beau Stocker - Drums
