= Hey Love (album) =

Studio album by Hayden
- Released: March 24, 2015
- Recorded: Skyscraper National Park, Revolution Recording
- Genres: Acoustic rock, indie folk, alternative country, folk rock
- Length: 44:46
- Label: Arts & Crafts
- Producer: Hayden

Hayden chronology
Us Alone (2013)	Hey Love (2015)

Professional ratings
Review scores
Source	Rating
AllMusic	link
Confront Magazine	link
Exclaim!	link

Hey Love is the eighth studio album by Canadian singer-songwriter Hayden, released March 24, 2015 on Arts & Crafts. The first single "Nowhere We Cannot Go" was released on January 28, 2015.

== Track listing ==
No.	Title	Length
1.	"Hearts Just Beat"	4:35
2.	"Troubled Times"	4:39
3.	"No Happy Birthday"	3:32
4.	"Nothing Easy Feels Good"	2:01
5.	"Time Ain't Slowing Down For Us"	4:22
6.	"Orange Curtain Light"	3:14
7.	"Come Back to Life"	2:16
8.	"Nowhere We Cannot Go"	3:52
9.	"Hey Love"	3:30
10.	"If More Things Go Wrong"	2:45
11.	"Five Seasons"	2:46
12.	"Just Come Out Tonight"	1:41
13.	"Shelter"	5:40
