= Big Eye Little Eye =

Studio album by The Golden Dogs
- Released: August 15, 2006
- Recorded: 2005–2006 by Paul Aucoin @ Halla Studio, Toronto
- Genres: Rock; Pop rock
- Length: 41:41
- Labels: True North Records; Universal Music Group
- Producers: Dave Azzolini; Jessica Grassia; Paul Aucoin

The Golden Dogs chronology
Everything in 3 Parts (2004)	Big Eye Little Eye (2006)

Professional ratings
Review scores
Source	Rating
Allmusic	link

Big Eye Little Eye is the second studio album by the Canadian rock group The Golden Dogs. The album features its first single "Never Meant Any Harm" and follow-up single "Construction Worker". Music videos were released for both songs. It also includes a cover of Wings's song "Nineteen Hundred and Eighty-Five" from their 1973 album Band on the Run.

== Track listing ==
All songs written and arranged by Dave Azzolini, except for "Nineteen Hundred and Eighty-Five", which is by Paul McCartney. This album was engineered, mixed and co-produced by Paul Aucoin (The Hylozoists, Cuff the Duke, The Fembots) at Halla Music Studios in Toronto.

1. "Dynamo"
2. "Never Meant Any Harm"
3. "Construction Worker"
4. "Saints At The Gates"
5. "Runouttaluck"
6. "Painting Ape"
7. "Strong"
8. "Theresa"
9. "Nineteen Hundred and Eighty-Five" (Wings cover)
10. "Life On The Line"
11. "Force Of Nature"
12. "Wheel Of Fortune"

== Personnel ==
- Dave Azzolini - Lead vocals, guitar
- Jessica Grassia - Backing vocals, keyboards, percussion
- Taylor Knox - Drums
- Neil Quinn - Backing vocals, guitar
