= Ruth Minnikin =

Canadian singer-songwriter

- Origin: Halifax, Nova Scotia, Canada
- Genres: Folk rock
- Occupation: Singer-songwriter
- Instrument(s): Vocals, guitar, bass, keyboard instruments
- Years active: 1996–present
- Labels: Song Mill
- Website: www.ruthminnikin.ca

Ruth Minnikin is a Canadian singer-songwriter. She was formerly a member of Booming Airplanes, The Heavy Blinkers, The Guthries, and Reels, and now performs as Ruth Minnikin and her Bandwagon.

She received nominations for Best Female Album and Best Folk Album at the 2007 Nova Scotia Music Awards.

Minnikin has performed at the East Coast Music Awards, South by Southwest, and North by Northeast.

Minnikin has collaborated frequently with other artists, and has contributed to 45 recordings. The artists that Minnikin has performed with include Beth Orton, David Byrne, Kris Kristofferson, Blue Rodeo, Calexico, Joel Plaskett, Buck 65, The Super Friendz, The Handsome Family, Wax Mannequin, and Mike O'Neill. In 2005, she collaborated with Ryan Bishops, Nathan Lawr, Kate Maki and Dale Murray in two national concert tours, A Midautumn Night's Dream and A Midwinter Night's Dream, which were reportedly inspired by Bob Dylan's Rolling Thunder Revue. The five musicians also recorded limited edition albums for sale on each tour.

Ruth maintains her writing and performance schedule throughout Korea. Highlights include two showcases at Zandari Festa in Seoul, The International Busan Jazz Festival, Gangjin Summer Rock Festival, and countless festivals on Jeju. However, her lifestyle now includes time for other passions like visual art, scuba diving and underwater photography.

In 2017, Minnikin was awarded a grant through Artscenic to produce an outdoor, audio/visual collaboration with another Jeju artist, Sinji Jung.

== Discography ==
=== Booming Airplanes ===
- 1996: Yarn

=== The Heavy Blinkers ===
- 1998: Hooray for Everything
- 2000: The Heavy Blinkers
- 2001: Better Weather
- 2003: Papa Nez: A Loose Salute to the Work of Michael Nesmith (contributed one song)
- 2003: Intercontinental Pop Exchange, Vol. 3 (split EP with Orwell)
- 2004: The Night And I Are Still So Young

=== The Guthries ===
- 2000: Off Windmill
- 2002: The Guthries

=== Reels ===
- 2004: Reels (guest singer)
- 2007: Autumn Country (bass, singer, keys, percussion)

=== Ruth Minnikin ===
- 2003: Live EP
- 2004: Marooned and Blue
- 2006: Folk Art

=== Ruth Minnikin and her Bandwagon ===
- 2007: Wanna Be Your Friend – A Tribute to the Inbreds (contributed song)
- 2008: Songs for the Gang: Thrush Hermit Tribute (contributed song)
- 2008: R n' B (EP)
- 2009: Depend on This
- 2012: The Minnikins' Photo Album

=== Contributions ===
- 2001: Joel Plaskett – Down at the Khyber (guest singer)
- 2001: Hopeful Monster – Hopeful Monster (guest singer)
- 2002: The Havenots – EP (guest singer, accordion, mandolin)
- 2002: Paul Bellini – We Love Disco (guest singer)
- 2004: Gabriel Minnikin – Hard Feelings (guest singer, accordion, mandolin)
- 2004: Jason Haywood – Nothing Stays the Same (guest singer, accordion)
- 2004: The Hurtin' Unit (accordion)
- 2005: The Hylozoists (guest singer)
- 2005: Dale Murray – Brighter Lives, Darker Side (guest singer, songwriter)
- 2005: Kate Maki – The Sun Will Find Us (guest singer, accordion)
- 2005: Soundtrack to film – The Life and Hard Times of Guy Terrifico (singer)
- 2005: KTB – Bluebird (guest singer)
- 2005: James Lyons Compilation (guest singer, songwriter)
- 2005: Jonathan Andrews – Halifax Indie Rock (guest singer)
- 2005: Norma Macdonald (guest singer, accordion)
- 2005: Old Man Luedecke – Hinderland (guest singer)
- 2006: The Divorcees (guest singer)
- 2006: The Hylozoists (guest singer)
- 2006: Johnny Stevens (guest singer, accordion)
- 2007: Orwell (guest singer)
- 2007: Gabriel Minnikin (guest singer, keys)
- 2007: Adam Puddington (organ, accordion, singer)
- 2008: The Russian Futurists (guest singer)
- 2008: Thrush Hermit Tribute (contributed song)
- 2008: Blue Skies Daisy Days – Planting Seed Records (contributed song)
- 2009: Kelly Sloan (accordion)
- 2009: Rich Aucoin (guest singer)
- 2009: Eric's Trip Tribute (contributed song)
- 2009: Savoury (accordion, singer)
- 2009: Jason Haywood (accordion, singer)
- 2009: Atlantic Voices – Rhino (contributed song)
- 2009: The Guthries – Sloan Tribute (contributed song)
- 2009: Zunior Christmas Album (contributed song)
- 2010: Andrew Watt and the Glory Glory (guest singer)
- 2010: Craig Buckley & Ruth Minnikin – Elevator Tribute (contributed song)
- 2010: (UK) BBC Manchester Recording – The Minnikins (contributed song)
- 2011: Molly Thomason – Beauty Queen (accordion, singer)
- 2011: Norma MacDonald (guest singer)
- 2011: The Deadly Hearts (organ, percussion, singer)
- 2011: A Reason for Hope – Benefit CD (contributed song)
- 2011: Mountains and the Trees (guest singer)
- 2012: Klarka Weinwurm – Continental Drag (guest singer)
- 2012: (Spain) Pecan Pie Compilation – Tribute to Eek (contributed song)
- 2012: Wood Bros. Band (guest singer)
- 2013: (UK) Gabriel Minnikin – Parakeets with Parasols (guest singer)
- 2013: Nathan Lawr – Chance Encounter (guest singer)
- 2013: (Spain) Toni Monserrat Inc. (guest singer)
- 2013: CBC Radio – Our Town (recording for radio)
- 2014: Dark Lit Sky (guest singer)
- 2014: ECMA Roots Compilation (contributed song)
- 2015: Mike O’Neill Tribute (contributed song)
- 2016: MINOTAURS (guest singer)
