= HHead =

Canadian alternative rock band

hHead
- Origin: Toronto, Ontario, Canada
- Genres: Alternative rock
- Years active: 1991–1997
- Labels: I.R.S. Handsome Boy Records
- Past members: Noah Mintz; Brendan Canning; Jason Ray; Mark Bartkiw; Roland Rainer; Zak Hanna

hHead was a Canadian alternative rock band, formed in 1991 in Toronto, Ontario.

== History ==
=== Origin story (1991–1992) ===
The band was originally formed by Noah Mintz and Brendan Canning after the duo met as students at Brock University.

They were originally as an acoustic duo and played under the name The Happy. They eventually evolved into a harder rock band, echoing the grunge sounds of the early 1990s.

Mintz and Canning called their new band Head but soon added a second h after discovering that another band was already recording as Head, although both hHead and the Vancouver band Rymes with Orange regularly joked in promotional interviews that the extra h had been traded between the bands by either donation or theft.

The band employed a series of drummers during their career. This includes Mark Bartkiw, who previously played in Fancypants Hoodlum (a project led by Merrill Nisker, who would later go on to perform as electroclash superstar Peaches).

=== Career highlights (1993–1997) ===
The band's first album, Fireman, was released independently in 1992. It became popular on Canadian campus radio, receiving wider distribution in 1993.

hHead became a popular live act in Toronto, playing at such clubs as the Drake Hotel, Lee's Palace, and The Rivoli. At the latter, one performance saw a young Stone Temple Pilots open for hHead. This was STP's first Toronto appearance.

hHead also toured Canada and the United States as both as a headliner in rock clubs and as an opening act for a wide range of artists. hHead opened shows for international acts like My Bloody Valentine, Dinosaur Jr., Letters to Cleo, Goo Goo Dolls, The Lemonheads, and Stone Temple Pilots. hHead also played Canadian tours with The Tragically Hip, The Watchmen, Sloan, and Eric's Trip.

In 1993, the band won CFNY-FM's Discovery to Disc contest, which awarded them $100,000 toward the recording of a new album.

The band landed a contract with IRS Records in 1994, releasing their second album, Jerk, that year. The album was supported by a large-scale national tour as an opening act for Moist, and by an appearance on the Edgefest bill in 1995. However, IRS Records was at this point in financial trouble, and declared bankruptcy in 1996.

The band then moved to the Canadian independent label Handsome Boy Records for their final album, Ozzy in 1996.

hHead played their final show at Edenfest in 1996 and the band broke up in 1997.

=== Post breakup (1997–present) ===
Mintz is now a mastering engineer for artists such as Hayden, Broken Social Scene and The Dears, and has recorded solo material as Noah's Arkweld. Leslie Feist was part of an early version of Noah's Arkweld.

In 2015, the previously unreleased track "Fempire" and a solo track by Canning titled "Born from the Ashes" appeared on Squirtgun Records' 20th anniversary Return of Our Stupid Noise compilation.

Canning joined By Divine Right for that band's third album Bless This Mess, and later formed the bands Broken Social Scene with Kevin Drew and Cookie Duster with Bernard Maiezza. Broken Social Scene's album Bee Hives includes a song titled "hHallmark", alluding to the unique typography of hHead's name.

== Members ==
- Noah Mintz - Guitar / Vocals (1991–1997)
- Brendan Canning - Bass guitar / Backing vocals (1991–1997)
- Jason Ray - Drums (1996–1997)
- Mark Bartkiw - Drums (1992–1995)
- Roland Rainer - Drums (1991–1992)
- Zak Hanna - Additional Guitar (on Fireman) (1991–1992)

== Discography ==
- 1991 — Potato E.P. (Self-Release)
- 1992 — Fireman (re-released 1993)
- 1994 — Jerk
- 1996 — Ozzy
- 2017 — Rare and Odd (1991-1997) (Digital Release)

== Compilations ==
The band provided the non-album track "Want" to the 1996 and 1998 editions of More of Our Stupid Noise.

They also appeared on number of tribute albums during their career. They covered Neil Young's "Look Out for my Love" on the 1994 album Borrowed Tunes: A Tribute to Neil Young. hHead also provided a cover of Bob Snider's "They Oughta Bottle Friday Night" for the 1996 tribute album Poetreason: The Songs of Bob Snider
