= Carry On Mentality =

Single by Hayden
- B-side: "Wasting My Days Away"
- Released: 1997
- Genre: Acoustic rock Alt country Folk rock
- Length: 3:43
- Label: Landspeed
- Songwriter(s): Paul Hayden Desser

Hayden singles chronology
"'Lunar Landing Confirmed'" (1996)	"Carry On Mentality" (1997)	"Better Off Inside" (1998)

"Carry On Mentality" is a 7" vinyl single by Canadian singer-songwriter Hayden. It was released in 1997 on Landspeed Records.

== Track listing ==
All songs written by Paul Hayden Desser.

Side A:

- "Carry On Mentality" – 3:43

Side B:

- "Wasting My Days Away" – 4:50
