= Rick Brant =

Central character of a juvenile novel series

- Volume 1
- Author: John Blaine, pseudonym Harold L. Goodwin; Peter J. Harkins
- Country: United States
- Language: English
- Genre: Adventure; Science
- Publisher: Grosset & Dunlap
- Published: 1947-1990 (#1-24)
- Media type: Print

Rick Brant is a series of science-themed adventure and mystery novels following the eponymous character. There are 24 books, all credited to John Blaine, a pseudonym for Harold L. Goodwin and, for the first three books, co-author Peter J. Harkins. The series was published by Grosset & Dunlap between 1947 and 1968, with the previously unpublished title The Magic Talisman printed in 1990 in a limited edition as the concluding #24.

== Description ==
The Rick Brant series has a scientific tone and was taglined as "Electronic Adventures", "Science-Adventure Stories", and finally "SCIENCE Adventures". The science in the stories is realistic for the era, unlike the more fantastic science of the Tom Swift, Jr. series.

In the series, Rick lives on Spindrift Island off the coast of New Jersey, where his father heads the Spindrift Foundation, a group of scientists. Rick is involved in various adventures at home and abroad. The Spindrift Foundation sends scientific expeditions to various foreign locations, with Rick sent along as an assistant. United States locales include New Jersey, Nevada, Virginia, and Washington D.C. Foreign locales include the Virgin Islands, Tibet, Hong Kong, the Philippines, Tahiti, India, Nepal, Egypt, Nigeria, and Europe.

Hal Goodwin was a popular science writer with a strong technical background and a sense of style unusual in the juvenile adventure-series field. The books are suspenseful, well-plotted, atmospheric, and enriched by humor and acute characterization as well as personal experience. Exotic locales such as tropical islands, the Philippine jungles, and the Himalayas are given vivid and well-researched depictions, as are a variety of specialized hobbies and professions, such as scuba diving, infrared photography, home rocketry, and the inevitable espionage work. Like the Ken Holt mystery series, the tales appeal to a slightly older audience than do comparable Grosset & Dunlap series. Ken Holt had a crossover cameo in The Flying Stingaree, and Rick lent some of his gadgets to Ken in The Mystery of the Plumed Serpent, by agreement of the two authors.

Rick is also a private pilot who owns his own airplanes and uses them in a number of the books. His first plane was a Piper Cub, presumably a Piper J-4, and his second was a "Sky Wagon", presumably a Cessna 180 Skywagon.

== Characters ==
Rick Brant is the teenaged hero of the stories. He is the son of Hartson Brant the leader of the Spindrift Foundation. Donald "Scotty" Scott, his ex-Marine pal, and sidekick in most of the events.

=== Secondary characters ===
- Barbara "Barby" Brant, Rick's younger sister
- Chahda, a resourceful youth from India, who learned everything he knows, including how to speak English, from reading an old edition of the World Almanac
- Janice Miller (Jan), daughter of Dr. Walter Miller, a Spindrift scientist; Barbara's friend.
- Dismal, the Brant family dog
- Steve Ames, an agent of "JANIG", the fictional Joint Army-Navy Intelligence Group
- Mrs. Brant, Rick's mother; her given name is never mentioned.

Various Spindrift scientists also appear through the series:

- Hartson Brant, world famous scientist and Rick's father
- Hobart Zircon, a physicist
- Julius Weiss, a mathematician
- Parnell Winston, a cyberneticist
- Tony Briotti, an archaeologist
- John Gordon, a rocket designer

== Publishing status ==
The publishers were averse to any suggestion of the supernatural in the series. An ambiguous end to The Blue Ghost Mystery was dropped, and an entire book (The Magic Talisman) was rejected due to its inclusion of ESP elements. This lost tale was eventually published in an independent edition in 1990.

Beginning in the 1980s, Grosset & Dunlap began transferring the copyrights to Hal Goodwin. The rights are now held by the John Blaine/Rick Brant Trust. The Goodwin family has been working to bring the works back in print, starting with the rarer final four books.

Rick Brant never graduated to any other medium of entertainment, although there are notable similarities to be found in the Jonny Quest franchise.

On November 9, 2010 an e-book, The Rick Brant Science-Adventure Series, was released on Amazon for the Kindle eReader containing eleven of the original novels.

== Books ==
1. The Rocket's Shadow (1947) Rick meets Scotty and investigates sabotage of Spindrift's experimental rocket.
2. The Lost City (1947) Rick and Scotty journey to the Himalayas to set up a relay station to bounce a radar signal off the moon. (Chahda character introduced.)
3. Sea Gold (1947) Rick and Scotty get jobs at a new plant to extract minerals from sea water, and investigate possible sabotage.
4. 100 Fathoms Under (1947) Rick and Scotty travel to the South Pacific in search of an ancient archaeological artifact.
5. The Whispering Box Mystery (1948) Rick and Scotty race against time to stop a ring of spies from using a paralyzing weapon to steal government secrets. (JANIG and Steve Ames character introduced.)
6. The Phantom Shark (1949) Rick and Scotty cross paths with a nefarious pearl thief in the South Pacific.
7. Smugglers' Reef (1950) Rick and Scotty use an infrared camera to gather evidence against smugglers.
8. The Caves of Fear (1951) Rick and Scotty travel to the Himalayas again, this time to stop nuclear materials from falling into the wrong hands.
9. Stairway to Danger (1952) Rick and Scotty battle a hardened and desperate criminal in an abandoned amusement park.
10. The Golden Skull (1954) Rick and Scotty search for a sacred relic in the Philippines.
11. The Wailing Octopus (1956) On a skin-diving vacation in the Virgin Islands, Rick and Scotty stumble across deadly spies.
12. The Electronic Mind Reader (1957) Rick and Scotty are shocked as one scientist after another falls victim to a diabolical machine. (Janice Miller character introduced.)
13. The Scarlet Lake Mystery (1958) Rick and Scotty visit a rocket base in Nevada, and encounter sabotage and a life or death situation for Rick.
14. The Pirates of Shan (1958) Rick and Scotty search for Spindrift scientists kidnapped by pirates in the Philippines.
15. The Blue Ghost Mystery (1960) Rick and Scotty's Virginia vacation turns into an encounter with what seems to be a Civil War ghost.
16. The Egyptian Cat Mystery (1961) Rick and Scotty travel to Egypt and discover that an apparently unassuming cat figurine holds a secret.
17. The Flaming Mountain (1962) Rick and Scotty aid the Spindrift Foundation's mission to save an island from an active volcano.
18. The Flying Stingaree (1963) Intrigued by mysterious UFO sightings, Rick and Scotty battle against a group of crafty spies.
19. The Ruby Ray Mystery (1964) Rick and Scotty walk the line between East and West only to have their allegiance questioned and their lives placed in jeopardy.
20. The Veiled Raiders (1965) Rick and Scotty go to Nigeria to test laser/satellite communication, and are taken prisoner in the Sahara by hostile natives.
21. Rocket Jumper (1966) Rick and Scotty use a rocket pack to save their loved ones from a fearsome plot.
22. The Deadly Dutchman (1967) Rick and Scotty's tour of Europe is interrupted by a fiendish gem trader.
23. Danger Below! (1968) Rick and Scotty probe the cause of the sinking of an oil rig off Spindrift.
24. The Magic Talisman (1990) Rick and Scotty investigate mysterious goings-on in a house used for a dinner theater magic show. Unpublished by Grosset & Dunlap, this title was published by Manuscript Press in a limited edition of 500 copies.
- Rick Brant's Science Projects (1960) Rick and Scotty explain the secrets behind many of the inventions, codes, and logic used in their adventures.

=== Titles included in eBook ===
- #7 – Smugglers' Reef
- #8 – The Caves of Fear
- #10 – The Golden Skull
- #11 – The Wailing Octopus
- #12 – The Electronic Mind Reader
- #13 – The Scarlet Lake Mystery
- #14 – The Pirates of Shan
- #15 – The Blue Ghost Mystery
- #16 – The Egyptian Cat Mystery
- #17 – The Flaming Mountain
- #18 – The Flying Stingaree

These titles are also available from Project Gutenberg.
