= Cuff the Duke =

Alt-country band

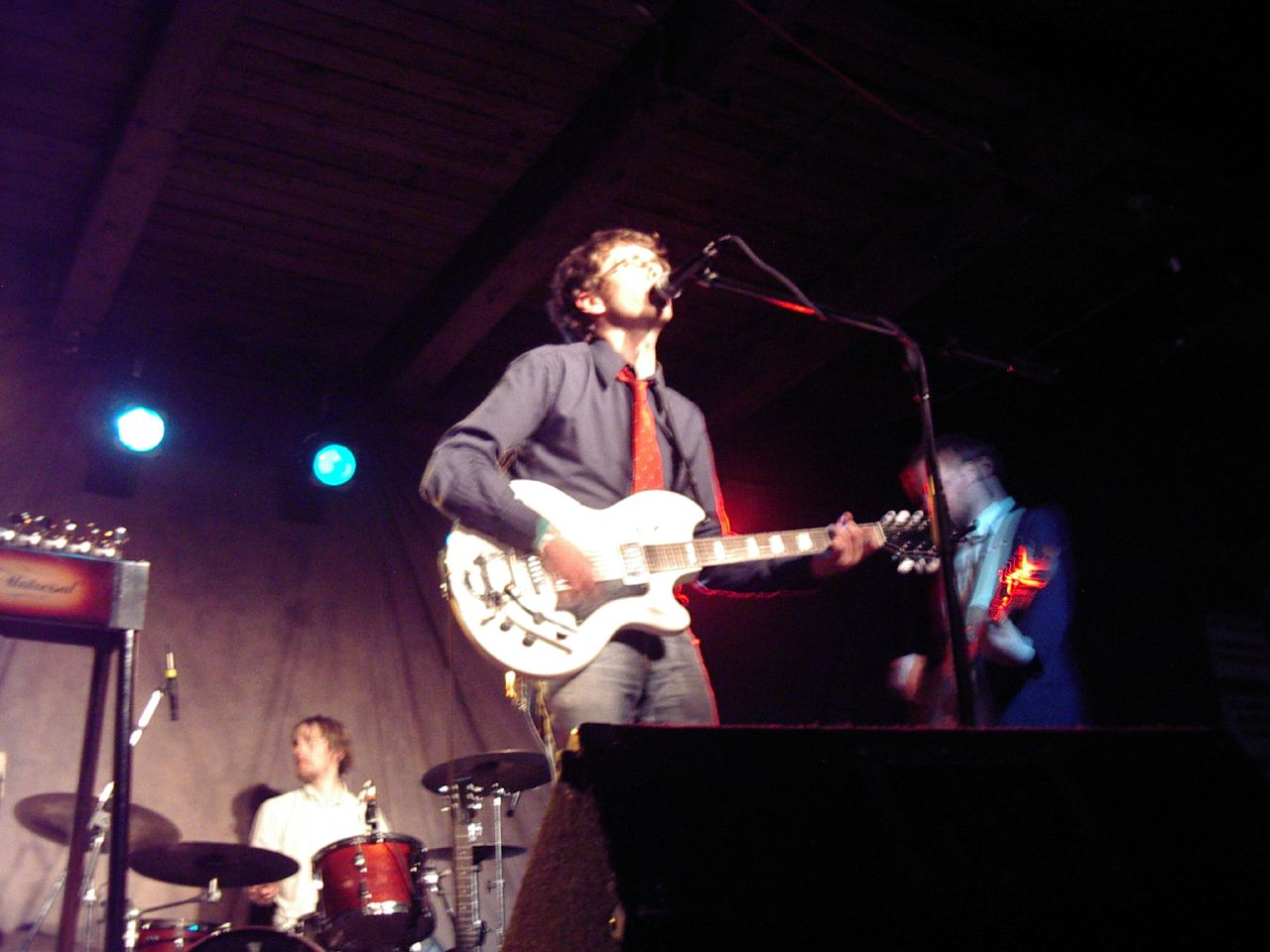
- Cuff the Duke performing at The Exchange in Regina, Saskatchewan in 2006

Background information
- Origin: Oshawa, Ontario, Canada
- Genre: Alternative country
- Years active: 2001–present
- Labels: Paper Bag, Three Gut, Hardwood, Noble
- Members: Wayne Petti; Paul Lowman; AJ Johnson; François Turenne; Thom Hammerton
- Past members: Dale Murray; Corey Wood; Jordan Howard; Jeff Peers; Brad Fudge; Patrick Conan; Steve Krecklo; Christopher Sandes; Matt Faris
- Website: www.cufftheduke.ca

Cuff the Duke is a Canadian alt-country band from Oshawa, Ontario. They play a blend of traditional country and folk music with indie rock influences.

== History ==
Cuff the Duke formed in Oshawa, drawing their name from a shirt purchased by front-man Wayne Petti at a secondhand shop. Starting as a duo consisting of Petti and Jeff Peers, the band later expanded to include bass player Paul Lowman and drummer Brad Fudge. In 2002, they released their first album, Life Stories for Minimum Wage on Three Gut Records. They spent the next few years touring with Hayden, acting as his backing band. In 2005, they released their second album, Cuff the Duke on Hardwood Records.

The line-up for Cuff the Duke has evolved, with the consistent members thus far being Wayne Petti and Paul Lowman. With Dale Murray now in Cuff the Duke, the band has taken on a more polished tone, due to his pedal steel and guitar playing. Patrick Conan (who temporarily filled in for Matt Faris who has been side-lined from playing live due to wrist surgery) has been a steady drummer and has filled Matt Faris' shoes well. Paul Aucoin of the Hylozoists also occasionally performs live with Cuff the Duke playing vibraphone, glockenspiel, and percussion. Paul also produced Cuff the Duke's self-titled album in 2005. Since June 2007, Corey Wood has taken on the role of Cuff the Duke's drummer and is now an official member of the band.

Cuff the Duke utilizes a wide range of instruments, of these the more notable instruments are bells, Moog synthesizers, wind organs, Hammond organs, and lap steel.

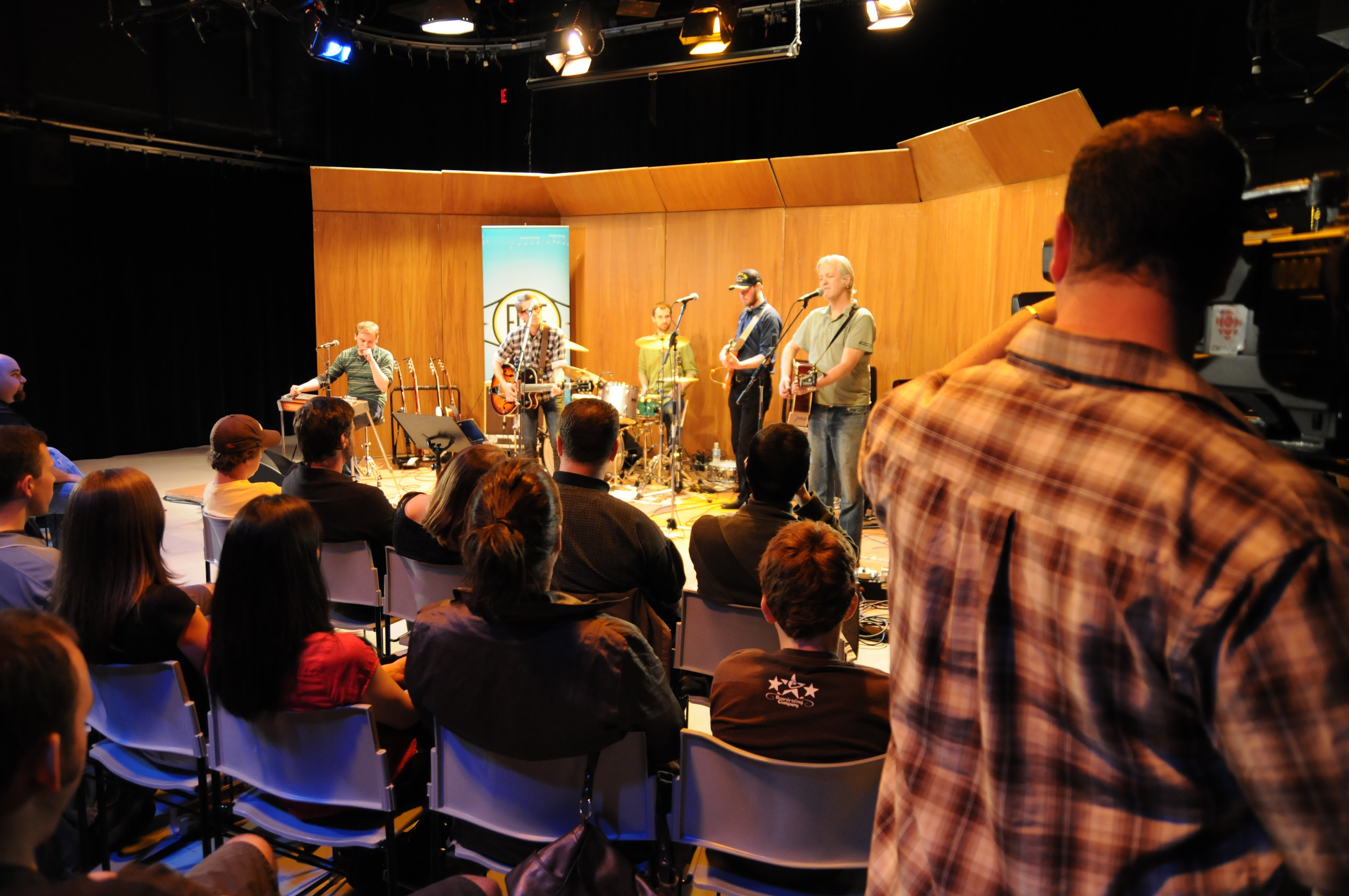
Cuff the Duke performing at CBC's Studio 40, April 22, 2008

On March 16, 2007, a Cuff the Duke recording was released on The Secret Sessions, a tribute album to the Rheostatics. The band recorded a version of "Claire", which was originally released on the Rheostatics' Introducing Happiness. The Secret Sessions is available from Canadian digital indie label Zunior.

On October 23, 2007, Cuff the Duke's album Sidelines of the City was released.

Following the tour to support their 2012 album Union, the band effectively took a hiatus for several years. They returned in 2018 with a vinyl reissue of their debut album, supported by select concert dates, and announced in early 2019 that they had begun work on a new album.

Petti and Murray have also released solo albums.

On April 22, 2008, Cuff the Duke performed with Greg Keelor of Blue Rodeo at a taping of the CBC Radio show Fuse at CBC's Studio 40 in Ottawa. On September 8, 2009, they released the album Way Down Here, which was produced by Keelor.

== Band members ==
=== Current ===
- Wayne Petti – vocals, guitars, keyboards, harmonica, bass (2001–present)
- Paul Lowman – bass, fiddle, keyboards, backing vocals, mandolin, guitars, lap steel (2001–present)
- François Turenne - guitars, keyboards, backing vocals (2009–present)
- AJ Johnson - drums, percussion, backing vocals (2011–present)
- Thom Hammerton - keyboards (2011–present)

=== Former ===
- Jeff Peers – guitar, keyboards, percussion (2001–2005)
- Brad Fudge – drums, percussion (2001–2003)
- Steve Krecklo – lead guitar, lap steel, keyboards, organ, percussion, backing vocals (2002, for Life Stories for Minimum Wage)
- Matt Faris – drums, percussion (2003–2006)
- Dale Murray – guitar, pedal steel, backing vocals (2005–2011)
- Patrick Conan – live drums, percussion (2006)
- Paul Aucoin – live keyboards, percussion (2005–2006)
- Christopher Sandes – live keyboards (2007–2008)
- Corey Wood – drums, percussion (2006-2010)
- Jordan Howard - lead guitar (live) (2012)

== Discography ==
=== Albums ===
- Life Stories for Minimum Wage (2002 on Three Gut Records, re-released 2007 on Outside Music)
- Cuff the Duke (2005 on Hardwood Records)
- Sidelines of the City (2007 on Hardwood Records)
- Way Down Here (September 8, 2009 on Noble Recording Co.)
- Morning Comes (October 4, 2011 on Paper Bag Records)
- Union (October 2, 2012 on Paper Bag Records)
- Breaking Dawn (September 6, 2024 on Cardinal Records)

=== EPs ===
- In Our Time (April 12, 2012 on Paper Bag Records)
- In Our Time, Part II (2013)

=== Non-album tracks ===
- "Deciding on Luther" (Life Stories for Minimum Wage outtake)
- "Words (between the lines of age)" (Borrowed Tunes II: A Tribute to Neil Young, 2007)
- "Claire" (The Secret Sessions, 2007)
- "North Window" (Have Not Been the Same, Vol. 1: Too Cool to Live, Too Smart to Die, 2011)
- "Star" (Paper Bag Records vs. The Rise and Fall of Ziggy Stardust and the Spiders from Mars, 2012)

== See also ==
- Music of Canada
- Canadian rock
- List of bands from Canada
- List of Canadian musicians
- Category:Canadian musical groups
