= On High =

Studio album by Kate Maki
- Released: February 12, 2008
- Genre: folk
- Label: Confusion Unlimited, OW OM
- Producer: Howe Gelb, Kate Maki

Kate Maki chronology
The Sun Will Find Us (2004)	On High (2008)	Two Song Wedding (2010)

Professional ratings
Review scores
Source	Rating
Pitchfork Media	(6.5/10)
Ottawa Citizen	4/5 stars

On High is the third album by Canadian singer-songwriter Kate Maki, released on February 12, 2008, in the USA on Howe Gelb's record label OW OM Records and in Canada on Maki's label Confusion Unlimited.

The album's lead single, "Blue Morning", was highlighted as a "Song of the Day" by NPR, KCRW, and WXPN.

The song "To Please" was featured in the film Ingenious from 2009, and the song "Highway" was featured in Episode 9 of the television series Hard Rock Medical in 2013.

== Track listing ==
1. "Highway"
2. "Blue Morning"
3. "Wanted Ads"
4. "White Noise"
5. "To Please"
6. "Message Forgot"
7. "Badminton Racquet"
8. "Beyond the Sun"
9. "We Are Gone"
10. "Don't Look Down"
11. "On a String"
