= Wind organ =

Musical instrument

The wind organ is a Wind instrument.

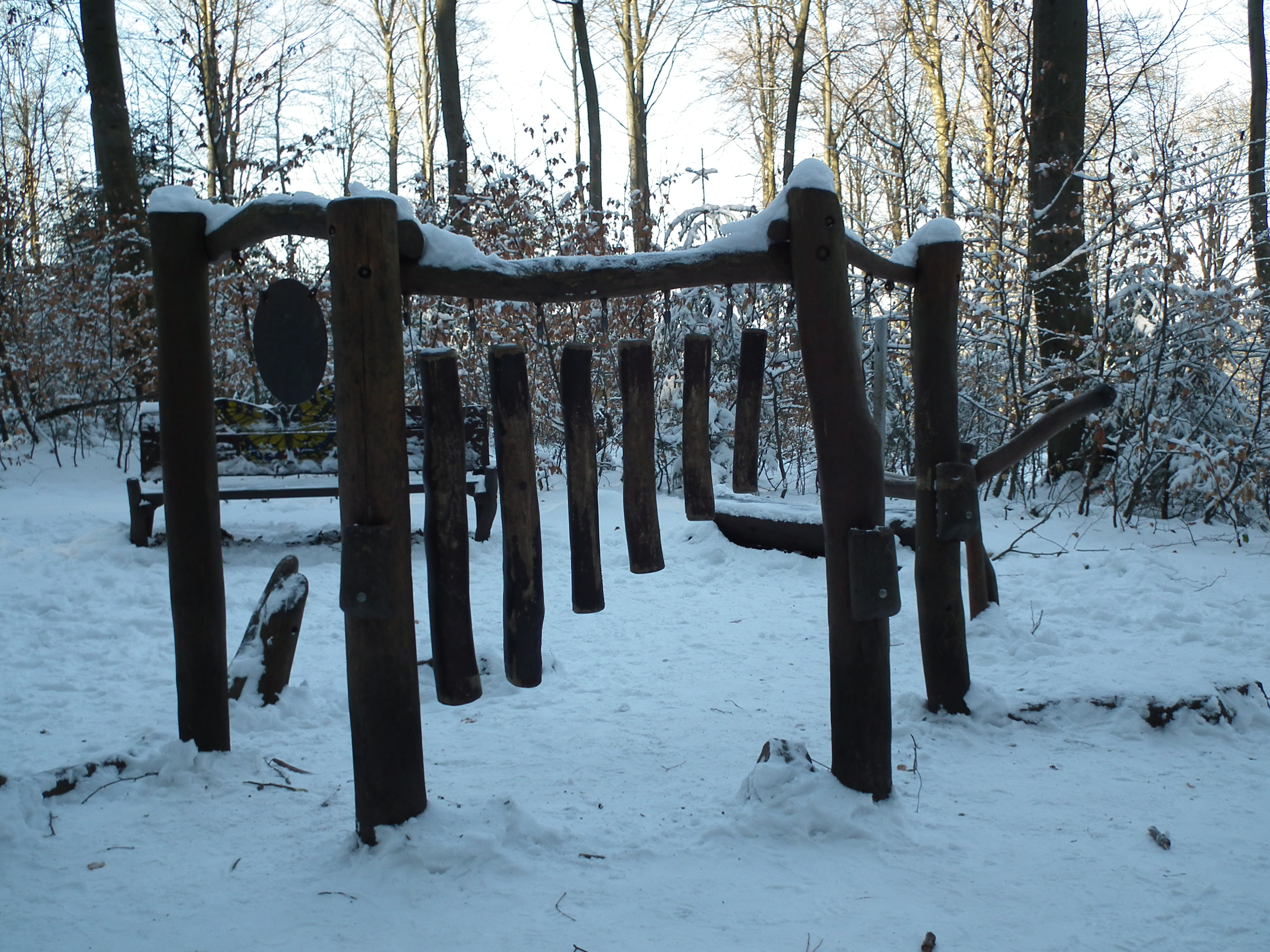
Wind organ (Sound game) on the forest educational trail in the Heidelberg König Stuhl (Baden-Württemberg, Germany)

A wind organ is a musical instrument designed to be played by the wind. Designs of wind organs vary depending on the artist constructing the organ. Some are made of hollow receptacles that sound as the wind blows across their mouths while others are constructed from taut metal wires that sing when the wind blows against them, similar to the way wire fences vibrate in the wind.
