= Hopeful Monster (band) =

Canadian chamber pop band

- Origin: Seabright, Nova Scotia, Canada
- Genres: Psychedelic chamber pop
- Years active: 2000–present
- Members: Jason Ball; José Miguel Contreras; Randy Lee; Alex McMaster
- Website: hopefulmonster.ca

Hopeful Monster is a Canadian chamber pop band, formed in 2000 by singer-songwriter Jason Ball for a recording project at his own Nervous System Studio in Seabright, Nova Scotia. Hopeful Monster was released in 2002 on Halifax label Brobdingnagian Records, featuring orchestral session players and members of local bands Heavy Blinkers, The Guthries, and Matt Mays & El Torpedo, as well as studio partner and Hylozoists composer Paul Aucoin.

Following a move to Toronto, Ball released a second album, Metatasking, under the Hopeful Monster moniker in 2008, featuring members of By Divine Right, Hylozoists, and side project The Wilderness.

In 2010, Hopeful Monster was selected to represent Nova Scotia on CBC Radio 2's Great Canadian Song Quest compilation, for which an artist from each Canadian province and territory contributed a song, written about a road chosen by listeners via CBC's online voting platform.

A third Hopeful Monster album, Beautiful Island, was released in 2013.
