= Morning Comes (album) =

Studio album by Cuff the Duke
- Released: October 4, 2011
- Genre: Alternative country, folk rock
- Label: Paper Bag Records
- Producer: Greg Keelor

Cuff the Duke chronology
Way Down Here (2009)	Morning Comes (2011)	In Our Time (2012)

Morning Comes is the fifth album by Canadian alternative country group Cuff the Duke, released October 4, 2011 on Paper Bag Records. The album was nominated for Adult Alternative Album of the Year at the 2012 Juno Awards.

It was the band's second album to be produced by Greg Keelor of Blue Rodeo.

== Track listing ==
1. "Time Is Right"
2. "You Don't Know What it's Like"
3. "Count on Me"
4. "Standing on the Edge"
5. "So Many Times Before"
6. "Bound to Your Own Vices"
7. "Brightest Part of the Sun"
8. "Drag Me Down"
9. "You Won't Look Back"
10. "Letting Go"
