= In Field & Town =

Studio album by Hayden
- Released: January 15, 2008
- Genre: Acoustic rock, alternative country, indie folk, folk rock
- Length: 36:11
- Label: Hardwood/Universal Music Canada (Canada)

Hayden chronology
Elk-Lake Serenade (2004)	In Field & Town (2008)	The Place Where We Lived (2009)

Professional ratings
Review scores
Source	Rating
AllMusic	4/5 stars
eye weekly	4/5 stars
Exclaim!	(favourable)
Pitchfork Media	5.1/10
Cokemachineglow	84%
Contactmusic.com	8/10 stars
QRO Magazine	(7.4/10)

In Field & Town is the fifth album by Canadian singer-songwriter Hayden, released January 15, 2008, on Hardwood Records and Universal Music Canada.

== Track listing ==
1. "In Field & Town" - 3:49
2. "More Than Alive" - 2:59
3. "The Van Song" - 2:45
4. "Worthy of Your Esteem" - 3:26
5. "Damn This Feeling" - 3:19
6. "Did I Wake Up Beside You?" - 5:02
7. "Weight of the World" - 1:41
8. "Where and When" - 3:15
9. "Lonely Security Guard" - 4:26
10. "The Hardest Part" - 2:21
11. "Barely Friends" - 3:08
12. "Disappear" [iTunes bonus track]
