= The Hylozoists =

Canadian instrumental rock supergroup

- Origin: Halifax, Nova Scotia, Canada
- Genres: Instrumental rock, indie rock
- Years active: 2001–2009
- Labels: Boompa, Zunior
- Members: Paul Aucoin, Randy Lee, Paul Lowman, Greg Millson, Christopher Sandes, François Turenne, Eric Woolston
- Past members: Bryden Baird, Jason Ball, Dave Christensen, Patrick Conan, Peter Conrad, Matthew Faris, Jonina Gibson, Rob Gordon, Monica Guenter, Taylor Knox, Nathan Lawr, Dave MacKinnon, Ruth Minnikin, Damian Monyhan, Dale Murray, Michael Olsen, Owen Pallett, Lukas Pearse, Julie Penner, Wayne Petti, Brian Poirier, Jeremy Strachan, Jason Tait, Leanne Zacharias

The Hylozoists are a Canadian instrumental rock supergroup formed in 2001 in Halifax, Nova Scotia. The band's name is derived from hylozoism, and it was founded as a side project by record producer and multi-instrumentalist Paul Aucoin.

== History ==
The Hylozoists is an instrumental band conceived by producer Paul Aucoin in 2001. Aucoin wrote and recorded their first album, La Nouvelle Gauche, using a line-up of musicians primarily from Halifax, in his studio in Nova Scotia. The Hylozoists was temporarily set aside when Aucoin returned to his work with the band The Sadies.

In 2004, Aucoin relocated to Toronto, where he revived The Hylozoists with a new line-up featuring musicians from other bands, including The Weakerthans, FemBots, and Cuff the Duke. In this new phase, Aucoin moved away from the concept of a solo project and developed the group into a collaborative supergroup.

The group's third album, L'île de Sept Villes, received a Juno Award nomination in 2010 for Instrumental Album of the Year.

In addition to his work with The Hylozoists, Aucoin has produced albums for other artists, including Cuff the Duke's Sidelines of the City, The Golden Dogs' Big Eye Little Eye, and John K. Samson's Provincial.

== Music ==
The Hylozoists' music has been described on their MySpace page as Indie/Classical/Emotronic, a characterization that reflects their distinctive instrumentation. Many of the instruments used by the group—such as vibraphone, glockenspiel, organ, violin, and viola—are traditionally associated with classical music, and occasionally with jazz. These are combined with more conventional rock instruments, including drums, pedal steel guitar, electric guitar, and bass.

The band's sound is defined less by its choice of instruments than by how those instruments are arranged and applied. While the inclusion of vibraphone and glockenspiel is unusual for an indie rock group, the music often evokes the atmosphere of a film score. Aucoin's formal musical training, which included classical study, informs his approach to composition and orchestration. For example, in the song "Warning Against Judging," the opening minute features glockenspiel, organ, and guitar, creating a texture reminiscent of orchestral film music. As the piece develops, the addition of drums, bass, violin, and trumpet maintains the cinematic quality through careful orchestration.

The band's musical development also reflects its geographic and creative evolution. The Hylozoists originated in Halifax, where they recorded their debut album, La Nouvelle Gauche. Following Aucoin's relocation to Toronto, the group recorded their second album, La Fin du Monde.

== Personnel ==
- Paul Aucoin (vibraphone, glockenspiel, drums) — founder, also from The Sadies, Cuff the Duke, Hopeful Monster
- Randy Lee (violin)
- Paul Lowman (bass) — from Cuff the Duke
- Greg Millson (drums) — from Gentleman Reg & Great Lake Swimmers
- Christopher Sandes (piano, organ) — from Cuff the Duke
- François Turenne (guitar)
- Eric Woolston (vibraphone, glockenspiel, drums)

=== Regular touring members ===
- Patrick Conan (vibraphone, glockenspiel, drums) — from Tricky Woo, Cuff the Duke
- Matthew Faris (drums) — from Cuff the Duke

=== Past (and part-time touring) members ===
- Rich Aucoin
- Bryden Baird (horns)
- Jason Ball (organ, vocals) — from Hopeful Monster
- Dave Christensen (woodwinds) — from the Heavy Blinkers, Hopeful Monster
- Peter Conrad (cello)
- Jonina Gibson (viola)
- Rob Gordon (drums)
- Monica Guenter (viola) — from Christine Fellows' band
- Taylor Knox (drums)
- Nathan Lawr (drums) — from Sea Snakes
- Dave MacKinnon (vocals) — from FemBots, Hummer
- Ruth Minnikin (vocals) — from the Heavy Blinkers, The Guthries
- Damian Monyhan (drums) — from Hopeful Monster
- Dale Murray (pedal steel, guitar) — from The Guthries, Hopeful Monster
- Michael Olsen (cello)
- Owen Pallett (violin) — aka "Final Fantasy"
- Lukas Pearse (double bass)
- Julie Penner (violin) — from Broken Social Scene, Do Make Say Think
- Wayne Petti (piano, vocals) — from Cuff the Duke
- Brian Poirier ("weird") — from FemBots, Hummer
- Jeremy Strachan (guitar) — from Rockets Red Glare, Sea Snakes, Hopeful Monster, Feuermusik
- Jason Tait (vibraphone, glockenspiel) — from The Weakerthans, FemBots, Broken Social Scene, Christine Fellows' band
- Leanne Zacharias (cello) — from Christine Fellows' band

== Discography ==
- La Nouvelle Gauche (2002)
- La Fin du Monde (2006)
- L'île de Sept Villes (2009)

== See also ==
- Music of Canada
- Canadian rock
- List of Canadian musicians
- List of bands from Canada
- Category:Canadian musical groups
