= Way Down Here =

Studio album by Cuff the Duke
- Released: September 8, 2009
- Recorded: January 2009
- Genre: Alternative country, folk rock
- Label: Noble Recording Co., Ernest Jenning Record Co. (US)
- Producer: Greg Keelor

Cuff the Duke chronology
Sidelines of the City (2007)	Way Down Here (2009)	Morning Comes (2011)

Professional ratings
Review scores
Source	Rating
CHARTattack	4/5 stars

Way Down Here is the fourth album by Canadian alternative country group Cuff the Duke, released September 8, 2009 on Noble Recordings in Canada and Ernest Jenning Record Co. in the US.

== Track listing ==
1. "You Were Right"
2. "Follow Me"
3. "It's All a Blur"
4. "The Words You Ignore"
5. "Promises"
6. "Listen to Your Heart"
7. "Rockin' Chair"
8. "Like the Morning"
9. "Another Day in Purgatory"
10. "Need You"
11. "Farley the Dog"
