= The Golden Dogs =

Canadian pop-rock band

- Origin: Toronto, Ontario, Canada
- Genres: Rock, indie rock
- Years active: 2001–present
- Labels: True North, Nevado Records, Dine Alone Records
- Members: Dave Azzolini; Jessica Grassia; Alejandro Cairncross; Stefanie McCarol
- Past members: Neil Quin; Micah Goldstein; Beau Stocker; Adam Warner; Ian Goodhue; Carlin Nicholson; Michael W. Chambers; Stewart Heyduk; Dave Dalrymple; Kelvin Mehandroo; Taylor Knox; Jay McCarrol; James Robertson
- Website: thegoldendogs.com

The Golden Dogs are a Canadian pop-rock band based in Toronto, Ontario, Canada. Formed in 2001, the band is known for their wild, energetic live shows and were labelled as one of the best live bands in Canada by Chart Magazine.

== History ==
Dave Azzolini is the songwriting force, supported by wife Jessica Grassia on drums (formerly on keys). Together they produce the band's live shows and recorded music. Their debut album Everything in 3 Parts, released on True North Records in 2004, began their rising popularity in the Toronto indie scene with the single "YEAH!" More popularity would come in 2006 when the band released their second album with True North Records, Big Eye Little Eye. The first two singles "Never Meant Any Harm" and "Construction Worker" were immortalized on video by French director Arno Salters. Big Eye Little Eye was released in the USA on August 16, 2007, on Yeproc Records.

In 2008, the band had a busy year in the US touring with the likes of, most notably, Feist, Sloan. Later in that year, the band parted ways with True North Records and spent most of 2009 writing and recording their third full-length album, Coat of Arms, which was recorded by Carlin Nicholson and Mike O'Brien, members of Zeus. Some members of The Golden Dogs appeared on much of Zeus' album Say Us. Coat of Arms was released on Nevado Records in Canada and Dine Alone Records in the US.

The band has shared the stage with several notable acts including Sloan, Feist, Joel Plaskett, The Meligrove Band, The Bicycles, The Kaiser Chiefs, Razorlight, Bloc Party, Blue Rodeo, Major Grange, Roky Erikson, Thurston Moore, Electric Six, The Willowz, Ida Maria, Malajube, Peter Elkas, Liam Finn, Bahamas, Zeus, White Cowbell Oklahoma, The Balconies, Hexes and Ohs, Rich Aucoin, Jason Collett, State Radio.

The band has welcomed two new members to their current line up while Grassia has moved from keyboards to the drum kit. The band is currently in production of their 4th studio album which is due to be released in the spring of 2014.

== Discography ==
- The Golden Dogs (2002, Original Six Song EP Indie Release)
- Everything in 3 Parts (2003, Full-Length Indie Release)
- Everything in 3 Parts (2004, Re-release from True North Records/Universal Records)
- Big Eye Little Eye (2006, True North Records)
- Coat of Arms (2010, Nevado Records (CAN))
- Coat of Arms (2011, Dine Alone Records (US))

== Videography and singles ==
- "Can't Get Your Face Out of My Head" (2004)
- "Yeah!" (2005)
- "Never Meant Any Harm" (2006)
- "Construction Worker" (2007)
- "Construction Worker / Lester" 7 inch vinyl (2008)

== See also ==
- Music of Canada
- Canadian rock
- List of Canadian musicians
- List of bands from Canada
