= Hayden (musician) =

Canadian musician (born 1971)

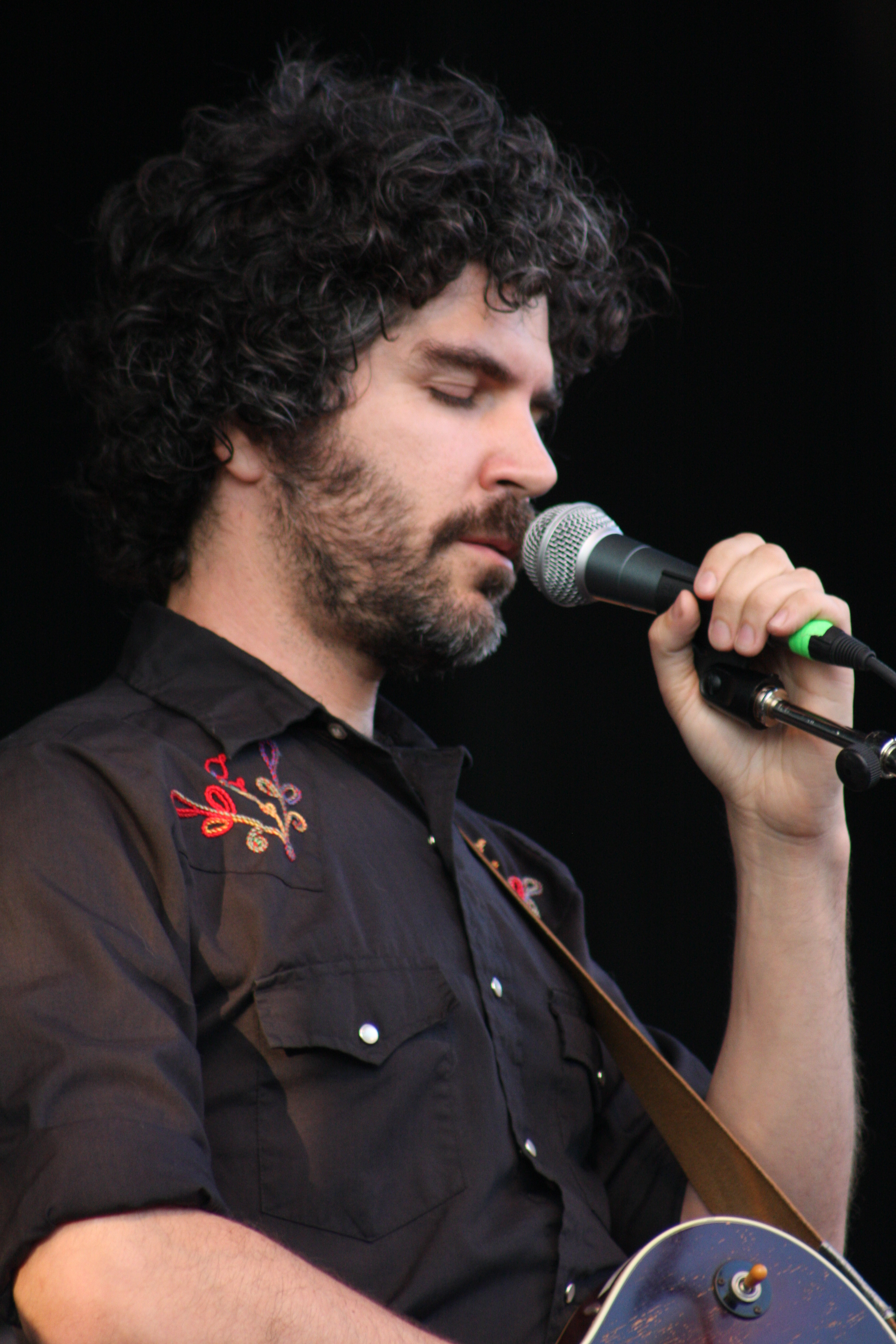
- Hayden performing at the Ottawa Bluesfest, July 2008.

Background information
- Also known as: Hayden Desser
- Born: Paul Hayden Desser; February 12, 1971 (age 55); Thornhill, Ontario, Canada
- Genres: Indie folk; alternative country; acoustic rock; folk rock; lo-fi
- Occupations: Singer; songwriter; record label owner
- Instruments: Vocals; guitar; piano; harmonica; mellotron
- Years active: 1994–present
- Labels: Hardwood; Arts & Crafts; Outpost; Geffen; Universal Music Canada; Fat Possum; Loose Music; Sonic Unyon
- Website: www.wasteyourdaysaway.com

Paul Hayden Desser (born February 12, 1971), who records as Hayden, is a Canadian singer-songwriter from Thornhill, Ontario.

His early works are a largely eclectic mix of genres from grunge to alternative country, as demonstrated by his first full album, Everything I Long For, released in 1995.

== Early life and education ==
Hayden performing at the Cedar Culture Center in Minneapolis, October 2004. Wayne Petti of Cuff the Duke is in the background.

Desser's father is Sherwin Desser, a retired University of Toronto professor of parasitology and current visual artist. Desser received a B.A.A. in Radio and Television Arts from Ryerson Polytechnical Institute (now Toronto Metropolitan University) in 1993.

== Career ==
Hayden entered his song "Take" in for CFNY-FM's annual New Music Search competition in 1993. Hayden played guitar on the track and enlisted two friends (Lorraine Ursomarzo and Noah Mintz of hHead) to sing vocals. Hayden continued to recruit vocalists until 1995 when he began to showcase his grainy baritone. "Take" has never been officially released on any of Hayden's albums.

Hayden released an independent cassette, In September, in 1994, and followed with the album Everything I Long For in 1995. Released on his own Hardwood Records with distribution by Sonic Unyon, the album was a commercial success. He subsequently found himself in a bidding war between record labels in the United States, with one early offer coming directly from Neil Young, whose manager Elliott Roberts had just launched Vapor Records.

He ultimately signed to Geffen Records' subsidiary imprint Outpost Recordings, which gave him a contract worth over $1 million, along with complete creative control of his music, in what was widely reported as one of the most lucrative contracts ever given to a new artist in the alternative rock era. Outpost rereleased the album in the US the following year. Also in 1996, Hayden performed both nights of Neil Young's annual Bridge School Concert, and contributed the title track to the soundtrack for Steve Buscemi's film Trees Lounge.

For his second album, 1998's The Closer I Get, Hayden worked with several big name record producers, including Steve Fisk, John Hanlon and Scott Litt. He toured North America with a full band, including Josh Malinsky and Mitch Roth of Poledo and Damon Richardson of Change of Heart, to support that album. However, Outpost was subsequently dissolved due to the commercial decline of alternative rock in the late 1990s, leaving Hayden without an international label.

In 2001, Hayden distributed 100 hand-written, packaged and numbered copies of Skyscraper National Park to friends and independent record shops throughout Toronto. This was quickly followed by an additional 1,500 hand-numbered copies, this time with professionally printed liner notes. These copies were primarily sold at live shows. The critical success of these two limited-edition runs led to a full commercial release of the recording later that same year.

In 2004, Hayden released his follow up album, Elk Lake Serenade, and toured North America with Oshawa's Cuff the Duke acting as his back-up band. He subsequently released In Field & Town in 2008, and The Place Where We Lived in 2009.

In 2010, he produced the debut album of singer-songwriter Lou Canon, his sister-in-law. It was his first time producing material for another artist.

In November 2012, it was announced that Hayden would release his seventh studio album on Canadian indie label Arts & Crafts, and would play five shows in Europe as a warm up to his performance at All Tomorrow's Parties Festival, curated by the National. These were Hayden's first live performances since his two-song set at a benefit in Ontario over a year earlier.

On February 5, 2013, Hayden released his seventh full-length studio album Us Alone on Arts & Crafts, his first release on a record label besides his own Hardwood Records. The album is largely biographical in nature, with tracks like "Almost Everything" noting how family now takes precedence over art in his life, and "Instructions", which details what he wants done with his body when he dies. In June 2013, the album was longlisted for the 2013 Polaris Music Prize.

In February 2023 he released the single "Miss Fort Erie", his first new music since 2015. He followed up at the end of the month with the announcement that his new album Are We Good will be released April 5, 2023, on Arts & Crafts; the announcement was accompanied by the release of the album's second preview track, a duet with Feist titled "On a Beach". Actor Steve Buscemi and musician Matt Berninger of The National appeared in the song's video.

Are We Good received a Juno Award nomination for Adult Alternative Album of the Year at the Juno Awards of 2024.

== Promotion ==
Often described in the press as somewhat reclusive and private, since the end of his international tour to support The Closer I Get Hayden has often limited his active promotional appearances and undertaken only small-scale touring. As early as 2002, friends were jokingly referring to his concert dates to support Skyscraper National Park as "the Hayden's Not Dead Tour", and there was already at least one Usenet group devoted primarily to tracking rumoured Hayden sightings.

He also undertook virtually no promotional efforts for his 2009 album The Place Where We Lived.

In 2010, an erroneous rumour that he had died was propagated in several online venues, including Wikipedia; The Globe and Mail music critic Robert Everett-Green has speculated that the rumour may have been caused by confusion with Canadian R&B singer Haydain Neale, who died in November 2009.

Upon the release of his follow-up album Us Alone in 2013, he joked that "I think I realized that you need to let people know you have a record out," and acknowledged that the death rumour was a key influence on his decision to sign with Arts & Crafts, rather than continuing to handle his promotional efforts on his own.

In recent years, Hayden has organized and performed at Dream Serenade, an annual charity concert in Toronto to benefit children with special needs.

== Hardwood records ==
In Canada, almost all of Hayden's albums have been issued by Hardwood Records, a small music label he owns. Hardwood's distribution was handled by Sonic Unyon for Everything I Long For, and by Universal Music Canada thereafter. From its inception in 1994 until 2005, Hayden's own albums were all that the Hardwood label carried, but since then the label has also released albums by Cuff the Duke, Basia Bulat and Lou Canon.

His 2013 album Us Alone was his first album to be released on Arts & Crafts.

== Discography ==
=== Studio albums ===
- Everything I Long For (1995, Hardwood/Sonic Unyon in Canada; 1996, Outpost (Geffen) Records in US)
- The Closer I Get (May 12, 1998, Hardwood/Universal Music Canada in Canada, Outpost (Geffen) Records in US)
- Skyscraper National Park (October 16, 2001, Hardwood/Universal Music Canada/Loose Music)
- Elk-Lake Serenade (2004, Hardwood/Universal Music Canada/Loose Music)
- In Field & Town (January 15, 2008, Hardwood/Universal Music Canada)
- The Place Where We Lived (May 26, 2009, Hardwood/Universal Music Canada)
- Us Alone (February 5, 2013, Arts & Crafts)
- Hey Love (March 24, 2015, Arts & Crafts)
- Are We Good (2023, Arts & Crafts)
- The Recent Past (2026, Arts & Crafts)

=== EPs and singles and others ===
- In September (1994, Cassette, Paul Records/Hardwood Records (1994)
- "Mild and Hazy" (1996, 7", Hardwood/Lunamoth)
- "Lunar Landing Confirmed" (1996, 7", split with Poledo, Squirtgun Records)
- Moving Careful (1996, EP, Sonic Unyon/Hardwood)
- "Carry On Mentality" (1997, 7", Landspeed Records)
- Live at Convocation Hall (2002, Live album, Hardwood/Universal Music Canada)
