= Harold L. Goodwin =

American novelist (1914–1990)

- Born: Harold Leland Goodwin; November 20, 1914
- Died: February 18, 1990 (aged 75)
- Occupation: Writer
- Children: 3
- Writing career
- Pen name: Harold L. Goodwin; Hal Goodwin; Harold Leland Goodwin; Blake Savage; John Blaine
- Genre: Science fiction

Harold Leland Goodwin (November 20, 1914 – February 18, 1990) was an American writer.

== Biography and writing career ==
Known to his friends as Hal Goodwin, Goodwin wrote popular science books, mostly about space exploration, as Harold L. Goodwin, "Hal Goodwin" and "Harold Leland Goodwin". He also wrote children's books as Blake Savage (Rip Foster Rides the Gray Planet) and John Blaine (the Rick Brant series). In the latter case, he co-wrote (with Peter J. Harkins) the first three books in the series and wrote books 4 through 24 by himself.

In 1947, he wrote The Feathered Cape, a boy's adventure novel set in Hawaii. It was based on events leading up to the Battle of the Nu'uanu Valley (1795) in the war for Hawaiian unification.

He had three sons from two different marriages; Alan, Chris and Derek. He died from cardiac arrest.
