= The Guthries =

Canadian country rock band

- Origin: Halifax, Nova Scotia, Canada
- Genres: Country rock; alt-country; Americana
- Years active: 1998–2002
- Labels: Brobdingnagian; Hay Sale
- Past members: Ruth Minnikin; Dale Murray; Gabe Minnikin; Serge Samson; Brian Murray; Matt Mays

The Guthries were a Canadian country rock band based in Halifax, Nova Scotia. They released two albums in the early 2000s.

== History ==
The Guthries formed in 1998 in Halifax. Originally formed by vocalist Ruth Minnikin and Dale Murray, the band included their respective siblings Gabe Minnikin and Brian Murray, as well as high school friends Serge Samson and Matt Mays. Early line-ups included Nick Bevan-John (Hotel Faces, Jack MacDonald, Ceti Alpha) and Tim-Jim Baker (Matt Mays & El Torpedo).

The band's first album was Off Windmill, released in 2000. Mays subsequently left the band in 2002, just prior to the release of the band's second release, the self-titled The Guthries. The band toured extensively throughout Canada and the UK. Following that album, however, the band members each began pursuing solo projects, and have not released another Guthries album.

== Members ==
- Ruth Minnikin (vocals, accordion, acoustic guitar, piano, organ)
- Dale Murray (vocals, lead guitar, pedal steel)
- Gabe Minnikin (vocals, guitar, accordion, mandolin, organ, piano)
- Brian Murray (drums, banjo)
- Serge Samson (bass, mandolin)
- Matt Mays (vocals, acoustic/lead guitar)

== Discography ==
- 2000: Off Windmill
- 2002: The Guthries

== Awards and nominations ==
Year	Association	Category	Result
2001	Canadian Country Music Association	Roots Artist or Group of the Year	Nominated
