= La Fin du Monde (album) =

Studio album by The Hylozoists
- Released: June 20, 2006
- Recorded: 2005
- Genre: Instrumental rock
- Label: Boompa
- Producer: The Hylozoists

The Hylozoists chronology
La Nouvelle Gauche (2000)	La Fin du Monde (2006)	L'Île de Sept Villes (2009)

La Fin du Monde is the second album by the Toronto-based instrumental band The Hylozoists.

== Track listing ==
1. "The Fifty Minute Hour"
2. "Elementary Particles"
3. "Smiley Smiley"
4. "Strait is the Gate"
5. "Hearts and Harps"
6. "Warning Against Judging a Christian Brother"
7. "If Only Your Heart Was a Major Sixth"
8. "Man Who Almost Was"
9. "Lover Becomes Lovers"
10. "Journey to the End of the Night"
11. "La Fin du Monde"
