= Noah Mintz =

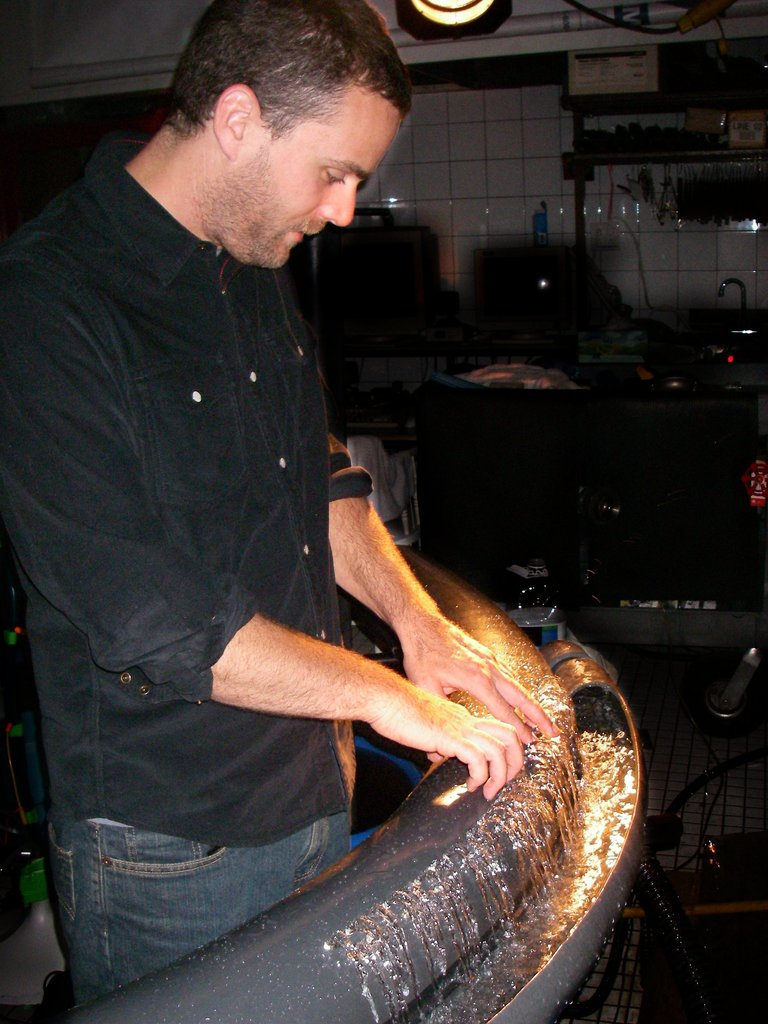
- Mintz playing hydraulophone

Background information
- Origin: Canada
- Genres: Rock
- Occupations: Singer-songwriter, guitarist, mastering engineer
- Instrument: Guitar
- Website: www.noahmintz.com

Noah Mintz (born September 1970) is a Canadian rock singer-songwriter, guitarist and mastering engineer. Mintz founded the band hHead with Brendan Canning in the 1990s. He released solo material under the name Noah's Arkweld following the breakup of hHead. Leslie Feist was the original bass player of Noah's Arkweld.

He works as a mastering engineer at the Toronto studio Lacquer Channel, where he has worked on albums by The Constantines, Sarah Harmer, Arkells, Broken Social Scene, Billy Talent, Death from Above 1979, Dual, The Marble Index, Danko Jones, Rheostatics, The Dears, Len, Hayden, This Rigid Empire, Uncle Seth and Stars.

== Discography ==
=== hHead ===
- Potato E.P. (1991)
- Fireman (1992)
- Jerk (1994)
- Ozzy (1996)
- Rare and Odd (1991-1997) (2017) Digital Release

=== Noah's Arkweld ===
- Fun! (1997)
- Names for Shapes That Don't Exist (2009)
