= Hardwood Records =

Canadian independent record label

- Founded: 1994
- Founder: Hayden Desser
- Distributor(s): Geffen Records
- Genre: Indie rock Canadian music
- Country of origin: Canada
- Location: Toronto, Ontario
- Official website: http://www.hardwoodrecords.com/

Hardwood Records is a Canadian independent record label, owned and operated by singer-songwriter Hayden. Originally formed to distribute his own albums, the label has also released albums by Cuff the Duke, Basia Bulat and Lou Canon.

== See also ==
- List of record labels
