= Julian Taylor (singer) =

Canadian singer-songwriter

Background information
- Born: January 5, 1978 (age 48)
- Origin: Toronto, Ontario
- Genres: Rock, folk, pop, Americana
- Occupation: Singer-songwriter
- Instruments: Vocals, guitar
- Labels: Warner, Howling Turtle
- Website: juliantaylormusic.ca

Julian Taylor (born Julian Dean Ebonluwa Taylor, January 5, 1978 in Toronto, Ontario), is a Canadian singer-songwriter and radio personality. His musical style consists of rock, folk, soul, roots, country, and Americana. Taylor is known as one of the founding members of the Canadian alt-rock band Staggered Crossing.

== Early life ==
Taylor was born on January 5, 1978, in Toronto and is of mixed Caribbean and of Mohawk descent. He is the son of Caribbean-Mohawk realtor Donna Skanks and professional photographer and classical pianist Antigua-born Hudson Taylor. Taylor's maternal grandmother is the Canadian dancer, choreographer, and teacher Ola Skanks. Taylor's maternal aunt is Marianne Skanks, a dancer, model, and designer. Taylor's maternal great-aunt is NDP politician Zanana Akande, the first Black female Member of Provincial Parliament in Ontario. Taylor's cousins are Kahnawà:ke drummer Gene Diabo and bass player Barry Diabo who played on Taylor's album The Ridge.

Growing up, Taylor spent his summers with his maternal grandparents in Maple Ridge, British Columbia. "We lived on a little farm. We had horses, we had chickens, my grandparents bred boxers as well, so I got to spend my summers on the left coast with them," Taylor said.

== Musical career ==
=== 1990–2000s: The beginnings ===
Taylor started playing piano at age 5. He learned acoustic guitar over summer campfires and sang in choirs with his cousins under the supervision of his uncle. "I sang and played piano at a very young age. I started making up songs when I was just four years old," said Taylor. As a teenager, Taylor continued with his music but also enjoyed playing sports, especially hockey. His cousin is retired NHLer Jamal Mayers. Taylor started playing in bands (Caught in the Weeds, Simulated Bacon Bits, The Weeds, and The Midnight Blues) during high school at North Toronto Collegiate, and later at The School of Liberal Arts. Taylor's first gig was at The Mocambo in 1994 for the Battle of the Bands as part of The Weeds with saxophonist Dave Sikula.

=== 1995–2007: Staggered Crossing ===
In 1995, Taylor and three high school friends (David Marshall, Dan Black, and Jeremy Elliott) formed Staggered Crossing. It consisted of lead singer, songwriter, and guitarist Julian Taylor, drummer Jeremy Elliott, bassist Dan Black, guitarist Bruce Adamson, and keyboardist/guitarist Darrell O'Dea. Their first gigs were at neighbourhood North Toronto locals like the Rose and Crown, Corner Café, and Mad Monty's.

In 1996, Staggered Crossing recorded their first EP, Mold, with Toronto musician and producer Darrell O'Dea. These early recordings were heard by record executive Frank Davies, who saw Staggered Crossing's potential and signed the group to The Music Publisher (TMP). Davies' company invested in Staggered Crossing, marketing the group to all major labels and arranging private showcases.

After Marshall left the band in 1997, and O'Dea and Bruce Adamson were added, the new lineup gigged at places like The El Mocambo, The Horseshoe Tavern, The Reverb, Lee's Palace, and The Orbit Room. In 1999, Warner Music Canada signed them.

Later that year, the band signed with manager Larry Wanagas, founder of Bumstead Records, who had managed acts such as Big Sugar, k.d. lang, Susan Aglukark, The Trews, and BOY. On February 27, 2001, Staggered Crossing released their self-titled full-length debut album in Canada. The band's debut single, "Further Again," reached #7 on the Canadian rock charts and ended the year as the sixth most played song on rock radio in Canada. "A Million Works of Art" and "Old Man" were also released as singles. The debut album went on to sell 15,000 copies in Canada, according to SoundScan.

StagX toured across Canada, sharing stages with Midnight Oil, 54-40, Blue Rodeo, Big Sugar, Spirit of the West, Nickelback, The Guess Who, Wide Mouth Mason, and Crowbar. Other highlights included an appearance on Open Mike with Mike Bullard.

Following the band breakup, Taylor launched his own record label, Bent Penny Records and independently released the band's next two albums, Last Summer When We Were Famous (2002). These albums were produced with one of Taylor's musical heroes, Wilco's Jay Bennett, and Burgundy & Blue (2004). During this period, Taylor developed his skills in music production, business operations, and radio promotion. Notably, his work helped secure Perfect Prize as the highest-charting independent rock single in Canada in 2005 at #17 on Canada's Rock Chart.

On August 2, 2007, the band announced its breakup due to a lack of time. One final show was played at The Horseshoe Tavern in Toronto on November 2, 2007. However, the band continued to play together on an informal basis for numerous years.

Taylor went on a three-year hiatus from music and took a bartending gig at Noonan's pub on the Danforth in Toronto. John and Dora Keogh suggested he start an open stage night, which turned into a 10-year run for Taylor as the RiverBoat open mic host at Dora Keogh Irish Pub (later known as Noonan's Pub), located right next to the Danforth Hall, later hosted by singer-songwriter Tyler Ellis.

"Those open mic nights renewed my passion for, and faith in, the music," says Taylor. "Ben Spivak, my former roommate, who now plays in Magic! and longtime friend and bandmate Jeremy Elliott decided to try our hand at playing some gigs as a trio. The trio called themselves The Barbs, which eventually morphed into The Julian Taylor Band."

=== 2014–present: Julian Taylor Band ===
In 2014, the Julian Taylor Band was born, which included the release of Tech Noir (2014), followed by Desert Star (2015). These albums showcased his fusion of funk, rock, R&B, and pop, with Taylor noted for his strong hooks and genre-crossing style.

== Albums ==
=== The Ridge (2020) ===
Taylor's solo breakout came with the release of The Ridge, on June 19, 2020, a largely acoustic, roots-inspired album reflecting on personal experiences and family history. It earned him two Juno Award nominations, Contemporary Roots Album of the Year and Indigenous Artist or Group of the Year), a Canadian Folk Music Award for Solo Artist of the Year, and a Polaris Music Prize nomination. In addition, The Ridge was also nominated for two Juno Awards (Contemporary Folk Album Of The Year, Indigenous Artist Or Group Of The Year), the Polaris Prize Long List, a Summer Solstice Indigenous Award, a Canadian Music Week INDIES Award, and a Canadian Folk Music Award. In 2022 Taylor won best male artist in the International Acoustic Music Awards and scored five Native American Music Award nominations.

=== Beyond the Reservoir (2022) ===
Taylor's 2022 follow-up, Beyond the Reservoir, explored themes of resilience, grief, and coming of age and was nominated for a Juno Award (Contemporary Indigenous Artist of the Year), a Country Music Association of Ontario Award (Roots Artist of the Year), and multiple Ontario Folk Music Awards. Both albums are regarded as deeply personal works that solidified Taylor's voice in contemporary Canadian roots music.

=== Anthology Vol. I (2023) ===
In October 2023, Taylor announced the release of Anthology Vol. 1, a retrospective collection spanning his work with Staggered Crossing, the Julian Taylor Band, and his solo material. The anthology also includes new tracks, symbolizing both a reflection on his career and a celebration of regaining ownership of his musical catalogue.

=== Pathways (2024) ===
On September 27, 2024, Julian Taylor released Pathways, his third solo album following the acclaimed The Ridge (2020) and Beyond the Reservoir (2022). Co-produced with Grammy winner Colin Linden known as the musical director on the ABC TV show Nashville and his work with Greg Allman, The Band, T Bone Burnett, Bruce Cockburn, Bob Dylan, Rihannon Giddens, Emmylou Harris, Keb' Mo', Pistol Annies, John Prine, and Lucinda Williams, Pathways explores themes of identity, resilience, and self-reflection through stripped-back arrangements and introspective lyrics. The title track, a duet with multi Grammy award winner Allison Russell, and songs like "Weighing Down" highlight Taylor's continued evolution as a songwriter. The album has received positive reviews from outlets including Americana UK, No Depression, and KLOF Magazine.

=== Anthology Vol. II (2026) ===
In December 2025, Taylor announced the upcoming release of a double compilation album, Anthology Vol. II. Consisting of 20 popular songs from the Staggered Crossing and The Julian Taylor Band days.

== Musical style and influence ==
Taylor said that his family has always been very musical. His grandfather loved blues music, his father played classical piano, and Taylor sang in a church choir. Taylor was influenced by a diverse range of musical genres, including soul, hip-hop, blues, Americana, and 1990s alternative rock. Taylor said his biggest influences came in waves and stages:

"Well, there's different stages of when I was growing up, I think and each one of those different stages affected me differently. When I was young, it would have been 80s pop because that's what I was listening to in my house. The big records were the self-titled Whitney Houston record. Thriller was really big. Talking Book by Stevie Wonder was really big. Billy Ocean was big so that was what was happening in the pop world. Tina Turner. Dire Straits, those records were big. 'Money for Nothing' was certainly massive at the time, and I was young so that, plus Motown, because my mom loved to dance, and she was a go-go dancer. She listened to that, and my dad listened to classical music, and also gospel then there was Nat King Cole. Then it was Bob Dylan, then singer-songwriters as I got older and started my own thing..."

== Radio personality ==
=== ELMNT FM ===
From 2018 to 2022, Taylor hosted The Afternoon Drive Show on ELMNT FM in addition to his musical career.

=== Julian Taylor's Jukebox ===
In 2020, Taylor launched his own syndicated three-hour radio show, the Julian Taylor's Jukebox, airing across Canada, the U.S., and the Caribbean. In 2024 and in 2025, the Jukebox won the Community Radio Awards in Broadcast and Online (CRABO) for Syndicated Programming, which recognizes excellence in non-profit and campus radio stations across Canada, administered by the NCRA/ANREC.

== Television and film ==
Taylor's songs have appeared in television series including Degrassi: The Next Generation, Elementary, Haven, Kim's Convenience, Private Eyes, and the 2025 television comedy Cows Come Home.

== Tributes, special events, and collaborations ==
In 2002, Taylor performed at the Salt Lake City Olympics, and at the 2010 Winter Olympics in Vancouver.

In 2022, Taylor collaborated with singer-songwriter Allison Russell for the single Pathways.

In 2023, Taylor collaborated with Indian City, Kelly Bado, and Gabrielle Fontaine, the daughter of the late Vince Fontaine for the single Good People.

In 2024, Allison Russell invited Julian Taylor to participate in the Robbie Robertson tribute at the Kia Forum in Los Angeles. Life Is a Carnival: A Musical Celebration, the Robbie Robertson tribute concert, was filmed by film director Martin Scorsese. The Don Was-led players were on stage for most of it, as part a large ensemble performing music originated by The Band including Eric Clapton, Van Morrison, Mavis Staples, Taj Mahal, Eric Church, Nathaniel Rateliff, Jim James, Bobby Weir, Lucinda Williams, Warren Haynes, Bruce Hornsby, Robert Randolph, Daniel Lanois, and Logan Staats.

On July 8, 2024, Taylor shared the stage with American rock singer-songwriter Steve Earle at the Danforth Hall in Toronto.

In 2025, Taylor collaborated with Jim Cuddy of Blue Rodeo for the single Tulsa Time. Taylor and Cuddy "got together to sing the Don Williams song at The Horseshoe Tavern as part of a Christmas fundraiser for the Daily Bread Food Bank and later revisited it during the 2023 JUNO Awards at The Carleton in Halifax."

In 2025, Taylor recorded a cover of Joel Plaskett's "Compete with Loneliness" for the Plaskett tribute album Songs from the Gang to celebrate Plaskett's birthday.

In June 2025, Taylor was invited to join the Mariposa Festival 65th Anniversary by Serena Ryder who also invited Martha Wainwright, Hawksley Workman, Irish Mythen, Tom Wilson, and Tara Lightfoot to join her on the Lightfoot stage.

On October 9, 2025, Taylor was invited to perform for the multi-day You Got Gold: Celebrating the Life & Songs of John Prine tribute at the Basement East in Nashville, Tennessee, organized by The Hello in There Foundation and John Prine family.

In November 2025, Taylor was invited to perform at the NY80: A Celebration of Neil Young and His Music along with Jim Cuddy, Dallas Green, Serena Ryder, Donovan Wood, Kathleen Edwards, Charlotte Cornfield, Big Sugar's Gordie Johnson, the OBGMs, SATE, Skye Wallace, Ruby Waters, William Prince, Joel Plaskett, Matt Mays, Rose Cousins, Bry Webb, Tom Wilson, Thompson Wilson, Luke Doucet, Sarah Harmer, Glenn Milchem of Blue Rodeo, Shamus Currie of The Sheepdogs, Ian Blurton, Dani Nash, Carleigh Aikins, Thom Hammerton, Brian Kobayakawa, Doug McBrien, Nick Rose from Dwayne Gretzky, and Anna Ruddick. The event was hosted by CBC host and musician Tom Power under the direction of musical director Aaron Goldstein.

== Advocacy and charity work ==
Taylor is a music, Indigenous, and Black rights advocate and served on several music industry boards and committees, such as the Toronto Music Advisory Committee (TMAC), the Country Music Association of Ontario, The Unison Fund, and the Toronto Blues Society, and remains active in educational and cultural outreach, particularly around Truth and Reconciliation Day in Canada.

Taylor is an active supporter and advocate of The Bruce Adamson Bursary Fund, the Toronto Indigenous Harm Reduction, L'Arche Toronto, the Black Boys Code, the Downie Wenjack Fund, Artscan Circle, Daily Bread Food Bank, Water First, Canadian Women's Foundation, Shine Concert, Crohn's and Colitis Canada, and Bereaved Families of Toronto.

In 2001, following the Song Corporation bankruptcy, Taylor and his old Staggered Crossing bandmates played a key role in the landmark Canadian court case that followed. This case led to changes in bankruptcy law, ensuring that ownership of unpublished compositions reverts to artists rather than being treated as corporate assets. Taylor later founded the record label Howling Turtle Inc., which oversees his music catalogue and business affairs.

Singles
| Track | Released | Duration |
|---|---|---|
| Old Man Sitting By The Fire ^{1} | Feb 27, 2001 | 06:07 |
| Business As Usual ^{1} | Aug 15, 2002 | 03:38 |
| A Million Works of Art ^{1} | Feb 16, 2001 | 04:29 |
| Further Again ^{1} | Feb 16, 2001 | 04:22 |
| Fever ^{2} | Aug 5, 2015 | 02:53 |
| Coke Bottle Candy ^{2} | Sept 16, 2016 | 03:25 |
| Chemical Low ^{2} | Mar 24, 2017 | 03:28 |
| Feel Your Love ^{2} | Aug 4, 2017 | 03:25 |
| Give Us A Sign ^{2} | Oct 20, 2017 | 04:03 |
| Ben McCulloch | May 17, 2019 | 04:07 |
| Ballad Of A Young Troubadour | Jun 8, 2020 | 05:34 |
| The Ridge | Jun 19, 2020 | 05:06 |
| It's Not Enough | Feb 3, 2020 | 04:32 |
| 100 Proof | Oct 15, 2022 | 03:58 |
| Seeds | Jun 24, 2022 | 04:00 |
| Wide Awake | Aug 19, 2022 | 04:18 |
| Murder 13 | Oct 14, 2022 | 04:13 |
| Stolen Lands | Oct 14, 2022 | 06:10 |
| Opening the Sky | Sept 16, 2022 | 04:17 |
| City Song | Sept 8, 2023 | 06:08 |
| Georgia Moon | Jul 26, 2023 | 04:09 |
| Pathways | Aug 21, 2024 | 03:31 |
| Ain't Life Strange | Jul 10, 2024 | 04:04 |
| Running Away | May 29, 2024 | 04:54 |
| Weighing Down | Apr 17, 2024 | 03:52 |
| Tulsa Time | Jun 22, 2025 | 03:21 |
| Compete With Loneliness | Apr 11, 2025 | 02:03 |
| Dedication | Jun 11, 2025 | 03:11 |
| Don't Let 'Em (Get Inside of Your Head) | Oct 22, 2025 | 03:23 |
| Drive | Aug 12, 2026 | 03.26 |

1. Staggered Crossing
2. The Julian Taylor Band

Studio Albums and EPs
| Title | Year | Label |
|---|---|---|
| Mold (EP) ^{1} | 1997 | Independent |
| Staggered Crossing (EP) ^{1} | Sept 9, 2000 | Independent |
| Staggered Crossing ^{1} | May 7, 2001 | Warner Music Canada |
| Last Summer When We Were Famous^{1} | Aug 15, 2002 | Bent Penny Records |
| Burgundy and Blue ^{2} | Oct 19, 2004 | Bent Penny Records |
| Blank Tape Levy (CD) ^{2} | Mar 9, 2009 | Bent Penny Records |
| Absence of the Sun ^{2} | Jul 14, 2011 | Independent |
| Tech Noir ^{2} | Mar 31, 2014 | Independent |
| Desert Star ^{2} | Oct 7, 2016 | Aporia Records |
| Avalanche ^{2} | Mar 29, 2019 | Gypsy Soul Records |
| The Ridge | Jun 19, 2020 | Howling Turtle |
| Beyond the Reservoir | Oct 14, 2022 | Howling Turtle |
| Anthology Vol. 1 | Oct 20, 2023 | Howling Turtle |
| Pathways | Sept 27, 2024 | Howling Turtle |

1. Staggered Crossing
2. The Julian Taylor Band

Live Albums
| Album | Release Date | Label |
|---|---|---|
| Hey Hey Two Two ^{1} | Sept 10, 2010 | Howling Turtle |
| Live at Lee's Palace ^{2} | Oct 6, 2017 | Aporia Records |
| Live at TD Music Hall | Dec 6, 2024 | Howling Turtle |

1. Staggered Crossing
2. The Julian Taylor Band

== Awards and nominations ==
| Year | Award | Category | Nominee/Work | Result | Ref |
|---|---|---|---|---|---|
| 2014 | Toronto Independent Music Awards | Best Group | Julian Taylor Band | Nominated | |
| 2015 | Indigenous Music Awards | Best Group | Julian Taylor Band | Nominated | |
| 2015 | Black Canadian Awards | Best Jazz/Soul Act | Julian Taylor Band | Nominated | |
| 2017 | Indigenous Music Awards | Best Rock Album | Julian Taylor Band | Nominated | |
| 2021 | Juno Awards of 2021 | Contemporary Roots Album of the Year | The Ridge, Julian Taylor | Nominated | |
| 2021 | Juno Awards of 2021 | Indigenous Artist or Band | Julian Taylor | Nominated | |
| 2021 | 16th Canadian Folk Music Awards | Solo Artist of the Year | The Ridge, Julian Taylor | Nominated | |
| 2021 | 16th Canadian Folk Music Awards | English Songwriter of the Year | Julian Taylor | Nominated | |
| 2021 | Polaris Music Prize | Long listed | The Ridge | Nominated | |
| 2021 | Canadian Music Week Jim Beam INDIE Awards | Indigenous Artist/Group Or Duo of the Year | The Ridge | Nominated | |
| 2021 | Summer Solstice Indigenous Music Award (SSIMA) | Roots Album of the Year | The Ridge | Nominated | |
| 2022 | Native American Music Awards (NAMA) | Best Debut Artist | The Ridge | Nominated | |
| 2022 | Native American Music Awards (NAMA) | Best Country Recording | The Ridge | Nominated | |
| 2022 | Native American Music Awards (NAMA) | Best Male Vocalist | The Ridge | Nominated | |
| 2022 | Native American Music Awards (NAMA) | Best Folk Recording | The Ridge | Nominated | |
| 2022 | Native American Music Awards (NAMA) | Best Country Video | The Ridge | Nominated | |
| 2022 | Canadian Folk Music Awards | Solo Artist of the Year | Beyond the Reservoir | Won | |
| 2023 | Juno Awards of 2023 | Contemporary Indigenous Artist of the Year | Beyond the Reservoir | Nominated | |
| 2023 | 18th Canadian Folk Music Awards | Single of the Year | 100 Proof | Nominated | |
| 2023 | Folk Music Ontario | Performing Artist of the Year | Beyond the Reservoir | Won | |
| 2023 | Country Music Association of Ontario Awards | Roots Artist of the Year | Beyond the Reservoir | Nominated | |
| 2024 | Native American Music Awards (NAMA) | Best Americana Recording | Good People | Won | |
| 2024 | 19th Canadian Folk Music Awards | Contemporary Singer of the Year | Beyond the Reservoir | Nominated | |
| 2024 | 19th Canadian Folk Music Awards | Solo Artist of the Year | Beyond the Reservoir | Nominated | |
| 2024 | 19th Canadian Folk Music Awards | Single of the Year | Seeds | Nominated | |
| 2024 | Canadian Music Week Jim Beam INDIE Awards | Roots/Folk Artist of the Year | Beyond the Reservoir | Nominated | |
| 2024 | Juno Awards of 2024 | Contemporary Roots Album of the Year | Beyond the Reservoir | Nominated | |
| 2025 | Juno Awards of 2025 | Contemporary Roots Album of the Year | Pathways | Nominated | |
| 2025 | International Folk Music Awards | Song of the Year (co-written with Tyler Ellis) | Love Letters | Nominated | |
| 2025 | Folk Music Ontario | Song of the Year | Weighing Down | Nominated | |
| 2025 | Folk Music Ontario | Recording Artist of the Year | Weighing Down | Nominated | |
| 2026 | Canadian Folk Music Awards | Contemporary Singer of the Year | Pathways | Won | |
| 2026 | Ontario Folk Music Awards | Performing Artist of the Year | Weighing Down | Nominated | |
