= Liam Corcoran =

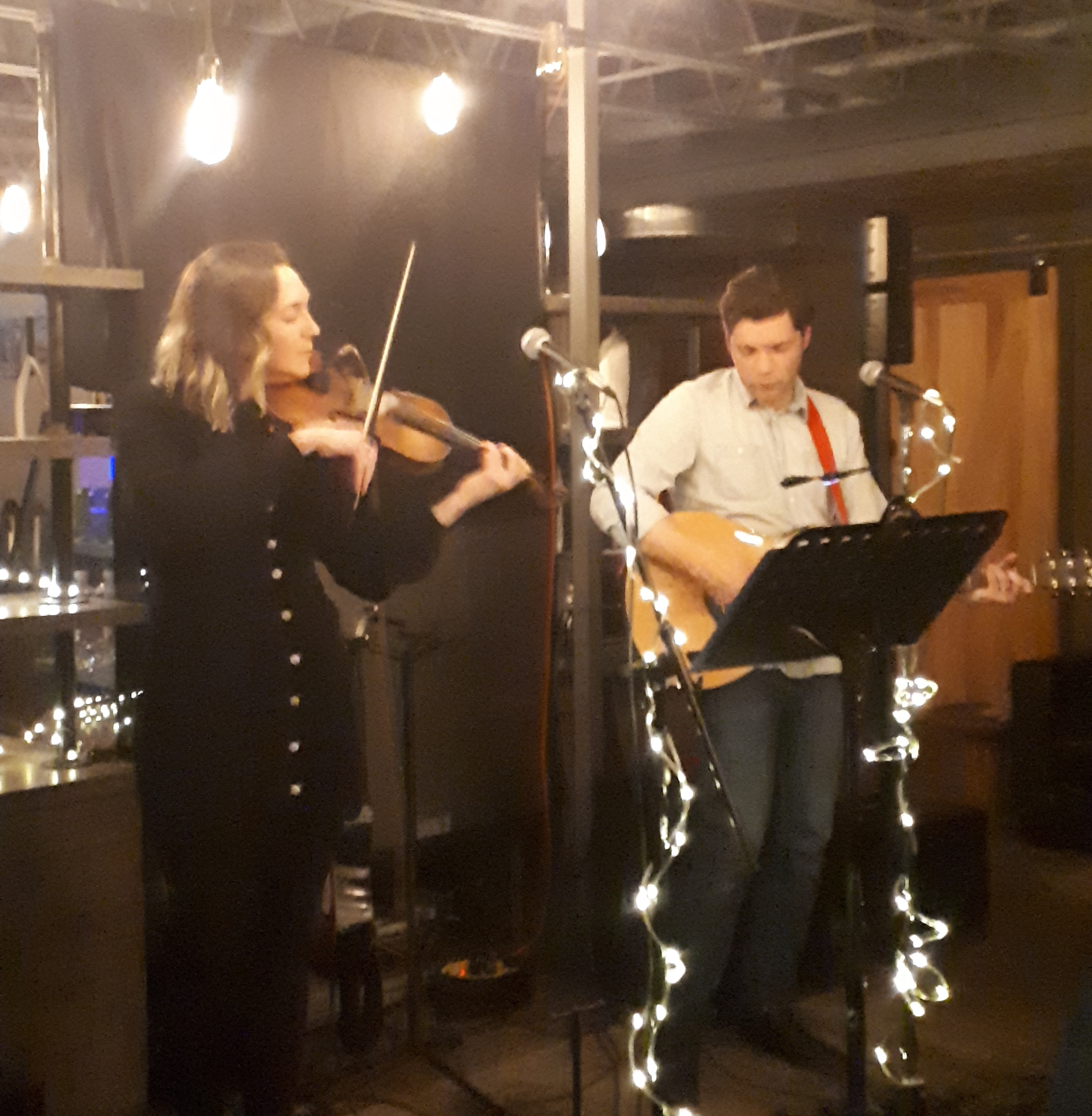

Background information
- Born: July 3, 1984 (age 42)
- Genres: Pop, Rock, Alt-Country, Folk
- Occupation: Singer-songwriter
- Instruments: Voice, Guitar

Liam Corcoran (born July 3, 1984) is a Canadian singer-songwriter based in Charlottetown, Prince Edward Island. He is also the lead singer and co-founder of the indie-pop group Two Hours Traffic.

== Career ==
=== Two Hours Traffic ===
Two Hours Traffic is a Canadian indie rock band. Originally active from 2000 to 2013, they reunited in 2018 and continue to record and perform. Hailing from Charlottetown, Prince Edward Island, the group are performers of power-pop songs. Core members included Liam Corcoran (lead vocals, guitar), Alec O’Hanley (lead guitar, vocals, keyboards), Andrew MacDonald (bass, lead guitar), and Derek Ellis (drums), with Nathan Gill (bass) replacing O’Hanley in 2011. In the reunited version of the band, Nick Doneff has taken over on lead guitar, with MacDonald returning to bass guitar. Their fourth album, Little Jabs, was short-listed for the Polaris Music Prize. The band held a farewell tour before disbanding in 2013. They reunited in 2018 with select Canadian dates.

Each of the band members is involved in other musical projects: Corcoran pursues a solo career and plays with The Express; O’Hanley is part of Alvvays; Gill is part of North Lakes and Baby God; MacDonald and Ellis are part of Golden Cinema; Doneff records and performs as a solo artist under his own name.

=== The Express ===
The Express is a side project of cousins Liam Corcoran and former Hey Rosetta! member Kinley Dowling. Beginning in 2010, the duo began as an outlet for the artists to explore their songwriting. During this time, Corcoran developed a different compositional voice while Dowling started songwriting. The group is described as both folk and pop, with their debut self-titled album being heavily acousticー Dowling wrote three tracks while Corcoran wrote the rest. The album explores transitions, honesty, youth, new relationships, and experiences, while Corcoran's acoustic guitar and Dowling's violin and viola (even plucked like a mandolin in her track "Sharpshooter") serve as bedrocks. Cuff the Duke member Dale Murray is featured much in this work, not only producing (with "spontaneity over rigid structure"), but also playing frequently. He is sometimes cited as a core member of the Express in his own right. The self-titled album was described by the Graypoint Owl as "one part Two Hours Traffic catchiness, one part Hey Rosetta! sensitivity and one part Cuff the Duke earthiness", receiving the rating of "Proud Hoot (Really Good) + *swoop*".

After this release, the Express went on hiatus as Corcoran and Dowling established their solo careers, but as of February 2020 the group has reconnected and performed.

=== Solo career ===
Following his ensemble experiences with Two Hours Traffic and The Express, Corcoran has developed his career as a solo artist. Although his material continues to exhibit the catchiness of pop, it has grown in other different directions. His debut EP Rom-Drom can be neatly categorized as alt-country, but Nevahland, his first LP, is a stylistically-complex blend of rock, pop, indie, and alt-country. In March 2020, Corcoran released Giving Tree and Other Songs ー an album split into two parts: simple acoustic songs and more elaborately orchestrated songs, each with their own flavour including punk, rock, alt-country, lo-fi, and indie-pop. His first two releases also feature extra-musical themes: Rom-Drom explores separation from a distance, and Nevahland tells the story of three couples fleeing an oncoming disaster. In the summer of 2023, Corcoran released his latest full-length album, Hints and Traces.

== Personal life ==
Liam Corcoran works as the Program Manager for Holland College’s School of Performing Arts (SOPA). He has also worked in other branches of education, notably co-writing a song with students from Prince Street Elementary School. In recent years, Corcoran has become a father and husband; this is encapsulated in his album Giving Tree and Other Songs which reflects ideas of domesticity and fatherhood. Corcoran is a cousin of songwriter and former Hey Rosetta! member Kinley Dowling.

== Discography ==
=== Two Hours Traffic ===
- 2003: The April Storm (EP)
- 2005: Two Hours Traffic
- 2006: Isolator (EP)
- 2007: Little Jabs
- 2009: Territory
- 2012: Siren Spell (EP)
- 2013: Foolish Blood
- 2025: I Never See You Anymore (EP)

=== The Express ===
- 2011: The Express

=== Solo releases ===
- 2015: Rom-Drom (EP)
- 2017: Nevahland
- 2020: Giving Tree and Other Songs
- 2023: Hints and Traces
