= Kinley =

Kinley may refer to:

- KINLEY, Canadian musician
- Kinley (brand), owned by the Coca-Cola Company
- Kinley, Saskatchewan, a village in Canada
- Kinley (name)
