= Atlantis Music Prize =

Annual Canadian award

The Atlantis Music Prize is a music award annually given to the best full-length album from Newfoundland and Labrador, Canada, based only on artistic merit, regardless of genre, sales or record label. The award, established in 2008 by St. John's-based alternative newspaper The Scope, includes a certificate prize of $1000. The award is modeled after the Polaris Music Prize for all of Canada (which in turn is modeled after the Mercury Music Prize in the United Kingdom).

== Jury and selection process ==
No entry fee is required for submission, and all genres of music are included. A shortlist of 10 albums is compiled by more than 30 judges from the area, who each choose five albums, and a second panel of six judges selects the winner at the Atlantis Music Prize Gala.

== Past winners and nominees ==
=== Atlantis Music Prize ===
Year	Winner	Shortlisted Nominees & Albums
2008	Mercy, the Sexton - Another Month	AE Bridger - I Am a Ghostly Leech; Duane Andrews - Raindrops; Hey Rosetta! - Into Your Lungs (and around in your heart and on through your blood); Idlers - Corner; Narrows - Narrows; Slippery Rabbits - La Marée Noire; The Human Soundtrack - Organs for Sale; The Satans - Renovabis Faciem Terrae; Victor Lewis - Good Intentions
2009	Curtis Andrews - The Offering of Curtis Andrews	Amelia Curran - Hunter, Hunter; Chris Kirby - Vampire Hotel; The Class War Kids - Reflection! Rage! Rebellion!; The Dardanelles - The Dardanelles; Errand Boy - Cape Disappointment; Kujo - Kujo; Map to Temenos - O! Sweet Guillotine; The Novaks - Things Fall Apart; The Once - The Once
2010	Gramercy Riffs - It's Heartbreak Pathological Lovers - Calling All Favours	Colonel Craze and the Hunch - Reptilian Lipstick; Duane Andrews and Dwayne Côté - Duane Andrews and Dwayne Côté; Idlers - Keep Out; Jake Nicoll - Wild Machines; Matthew Hornell and the Diamond Minds - Matthew Hornell and the Diamond Minds; McKudo - Kudos; Sherman Downey - Honey For Bees; The Subtitles - Quick and Painless
2011	All the Wiles - Painted	Andrew O'Brien & The Searchers - Songs for Searchers; The Burning Hell - Flux Capacitor; Casual Male - Bonding; Hey Rosetta! - Seeds; John Cossar - Another Bridge to Burn; Mark Bragg & The Butchers - Your Kiss; Monsterbator - Precious Rhino; Repartee - Repartee; The Once - Row Upon Row of the People They Know

=== Borealis Music Prize ===
Year	Winner	Shortlisted Nominees & Albums	Ref
2014	Jon Hynes – Watchful Creatures	Steve Maloney and the Wandering Kind - Steve Maloney and the Wandering Kind; Green and Gold - The Body Knows; Sherman Downey and the Ambiguous Case - The Sun in Your Eyes; Fog Lake - Virgo Indigo	
2015	Hey Rosetta! - Second Sight	Amelia Curran - They Promised You Mercy; Fog Lake - Victoria Park; Kat McLevey - Tell Me Once; Ouroboros - Ouroboros	
2016	Jake Nicoll - Two Things/Half of Nothing	Damn Nature - Damn Nature; Duane Andrews - Conception Bay; Pilot to Bombardier - Wild Bells; Repartee - All Lit Up	
2017	Steve Maloney - The Memory Game	Amelia Curran - Watershed; Fog Lake - Dragonchaser; Kubasonics - Kubfundland; Ouroboros - Kitchuses	

== See also ==
- Polaris Music Prize (Canada)
- Choice Music Prize (Ireland)
- Mercury Music Prize (United Kingdom)
- Prix Constantin (France)
- Shortlist Prize (United States)
