= The Verge (XM) =

Canadian radio station

- Canada
- Broadcast area: Canada; United States
- Frequency: SiriusXM 173
- Branding: The Verge

Programming
- Format: Emerging Canadian rock bands and Canadian Indie/Alternative rock

Ownership
- Owner: SiriusXM Canada

History
- First air date: 2002

Technical information
- Class: Satellite Radio Station

Links
- Website: The Verge

The Verge is a Canadian-operated SiriusXM channel featuring new and emerging rock bands from Canada. The channel is produced in Toronto, Ontario for the entire SiriusXM platform. The channel's former names included Unsigned, and (un)Signed, which indicated that the channel played a combination of signed and unsigned bands. A few American songs, such as Eddie Vedder's cover of Canadian singer-songwriter Indio's "Hard Sun", are played on the channel. In August 2015, The Verge was added to the Sirius channel lineup.

== Radio Unsigned (2002–2005) ==
XM launched the original Unsigned channel (notice no parenthesis) in its rock selection as an outlet for all the unsigned rock bands out there to receive nationwide exposure. In addition to unsigned rock music, one of these bands would also have the opportunity to have Unsigned play their favorite popular band at a certain time each day. A popular show on Unsigned was The R>A>D>A>R Report, which actually started via internet in the late 1990s as a showcase for unsigned rockers. XM Satellite Radio picked up the show for its Unsigned channel, and the show now had a wide audience to broadcast to beginning on January 3, 2003. As Unsigned continued its parade of no-name up and comer rock bands, sister rocker XMU on XM 43 was also growing with its selection of independent and college rock. After a while, it looked as if XMU and Unsigned were slowly becoming the same channel, with similar bands being played. Some XM fans suggested a merger of the two channels, while others suggested niching the playlists a little more. On November 16, 2005, the "merger" people got their wish.

== (un)Signed (2005–2006) ==
In June 2005, the Canadian Radio-television and Telecommunications Commission gave XM's partner, Canadian Satellite Radio, the license to broadcast satellite radio in Canada. With this came some rules and regulations regarding Canadian content, forcing the birth of new channels on the line-up. Some channels were newborns, some were deleted completely and replaced with new ones, Unsigned on the other hand was the only one to be moved and reformatted. Thus, (un)Signed was born. (un)Signed was born as a station for new and emerging rock artists from Canada, and is currently on the entire XM platform in both nations. To maintain 100% Canadian content, The R>A>D>A>R Report was moved to XMU where it continues to broadcast weekly shows with encores. XMU did not receive a name change, but it now makes up more for the loss of the old Unsigned's playlist.

== The Verge (2006–) ==
As of April 17, 2006, (un)Signed has renamed itself The Verge. The station now has DJs scheduled around the clock on extended shifts, and features the series LiVE@theVerge, which airs Wednesdays @ 6ET and replays Sunday @ 9ET. In the past LiVE@theVerge has included performances from Sam Roberts, The New Pornographers, Stars, The Stills, Wintersleep, Small Sins and over 300 artists from their street front studios in Toronto.

In June 2008, The Verge broadcast the Calgary Virgin Festival live. Performances included Matthew Good, The Flaming Lips, Three Days Grace, City and Colour and Stars. In September 2008, The Verge broadcast the Toronto Virgin Festival live, including performances by Oasis, Paul Weller, Bloc Party, MGMT, Silversun Pickups, Stereophonics, Constantines and The Fratellis.

On November 12, 2008, as part of the SiriusXM merger, The Verge moved from channel 52 to channel 87 on the XM service. It is still listed as X052-FM by Mediabase. Channel 52 is now Faction. Radio personality and music journalist Kim Hughes hosted programming in 2010.

This channel, Laugh Attack, Radio Parallèle, and/or ATN-Asian Radio will be preempted by XM Radio Canada in order to air extra NHL play-by-play on channels 235–239.

As of October 2024, the channel primarily carries automated blocks of music.

== Verge Awards ==
In July 2008, XM Canada instituted The Verge Music Awards, an award to be voted on by the fans in conjunction with an XM appointed jury to determine the winner based on "artistic integrity".

The inaugural winners were announced on September 24, 2008, at The Tattoo Rock Parlour in Toronto. The Weakerthans were named Artist of the Year and Hey Rosetta!'s album Into Your Lungs was named Album of the Year.

In the second annual Verge Music Awards, which were handled out on September 22, 2009, and broadcast live-to-air, Dan Mangan was awarded the Verge Artist of the Year and Alexisonfire was given the Verge Album of the Year Award for their cd Old Crows/Young Cardinals.

== On-air ==
- Jeff Leake (2006 - )
- Kelowna Vincent (2006 - 2009)
- Kim Hughes (2007 - 2008)
- Matt Fisher (2011 - 2013)

== Core artists ==
- Arcade Fire
- City and Colour
- Hey Rosetta
- Mother Mother
- Stars
- Hollerado
- Metric
- Yukon Blonde
- Tegan and Sara
- Death from Above 1979

== See also ==
- Triple J from the Australian Broadcasting Corporation (ABC)
- BBC 6 Music
- BBC Radio 1
- Le Mouv'
- MDR Sputnik from the German regional public broadcaster MDR
- FM4 from the Austrian national public broadcaster ORF
