= Staggered Crossing =

Canadian rock band

- Origin: Toronto, Ontario, Canada
- Genres: Rock
- Years active: 1997–2007, 2009–2011, 2020
- Labels: Bent Penny Records (2004-present); Warner(1999-2001)
- Members: Julian Taylor; Dan Black; David E.G. Marshall; Jeremy Elliott
- Past members: Darrell O'Dea; Bruce Adamson

Staggered Crossing, sometimes nicknamed StagX, were a Canadian rock band formed in 1996 in Toronto.

== History ==
=== Early years ===
The original group was formed in 1996 (according to some sources about 1997) in Toronto by four high school friends, Julian Taylor (JT), David E.G. Marshall, Dan Black and Jeremy Elliott. The group quickly gained a local following in North Toronto due to their frequent performances. Later in 1996, they recorded their first EP with Toronto musician and producer, Darrell O'Dea

In 1997, David Marshall quit the group because he had entered the University of Montreal. The group had to find a new lead guitarist. They re-formed the group cast by adding Darrell O'Dea, their producer, and having found a new guitarist Bruce Adamson. Staggered Crossing firmly made their reputation in Toronto and gained a lot of fans playing in the venues such as Lee's Palace, the Horseshoe Tavern, Reverb, the El Mocambo now as a permanent member.

In 1997, producer and publisher, Frank Davies, president of The Music Publisher (TMP), after listening to their first EP signed with them. During their joint cooperation from 1997 to 1999 almost 40 songs were written and recorded by the group.

=== Warner Music (1999–2001) ===
The band were signed to Warner Music Canada in 1999. Later that year, the band signed with manager Larry Wanagas, founder of Bumstead Records, who had managed acts such as Big Sugar, k.d. lang, Susan Aglukark, The Trews, and BOY. On February 27, 2001, Staggered Crossing was released their self-titled full-length debut album in Canada. The band's debut single, "Further Again," reached #7 on the Canadian rock charts and ended the year as the sixth most played song on rock radio in Canada. "A Million Works of Art" and "Old Man" were also released as singles. The debut album went on to sell 15,000 copies in Canada according to SoundScan.

The band continued to tour and perform across Canada with groups such as Big Sugar, Blue Rodeo, Nickelback, The Guess Who, Midnight Oil, 54-40, Wide Mouth Mason, Crowbar, and Spirit of the West. Other highlights included an appearance on Open Mike with Mike Bullard and the Canadian Organization of Campus Activities naming their self-titled album the "Best Contemporary Music Recording of the Year" at Universities and Colleges in 2001.

Bruce Adamson left the group to further his career in publishing and law in 2001. In an attempt to return to the sound of their early years the band parted with producer and band member, Darrell O'Dea. The band also parted ways over creative differences later that year with Warner Music Canada, opting instead to start their own label.

=== Independent Record Label ===
After Staggered Crossing organised their own "publishing company and record label, Bent Penny Records" their former guitarist David Marshall started playing with them since 2001. The band's next album, Last Summer When We Were Famous, was released in August 2002. The album was produced by Jay Bennett of Wilco fame.

In 2004, they released the album Burgundy & Blue. "Perfect Prize" was released as a single and peaked at #17 on Canada's Rock chart.

=== Breakup ===
Following a number of recording sessions referred to as "1978", the year in which all four members were born, the band officially announced their breakup on August 29, 2007. In a press release the band assured fans and the media that their parting was amiable, stating:

... While it would certainly be more fun to announce a break up because of 'creative differences' or because of some monumental and catastrophic fight between bandmates, neither is the case. We simply cannot continue to commit the time, energy and enthusiasm to this band that we love so much. We are still great friends and this change is not the end of our musical collaborations.

The band announced one final show, which was performed at The Horseshoe Tavern in Toronto on November 2, 2007. However, the band continued to play together on an informal basis. Notably, the band reunited for a concert at the Horseshoe Tavern on July 9, 2009, to pay tribute to the music of Jay Walter Bennett, who produced the band's Last Summer When We Were Famous album. Bennett had recently died. Bruce Adamson, Dan Black, Julian Taylor, David Marshall, and Jeremy Elliott were all present. In conjunction with the concert, a tribute single entitled "Pull You Through" and written by Bennett's former band Titanic Love Affair was released to Canadian radio .

The band reunited to open for Blue Rodeo at the Nepean National Equestrian Park on August 21, 2010. Ben Spivak played keyboards.

The band also performed at the Horseshoe Tavern in Toronto on December 3, 2011, as part of the long-standing Christmas show: 'StagXmas Bash'.

Bruce Adamson died December 15, 2015, in Toronto.

Drummer Jeremy Elliott and Singer/Guitarist Julian Taylor now perform and record as part of the Julian Taylor Band, and have released two albums: Tech Noir in 2014, and the double album Desert Star on Aporia Records in 2016.

For one night only on April 20, 2020, the surviving members took the stage at Lees Palace as the support act for their friend and former label mate, J. Englishman to celebrate the 20th Anniversary celebration of his debut album.

== Members ==
Jeremy Elliott

Julian Taylor

- Julian Taylor, vocals and guitar
- Dan Black, bass guitar
- Jeremy Elliott, drums
- David E.G. Marshall, guitar (a founding member of the group, left in 1997 and returned in December 2001)
- Darrell O'Dea, keyboards, guitars and vocals (1997 to December 2001)
- Bruce Adamson, lead guitar (1997 to December 2001) (died 2015)

== Discography ==
=== Studio albums ===
- Mold (1997)
- 4-Song EP (2000)
- Staggered Crossing (2001)
- Last Summer When We Were Famous (2002)
- Burgundy & Blue (2004)

=== Music videos ===
- "Further Again" (2001)
- "A Million Works of Art" (2001)
- "Felony" (2002)
- "Business As Usual" (2003)

=== Singles ===
- "Further Again" (2001) - Top 10
- "Million Works of Art" (2001) - Top 40
- "Old Man" (2001)
- "Felony" (2002)
- "Business as Usual" (2003) - Top 100
- "Everyone Says" (2003)
- "Grow" (2004)
- "Perfect Prize" (2005) - Top 20
- "Don't Get Me Started" (2005) - Top 100
- "Pull You Through" (2009)
