= Little Jabs =

Studio album by Two Hours Traffic
- Released: July 24, 2007
- Recorded: The Sonic Temple, Halifax; Richmond Street Rehearsal Rm 108, Toronto
- Genre: Indie rock, power pop
- Label: Bumstead
- Producer: Joel Plaskett

Two Hours Traffic chronology
Two Hours Traffic (2005)	Little Jabs (2007)	Territory (2009)

Professional ratings
Review scores
Source	Rating
Americana UK	7/10 14 July 2007
Edmonton Journal	5/5 14 July 2007
Exclaim!	favourable Aug 2007
Fast Forward Weekly	favourable 26 July 2007
NOW	19 July 2007

Little Jabs is the second full-length studio album by Canadian indie rock band Two Hours Traffic, released on Bumstead Records on July 24, 2007. The album was produced by Joel Plaskett, and recorded in Halifax and Toronto.

Guitarist Alec O'Hanley explained the Little Jabs reference: "The title is meant to be about that point in a relationship where you’re more and more curt with one another... And in song, it’s meant to be little blasts—jabs—in these three-minute pop songs."

== Reception ==
The album received generally positive reviews from music critics. Iain Ilich of the Edmonton Journal wrote that it was the best album he has heard so far this year. Other critics have compared the band favorably to Joel Plaskett's own releases, and place the band in the tradition of great Canadian pop, citing the "catchy hooks". One critic correctly predicted in July 2007 that the album would be nominated for a Polaris Music Prize in 2008, and Eye Weekly named it one of the top 20 albums of 2007.

The album reached the top ten of Chart magazine's Canadian College Radio Top 50 Chart.

Little Jabs was named Alternative Rock Recording of the Year at the 2007 Music P.E.I. Awards, as Two Hours Traffic also received the award for Group of the Year. The album was nominated for Recording of the Year, Pop Recording of the Year, and Video of the Year ("Jezebel", directed by Ron Mann) at the 2008 East Coast Music Awards. It won Pop Recording of the Year.

The album was a nominee for the 2008 Polaris Music Prize.

== Promotion ==
The videos for "Stuck for the Summer" and "Jezebel" are receiving airplay on MuchMusic. Songs from the album have appeared in American television shows Gossip Girl, Smallville, Ghost Whisperer, Happy Endings, Castle, and The O.C.

== Track listing ==
All songs were written by Two Hours Traffic.

1. "Nighthawks"
2. "No Advances"
3. "Stuck for the Summer"
4. "Heroes of the Sidewalk"
5. "Jezebel"
6. "Backseat Sweetheart"
7. "Whenever We Finish"
8. "Stolen Earrings"
9. "Sure Can Start"
10. "Heatseeker"
11. "Arms Akimbo"

== Credits ==
- Two Hours Traffic:
  - Liam Corcoran – lead vocals, guitar
  - Alec O'Hanley – guitars, keys, vocals
  - Derek Ellis – drums
  - Andrew MacDonald – bass, vocals
- Guests:
  - Rose Cousins – vocals, chatter
  - Jenn Grant – vocals, chatter
  - Ian McGettigan – tambourine
  - Dale Murray – pedal steel
  - Joel Plaskett – guitars, vocals, tambourine
