= Mercy, the Sexton =

- Origin: St. John's, Newfoundland and Labrador, Canada
- Genres: Indie pop
- Years active: 2007–present
- Members: Luke Major; Duncan Major; Jon Hynes; Mat "Chewy" Lacombe; Jamie March
- Past members: Chris Johansen
- Website: mercythesexton.com

Mercy, the Sexton is a Canadian indie pop band from St. John's, Newfoundland. The band is now a five-piece, including the Major brothers, Hynes, Mat Lacombe, and Jamie March. They are known for the vocal harmonies.

== History ==
Mercy, the Sexton was founded by brothers Luke and Duncan Major in March 2007. The other band members initially were Chris Johansen and Jon Hynes.

In 2008, the band was filmed in Halifax by Joey Adrian as part of the 10 x 10 film project. Their debut album, Another Month, produced by Jody Richardson, was released in April that year. In December 2008, Another Month won the inaugural Atlantis Music Prize, a juried award based on the concept of the Polaris Music Prize, but given for album of the year in Newfoundland and Labrador. Other acts on the shortlist included Hey Rosetta! and Duane Andrews.

The band has toured Eastern Canada as opening act for bands such as Two Hours Traffic and Mardeen. They played at Pop Montreal in 2008, and Canadian Music Week in Toronto in 2009.

Their single "Yr Best" has been played in rotation on CBC Radio 3. Both Luke and Duncan Major were previously in the band The Nordic Beat.

== Discography ==
- 2008: Another Month
- 2010: Say It Back
