= The Scope =

The Scope may refer to:

- The Scope (alternative weekly), a newspaper published in St. John's, Newfoundland and Labrador, Canada
- CJRU, a campus radio station at Ryerson University in Toronto
- Norfolk Scope, a multi-function complex in Norfolk, Virginia
- The Scope, the blog of the Yale Scientific Magazine
