= Into Your Lungs =

Studio album by Hey Rosetta!
- Released: June 3, 2008
- Recorded: Sonic Temple, The Music Room; Halifax, Nova Scotia
- Genre: Indie rock
- Length: 60:22
- Label: Sonic Records
- Producer: Hawksley Workman

Hey Rosetta! chronology
Plan Your Escape (2006)	Into Your Lungs (2008)	Seeds (2011)

Professional ratings
Review scores
Source	Rating
Altsounds	link
ChartAttack	link

Into Your Lungs, also referred to as Into Your Lungs (and around in your heart, and on through your blood), is the second studio album by Canadian rock band Hey Rosetta!, released on June 3, 2008. It was produced by Hawksley Workman.

The record won Album of the Year at the inaugural Verge Music Awards and ChartAttack.com Favourite Album at the annual Indie Awards during 2009's Canadian Music Week. The album was nominated for the 2008 Atlantis Music Prize and was shortlisted for the 2009 Polaris Music Prize.

== Track listing ==
All tracks are written by All songs written by Tim Baker, except where noted.

No.	Title	Length
1.	"New Goodbye"	5:32
2.	"I've Been Asleep for a Long, Long Time"	5:46
3.	"There's an Arc"	5:02
4.	"Handshake the Gangster"	6:10
5.	"Open Arms" (Baker, Adam Hogan)	4:58
6.	"Black Heart"	4:58
7.	"Red Heart"	4:40
8.	"We Made a Pact" (guest vocals by Jenn Grant)	3:46
9.	"Tired Eyes"	5:49
10.	"Holy Shit (What a Relief)"	5:44
11.	"A Thousand Suns"	4:44
12.	"Psalm"	3:11
