= Kintsukuroi (disambiguation) =

Kintsukuroi, or kintsugi, is the Japanese art of repairing broken pottery with lacquer dusted or mixed with powdered gold, silver, or platinum.

Kintsukuroi may also refer to:

- "Kintsukuroi", a song by Hey Rosetta! from Second Sight
- "Kintsukuroi (Golden Repair)", an orchestral work by Grace-Evangeline Mason
