= I Need to Start a Garden =

Studio album by Haley Heynderickx
- Released: March 9, 2018
- Studios: Nomah Studios, Portland, Oregon
- Genre: Indie folk
- Length: 30:56
- Label: Mama Bird Recording Co.
- Producer: Zak Kimball

Haley Heynderickx chronology
I Need to Start a Garden (2018)	Seed of a Seed (2024)

Professional ratings
Aggregate scores
Source	Rating
AnyDecentMusic?	(7.6/10)
Metacritic	80/100
Review scores
Source	Rating
AllMusic	4/5 stars
DIY	4/5 stars
Exclaim!	8/10
MusicOMH	4/5 stars
Pitchfork	7.3/10
PopMatters	7/10
The Skinny	4/5 stars

I Need to Start a Garden is the debut studio album by American musician Haley Heynderickx. It was released in March 2018 under Mama Bird Recording Company.

== Production ==
In an interview, Haley Heynderickx explained it took three attempts to record the album. Her first attempt was at Pendarvis Farm in Happy Valley, Oregon, with musician Colyn Cameron. However, a horse had died during one of her songs. She explained, "I lost faith in the songs and myself. The horse died". The second was at a conventional studio, but Heynderickx felt inhibited by insecurity and worries about money from the cost of the studio: "It doesn't feel like a labour of love when every moment you're in a studio it feels like you're losing money. The last thing I want to think about when capturing songs that were made from a place of love, is money." Her third attempt was made at Nomah Studios – an in-house licensing studio set up by Heynderickx's friends.

== Music video ==
On May 2, 2018, the music video of "No Face" was released. In a statement, Heynderickx explained the song was inspired by the 2001 Japanese animated movie Spirited Away. The video was directed by Evan James Atwood.

== Critical reception ==
I Need to Start a Garden was met with "generally favorable" reviews from critics. At Metacritic, which assigns a weighted average rating out of 100 to reviews from mainstream publications, this release received an average score of 80 based on 10 reviews. Aggregator Album of the Year gave the release an 80 out of 100 based on a critical consensus of 9 reviews.

Marcy Donelson of AllMusic said: "With eight tracks and a playing time of 30 minutes, it's an efficient debut without a weak song in the bunch, one noteworthy for its poise as well as its engaging eccentricity."

=== Accolades ===
Accolades for I Need to Start a Garden
Publication	Accolade	Rank
Digital Trends	Digital Trends' Top 50 Albums of 2018	17
Exclaim!	Exclaim!'s Top 10 Folk and Country Albums of 2018	4
God Is in the TV	God Is in the TV's Top 100 Albums of 2018	22
Loud and Quiet	Loud and Quiet's Top 40 Albums of 2018	27
Paste	Paste's Top 50 Albums of 2018	30
Paste	Paste's Top 20 Albums of 2018 – Mid-Year	7
PopMatters	PopMatters's Top 20 Albums of 2018	8
Sputnikmusic	Sputnikmusic's Top 100 Albums of the Decade (2010s)	56
The Wild Honey Pie	The Wild Honey Pie's Top 30 Albums of 2018	10
Uproxx	Uproxx's Top 50 Albums of 2018	25

== Track listing ==
All tracks are written by Haley Heynderickx.

No.	Title	Length
1.	"No Face"	1:56
2.	"The Bug Collector"	3:48
3.	"Jo"	3:52
4.	"Worth It"	7:53
5.	"Show You a Body"	3:29
6.	"Untitled God Song"	3:44
7.	"Oom Sha La La"	2:57
8.	"Drinking Song"	3:16

== Personnel ==
- Haley Heynderickx – vocals, co-production
- Zak Kimball – production, engineering, mixing
- Timothy Stollenwerk – mastering
- Adam Gonsalves – vinyl cut
- Alessandra Leimer – cover photo
- Vincent Bancheri – design
