= Territory (Two Hours Traffic album) =

Studio album by Two Hours Traffic
- Released: September 8, 2009
- Genres: Indie rock, power pop
- Label: Bumstead
- Producer: Joel Plaskett

Two Hours Traffic chronology
Little Jabs (2007)	Territory (2009)

Territory is the third full-length studio album by Canadian indie rock band Two Hours Traffic, and the follow-up to their Polaris Prize-nominated Little Jabs. It was released on September 8, 2009 on Bumstead Records. The album was produced by Joel Plaskett. The band toured Canada in September and October 2009 in support of the album.

== Reception ==
Writing for The Georgia Straight, Adrian Mack called the album a "gorgeous and defiantly old-fashioned album". Writing for PopMatters, Zachary Houle called the album "a little half-baked", but provided an indifferent recommendation.

Writing for AllMusic, Ned Raggett gave the album 3.5 stars out of five.

== Track listing ==
1. "Noisemaker"
2. "Wicked Side"
3. "Territory"
4. "Weightless One"
5. "Painted Halo"
6. "Just Listen"
7. "Drop Alcohol"
8. "Monster Closet"
9. "Lost Boys"
10. "Happiness Burns"
11. "Sing a Little Hymn"
12. "Night's Too Short" (bonus track)

== Personnel ==
- Two Hours Traffic:
  - Liam Corcoran – lead vocals, guitar
  - Alec O'Hanley – guitars, keys, vocals
  - Derek Ellis – drums
  - Andrew MacDonald – bass, vocals
- Guests:
  - Joel Plaskett – guitars
  - Anna Plaskett – French horn
  - Molly Rankin – vocals
- Production
  - Joel Plaskett - producer
  - Howard Redekopp - mixer
