= Gramercy Riffs =

Canadian indie rock band

- Origin: St. John's, Newfoundland, Canada
- Genres: Indie
- Years active: 2008–present
- Label: Unsigned
- Members: Daniel Banoub; Lee Hanlon; Brad Kilpatrick; Mara Pellerin; Jimmy Rose
- Past members: James March; Adrian Collins

The Gramercy Riffs is a Canadian indie rock band formed in St. John's in 2008. The band is in rotation on CBC Radio. The band was the recipient of the 2010 Atlantis Music Prize for their debut LP It's Heartbreak. The album also received a positive review from Exclaim!.

== History ==
=== Origin ===
The Gramercy Riffs formed in 2008 in St. John's, Newfoundland and Labrador, Canada. The band took their name from the 1979 film The Warriors. As of late 2009, the band has relocated to Toronto.

=== It's Heartbreak ===
The band's debut LP It's Heartbreak was self-released 21 May 2010. The album earned the band a 2010 Atlantis Music Prize. The album also received a favourable review from Exclaim! magazine.

== Band members ==
- Lee Hanlon – vocals, guitar (2008–present)
- Mara Pellerin – vocals, keyboard (2008–present)
- Daniel Banoub – bass guitar (2008–present)
- Jimmy Rose – guitar (2009–present)
- Brad Kilpatrick – drums (2010–present)
- Adrian Collins – guitar (2008–2010)
- James March – drums (2008–2010)

== Discography ==
=== Albums ===
- 2010 It's Heartbreak
- 2014 Desire Trails

==== Track listing ====
It's Heartbreak
No.	Title	Length
1.	"Oh Linda!"	3:22
2.	"Silent Walls and Siren Calls"	4:20
3.	"Hold My Hand"	3:45
4.	"Little One"	4:13
5.	"Ambulance"	3:33
6.	"The Freezedown"	4:15
7.	"Dreaming"	3:44
8.	"Tonight's Your Night"	3:34
9.	"Call Me"	3:20
10.	"Come Home Darlin'"	4:53
11.	"Seventeen"	5:32
Total length:		44:31

== See also ==
- List of bands from Canada
