= Haley Heynderickx =

American singer-songwriter

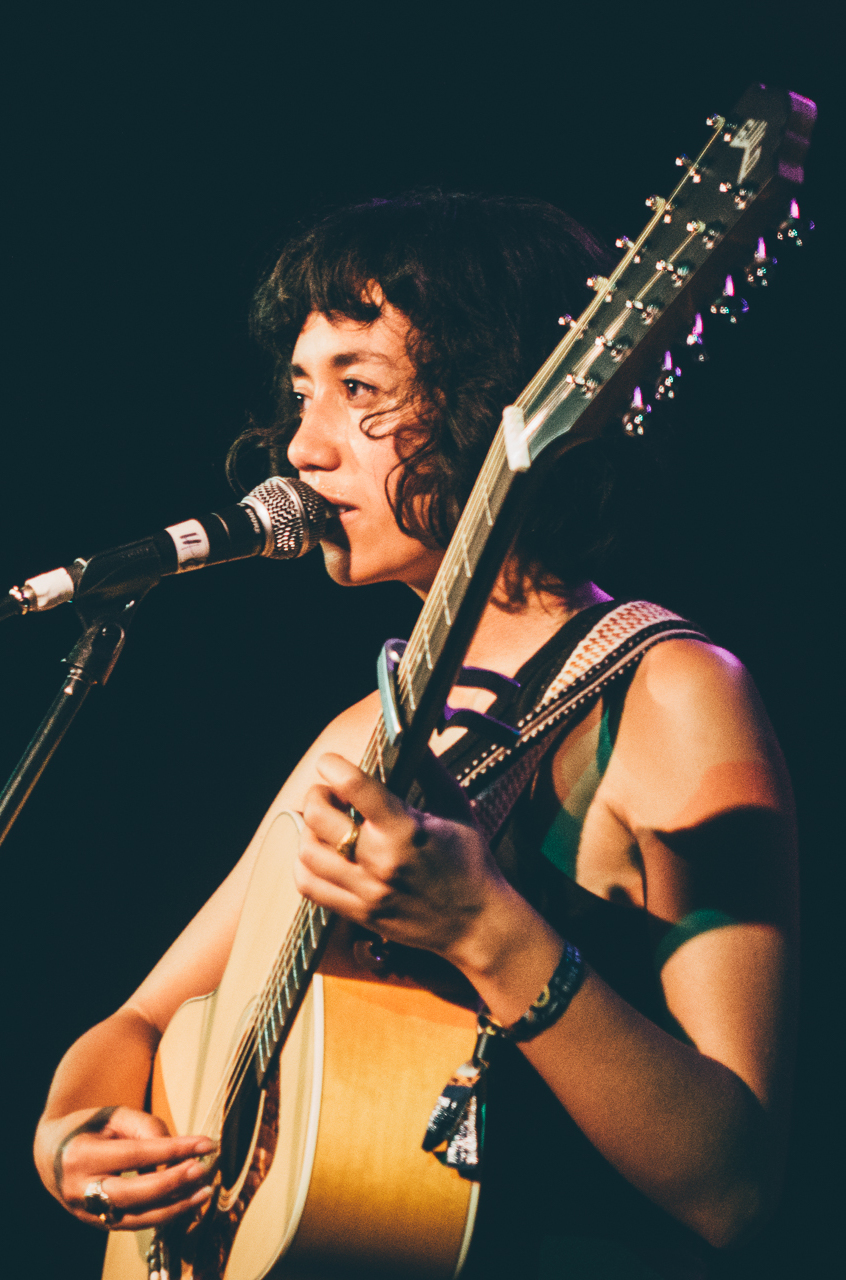
- Heynderickx in August 2018

Background information
- Born: Haley Hannah Heynderickx; May 28, 1993 (age 33); Stockton, California, U.S.
- Origin: Portland, Oregon, U.S.
- Education: Portland State University (BA)
- Genre: Indie folk
- Occupations: Musician; singer; songwriter
- Instruments: Vocals; guitar
- Years active: 2015–present
- Label: Mama Bird Recording Co.
- Website: www.haley-heynderickx.com

Haley Hannah Heynderickx (born May 28, 1993) is an American singer-songwriter from Portland, Oregon. In 2016, she released her debut EP, Fish Eyes. Her first full-length album, I Need to Start a Garden, was released in March 2018 on Mama Bird Recording Co. Seed of a Seed, her second album, was released in November 2024 on the same label.

== Early life ==
Heynderickx was born on May 28, 1993, in Stockton, California. Her mother was born in the Philippines. She grew up in Forest Grove, Oregon, a suburb of Portland, where she learned to sing in church. She graduated from Portland State University with a business degree.

== Career ==
She released her debut EP, Fish Eyes, in January 2016. That same year, she and Max Garcia Conover released a collaborative EP titled Among Horses III.

In March 2018, she released her first album, I Need to Start a Garden, on Mama Bird Recording Co. The album received positive reviews, including a 7.3 rating from Pitchfork, while NPR Music wrote that the album "captivates" and Uproxx called it "an utterly brilliant folk debut". In January 2018, she was named an "Artist to Watch" by Stereogum. In August of that same year, Heynderickx performed an NPR tiny desk concert featuring songs from I Need to Start a Garden.

In 2023 she was an opening act for Tim Baker for several shows in his Canadian tour. She released her second studio album, Seed of a Seed, on November 1, 2024. The album received generally positive reviews from Pitchfork, Paste, and DIY, among others.

In November 2025, Heynderickx and Max Garcia Conover released a collaborative LP, What of Our Nature, through Fat Possum Records. In a review of the album, Pitchfork called What of Our Nature a "spirited and serious collection of protest folk inspired by the legacy of Woody Guthrie."

== Style ==
Heynderickx's music features a fingerstyle acoustic guitar technique inspired by Leo Kottke and John Fahey paired with introspective lyrics punctuated with "well-timed levity".

== Discography ==
Albums

- I Need to Start a Garden (2018)
- Seed of a Seed (2024)

Collaborative albums

- Among Horses III (with Max García Conover) (2018)
- What of Our Nature (with Max García Conover) (2025)

EPs

- Fish Eyes (2016)
- Unpeeled (Banana Stand) (2017)
