= Darrell O'Dea =

Background information
- Origin: Toronto
- Genres: Pop, Rock, Folk, Film and Advertising Music
- Occupation(s): Composer, Musician, Audio Engineer, Producer (Music, Radio)
- Instrument(s): Guitar, Piano, Organ, Bass, Drums
- Years active: 1992–present
- Labels: Warner Music Canada (formerly)

Darrell O'Dea is a Canadian musician and recording engineer. He has been a member of the backing band for Lost and Profound since 1999. He was a member of Staggered Crossing (1997–2002), Renann (1997–2000), Andy Stochansky (2002) and BOY (2003). He has appeared on numerous recordings as a guest musician and has recorded or produced artists including Collective Soul, Kyp Harness, Kiran Ahluwalia, Hayden, The Waltons, Adam Faux, The Supers (Fall Down Go Boom), Rebecca Campbell, Martin Posen, and Pinchas Zukerman.
