= The Scope (alternative weekly) =

Canadian newspaper in Newfoundland and Labrador

- Type: Alternative weekly
- Format: Tabloid
- Owner: Scope Media Inc.
- Publisher: Bryhanna Greenough
- Editor: Elling Lien
- Founded: 2006
- Ceased publication: 2013
- Language: English
- Headquarters: Box 1044; St. John's, Newfoundland and Labrador, Canada. A1C 5M3
- Circulation: 23,000
- Price: Free
- Website: thescope.ca

The Scope was a free English language alternative newsweekly based in St. John's, Newfoundland and Labrador, Canada.

First published on July 6, 2006, the newspaper started as a weekly publication, printing 6,000 copies. In fall of 2006 they moved to a bi-weekly print schedule, and remained that way until 2010. As of June 2010, The Scope switched to a monthly print schedule to reduce printing and distribution costs, and to focus on online-only content. In November 2013 they announced that the last edition would be in December 2013, ending publication after 7 years.

Each month 23,000 copies were distributed across the St. John's metropolitan area (including Torbay, Mount Pearl, CBS, Paradise, and Portugal Cove-St. Philips).

In 2008 The Scope established the Atlantis Music Prize a music award annually given to the best full-length album from Newfoundland and Labrador, Canada, based only on artistic merit, regardless of genre, sales, or record label. Previous winners include percussionist Curtis Andrews and indie pop group Mercy, The Sexton.

== See also ==
- The Overcast
- List of newspapers in Canada
