= Seeds (Hey Rosetta! album) =

Studio album by Hey Rosetta!
- Released: February 15, 2011
- Genre: Indie rock
- Length: 49:22
- Label: Sonic Records
- Producer: Tony Doogan

Hey Rosetta! chronology
| Into Your Lungs (2008) | Seeds (2011) | Second Sight (2014) |

Singles from Seeds
- 1. "Welcome"; 2. "Yer Spring"; 3. "Seeds"

Seeds is the third studio album by Canadian indie rock band Hey Rosetta! It was released on February 15, 2011, through Sonic Records and was produced by Tony Doogan.

Lead singer Tim Baker stated in an interview that the album name, as well as the title track, is about "...the idea ...that we are seeds, travelling from town to town, blowing around, settling down here and there, trying to make something for people", and that "the songs are seeds...they're these little things — four and five minute things — but they have the ability to grow in your brain and be far more meaningful than just what they are".

== Reception ==
Seeds received generally favourable reviews. Kate Harper of CHARTattack noted that the album "...succeeds in ways Lungs—though a good album—did not ... there's definitely more of a robust feel throughout all of Seeds." Richard Trapunski of Now Magazine gave a more mixed review: "Aiming for the same puffed-up collective catharsis as Arcade Fire, Tim Baker and co. layer strings, horns, mandolins and anything else they can get their hands on to inflate the songs into anthems."

On June 16, the album was named as one of 40 longlisted nominees for the 2011 Polaris Music Prize.

Professional ratings
Review scores
| Source | Rating |
|---|---|
| CHARTAttack | 4.5/5 stars |
| Consequence of Sound | link |
| Now Magazine | 3/5 stars |
| Sticky Magazine | 5/5 stars |
| Allmusic | 3/5 stars |

== Track listing ==
| No. | Title | Writer(s) | Length |
|---|---|---|---|
| 1. | "Seeds" | Tim Baker, Adam Hogan | 4:27 |
| 2. | "Yer Spring" | Baker | 4:52 |
| 3. | "Young Glass" | Baker, Hogan | 5:36 |
| 4. | "Bricks" | Baker | 4:18 |
| 5. | "New Sum (Nous Sommes)" | Baker | 4:27 |
| 6. | "Downstairs" | Baker, Hogan | 1:58 |
| 7. | "Welcome" | Baker | 4:02 |
| 8. | "Seventeen" | Baker | 3:48 |
| 9. | "Yer Fall" | Baker | 5:39 |
| 10. | "Parson Brown (Upirngaangutuq Iqalunni)" | Baker | 5:13 |
| 11. | "Bandages" | Baker | 5:02 |
| Total length: | | | 49:22 |

U.S. version bonus tracks
| No. | Title | Writer(s) | Length |
|---|---|---|---|
| 12. | "Young Glass" (Acoustic Version) | Baker, Hogan | 6:05 |
| 13. | "Welcome" (Acoustic Version) | Baker | 3:51 |
| 14. | "Seventeen" (Acoustic Version) | Baker | 4:16 |
| Total length: | | | 63:34 |

== Release history ==
| Country | Date | Label |
|---|---|---|
| Canada | February 15, 2011 | Sonic Records |
| United States | March 8, 2012 | ATO Records |
