= Second Sight (Hey Rosetta! album) =

Studio album by Hey Rosetta!
- Released: October 21, 2014
- Recorded: MixArt Studios, Montreal
- Genres: Rock; alternative; pop; folk
- Length: 56:48
- Label: Sonic Records
- Producer: Marcus Paquin

Hey Rosetta! chronology
Seeds (2011)	Second Sight (2014)

Second Sight is the fourth studio album by the Canadian rock band Hey Rosetta!, released by Sonic Records on October 21, 2014.

It debuted at number six on the Canadian Albums Chart, selling 4,600 copies. It went on to win the 2015 Borealis Music Prize.

== Track listing ==
No.	Title	Writer(s)	Length
1.	"Soft Offering (For the Oft Suffering)"	Tim Baker	3:58
2.	"Gold Teeth"	Tim Baker	4:27
3.	"Dream"	Tim Baker	3:45
4.	"What Arrows"	Tim Baker	6:45
5.	"Promise"	Tim Baker	5:07
6.	"Kid Gloves"	Tim Baker	4:10
7.	"Neon Beyond"	Tim Baker	5:19
8.	"Kintsukuroi"	Tim Baker, Adam Hogan	3:31
9.	"Cathedral Bells"	Tim Baker	4:45
10.	"Alcatraz"	Tim Baker	6:02
11.	"Harriet"	Tim Baker	5:13
12.	"Trish's Song"	Tim Baker	3:46
Total length:			56:48
