= Kim Hughes (broadcaster) =

Kim Hughes is a Canadian radio personality and arts and entertainment journalist, who most recently hosted programming on XM Satellite Radio's The Verge.

Hughes was most widely known for her work at 102.1 The Edge (CFNY-FM) in Toronto, Ontario, as host of the nightly live music magazine Live in Toronto from 1992 to 1999. Canadian Musician described her as "one of the best-known music radio personalities in Canada", and the Toronto Star referred to her as "one of the Toronto pop-music industry's most respected and influential figures". She was seen in the industry as an unusually intelligent interviewer, and was credited for introducing to wider audiences bands that did not neatly fit into her radio station's format. After the station's move to new studios at the Eaton Centre in 1996, she interviewed bands and had them perform in a glass-enclosed studio at street level, where fans could watch.

She served as freelance music reviewer for CBC Newsworld's On the Arts, alongside novelist David Gilmour. Concurrent with her work as radio host, Hughes was music editor at Toronto-based alternative news weekly Now. In 1999 she continued in her role at NOW Magazine, but was replaced by George Stroumboulopoulos at 102.1 The Edge.

Her work has been widely published, appearing in the Toronto Star, The Globe and Mail, Billboard, Salon, the National Post, Utne Reader and others. In 2001, Hughes was recruited by Seattle online merchant Amazon.com to oversee the launch of its Canadian arm, Amazon.ca. Hughes now works as Amazon.ca's music content editor and continues to write reviews of books and music for Amazon.com and Amazon.ca, as well as the Star, Report on Business Magazine and others. She joined The Verge in 2005. Additionally, Hughes also served as editor-in-chief overseeing content for online dating giant Lavalife.com and their publication, Click.Lavalife.com. For several years, Hughes maintained two blogs (film and music) for Sympatico.ca as well as writing freelance for myriad digital and print publications. Hughes currently freelances for multiple print and digital clients including The Grid, Elevate Magazine, Massey Hall/Roy Thomson Hall (where she also voices podcasts), MSN, online magazine Samaritan and others while retaining links to the music industry via artist bios.
