= Isolator (EP) =

EP by Two Hours Traffic
- Released: September 26, 2006
- Genre: Indie rock, power pop
- Producer: Joel Plaskett

Two Hours Traffic chronology
| Two Hours Traffic (2005) | Isolator (2006) |

Isolator is the 2006 follow-up to the self-titled debut album by Two Hours Traffic, a Canadian indie rock, power pop band from Charlottetown, Prince Edward Island. It was nominated for Alternative Recording of the Year at the 2007 East Coast Music Awards. The song "Purple Eyes / Yellow Light" was used in an episode of Degrassi: The Next Generation. "Jezebel" and "Stuck for the Summer" were used in the first season of Gossip Girl. "Jezebel" was also used in Castle season 1 episode 3.

== Track listing ==
All songs were written by Two Hours Traffic.

1. "Purple Eyes / Yellow Light"
2. "Stuck for the Summer"
3. "Jezebel"
4. "Heatseeker"
5. "New Love"
6. "Close up to Me"
