= Kinley (name) =

Kinley is a given name and a surname.

== Given name ==
- Kinley Dorji, Bhutanese journalist and politician
- Kinley Dorji (footballer), Bhutanese footballer
- Kinley Dowling, Canadian musician
- Kinley Gibson, Canadian road bicycle racer
- Kinley McNicoll, Canadian soccer player
- Kinley Wangchuk (footballer), Bhutanese footballer
- Kinley Wangchuk (politician), Bhutanese politician

== Surname ==
- Tyler Kinley, American baseball player
- Thomas D. Kinley, U.S. Army major general
- David Kinley, Scotland-born economist
- Monika Kinley, British art dealer, collector and curator
- Ed Kinley, Canadian politician
