= The Overcast =

Monthly arts and culture newspaper in Canada

The Overcast is a monthly newspaper that covers arts and culture in St. John's, Newfoundland and Labrador. The paper began publishing in February 2014, founded by St. John's author and blogger Chad Pelley.

The Overcast covers local artists and entrepreneurs, food, retail, and academic culture. In addition to its monthly print issue, its website is home to an online alternative radio station (Overcast Radio), event listings, restaurant listings and reviews, and other resources, including its own YouTube channel of Overcast-exclusive web videos. The Overcast also produces two podcasts, None the Wiser and The Overcast Fiction Podcast.

The Overcast administers and funds the Borealis Music Prize for the best Newfoundland & Labrador album of the year, and The Albedo Grant, an annual $10,000 grant meant to help someone "kickstart their dreamjob or take their career to new heights".

The paper was intended by Pelley to be replacement for The Scope, a St. John's-based alternative weekly that ceased publication after seven years, in December 2013.
