= Seed of a Seed =

Studio album by Haley Heynderickx
- Released: November 1, 2024
- Length: 35:19
- Label: Mama Bird
- Producer: Daniel Ross; Denzel Mendoza; Matthew Holmes; William Seiji Marsh; Caleigh Drane

Haley Heynderickx chronology
Among Horses III (2018)	Seed of a Seed (2024)

Singles from Seed of a Seed
- 1. "Seed of a Seed" Released: July 30, 2024; 2. "Foxglove" Released: September 18, 2024

Seed of a Seed is the second studio album by American singer-songwriter Haley Heynderickx. It was released on November 1, 2024, through Mama Bird Recording Co.

== Background ==
In July 2024, the first single from the album and the title track, "Seed of a Seed", was released. It was Heynderickx's first release in six years. On September 18, 2024, the album was announced by Heynderickx, and the release of the second single "Foxglove" followed, together with a music video.

== Reception ==
Professional ratings
Review scores
Source	Rating
Pitchfork	7.6/10 stars
Under the Radar	7.5/10 stars
DIY Magazine	4/5 stars
Paste Magazine	8.4/10 stars
AllMusic	4/5 stars

Pitchfork referred to Seed of a Seed as an exploration of Heynderickx's "internal anxieties and the wisdom that can be gleaned outside the confines of our minds," giving it a rating of 7.6 from 10. Under the Radar described the album as "a lushly, gorgeous sophomore album from an artist that has become comfortable and accomplished at her work," and rated it 7.5 out of 10.

Hazel Blacher of DIY Magazine reviewed the album, stating "As perhaps one of the most refreshing voices in indie folk, Seed Of A Seed sees Haley Heynderickx harnessing a uniquely spellbinding and sensitive power," giving it four out of five stars. Paste Magazine's Ellen Johnson rated Seed of a Seed 8.4 out of 10, calling it "marvelous" and stating it "embraces both the ugliness and beauty of her own storyline" and is about "being in touch with ourselves, and nature, is key to a healthier inner life."

AllMusic gave it four stars out of five, describing it as having similar characteristics with Heynderickx's debut album, I Need to Start a Garden, such as "alternate tunings and complex chords, a brittle, lilting singing style, and slightly off-kilter arrangements that are mostly acoustic but include some electric guitar and electric bass as well as the occasional trombone" with "a tenser, more cautionary tone to the album, despite some affectionate passages."

== Track listing ==
No.	Title	Length
1.	"Gemini"	4:31
2.	"Foxglove"	2:40
3.	"Seed of a Seed"	2:44
4.	"Mouth of a Flower"	4:17
5.	"Spit in the Sink"	2:23
6.	"Redwoods (Anxious God)"	4:42
7.	"Ayan's Song"	3:17
8.	"Sorry Fahey"	3:41
9.	"Jerry's Song"	3:15
10.	"Swoop"	3:49
Total length:		35:19
