= Burgundy & Blue =

Studio album by Staggered Crossing
- Released: 2004
- Genre: Rock; Alternative rock
- Length: 50:11
- Label: Bent Penny Records
- Producer: Ed Zych, Staggered Crossing

Staggered Crossing chronology
Last Summer When We Were Famous (2002)	Burgundy & Blue (2004)

Singles from Burgundy & Blue
- 1. "Grow" Released: 2004; 2. "Perfect Prize" Released: 2005; 3. "Don't Get Me Started" Released: 2005

Professional ratings
Review scores
Source	Rating
Allmusic	(not rated) link
The Coast	(not rated) link

Burgundy & Blue is an album by Staggered Crossing, released in 2004. It was produced by Ed Zych and was the band's first recording on Bent Penny Records. "Perfect Prize" was released as a single and peaked at #17 on Canada's Rock chart.

== Track listing ==
1. "Burgundy & Blue
2. "Grow
3. "My Disease
4. "Trail of Broken Hearts
5. "Letters to a Young Girl
6. "Don't Get Me Started
7. "When The Rain's All Gone
8. "Under Circumstances Like These
9. "Perfect Prize
10. "Nuclear Winter (Next 2 You)
11. "In The Trees at Night
12. "Save Me Tonight
