= Yukon Blonde =

Canadian indie rock band

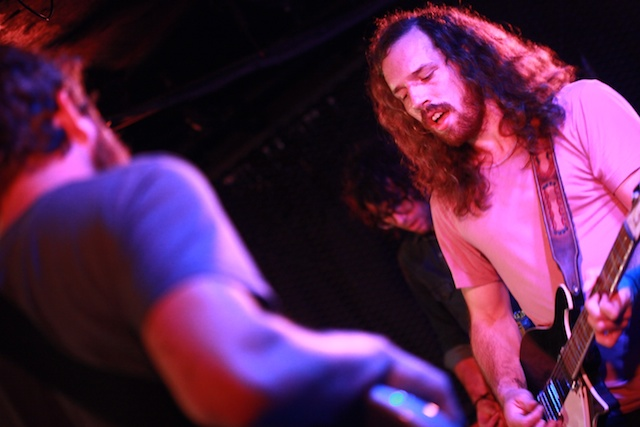
- Yukon Blonde playing at Vancouver's Biltmore Cabaret in 2010

Background information
- Origin: Kelowna, British Columbia, Canada
- Genre: Indie rock
- Years active: 2005–present
- Labels: Dine Alone; Bumstead; Nevado
- Members: Jeff Innes; Brandon Scott; Graham Jones; James Younger
- Past members: Adam Newton; John Jeffrey; Rebecca Gray
- Website: yukonblonde.com

Yukon Blonde is a Canadian indie rock band originally from Kelowna, British Columbia. The band has been based in Vancouver since 2009.

Yukon Blonde's debut EP was Everything in Everyway. Their debut self-titled album, which was recorded live-to-tape, came out in 2010. For both, they worked with record producer Shawn Cole, who has previously worked with such bands as Bend Sinister and You Say Party! We Say Die!. The band has toured the US and Canada, and played at such festivals as South by Southwest. The band was named one of the "10 Canadian bands destined to break in 2010" by the CBC, and Chart called the band the best of the 2010 Canadian Music Week festival.

The album Tiger Talk was released in 2012. The band was nominated for the Juno Award for Breakthrough Group of the Year in 2013.

On March 17, 2015, the band released the first taste of new material with the single "Saturday Night" which premiered through Paste Magazine.

In October 2015, the band collaborated with Hey Rosetta! on the non-album single "Land You Love", a protest song about the 2015 federal election.

== Members ==
- Jeff Innes – vocals, guitar, chief songwriter
- Brandon Scott – guitar, vocals
- Graham Jones – drums, vocals
- James Younger – bass, vocals

Former members

- Adam Newton – bass
- John Jeffrey – bass
- Rebecca Gray – Keyboard, synth, vocals

== Discography ==
=== Albums ===
As Alphababy

- 2006: You Gentle Crustacean (EP)
- 2008: Alphababy Live (EP)

As Yukon Blonde

- Everything in Everyway (EP) – October 5, 2009
- Yukon Blonde – February 9, 2010
- Fire//Water (EP) – September 20, 2011
- Tiger Talk – March 20, 2012, No. 82 CAN
- On Blonde – June 16, 2015
- Critical Hit – June 22, 2018
- Vindicator – November 13, 2020
- Shuggie - October 12, 2023
- Friendship & Rock 'N' Roll - September 19, 2025

=== Singles ===
| Year | Song | Chart peak | | Album |
| Year | Song | CAN Alt | CAN Rock | Album |
|---|---|---|---|---|
| 2011 | "Babies Don't Like Blue Anymore" | 45 | — | Yukon Blonde |
| 2012 | "Stairway" | 12 | 32 | Tiger Talk |
| 2012 | "My Girl" | 30 | — | Tiger Talk |
| 2013 | "Six Dead Tigers" | 30 | — | Tiger Talk |
| 2015 | "Saturday Night" | 11 | — | On Blonde |
"—" denotes a release that did not chart.
