= Last Summer When We Were Famous =

Studio album by Staggered Crossing
- Released: August 2002
- Genre: Rock; Alternative rock
- Label: Outside Music
- Producer: Jay Bennett

Staggered Crossing chronology
Staggered Crossing (2000)	Last Summer When We Were Famous (2002)	Burgundy & Blue (2004)

Singles from Last Summer When We Were Famous
- 1. "Felony" Released: 2002; 2. "Business as Usual" Released: 2003; 3. "Everyone Says" Released: 2003

Last Summer When We Were Famous is an album by Staggered Crossing, released in 2002.

== Track listing ==
1. "Losing's Alright"
2. "Felony"
3. "Everyone Says"
4. "Photograph"
5. "Business as Usual"
6. "Heart Attack (That's a Drag)"
7. "Confessions"
8. "Obvious Way to My Heart"
9. "What You Were Yesterday"
10. "What I Said"
11. "Felony" (Bonus Track - Alternate Version)
