= Kinley Dowling =

Canadian musician (born 1983)

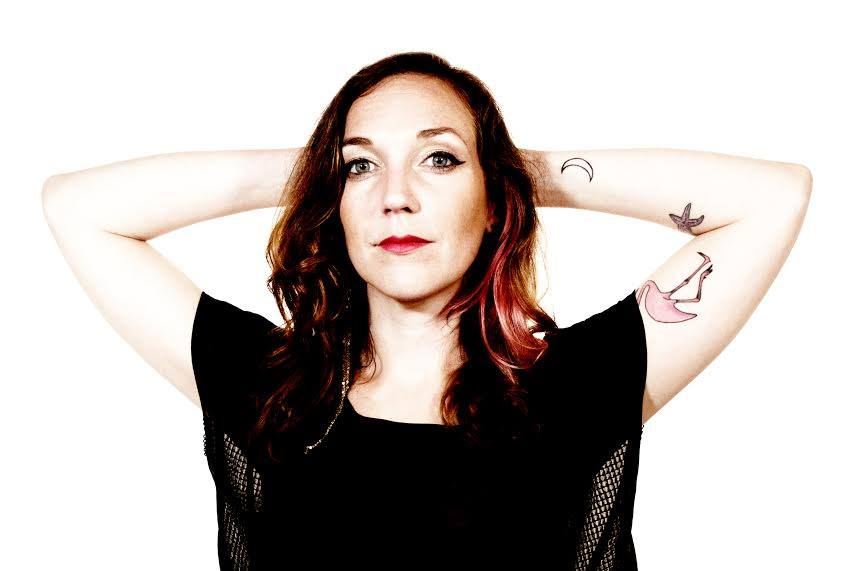
- Dowling at the Echo Lake recording studio in Nova Scotia

Background information
- Also known as: KINLEY
- Born: Kinley Margaret Dowling; January 18, 1983 (age 43); Charlottetown, Prince Edward Island, Canada
- Genre: Dance-pop
- Occupations: Singer-songwriter, musician
- Instruments: Vocals, violin
- Years active: 2007–present
- Member of: Hey Rosetta!
- Website: www.kinleymusic.com

Kinley Dowling (born January 18, 1983), who performs under the stage name KINLEY, is a Canadian singer-songwriter and musician. She is a member of the band Hey Rosetta! and joined them in 2008. In 2016, she released her solo album Letters Never Sent. In 2018, she was nominated for four East Coast Music Awards, where she won Fan Choice Video of the Year (for her single "Microphone") and Rising Star Recording of the Year. She released her second album KINLEY in 2020, where it was nominated for Pop Recording of the Year at the 2021 East Coast Music Awards.

== Career ==
Dowling was born in Charlottetown, Prince Edward Island, Canada. Her recording career began when she was a music student at Dalhousie University. Dowling is based in Charlottetown.

=== Hey Rosetta! ===
The day after she graduated from Dalhousie University in 2007, Dowling began playing violin with the rock group Hey Rosetta!. She toured with the band, based in St. John's, Newfoundland and Labrador, for ten years, until they went on indefinite hiatus, in 2017.

=== Collaborations ===
In July 2011, Liam Corcoran and Dowling released their self-titled duo album The Express. This album, consisting of 11 songs, was produced by Dale Murray. The first three original compositions were written by Dowling and the remaining tracks were written by Liam Corcoran.

In June 2017, Dennis Ellsworth and Dowling released the duet album Everyone Needs to Chill Out. This album features songs written individually by Ellsworth and Dowling, as well as songs written together. Everyone Needs To Chill Out was nominated for six awards at the 2018 Music PEI Awards, and won the New Artist of the Year Award.

=== Solo career ===
Dowling released her debut solo album Letters Never Sent in October 2016. In 2017, the debut album won the "Female Solo Recording of the Year", "New Artist of the Year" and "SOCAN Songwriter of the Year" awards at Music PEI Week.

At the East Coast Music Awards in 2018, Letters Never Sent won the "Rising Artist of the Year" and "Fans' Choice Video of the Year" for "Microphone". "Microphone" received attention for its coverage of sexual assault and the song was incorporated into Grade 9 Health classes in PEI to help students understand consent.

Her second album, KINLEY, was released in 2020 and was preceded by the singles "Lightworkers", "Run With You", and "Washington". It was nominated for Pop Recording of the Year at the 2021 East Coast Music Awards, losing to Sorrey's In Full Bloom.

== Personal life ==
Dowling is a first cousin of musician Liam Corcoran. The former front man for Two Hours Traffic encouraged Dowling to write her own original music.

== Discography ==
=== Solo albums ===
- Letters Never Sent (2016)
- KINLEY (2020)

=== Solo singles ===
- "Microphone" (2018)
- "Lightworkers" (2019)
- "Run With You" (2019)
- "Washington" (2020)

=== Notable collaborations ===
- The Express by The Express (Liam Corcoran, Kinley Dowling, Dale Murray) (2011 album)
- Everyone Needs to Chill Out by Dennis Ellsworth and Kinley Dowling (Pyramid Scheme, 2017)

=== Other collaborations ===
Dowling has recorded on over 50 albums. This is a partial list of other albums that she has played on.

- The Send Off (2009) - Rose Cousins
- Echoes (2009) - Jenn Grant
- We Are an Empire, My Dear (2009) - In-Flight Safety
- Self Explanatory (Classified album) (2009) - Classified (rapper)
- Honeymoon Punch (2011) - Jenn Grant
- 20 Odd Years (2011) - Buck 65
- Coyote (Matt Mays album) (2012) - Matt Mays
- The Beautiful Wild (2012) - Jenn Grant
- Hazy Sunshine (2013) - Dennis Ellsworth
- Compostela (album) (2014) - Jenn Grant
- The Bliss (2015) - Fortunate Ones
