= Idlers (Canadian band) =

idlers
- Origin: St. John's, Newfoundland and Labrador, Canada
- Genres: Reggae
- Years active: 2006–2014
- Members: Mark Wilson, Erin Best, Aneirin Thomas, Craig Millett, Paul Schiralli-Earle, Chris Power, Luke Power, Chris Harnett, Susan Evoy, John Duff, Curtis Andrews
- Past members: Tommy Duggan, B.A. Wheeler
- Website: idlers.ca

Idlers is a Canadian reggae band from St. John's, Newfoundland and Labrador, consisting of eleven members.

== History ==
Idlers was founded in 2006 by Paul Schiralli-Earle, Tommy Duggan, and Mark Wilson, and released an EP that year. By the time that the band's first full album, Corner, was released in 2008, there were ten members. The band toured in Canada as far as the prairie provinces.

In March 2009, Idlers traveled to Dreamland Studio in West Hurley, New York, to record their second album, Keep Out. Darryl Jenifer, Bad Brains bassist and Bedouin Soundclash producer, produced the album. The engineer was Phil Burnett. That year they also performed at the Newfoundland and Labrador Folk Festival, and later and toured in western Canada, including British Columbia. Keep Out won an East Coast Music Award for best world music album.

In 2011, the band opened for NOFX's concert in St. John's.

The band has been inactive since 2014.

== Members ==
- Mark Wilson – vocals, trumpet
- Erin Best – vocals
- Aneirin Thomas – bass
- Craig Millett- vocals, guitar
- Chris Power – drums
- Luke Power – keys
- Chris Harnett – saxophone
- Susan Evoy – saxophone
- John Duff – trombone
- Curtis Andrews – percussion
- B.A. Wheeler – drums
- Tommy Duggan – bass
- Paul Schiralli-Earle – guitar, vocals, song writing

== Discography ==
- Idlers EP (2006)
- Corner (2007)
- Keep Out (2009)
- Idlers (2013)
