= Two Hours Traffic =

Canadian indie rock band

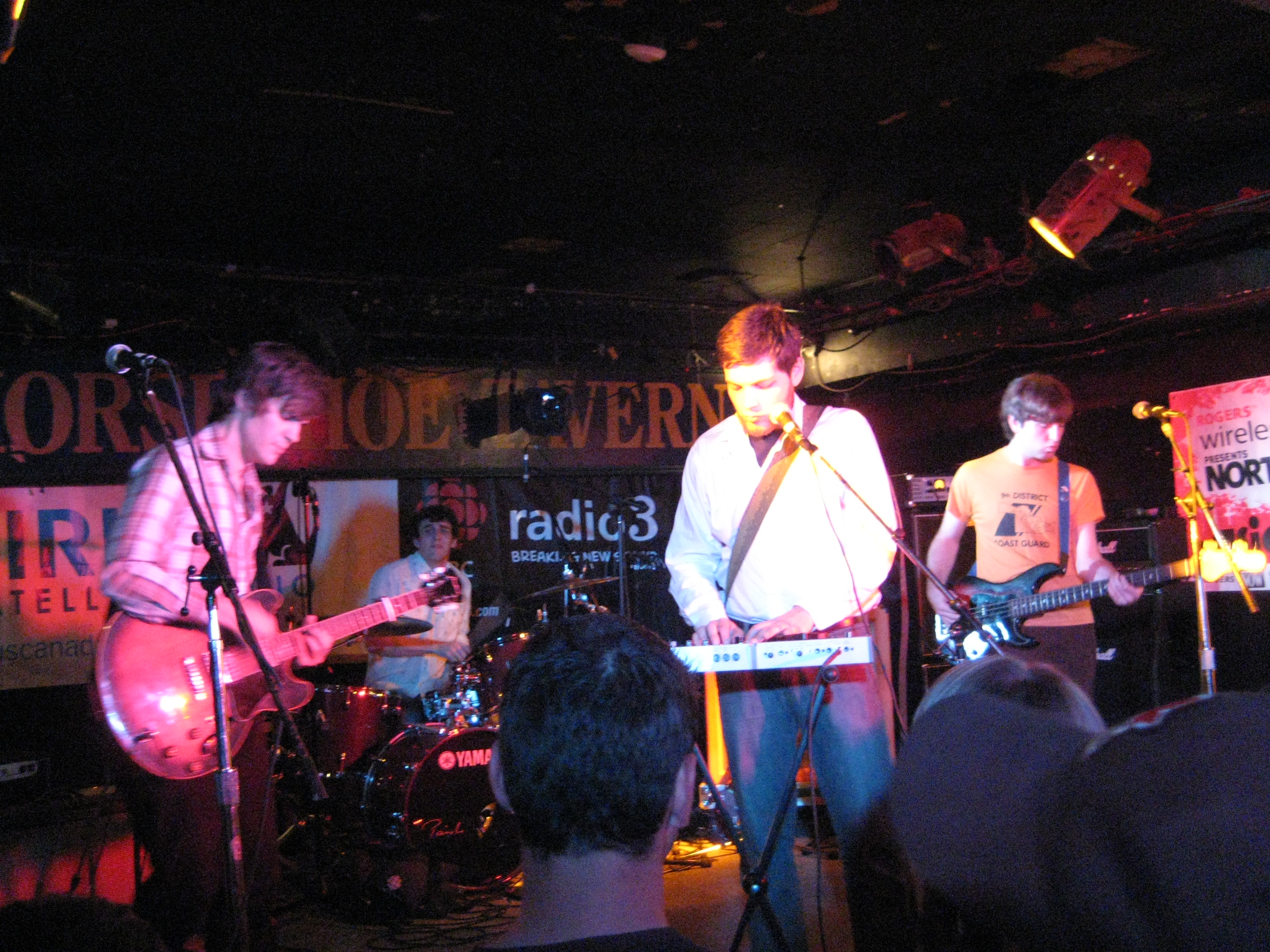
- Two Hours Traffic performing at the 2007 NXNE festival

Background information
- Origin: Charlottetown, Prince Edward Island, Canada
- Genres: Indie rock Power pop
- Years active: 2000–2013, 2018–present
- Labels: MapleMusic; Bumstead
- Members: Liam Corcoran; Andrew MacDonald; Derek Ellis; Nick Doneff
- Past members: Nathan Gill; Alec O'Hanley
- Website: twohourstraffic.ca

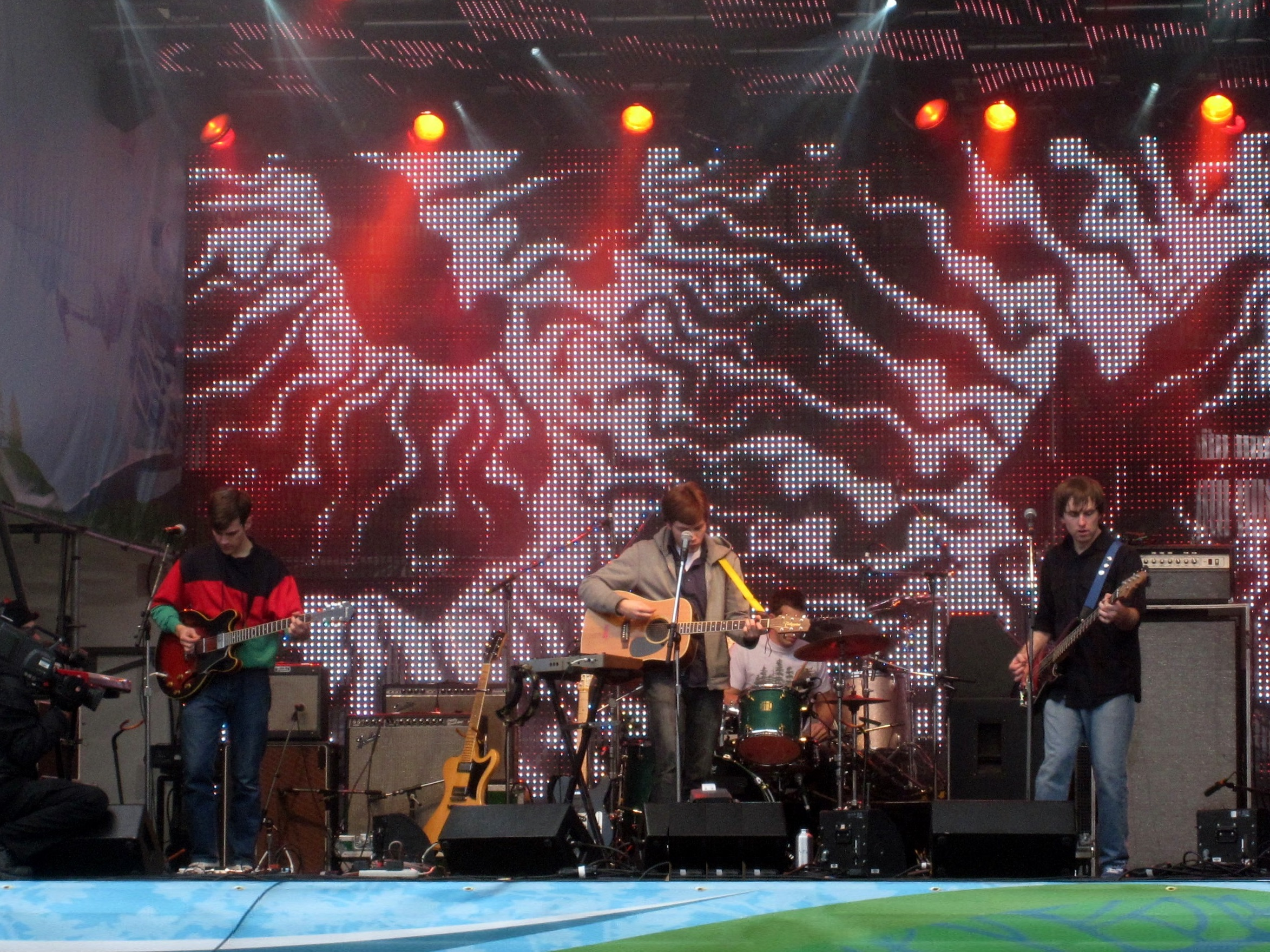
Two Hours Traffic performing during the 2010 Winter Olympics in Whistler.

Two Hours Traffic is a Canadian indie rock band, based in Charlottetown, Prince Edward Island. They are named after a line in the prologue to Shakespeare's Romeo and Juliet. Critics have drawn comparisons to 1970s power pop band Big Star, but the band members tend to cite Nick Lowe as a prime influence. The band was nominated for the Polaris Music Prize in 2008 for the album Little Jabs. In 2013, the band performed on their final tour, disbanding afterward. In 2025, they reunited to record and release new music.

== History ==
Founded by Liam Corcoran (lead vocals and guitar), and Alec O'Hanley (guitar, keyboards and vocals), the group added bassist Andrew MacDonald, and drummer Derek Ellis to its roster in 2002 after meeting while attending the University of Prince Edward Island. While all were age 19, the quartet recorded a demo titled The April Storm. After handing a copy of the EP to Canadian musician Joel Plaskett at one of his Charlottetown performances, a collaborative relationship formed. In 2005, the band released their full-length, self-titled Two Hours Traffic.

The group has performed and toured with various East Coast artists such as Plaskett himself, In-Flight Safety, and Wintersleep. The self-titled album was recognized with the group's first nomination at the 2006 East Coast Music Awards, for Rock Recording of the Year. Their videos "Better Sorry than Safe", "Stuck for the Summer", and "Jezebel" have been in rotation on MuchMusic. The group released a six-song EP entitled Isolator on September 26, 2006. Isolator was also produced by Joel Plaskett. It was nominated for Alternative Recording of the Year at the 2007 East Coast Music Awards.

Their second full-length album, Little Jabs, produced by Joel Plaskett, was released on Bumstead Records in July 2007. Documentary film director Ron Mann directed the video for "Jezebel", Mann's first foray into music videos. Little Jabs has led to the band's most chart success to date, reaching the top ten of Chart magazine's Canadian College Radio Top 50 Chart.

The band won Group of the Year and Alternative Rock Recording of the Year at the 2007 Music P.E.I. Awards.

The group's songs have been featured in Gossip Girl, The O.C., The Secret Life of the American Teenager, One Tree Hill, and Castle. Most recently their songs were featured on 18 to Life.

In 2008, Little Jabs was shortlisted for the Polaris Music Prize.

The band's 2009 album, Territory was produced by Plaskett as well, and mixed by Howard Redekopp.

Two Hours Traffic were also winners of the 8th annual Independent Music Awards Vox Pop vote for best Poster (artwork by Rebecca Ford).

In September 2011, it was announced that guitarist Alec O'Hanley would be leaving the band. The announcement also indicated that the band would carry on and are working on a new record for release in 2012. On January 26, 2012, the band announced that Nathan Gill would join as the new bassist, with MacDonald taking over on guitar.

The band's fourth full-length album, Foolish Blood, was released on February 19, 2013, to positive reviews. Blurt Magazine praised the album saying, "Like a reincarnated Big Star, complete with sweet melodies that last for days and hooks sharp enough to piece flesh, the band's latest Foolish Blood (their seventh if you loop in EPs), is one of their strongest efforts to date". Exclaim! gave the album 8/10 and declared "Foolish Blood's low-end textures and diverse layers guarantee that the Maritime icons will remain relevant for years to come." NOW Magazine gave the album 4 stars and noted the band's "stunning pop chops".

On October 28, 2013, the band announced a farewell tour to take place in the coming December, covering several Canadian cities. Corcoran clarified that a major reason for the split, despite the band's success, is that it is difficult to sustain an income in this business.

In 2025, they reunited to record and release new music, beginning with the single "Keep It Coming" in January, leading to the release of the EP I Never See You Anymore in May. The new recordings included a cover of Joel Plaskett's "Deny, Deny, Deny" for the Plaskett tribute album Songs from the Gang.

== Other projects ==
Liam Corcoran is active as a solo artist. Alec O'Hanley is part of Alvvays. Andy MacDonald and Derek Ellis are part of Charlottetown band Golden Cinema.

== Nominations and awards ==
"Polaris Music Prize"

2008 - Short List Finalist ("Little Jabs")

2008 - Long List ("Little Jabs")

"'East Coast Music Awards (ECMA)'"

2026 - Rock/Alternative Recording of the Year ("I Never See You Anymore") - Nominated

2026 - Group of the Year - Nominated

2014 - Album of the Year ("Foolish Blood") - Nominated

2014 - Pop Recording of the Year ("Foolish Blood") - Nominated

2011 - Fan's Choice Video Of The Year - Nominated

2010 - Group Recording Of The Year ("Territory") - Nominated

2010 - Pop Recording Of The Year ("Territory") - Nominated

2008 - FACTOR Recording Of The Year ("Little Jabs") - Nominated

2008 - Pop Recording Of The Year ("Little Jabs") - Won

2008 - Video Of The Year ("Jezebel") - Nominated

2007 - Alternative Recording Of The Year ("Isolator") - Nominated

"'Music Prince Edward Island (MPEI)'"

2026 - Rock Recording of the Year ("I Never See You Anymore") - Won

2026 - Single of the Year ("Keep It Coming") - Nominated

2014 - Pop Recording of the Year ("Foolish Blood") - Nominated

2014 - Group Recording of the Year ("Foolish Blood") - Nominated

2013 - Entertainer Of The Year - Nominated

2013 - SpinCount Touring Artist Of The Year - Nominated

2013 - Video Of The Year ("Amour Than Amis") - Nominated

2011 - Video Of The Year ("Noisemaker") - Nominated

2010 - Songwriter Of The Year ("Noisemaker") - Nominated

2010 - Group Of The Year - Nominated

2010 - Album Of The Year ("Territory") - Nominated

2010 - Pop Recording Of The Year ("Territory") - Nominated

2007 - Group Of The Year - Won

2007 - Alternative Rock Recording Of The Year - Won

== Discography ==
- 2003: The April Storm (EP)
- 2005: Two Hours Traffic
- 2006: Isolator (EP)
- 2007: Little Jabs
- 2009: Territory
- 2012: Siren Spell (EP)
- 2013: Foolish Blood
- 2025: I Never See You Anymore (EP)

== Founding members ==
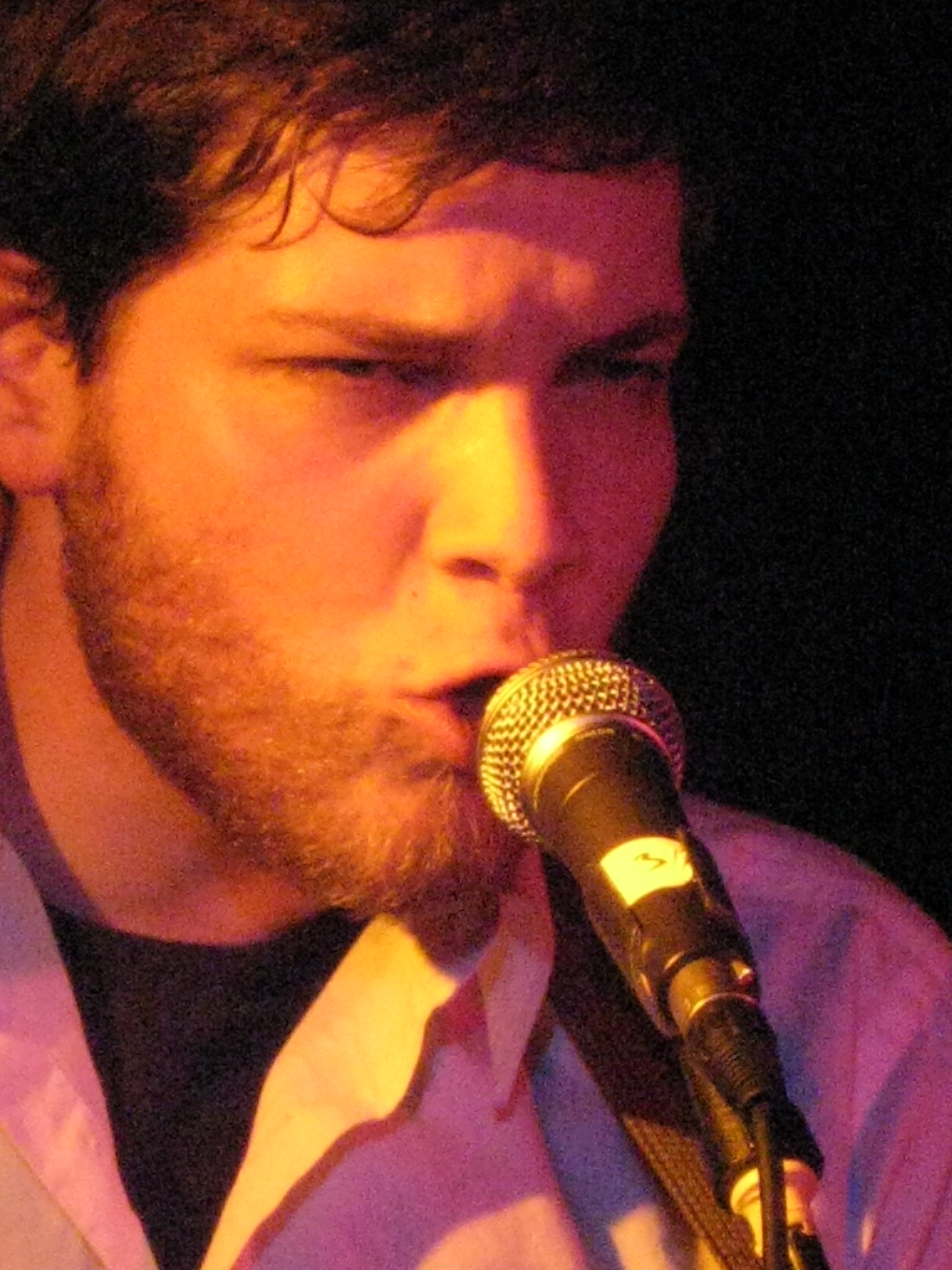
Liam Corcoran
lead vocals

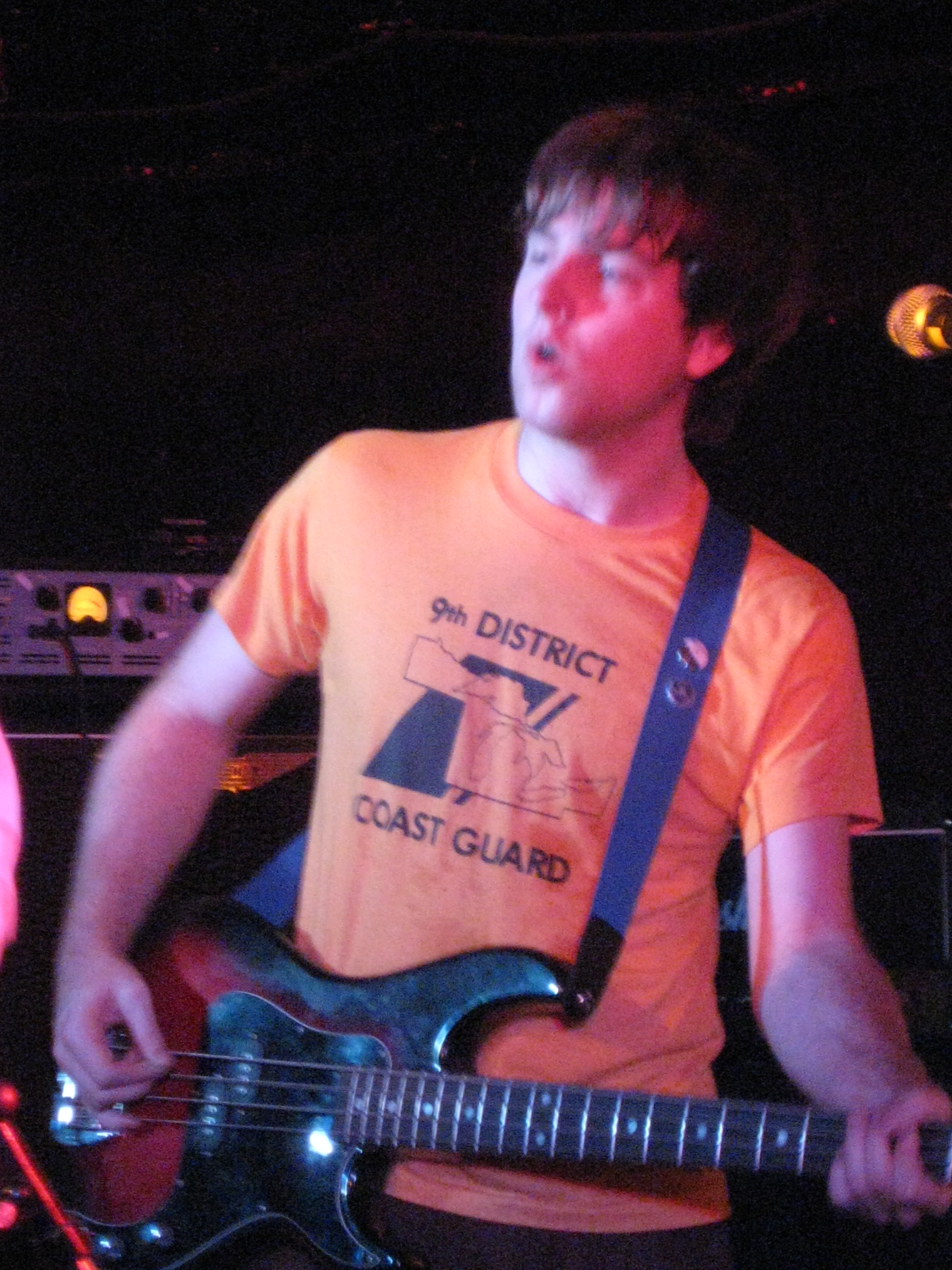
Andrew MacDonald
bass guitar

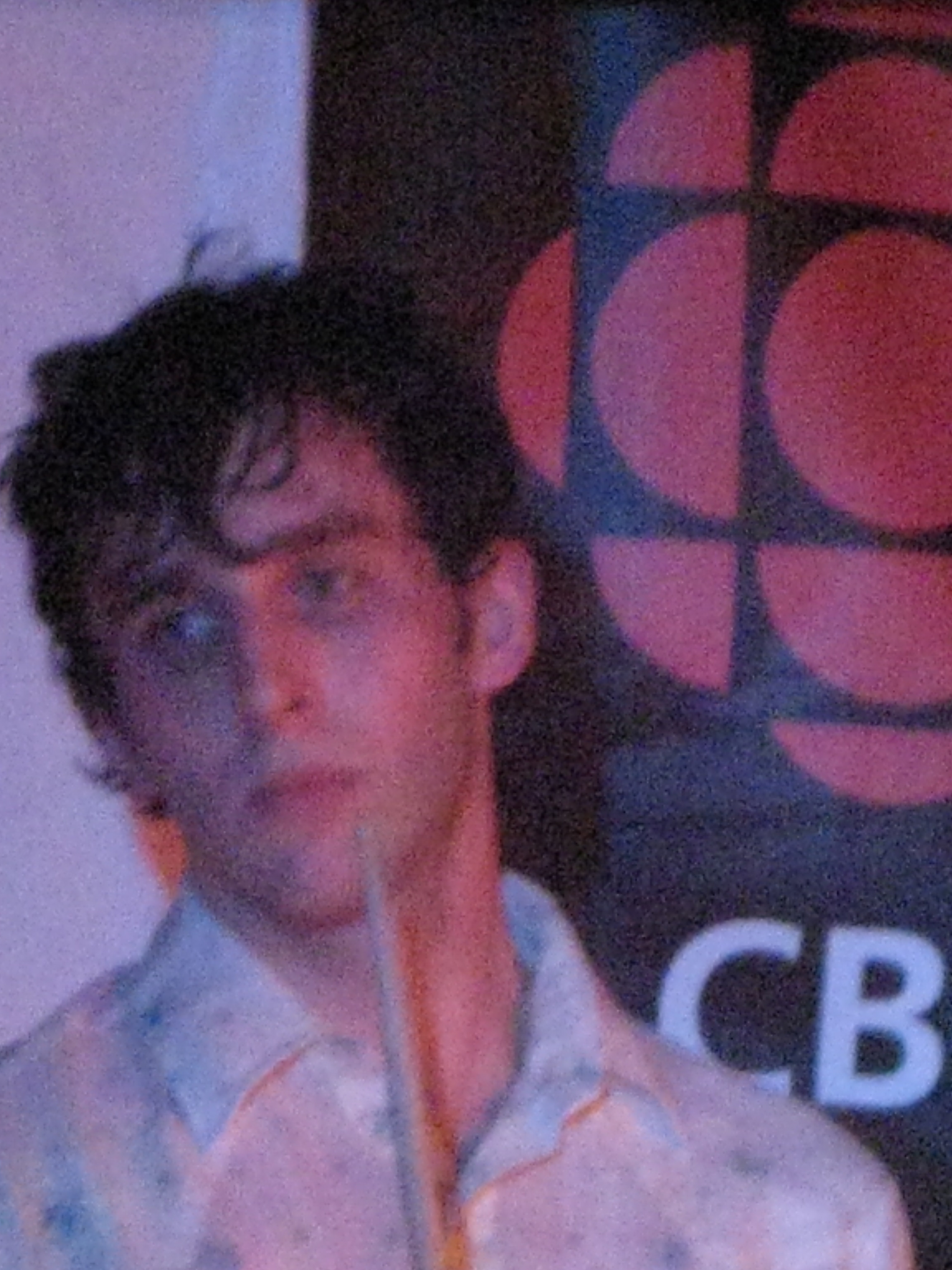
Derek Ellis
drums

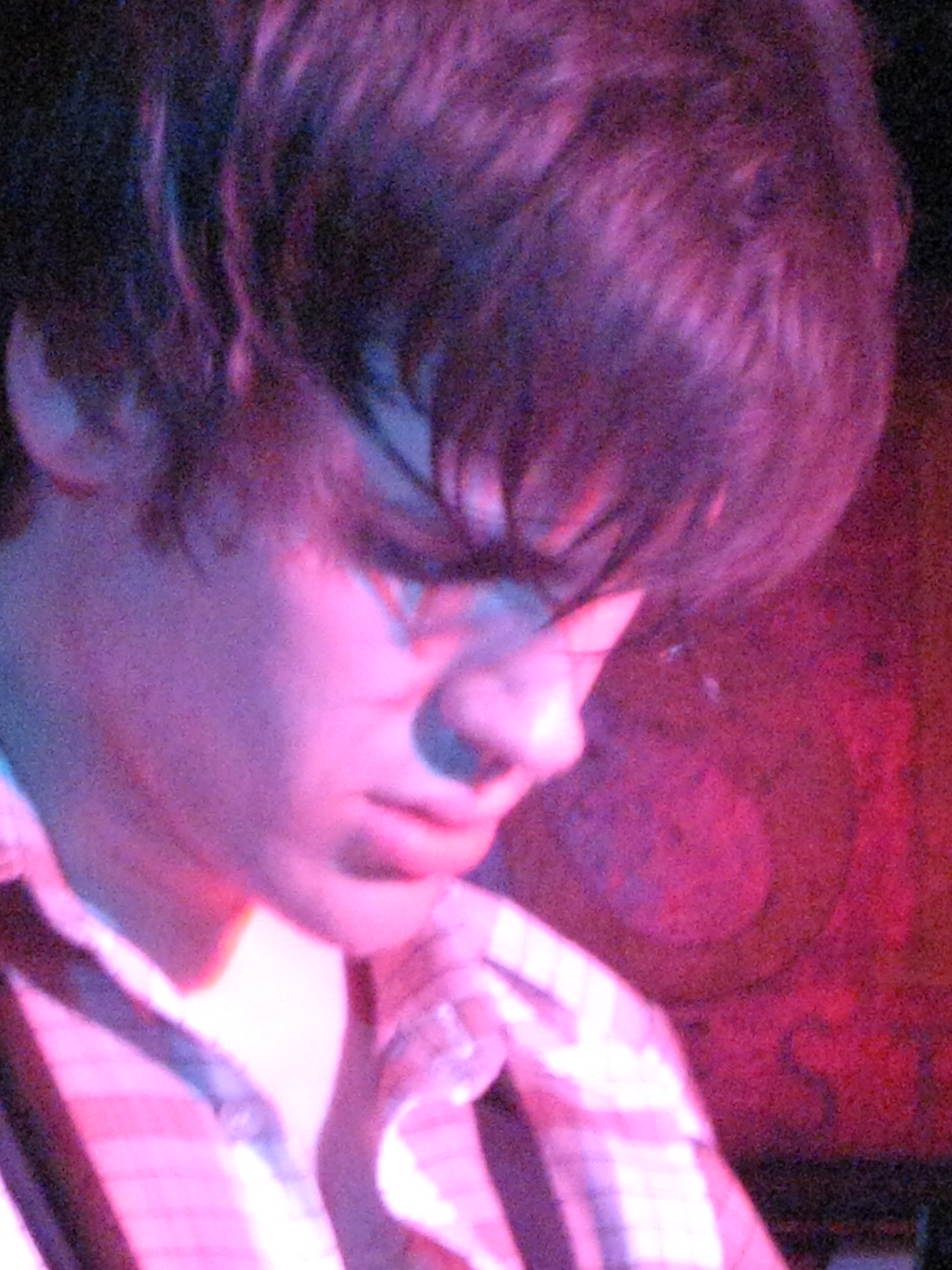
Alec O'Hanley
guitar
