= Boy (Canadian band) =

Canadian indie pop band

- Origin: Whitehorse, Yukon, Canada
- Genres: Indie pop, indie rock
- Years active: 2002–2008
- Labels: Bumstead, MapleMusic
- Members: Stephen Kozmeniuk; Maurie Kaufmann; Steve Payne; Rolla Olak; James Robertson
- Website: myspace.com/boytheband (defunct)

Boy was a Canadian indie pop band, originally the solo project of Whitehorse native Stephen Kozmeniuk. The band consisted of vocalist and general instrumentalist Kozmeniuk, drummer Maurie Kaufmann, bassist Steve Payne, and guitarists Rolla Olak and James Robertson.

== History ==
Stephen Kozmeniuk (born 1982) grew up in Whitehorse, Yukon. "Boy" was initially his solo project, and he recorded his first album using Pro Tools in his bedroom in Whitehorse. In 2002, The Globe and Mail described Boy's music as "art rock with a Brit twist, combined with an ultracool, laid-back attitude". At the time, Kozmeniuk was using the name Stephen Noel. He was then signed to Bumstead Records, which re-released the album in 2003. As Boy, he toured nationally in support of the album, opening for artists such as Sam Roberts, 54-40, and Broken Social Scene.

Boy then expanded to a five-man band with new members guitarist James Robertson of Toronto; drummer Maurie Kaufmann from Nanaimo; bassist Steve Payne from Winnipeg; and guitarist Rolla Olak from Victoria. The 2004 album, Every Page You Turn, produced by Brenndan McGuire of Sloan fame, was recorded in a Vancouver Island cabin. The lead single, "Same Old Song", received airplay on rock radio stations across Canada, peaking at #6 on Canada's Rock chart. The song was also featured on the soundtrack of the video game FIFA 06. The second single, "Up In This Town", also received significant airplay, peaking at #7 on Canada's Rock chart. The band toured Canada along with Pilate, and played the South by Southwest festival in Texas, and the 2005 Summer Sonic Festival in Japan.

The band's style was likened to that of Sam Roberts, with influences of late-1960s and 1970s British pop-rock music.

== Discography ==
=== Albums ===
- Boy (2002), Independent. Re-Released 2003, Bumstead Records
- Every Page You Turn (2004), MapleMusic Recordings

=== Music videos ===
Year	Song	Director(s)
2004	"Same Old Song"	
2004	"Up In This Town"	Matt Eastman
2004	"Every Page You Turn"	Matt Eastman
2006	"People Come On"	
2007	"French Diplomacy"	Matt Eastman
2007	"Joey"	Mark Lomond
