= Two Hours Traffic (album) =

Studio album by Two Hours Traffic
- Released: August 16, 2005
- Recorded: Ultramagnetic Studios, Halifax, Nova Scotia, and at Plaskett's house (tracks 8 and 12)
- Genre: Indie rock Power pop
- Length: 35:53
- Label: MapleMusic
- Producer: Joel Plaskett

Two Hours Traffic chronology
Two Hours Traffic (2005)	Little Jabs (2007)

Professional ratings
Review scores
Source	Rating
SEE Magazine	4/5 stars

Two Hours Traffic is the self-titled debut album by Two Hours Traffic, a Canadian indie rock, power pop band from Charlottetown, Prince Edward Island. It was nominated for Rock Recording of the Year at the 2006 East Coast Music Awards.

Although their music video for "Better Sorry than Safe" was in rotation on MuchMusic in late 2005, it was not until April 2006 that the band had a boost in their profile—that was when "Limelight" was used in an episode of The O.C. and "Heroes of the Sidewalk" reached #1 on the New Music Canada website.

== Track listing ==
All songs were written by Two Hours Traffic.

1. "I Feel Naked Without My Cellphone"
2. "Stick to It"
3. "Heroes of the Sidewalk"
4. "Limelight"
5. "Better Sorry than Safe"
6. "White Light"
7. "Mr. Saturday"
8. "Oz"
9. "Little Missy"
10. "Girl up the Stairs"
11. "Purpose for My Time"
12. "Selfish"
