= Hey Rosetta! =

Canadian rock band

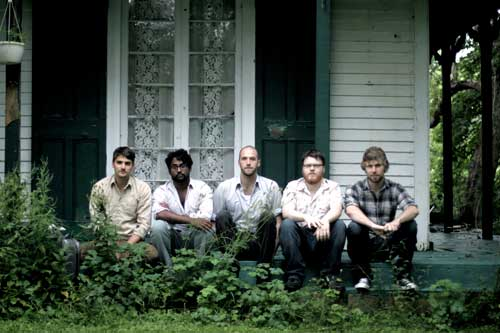
- Hey Rosetta! in 2010

Background information
- Origin: St. John's, Newfoundland and Labrador, Canada
- Genres: Indie; alternative rock; indie folk
- Years active: 2005–2017 (hiatus); 2026–present
- Labels: Sonic Records; ATO; Dine Alone (Australia)
- Members: Tim Baker; Adam Hogan; Phil Maloney; Josh Ward; Kinley Dowling; Romesh Thavanathan; Mara Pellerin
- Past members: Tiffany Pollock; Dave Lane; Ariane Alexander
- Website: heyrosetta.com

Hey Rosetta! are a Canadian seven-piece indie rock band from St. John's, Newfoundland and Labrador, led by singer-songwriter Tim Baker. They released four studio albums, five EPs, and one live album. On October 13, 2017, the group announced via a Facebook post that they would be taking an indefinite hiatus. In September 2026, the group announced a reunion tour, scheduled for 2027.

== History ==
=== Formation and EP (2005) ===
In 2005, Tim Baker brought together a group of musicians to record songs he had written. This included Adam Hogan on electric guitar, Josh Ward on bass, and Dave Lane on drums. After a few rehearsals, the band added cello and violin players and arranged their first show, choosing the name Hey Rosetta! Within a matter of months, the band had recorded and self-released a demo, simply entitled EP, consisting of four studio songs as well as three tracks from a live performance.

=== Plan Your Escape album and EP (2006–2007) ===
At the end of 2006, the band went into the studio with producer Don Ellis to begin work on their first full-length album, Plan Your Escape. The record featured 13 songs, including new recordings of "The Simplest Thing" and "Epitaph", which had appeared on EP.

Plan Your Escape earned the band acclaim and recognition. At the 2006 MusicNL Awards, Hey Rosetta! won Group of the Year, Pop/Rock Group of the Year, CBC Galaxie Rising Star of the Year, and Album of the Year.

In 2007, Hey Rosetta! signed on with Canadian label Sonic Records, and Plan Your Escape was remastered and re-released as a seven-track EP.

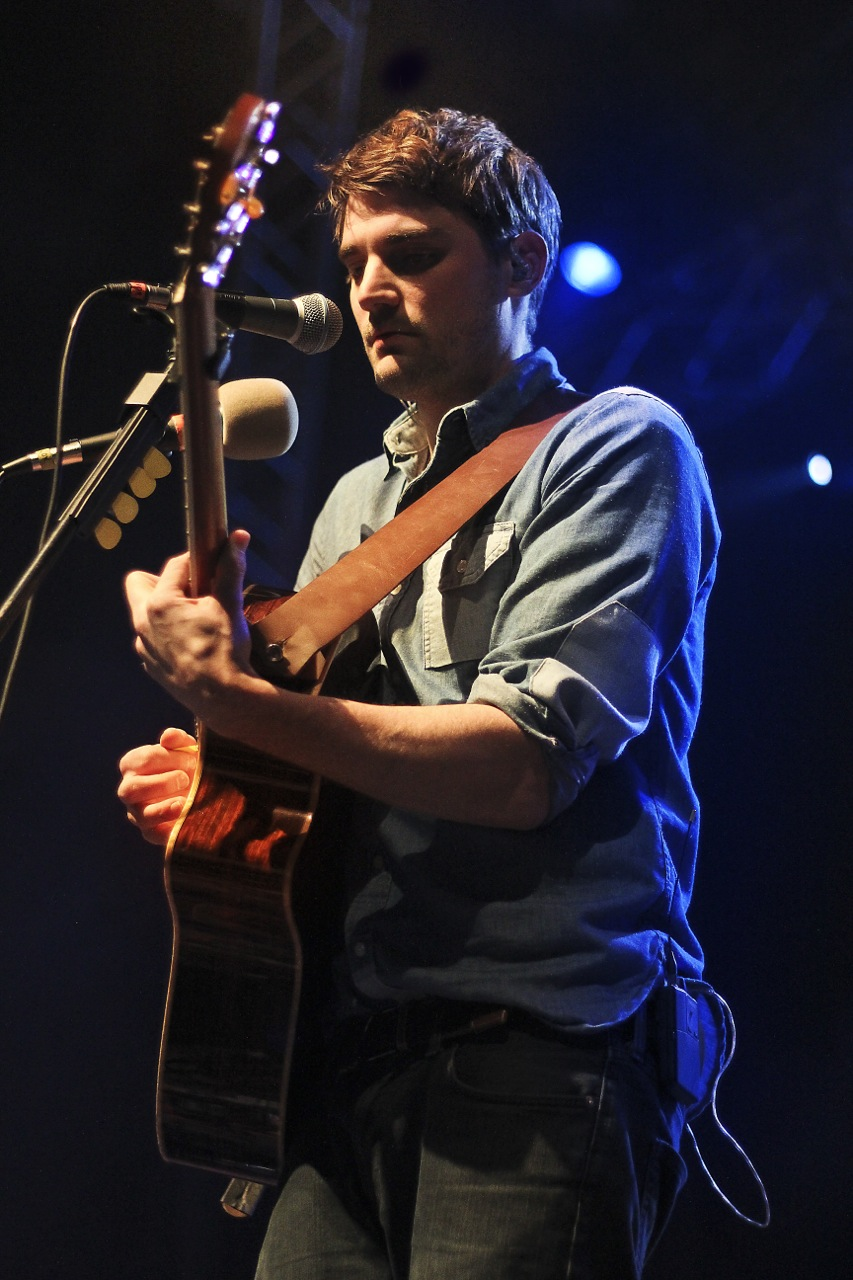
Tim Baker performing with Hey Rosetta! in 2012

=== Into Your Lungs (2007–2009) ===
At the end of 2007, Hey Rosetta!, which now included Phil Maloney on drums and Kinley Dowling on violin, began working with producer Hawksley Workman on a new album; Into Your Lungs was released in June 2008. The next two years saw the band touring in support of the new record, and they added cellist Romesh Thavanathan to their permanent lineup. Into Your Lungs was shortlisted for the 2009 Polaris Music Prize.

=== Seeds, A Cup of Kindness Yet (2010–2012) ===
For their third album, Hey Rosetta! enlisted the help of Scottish producer Tony Doogan. Seeds was released in February 2011.

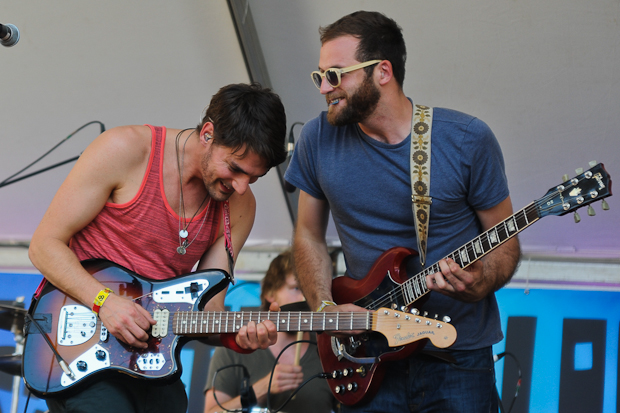
Hey Rosetta! at Bonnaroo in June 2012

In November 2012, the band published the Christmas EP A Cup of Kindness Yet.

=== Second Sight (2014) ===
Sessions for the band's fourth studio album, Second Sight, began in 2013 and continued until May 2014. Several of the songs were recorded on Fogo Island, NL. The lead single, "Kintsukuroi", was released on August 4, 2014, and the album came out in Canada on October 21. A second single, "Soft Offering (For the Oft Suffering)", was issued on September 12, 2014, via Sonic Records' SoundCloud page. Second Sight won the 2015 Borealis Music Prize.

In October 2015, the band collaborated with Yukon Blonde on the non-album single "Land You Love", a protest song about the 2015 federal election.

=== Hiatus (2017–2026) ===
On October 13, 2017, Hey Rosetta! announced in a Facebook post that they would be going on an indefinite hiatus. They stated that some of the members felt they needed a break, and additionally, that all of them had decided to focus on their own projects outside of the band for the time being. They played their final show on December 22, 2017, at Mile One Centre, St. John's, including a cover of Ben E. King's "Stand by Me".

=== End of hiatus (2026-present) ===
In September 2026, the band announced that they would reunite for a series of comeback shows in St John's, Montreal, and Toronto, in 2027.

== Band members ==
Current

- Tim Baker – vocals, piano, guitar
- Adam Hogan – guitar
- Phil Maloney – drums
- Josh Ward – bass
- Kinley Dowling – violin
- Romesh Thavanathan – cello
- Mara Pellerin – horns

Past

- Tiffany Pollock – cello
- Dave Lane – drums
- Ariane Alexander – violin

== Discography ==
Studio albums

- Plan Your Escape (2006)
- Into Your Lungs (2008)
- Seeds (2011)
- Second Sight (2014)

Live albums

- Live from the Corona Theatre (2012)

EPs

- EP (2005)
- Plan Your Escape (2007)
- Red Songs (2010)
- Sing Sing Sessions (2012)
- A Cup of Kindness Yet (2012)

Singles

Year	Song	Chart peak		Album
Year	Song	CAN Alt	CAN Rock	Album
2011	"Welcome"	14	50	Seeds
2011	"Yer Spring"	25	45	Seeds
2011	"Seeds"	50	—	Seeds
2014	"Kintsukuroi"	11	—	Second Sight
2014	"Soft Offering (For the Oft Suffering)"	22	—	Second Sight
2015	"Gold Teeth"	38	—	Second Sight
2017	"Stand by Me"	–	—	Non-album single
"—" denotes a release that did not chart.

== See also ==
- Canadian rock
- List of Canadian musicians
- List of bands from Canada
