= Bumstead Records =

Canadian record label

Bumstead Records & Bumstead Productions
- Parent company: Nettwerk
- Founded: 1979
- Founder: Larry Wanagas
- Status: Acquired 2014
- Genre: Rock Music, Country rock, Indie Rock, Pop Music
- Country of origin: Canada
- Location: Edmonton, Alberta
- Official website: http://www.nettwerk.com

Bumstead Records was a small record label in Edmonton, Alberta, founded by Larry Wanagas in 1979 and run primarily out of the Edmonton recording studio Homestead Recorders. Wanagas launched k.d. lang's career and continued for 15 years as her label and management company, with many tours, multi-platinum sales, accolades and awards.

Bumstead's management arm, Bumstead Productions Ltd. represented a number of successful artists including Susan Aglukark, Big Sugar, The Blue Shadows (featuring Billy Cowsill), BOY, Erasure (North America), Colin James, Emma-Lee, Madeleine Peyroux, The Modern Minds (featuring Moe Berg), Staggered Crossing, John Ford, Peter Elkas, The East Pointers, Tim Chaisson, Two Hours Traffic, The Lazys, Poor Young Things, Yukon Blonde and The Trews.

Wanagas, who co-founded the Alberta Recording Industry Association and was presented with the Lifetime Achievement Award by the Music Managers Forum in 2012, announced his retirement in 2017.

== Discography ==
- The Modern Minds - Theresa's World, 1980
- k.d. lang - Friday Dance Promenade, 1983
- k.d. lang and The Reclines - Live Tape-Cover Songs, 1984
- k.d. lang and The Reclines - A Truly Western Experience, 1984, 1986, 1991, 2010
- Colin James – Hook, Line And Single ("Five Long Years" / "Why'd You Lie"?), 1986
- k.d. lang and The Reclines - K.d. Lang And The Reclines With The Edmonton Symphony Nov 9/85, 1987
- Glen Stace - Buddhahotel, 1991
- Glen Stace - Three To Get Ready...Four To Go, 1991
- Glen Stace - Road To Damascus, 1992
- Monarch Brothers - Superstar, 1999
- The Trews - The Trews, 2002
- The Trews - House of Ill Fame, 2003
- Boy - Boy, 2003
- The Trews - Every Inambition, 2004
- Rocketface - Rocketface, 2005
- The Trews - Den Of Thieves, 2007
- The Trews - Out of the Past, Into the Dark, 2007
- Two Hours Traffic - Little Jabs, 2007
- The Trews - No Time For Later, 2008
- The Trews - Acoustic: Friends & Total Strangers, 2009
- Two Hours Traffic - Territory, 2009
- The Trews - Highway Of Heroes, 2010
- The Trews - Hope & Ruin, 2011
- The Trews - Misery Loves Company, 2011
- The Trews - Thank You and I'm Sorry, 2012
- Two Hours Traffic - Siren Spell, 2012
- Two Hours Traffic - Foolish Blood, 2013
- The Blue Shadows - On The Floor Of Heaven, 2010 (first released by Columbia Records 1993)
- Yukon Blonde - Yukon Blonde, 2010
- Poor Young Things - Let It Sleep, 2011
- Tim Chaisson - The Other Side, 2012
- Poor Young Things - The Heart. The Head. The End., 2013

== See also ==
- List of record labels
