= Tim Baker (musician) =

Canadian musician

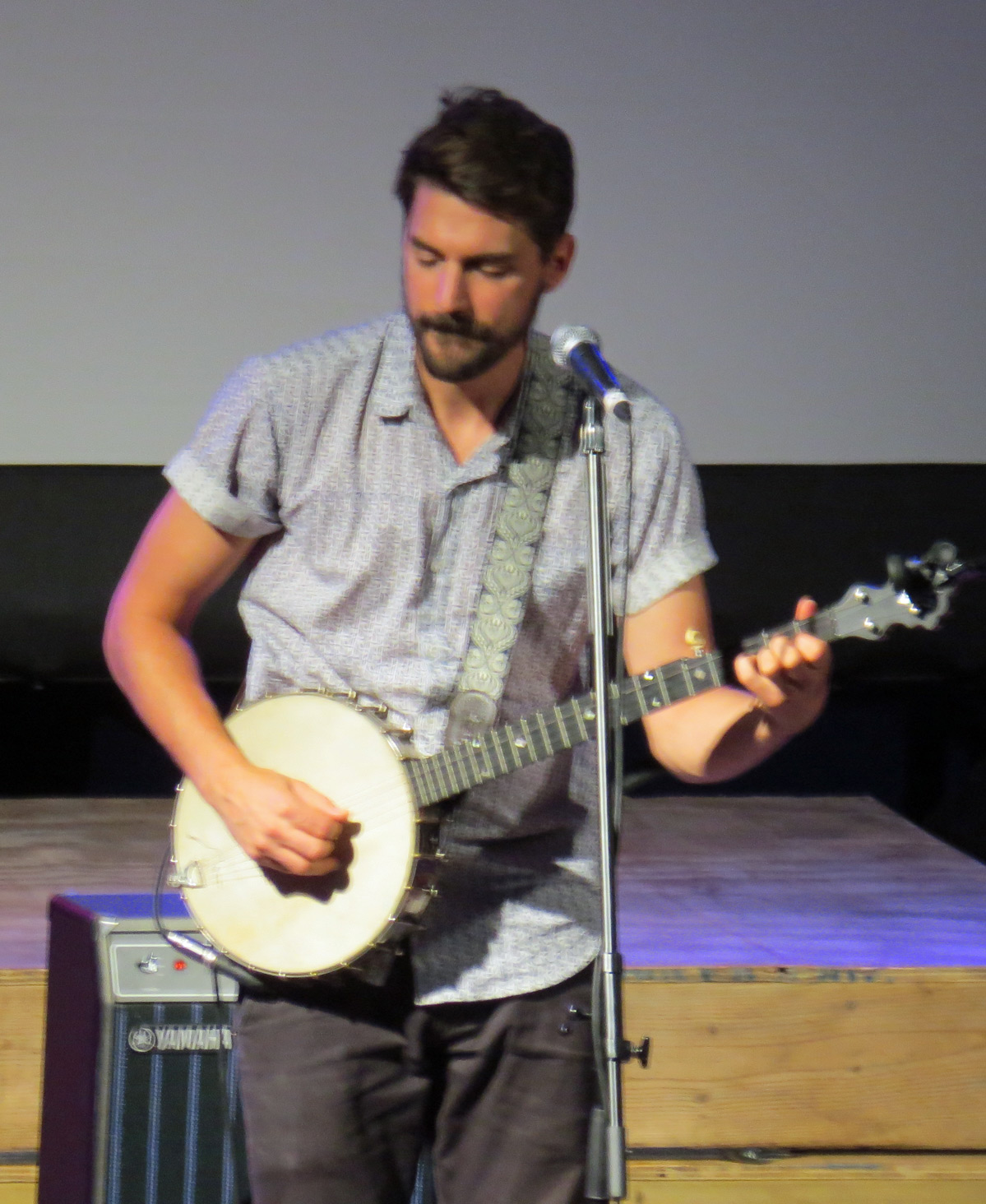
- Tim Baker at the 2019 Peterborough Folk Festival

Background information
- Origin: St. John's, Newfoundland and Labrador, Canada
- Genres: indie rock; pop rock; folk rock; indie folk
- Occupation: Singer-songwriter
- Instruments: Vocals; guitar
- Years active: 2000s—present
- Label: Arts & Crafts
- Member of: Hey Rosetta!

Tim Baker is a Canadian singer-songwriter from St. John's, Newfoundland and Labrador. The longtime lead singer of the indie rock band Hey Rosetta!, his first solo album Forever Overhead was released on April 19, 2019, on Arts & Crafts.

== Background ==
Baker was educated at Concordia University, where he planned to study piano but developed tendonitis that prevented him from being able to play for his admission audition, and thus studied creative writing. Following his graduation, he returned to St. John's, where he began performing locally as a solo artist before deciding that his songs needed a fuller band sound and forming Hey Rosetta!

With Hey Rosetta! Tim Baker was the writer and front man of the band. The Juno-nominated, Polaris-shortlisted, and multi award-winning band expanded their reach from St. John’s, Newfoundland, internationally. After over 15 years of performing in stadiums, clubs, theatres and major festivals all over the world, Hey Rosetta! disbanded in 2017. Baker transitioned from being the band's leader and songwriter to establish his solo career as a songwriter and producer. In September of 2026, Hey Rosetta! announced they would reunite for a series of comeback shows in 2027.

== Solo career ==
In 2016, Baker debuted his first solo song, "Spirit", on the CBC Radio news program The Current as part of a special series on the economic challenges of life in Newfoundland. The song appears on Forever Overhead.

In June 2019, Forever Overhead was named to the initial longlist for the 2019 Polaris Music Prize. At the Juno Awards of 2020, he received a nomination for Songwriter of the Year, for the songs "All Hands", "Dance" and "The Eighteenth Hole".

In July 2020, he released the Survivors EP.

On July 26, 2021, he performed his song "Songbirds" at the investiture of Mary Simon as Governor General of Canada.

In 2021, he did a duet with Rose Cousins on a new re-recording of her song "The Lullaby (My Oldest Love)".

His second solo album, The Festival, was released on October 21, 2022. The album has 10 tracks in total, including the singles "Lucky Few", "Some Day", and "Echo Park". "Echo Park" was written during Baker's time as the lead singer of Hey Rosetta!

He followed up with the EP Along the Mountain Road, released in October 2023. The EP was supported by a national tour, with opening acts Matt Holubowski in Western Canada and Haley Heynderickx in Eastern Canada. In the same year he recorded a cover of "Leaving on the Evening Tide" for the Ron Hynes tribute album Sonny Don't Go Away.

His third solo album, a collection of original Christmas-themed music titled Full Rainbow of Light, was released on November 15, 2024. The album is centered around themes of home, nostalgia, love and family.

On June 10, 2025, Baker released the politically charged single "Giant Eye".

Baker released a deluxe edition of Full Rainbow of Light on December 5, 2025, containing three previously unreleased songs: "Every Ribbon", a cover of "The Rebel Jesus" by Jackson Browne and The Chieftains, and "A Little Bit of Room". "Every Ribbon" and "The Rebel Jesus" were released as singles on November 24 and December 3 respectively.

== Personal life ==
Baker was previously in a relationship with singer-songwriter Nico Paulo.

== Discography ==
Solo albums

- Forever Overhead (2019)
- The Festival (2022)
- Full Rainbow of Light (2024)

Extended plays

- The Eighteenth Hole Variations (2019)
- Survivors (2020)
- Along The Mountain Road (2023)

Singles

- Dance (2019)
- All Hands (2019)
- Sylvan Valley (2020)
- Lucky Few (2022)
- Some Day (2022)
- Year of the Dog (2022)
- Echo Park (2022)
- Twenty Twenty (2023)
- Leaving on the Evening Tide (2023)
- Pilgrims (2023)
- Songbirds (2024)
- Half-Built Buildings (2024)
- It's Tonight (2024)
- Full Rainbow (2024)
- Giant Eye (2025)
- Every Ribbon (2025)
- The Rebel Jesus (2025)

Featured Singles

- Sun Will Rise (2020) - James Hurley with Tim Baker
- The Lullaby (My Oldest Love) (2021) - Rose Cousins with Tim Baker

== Awards and Accolades ==
- Juno Award nomination ‘Songwriter of the Year’
- Polaris Long List
- 3x East Coast Music Awards award winner
- 13x East Coast Music Awards nominations
- 2x Polaris Shortlist (Hey Rosetta!)
- 1x Juno nomination (Hey Rosetta!)
- 1x SiriusXM Album of the Year Award
- 8x ECMA award winner (Hey Rosetta!)
