= Midnight Machines =

EP by Lights
- Released: April 8, 2016
- Studio: Revolution Recording (Toronto, ON)
- Genre: Pop
- Length: 39:10
- Label: Warner Bros.
- Producer: Lights; Tawgs Salter

Lights chronology
Little Machines (2014)	Midnight Machines (2016)	Skin & Earth (2017)

Midnight Machines is the fifth extended play recorded by Canadian electropop singer-songwriter Lights. It was released April 8, 2016 through Warner Bros. Records. The collection serves as a companion to her 2014 album, Little Machines, featuring six acoustic versions of tracks from that album alongside two newly-recorded songs. Midnight Machines received praise from critics for its maturity and earned Lights her sixth top ten album in Canada.

== Release and promotion ==
Midnight Machines was announced and became available for pre-order on March 4, 2016. The acoustic version of "Meteorites" was released to digital retailers that day as the EP's only promotional single. An official music video for the song also premiered March 4. The EP was released April 8, 2016 in digital, physical, and vinyl formats.

== Critical reception ==
Professional ratings
Review scores
Source	Rating
Allmusic	4/5 stars
Exclaim!	8/10
Renowned for Sound	5/5 stars

Matt Collar of AllMusic rated the EP four stars out of five and wrote that the "folky, intimate nature" of Midnight Machines allows Lights to "wring even more depth and illumination from the songs." He also wrote that the EP "plays less like an acoustic afterthought and more like [a] sincerely crafted work." Sarah Towle of Exclaim! rated the EP eight out of ten and wrote that "if Little Machines made you want dance, its counterpart Midnight Machines is what you want on at the after party, when the lights go down and shit gets real." Brendon Veevers of Renowned for Sound gave the EP a perfect five stars out of five review and wrote that the record "marks a new level of skill and craft in the Lights repertoire" with "pristine, precise and perfectly executed re-imaginations."

== Commercial performance ==
Midnight Machines debuted at number nine on the Billboard Canadian Albums Chart dated April 30, 2016. This earned Lights her sixth top ten album on the chart. In the United States, the EP entered the Billboard 200 at number 104 and the Vinyl Albums sales chart at number 16.

== Track listing ==
No.	Title	Writer(s)	Length
1.	"Up We Go"	Lights Poxleitner; Thomas "Tawgs" Salter	5:39
2.	"Same Sea"	Poxleitner; Salter; Jason "Human Kebab" Parsons	4:12
3.	"Follow You Down"	Poxleitner	4:42
4.	"Meteorites"	Poxleitner; Salter	5:07
5.	"Don't Go Home Without Me"	Poxleitner	4:17
6.	"Running with the Boys"	Poxleitner; Drew Pearson	5:34
7.	"Head Cold"	Poxleitner	4:05
8.	"Muscle Memory"	Poxleitner; Pearson	5:34
Total length:			39:10

== Charts ==
Chart (2016)	Peak position
Canadian Albums (Billboard)	9
US Billboard 200	104
US Vinyl Albums (Billboard)	16
