= Up We Go =

Single by Lights

from the album Little Machines
- Released: July 22, 2014
- Genre: Synthpop
- Length: 2:51
- Label: LIGHTS Music; Warner Bros.
- Songwriters: Lights; Thomas "Tawgs" Salter
- Producers: Drew Pearson; Tawgs Salter

Lights singles chronology
"Cactus in the Valley" (2013)	"Up We Go" (2014)	"Running with the Boys" (2015)

"Up We Go" is a song recorded by Canadian electropop artist Lights for her third studio album, Little Machines (2014). Written by Lights in collaboration with songwriter-producer Tawgs Salter, the song was released July 22, 2014 via LIGHTS Music as the lead single from the album. In the United States, it was released to modern rock radio through Warner Bros. Records on September 9, 2014.

The song has enjoyed commercial success - it reached number 31 on the Billboard Canadian Hot 100 and the top ten on multiple airplay formats, and was certified Gold by Music Canada in January 2015 - and was also met with positive reviews from contemporary music critics, being described as "impossibly catchy."

== Composition ==
"Up We Go" is a synthpop song that combines Lights' signature electro-influenced pop production style with "lush" guitars. Jeff Benjamin of fuse described the style as a compromise between the lighter synths of her debut and the grittier electropop territory explored on Siberia. Lyrically, the song is an anthem about persevering through difficult times, with the chorus assuring the listener that "from down this low / It's only up we go".

== Critical reception ==
The song received mostly positive reviews from contemporary music critics. In his "Song of the Day" spotlight featuring "Up We Go", Jeff Benjamin of fuse praised Lights for "[mixing] clever lyrics... with inspiring lyrics about persevering and looking forward to the brighter day" and was also complimentary of the shift in her sound. Also praising the lighter musical approach, Greg Moskovitch of Music Feeds wrote that "[t]he punchy, synth-pop production provides a soaring and glittering soundbed for Poxleitner’s motivational lyrics, which lead into an anthemic, impossibly catchy chorus." British music blog Popjustice rated the song 8/10 and felt the song had the potential to elevate Lights's career to the next level: "Canadian electronic pop expert Lights hasn't yet enjoyed the UK success she deserves... which is a shame, because if this excellent first track from her new album 'Little Machines' is anything to go by she's about to scale new heights."

== Chart performance ==
"Up We Go" debuted at number 84 on the Billboard Canadian Hot 100 for the chart dated August 9, 2014. On the chart dated November 8, 2014, "Up We Go" reached a new peak of number 31, becoming her second highest-charting single yet, behind "Drive My Soul", which peaked at number 18. It debuted at number 42 on Canada CHR/Top 40 on the chart issued September 13, 2014, as well as number 47 on Canada Hot AC and number 43 on Canada AC the following week. The song has since peaked in the top 10 on the former two, and the top 5 on the latter.

== Music video ==
The official music video for "Up We Go" was directed by Alon Isocianu and premiered on Lights's VEVO channel on September 3, 2014. The one shot video features the singer in an elevator, with various background events and characters appearing as the doors open to new locations.

== Other appearances ==
The single also features in the soundtrack and in-game radio songs of EA's The Sims 4, on the first expansion pack of the game, Get to Work, released in 2015. The song has been remixed to be sung in the Sims language, Simlish.

== Track listings ==
Digital download

1. "Up We Go" - 2:51

Digital download — Borgeous Remix

1. "Up We Go" (Borgeous Remix) - 4:41

Digital download — Borgeous Remix (UK)

1. "Up We Go" (Borgeous Remix) - 4:41
2. "Up We Go" (Borgeous Instrumental Remix) - 4:41

== Credits and personnel ==
Credits adapted from Little Machines liner notes.

- Lights — vocals, synths, guitar, bass, drum programming, writing
- Drew Pearson — additional synths, guitar, bass, drum programming, production, engineering
- Thomas "Tawgs" Salter — additional synths, guitar, bass, production, writing
- Jason "Human Kebab" Parsons — additional programming
- Maurie Kaufmann — drums
- Adam Weaver — synths
- Spike Stent — mixing
- João Carvalho — mastering

== Charts ==
=== Weekly charts ===
Chart (2014–15)	Peak position
Canada Hot 100 (Billboard)	31
Canada AC (Billboard)	5
Canada CHR/Top 40 (Billboard)	9
Canada Hot AC (Billboard)	7

=== Year-end charts ===
Chart (2015)	Position
Canada AC (Billboard)	38
Canada Hot AC (Billboard)	39

== Certifications ==
Region	Certification	Certified units/sales
Canada (Music Canada)	Gold	40,000^{*}
^{*} Sales figures based on certification alone.

== Release history ==
Country	Date	Format	Label	Ref.
Canada	July 22, 2014	Digital download	LIGHTS Music / Universal Music Canada	
United States	September 9, 2014	Modern rock	Warner Bros. Records	
United Kingdom	November 14, 2014	Digital download (Borgeous Remix)	Warner Bros. Records	
Canada	December 15, 2014	Digital download (Borgeous Remix)	LIGHTS Music / Universal Music Canada	
