= Siberia Acoustic =

Remix album by Lights
- Released: April 30, 2013
- Genre: Acoustic, pop
- Length: 35:13
- Label: Universal, Last Gang
- Producer: Lights

Lights chronology
Siberia (2011)	Siberia Acoustic (2013)	Little Machines (2014)

Singles from Siberia Acoustic
- 1. "Cactus in the Valley" Released: March 15, 2013

Siberia Acoustic (alternately stylized as Siberia (Acoustic)) is the second acoustic album recorded by Canadian electropop artist Lights, featuring acoustic reworkings of songs off her second studio album, Siberia (2011). It was released April 30, 2013 through Universal Music Group and Last Gang Records. The album was preceded on March 15 by the release of its first and only single, "Cactus in the Valley", which was re-recorded as a duet with American electronica project Owl City.

Upon its release, Siberia Acoustic debuted at number seven on the Billboard Canadian Albums Chart and at number 86 on the Billboard 200, her second-highest peak on either chart at the time. The album received generally positive reviews from contemporary music critics, who found that the acoustic production put emphasis on Lights's songwriting talents but also made the songs less compelling than in their studio renditions.

== Critical reception ==
Professional ratings
Review scores
Source	Rating
AllMusic	4/5 stars
PopMatters	6/10
Alter The Press!	4.5/5 stars

Siberia Acoustic received mostly positive reviews from contemporary music critics for showcasing her abilities as a singer-songwriter. At AllMusic, reviewer Matt Collar wrote that "although Lights normally makes electronic pop that often features electric guitars, keyboards, and dance-influenced beats, she is at her core a melodic singer-songwriter. Not surprisingly, many of the songs on Siberia lend themselves to these intimate re-recordings." He rated the album 4 stars out of 5. Brent Faulkner of PopMatters responded positively to Lights' vocals on the album ("Lights sounds superb throughout," he writes) but ultimately felt the acoustic soundscape "fails to compel as much" as Siberia′s original production. "All in all," he summarized before delivering a 6/10 rating, "Siberia Acoustic is enjoyable if sometimes bland."

Claire Louise Sheridan of Alter the Press! gave a particularly complimentary review in which she highlights Lights's vocal range and interpretive abilities. "No matter what your previous impressions of Lights may be," writes Sheridan, "cast them aside. Siberia Acoustic is a truly different experience which allows appreciation of the overwhelming beauty of her talent and thus the true basis of her appeal."

== Track listing ==
No.	Title	Writer(s)	Length
1.	"Banner"	Lights Poxleitner; Thomas "Tawgs" Salter	3:52
2.	"Cactus in the Valley" (featuring Owl City)	Poxleitner	3:22
3.	"Where the Fence is Low"	Poxleitner; Salter; Jason Parsons	3:37
4.	"Siberia" (featuring Max Kerman)	Poxleitner; Brian Borcherdt; Graham Walsh	3:22
5.	"Suspension"	Poxleitner; Salter	3:36
6.	"Toes"	Poxleitner; Salter	3:22
7.	"Peace Sign" (featuring Coeur de Pirate)	Poxleitner; Dave Thomson	2:59
8.	"Heavy Rope"	Poxleitner; Salter	4:14
9.	"Flux and Flow"	Poxleitner; Salter; Parsons	3:33
10.	"...And Counting"	Poxleitner; Thomson	3:16
Total length:			35:13

iTunes bonus track
No.	Title	Length
11.	"Timing Is Everything"	3:11

Rdio bonus track
No.	Title	Length
12.	"Fourth Dimension"	3:10

LIGHTS store bonus track
No.	Title	Length
13.	"Everybody Breaks a Glass"	3:56

== Credits and personnel ==
Credits for Siberia Acoustic adapted from AllMusic.

Performance credits

- All vocals – Lights
  - Featured vocals – Owl City (Adam Young), Max Kerman, Coeur de Pirate

Instruments

- Cello – Kevin Fox
- Guitar – Lights
- Piano – Lights

Production

- Engineers – Jason Dufour, Stephen Koszler
  - Assistant engineers – Arthur Bastos, Jack Clow
- Mastering – João Carvalho
- Mixer – Jason Dufour
- Producer – Lights
- Songwriters – Brian Borcherdt, Jason Parsons, Lights Poxleitner, Thomas "Tawgs" Salter, Dave Thomson, Graham Walsh

Packaging

- Creative director – Lights
- Designer – Simon Paul
- Photographers – Tina Lok, Katie Rodriguez

== Charts ==
Chart (2013)	Peak position
Canadian Albums (Billboard)	7
US Billboard 200	86
US Independent Albums (Billboard)	20
US Vinyl Albums (Billboard)	8

== Release history ==
Country	Date	Format	Label	Catalog No.	Ref.
Canada	April 30, 2013	CD	Universal Music Canada	B00C3DIY9G	
Canada	April 30, 2013	Digital download	Universal Music Canada	—	
Canada	April 30, 2013	Vinyl (LP)	Universal Music Canada	B00CB6VT8S	
United States	April 30, 2013	CD	Last Gang Records	B00BR0SGZ8	
United States	April 30, 2013	Digital download	Last Gang Records	—	
United States	May 28, 2013	Vinyl (LP)	Last Gang Records	B00BR0SEJ6	
