= Cactus in the Valley =

Single by Lights featuring Owl City

from the album Siberia Acoustic
- Released: March 15, 2013
- Studio: Revolution Recording (Toronto, ON)
- Length: 3:22
- Label: Universal; Last Gang
- Songwriter: Lights Poxleitner
- Producer: Poxleitner

Lights singles chronology
"Timing Is Everything" (2012)	"Cactus in the Valley" (2013)	"Up We Go" (2014)

Owl City singles chronology
"Good Time" (2012)	"Cactus in the Valley" (2013)	"Beautiful Times" (2014)

Music video
- "Cactus in the Valley" (lyric video) on YouTube

"Cactus in the Valley" is a song by Canadian singer-songwriter named Lights. It was released on March 15, 2013, as the lead single from her second acoustic album, Siberia Acoustic. The song features American electronica artist, Owl City.

== Background and composition ==
"Cactus in the Valley" was originally written and produced by Lights for her second studio album, Siberia. On March 5, 2013, Lights announced that she would be releasing her second acoustic album, Siberia Acoustic on April 30. Along with this announcement, a re-recording of "Cactus in the Valley" was released on March 15 as the lead single. The song was made available for streaming on USA Today on March 18.

== Critical reception ==
"Cactus in the Valley" was met with generally positive reviews from music critics. Brent Faulkner of PopMatters stated, "Lights continues to deliver, exhibiting a lovely vocal tone. Owl City's vocals are most surprising; rarely has Adam Young sounded so smooth. The vocal blend between the two is superb." Buzznet complimented how "lovely," Young and Poxleitner's voices blend together. Claire Louise Sheridan of Alter the Press! remarked, "With the help of Adam Young, aka Owl City, the already ballad-like 'Cactus in the Valley' is transformed into a harmonious duet full of intrigue and wonder. The melody of the piano combines beautifully with the almost ethereal tone of Lights' voice to create nothing short of a work of art."

== Chart performance ==
"Cactus in the Valley" debuted and peaked at number nine on the UK Cross Rhythms Weekly Chart. On the week of March 25 to March 31, 2013, the song reached number seven on the Spotify Viral Chart's Top 10.

== Charts ==
Chart performance for "Cactus in the Valley"
Chart (2014)	Peak position
UK Cross Rhythms Weekly Chart	9

== Release history ==
Release formats and dates for "Cactus in the Valley"
Region	Date	Format	Label	Ref.
Various	March 15, 2013	Digital download	Universal; Last Gang	
United Kingdom	March 19, 2013	CD	Universal; Last Gang	
