= Pep (album) =

2022 studio album by Lights

Studio album by Lights
- Released: April 1, 2022
- Studios: Starry Night (Mission); NYG (Vancouver); Studio America (Los Angeles); Hideaway (Studio City); Rancho Pagzilla (North Hollywood); Tyler's apartment (Los Angeles); Calimali (Los Angeles)
- Genre: Alternative rock
- Length: 43:10
- Label: Fueled by Ramen
- Producers: Dylan Bauld; Jaco Caraco; Tommy English; Lights; Tim Pagnotta

Lights chronology
Dead End (2020)	Pep (2022)	Warehouse Summer (2022)

Singles from Pep
- 1. "Prodigal Daughter" Released: October 20, 2021; 2. "Real Thing" Released: December 24, 2021; 3. "Salt and Vinegar" Released: February 4, 2022; 4. "In My Head" Released: March 17, 2022; 5. "Okay Okay" Released: April 1, 2022

Pep (stylized as PƎP) is the fifth studio album by Canadian singer-songwriter Lights. It was released on April 1, 2022, on Fueled by Ramen and is her first studio album under the label (not counting Skin & Earth Acoustic). Like her previous album, Skin & Earth, the album was accompanied by a comic, titled The Clinic, which is a side story to the Skin & Earth comic.

The album debuted at number 32 on the Canadian Albums Chart, being her first album not to break the top 10, as well as her first album to not enter the Billboard 200, but it did peak at number 25 on the Top Album Sales chart.

== Background ==
In an interview with AltPress, Lights stated she started writing the songs around 2019, but once the COVID-19 pandemic struck, she wanted the album to be more positive, which was inspired by her mental health worsening during that time. Because it was her first album released through Fueled by Ramen, she revealed being on the label influenced her to make the album with less of a pop sound like her previous albums and have more of a rock and alt style.

Lights said tying this album in with a comic book was because she wanted to continue the story of Skin & Earth, which she claimed was still not finished. When talking about The Clinic, she claimed the comic is "a metaphor for music. We use music to get away, to escape from our realities. The Clinic is a big metaphor for an album."

== Promotion ==
Lights released the single "Prodigal Daughter" on October 20, 2021, along with the first part of an accompanying comic book, The Clinic, which is a side story to her previous comic Skin & Earth. Not too long after, she announced the Baby I'm Back tour in North America. The second single, "Real Thing", which featured Los Angeles-based musician Elohim, was released on December 24, 2021. On February 4, 2022, the third single, "Salt and Vinegar", was released as well as the official announcement of the album. On March 17, 2022, the fourth single, "In My Head", featuring Twenty One Pilots drummer Josh Dun was released.

== Reception ==
Pep ratings
Review scores
Source	Rating
AllMusic	4.5/5 stars
Clash	6/10
The Spill Magazine	4.5/5 stars
Under the Radar	8/10

AllMusic rated the album 4.5 stars, writing "Lights has leveled up, delivering a potent, lyrically mature, and musically colorful production that balances her empowered feminism with a sleek, take-no-prisoners pop aesthetic."

== Track listing ==
Pep track listing
No.	Title	Writer(s)	Producer(s)	Length
1.	"Beside Myself"	Lights Poxleitner-Bokan	Lights	4:11
2.	"In My Head" (featuring Josh Dun)	Poxleitner-Bokan; Michelle Buzz; Thomas Schleiter	Tommy English; Dylan Bauld^{[a]}	3:08
3.	"Prodigal Daughter"	Poxleitner-Bokan	Tim Pagnotta; Lights^{[c]}	2:55
4.	"Salt and Vinegar"	Poxleitner-Bokan	Pagnotta; Lights^{[c]}	3:15
5.	"Money in the Bag" (featuring Kiesza)	Poxleitner-Bokan; Kiesa Ellestad; Jenna Andrews	Lights	2:44
6.	"Jaws"	Poxleitner-Bokan	Lights	3:17
7.	"Rent"	Poxleitner-Bokan	Lights	3:26
8.	"Sparky"	Poxleitner-Bokan	Pagnotta; Lights^{[c]}	3:27
9.	"Real Thing" (featuring Elohim)	Poxleitner-Bokan; Elohim; Jaco Caraco	Caraco; Lights	3:05
10.	"Easy Money"	Poxleitner-Bokan; Dylan Bauld	Bauld; Lights^{[c]}	3:26
11.	"Okay Okay"	Poxleitner-Bokan; Bauld	Bauld	3:20
12.	"Voices Carry"	Poxleitner-Bokan; Bauld	Bauld; Lights^{[c]}	3:39
13.	"Grip"	Poxleitner-Bokan; Bauld	Bauld	3:10
Total length:				43:10

Lights Webstore Edition
No.	Title	Length
14.	"Prodigal Daughter (Chill Version)"	4:00
Total length:		47:10

=== Notes ===
- ^{^[c]} signifies a co-producer
- ^{^[a]} signifies an additional producer

== Personnel ==
Credits adapted from the album's liner notes.

- Lights – performance, creative direction, layout, illustrations
- Nick Rad – mixing (tracks 1–10, 12)
- Dylan Bauld – mixing (11–13), performance (10–13)
- Emily Lazar – mastering
- Elsa Paengsang – engineering (1, 6)
- Jess Bowen – performance (1)
- Josh Dun – performance (2)
- Kiesza – performance (5)
- Elohim – performance (9)
- Jaco Caraco – performance (9)
- Matt Barnes – photos
- Lindsey Blane – additional photography
- Virgilio Tzaj – layout

== Charts ==
Chart (2022)	Peak position
Canadian Albums (Billboard)	32
US Top Album Sales (Billboard)	25

== Ded ==
Ded

Studio album by Lights
- Released: April 7, 2023
- Genre: Chillwave
- Length: 55:40
- Label: Fueled by Ramen

Lights chronology
Warehouse Summer (2022)	Ded (2023)	A6 (2025)

Singles from Ded
- 1. "Voices Carry (Ded version)" Released: March 24, 2023

In March 2023, Lights announced a slowed-down version of the album, titled Ded (stylized as dEd), which was released on April 7. It includes all the songs from Pep in reverse order.

=== Track listing ===
No.	Title	Writer(s)	Length
1.	"Grip (Ded Version)"	Lights; Dylan Bauld	3:45
2.	"Voices Carry (Ded Version)"	Lights; Bauld	4:27
3.	"Okay Okay (Ded Version)"	Lights; Bauld	5:10
4.	"Easy Money (Ded Version)"	Lights; Bauld	4:14
5.	"Real Thing (Ded Version)" (featuring Elohim)	Lights; Elohim; Jaco	3:52
6.	"Sparky (Ded Version)"	Lights	4:45
7.	"Rent (Ded Version)"	Lights	3:54
8.	"Jaws (Ded Version)"	Lights	4:01
9.	"Money in the Bag (Ded Version)" (featuring Kiesza)	Lights; Kiesza; Jenna Andrews	4:39
10.	"Salt and Vinegar (Ded Version)"	Lights	4:12
11.	"Prodigal Daughter (Ded Version)"	Lights	4:01
12.	"In My Head (Ded Version)"	Lights; Michelle Buzz; Tommy English	4:22
13.	"Beside Myself (Ded Version)"	Lights	4:45
Total length:			55:40
