= Fire (Autumn Hill song) =

Single by Autumn Hill

from the album Favourite Mistake
- Released: August 20, 2013
- Genre: Country pop
- Length: 3:59
- Label: Wax
- Songwriters: Tareya Green; Jamie Appleby; Alyssa Reid
- Producer: Tawgs Salter

Autumn Hill singles chronology
"Can't Keep Waiting" (2013)	"Fire" (2013)	"If She Wants This Town" (2013)

"Fire" is a song recorded by Canadian country music duo Autumn Hill for their debut studio album, Favourite Mistake (2013). The song was written by Tareya Green of Autumn Hill, Jamie Appleby, and Alyssa Reid. It was released through Wax Records as the third single from the album on August 20, 2013. "Fire" topped the Canadian Country Singles Sales Chart for the week ending August 28, 2013.

== Content ==
"Fire" is a guitar-driven country pop ballad about heartbreak. The song tells the story of a self-destructive relationship that gets symbolically set on fire.

== Critical reception ==
In their review of Favourite Mistake, CBC Music responded positively to "Fire", which they noted "sparkles with spirited energy".

== Music video ==
A music video was filmed for "Fire", directed by Marc André Debruyne, and debuted on September 11, 2013.

== Chart performance ==
"Fire" debuted at #73 on the Canadian Hot 100 for the week ending September 7, 2013.

Chart (2013)	Peak position
Canada Hot 100 (Billboard)	73
Canada AC (Billboard)	38
Canada Country (Billboard)	22
