= Little Machines =

Studio album by Lights
- Released: September 19, 2014
- Recorded: 2013 – March 2, 2014
- Studios: Drew Yeah Studios (Los Angeles, CA); Greenhouse Studios (Vancouver, CA); Mixsuite Studio (UK); Westlake Recording Studios (Hollywood, CA)
- Genre: Electropop
- Length: 38:33; 50:09 (with bonus tracks)
- Label: Warner Bros.
- Producers: Lights; Drew Pearson; Thomas "Tawgs" Salter

Lights chronology
Siberia Acoustic (2013)	Little Machines (2014)	Midnight Machines (2016)

Singles from Little Machines
- 1. "Up We Go" Released: July 22, 2014; 2. "Running with the Boys" Released: January 26, 2015

Professional ratings
Review scores
Source	Rating
Allmusic	3.5/5 stars
Popmatters	4/10
Rock Sound	7/10

Little Machines is the third studio album by Canadian electropop singer-songwriter Lights, released on September 19, 2014, through Warner Bros. Records. It was preceded in July 2014 by the release of its lead single "Up We Go", which debuted on the Canadian Hot 100 at number 84. In October 2014, Little Machines debuted on the Canadian Albums Chart at number five, and on the US Billboard 200 at number 34. The album sold 8,500 copies in its first week in Canada. On March 15, 2015, Little Machines won Pop Album of the Year at the 2015 Juno Awards. The album title comes from a lyric in the song "Running with the Boys".

== Background ==
After promoting the acoustic version of her second studio album, Siberia, in 2013, Lights returned to the studio to work on new material. On Little Machines, Lights was inspired by bold female artists including Björk, Kate Bush, and Patti Smith, while also wanting to remain accessible. Critics have noted the more lighthearted nature of lead single "Up We Go" in comparison to the grittier, more experimental dubstep-pop of Siberia, which is indicative of the sonic direction of the album as a whole.

In an interview with Billboard, Lights explained that while she felt like taking risks on Siberia, Little Machines was more about creating great "incredible songs that everyone can sing along to and lyrically latch onto" and then putting them together as an album. Working with producer Drew Pearson and Mark "Spike" Stent, Lights captured a "timeless electronic sound" and found herself lyrically gravitating towards themes of nostalgia and naivety. Lights has described the album as "a triumph after a hard dry spell" and "a complete journey, from front to back", noting that during the recording process she found herself "[turning] to poetry, art and female songwriting legends ... and just enjoying [herself] again."

Lights recorded the album while pregnant with her first child and noted that for certain songs she had to alter the way she sang due to her diaphragm muscles tightening. She recorded the vocals to the song "Muscle Memory" while in the early stages of labor which required her to take multiple breaks.

== Promotion ==
Little Machines was made available for pre-order on July 22, 2014, with lead single "Up We Go" also available for purchase at that time. The announcement came after a ten-day countdown on Lights' official social media pages. To promote the album, Lights toured in the US during the fall, starting October 24 in Portland, Maine.

=== Singles ===
"Up We Go" was released to digital retailers and Canadian radio on July 22, 2014. It was serviced to modern rock radio in the United States on September 9. It debuted at No. 84 on the Billboard Canadian Hot 100 for the week of August 9, and at No. 42 on the Canada CHR/Top 40 airplay chart for the week of September 13. The official music video premiered September 3.

"Running with the Boys" was released as the second countdown single on September 9, 2014. It was subsequently serviced to Canadian radio in January 2015 as the second official single off the album. The music video debuted January 30, 2015.

=== Other songs ===
- "Portal" was released to iTunes as the first countdown single on August 12, 2014, along with an official music video that premiered the same day.
- "Same Sea" was released January 19, 2015 as the third promotional single off the album, with the K.Flay Remix premiering that day.

== Track listing ==
No.	Title	Writer(s)	Length
1.	"Portal"	Lights Poxleitner	4:28
2.	"Running with the Boys"	Poxleitner; Drew Pearson	4:12
3.	"Up We Go"	Poxleitner; Thomas Salter	2:51
4.	"Same Sea"	Poxleitner; Salter; Jason "Human Kebab" Parsons	3:28
5.	"Speeding"	Poxleitner; Pearson	3:27
6.	"Muscle Memory"	Poxleitner; Pearson	3:37
7.	"Oil and Water"	Poxleitner; Salter	3:12
8.	"Slow Down"	Poxleitner; Salter	3:24
9.	"Meteorites"	Poxleitner; Salter	3:22
10.	"How We Do It"	Poxleitner	3:05
11.	"Don't Go Home Without Me"	Poxleitner	3:27
Total length:			38:33

Deluxe version bonus tracks
No.	Title	Writer(s)	Length
12.	"Child"	Poxleitner; Pearson	3:49
13.	"Lucky Ones" (featuring Beau Bokan)	Poxleitner	3:36
14.	"From All Sides"	Poxleitner; Pearson	4:11
Total length:			50:09

== Personnel ==
Credits and personnel for Little Machines:

- Matt Barnes - photography
- Beau Bokan - vocals (track 13)
- Joäh Carvalho - mastering
- Jeff Fenster - A&R
- Maurie Kaufmann - drums
- Lights - vocals (all tracks), bass, composer, creative director, drum programming, guitar, synthesizer
- Blake Mares - assistant engineer
- Pherbie Midgely - assistant engineer
- Jay "Human Kebab" Parsons - composer, programming
- Ashley Poitevin - marketing
- Thomas "Tawgs" Salter - additional production, bass, composer, guitar, producer, synthesizer
- Spike Stent - mixing
- Alex Tenta - design and layout
- Adam Weaver - synthesizer

== Charts ==
=== Weekly charts ===
Weekly chart performance for Little Machines
Chart (2014)	Peak position
Canadian Albums (Billboard)	5
US Billboard 200	34

== Certifications ==
Certifications and sales for Little Machines
Region	Certification	Certified units/sales
Canada (Music Canada)	Gold	40,000^{^}
^{^} Shipments figures based on certification alone.

== Release history ==
Release dates for Little Machines
Country	Date	Format	Label	Ref.
Australia	September 19, 2014	Standard · Deluxe	Warner Bros. Records	
Ireland	September 19, 2014	Standard · Deluxe	Warner Bros. Records	
New Zealand	September 19, 2014	Standard · Deluxe	Warner Bros. Records	
United Kingdom	September 22, 2014	Standard · Deluxe	Warner Bros. Records	
Canada	September 23, 2014	Standard · Deluxe	LIGHTS Music · Universal Music Canada	
United States	September 23, 2014	Standard · Deluxe	Warner Bros. Records	
