= Can't Keep Waiting =

Single by Autumn Hill

from the album Favourite Mistake
- Released: April 9, 2013
- Genre: Country; country pop
- Length: 3:11
- Label: Wax
- Songwriter(s): Mike Robins · Tareya Green; Jamie Appleby; Alyssa Reid
- Producer(s): David Thomson; Tawgs Salter

Autumn Hill singles chronology
"Anything At All" (2012)	"Can't Keep Waiting" (2013)	"Fire" (2013)

"Can't Keep Waiting" is a song recorded by Canadian country music duo Autumn Hill for their debut studio album, Favourite Mistake (2013). The song was written by group members Mike Robins and Tareya Green along with Jamie Appleby and Alyssa Reid, while production was handled by Dave "Dwave" Thomson and Thomas "Tawgs" Salter. It was released through Wax Records as the second single from the album on April 9, 2013.

Alyssa Reid recorded an acoustic cover of the song for her third studio album, Phoenix (2015).

== Content ==
The song's lyrics depict a narrator who has grown frustrated with hoping somebody will feel a certain way about them and insists they "can't keep waiting" for it to happen.

== Music video ==
The accompanying music video was directed by Marc André Debruyne and premiered April 29, 2013.

== Chart performance ==
Chart (2013)	Peak position
Canada Country (Billboard)	19
