= Favourite Mistake =

Album by Autumn Hill

Studio album by Autumn Hill
- Released: September 10, 2013
- Genre: Country
- Label: Wax
- Producer: Tawgs Salter, Dave Thomson, Jamie Appleby

Autumn Hill chronology
| Favourite Mistake (2013) | Anchor (2015) |

Singles from Favourite Mistake
- 1. "Anything At All" Released: October 30, 2012; 2. "Can't Keep Waiting" Released: April 9, 2013; 3. "Fire" Released: August 20, 2013; 4. "If She Wants This Town" Released: January 2014

Favourite Mistake is the debut studio album by Canadian country music duo Autumn Hill. It was preceded by three singles, including lead single "Anything At All", which peaked at 79 on the Canadian Hot 100, and "Fire", which peaked at 73. The album was released September 10, 2013 through Wax Records.

== Reception ==
In CBC Music's biography of Autumn Hill, the network praised the "compelling stories of loss and love" told through the songs on the album, as well as the duo's "surprising depths" as artists. "Some songs sink in right away," the article reads, "while others sink in over time and won't let you go. Autumn Hill's music does both."

== Track listing ==
| No. | Title | Writer(s) | Length |
|---|---|---|---|
| 1. | "Can't Keep Waiting" | Mike Robins, Tareya Green, Jamie Appleby, Alyssa Reid | 3:11 |
| 2. | "If She Wants This Town" | Pete Sallis, Kris Bergsnes, Emily Shackleton | 3:37 |
| 3. | "Anything At All" | David Thomson, Heather Morgan | 3:43 |
| 4. | "Spaceman" | Jason Levine, Susan Cagie, Green, Robins, Jesse Labelle, Appleby, Thomas Salter | 3:55 |
| 5. | "Fire" | Green, Appleby, Reid | 4:00 |
| 6. | "Something To Remember You By" | Green, Robins, Thomson, Jake Matthews | 3:26 |
| 7. | "Favourite Mistake" | Green, Robins | 3:12 |
| 8. | "Battle Scars" | Green, Robins | 3:50 |
| 9. | "Anything At All" (Acoustic) | Thomson, Morgan | 3:37 |

== Chart performance ==
=== Singles ===
| Year | Single | Peak chart positions | | | |
| Year | Single | CAN Country | CAN | CAN AC | CAN Hot AC |
|---|---|---|---|---|---|
| 2012 | "Anything At All" | 12 | 79 | 30 | 37 |
| 2013 | "Can't Keep Waiting" | 19 | — | — | — |
| 2013 | "Fire" | 22 | 73 | 38 | — |
| 2014 | "If She Wants This Town" | 24 | — | — | — |
"—" denotes releases that did not chart
