= Anchor (Autumn Hill album) =

Studio album by Autumn Hill
- Released: June 16, 2015
- Recorded: 2014–15 Various studios: House of Blues (Nashville, Tennessee); The Zoo (Nashville, Tennessee); Song Rimes Studio (Nashville, Tennessee); Soundstage Studio (Nashville, Tennessee); Coalition (Toronto, Ontario); The Lab and Bluemanrecording (Nashville, Tennessee); GRC Audio (Buffalo, New York)
- Genre: Country
- Label: Wax
- Producer: David "Dwave" Thomson; Lindsay Rimes; Nathan Meckel; Tareya Green

Autumn Hill chronology
Favourite Mistake (2013)	Anchor (2015)

Singles from Anchor
- 1. "Blame" Released: March 3, 2015; 2. "Return Policy" Released: August 31, 2015; 3. "Mixtape" Released: January 27, 2016; 4. "Good Night for Going Nowhere" Released: May 18, 2016

Anchor is the second studio album by Canadian country music duo Autumn Hill, released on June 16, 2015 via Wax Records and distributed by Universal Music Canada. Its lead single, "Blame", became their first song to reach the top five on the Billboard Canada Country chart.

== Background ==
Their debut studio album, Favourite Mistake, was released in 2013 and produced four country airplay hits. With "Anything at All" charting at both the adult contemporary and country formats, the duo earned the distinction of being the first Canadian country music act to crossover to pop radio since Shania Twain. Produced by Dave Thomson, Anchor was co-written by Autumn Hill and songwriters from Nashville, Tennessee. After touring with Kira Isabella in late 2014, the duo sought to move away from the ballad-heavy approach of their previous record and "focus on songs that would translate to our live shows," according to member Mike Robins.

== Promotion ==
"Blame" was released on March 3, 2015 as the album's lead single. The music video premiered the same date. It failed to enter the Billboard Canadian Hot 100, but reached a peak position of 4 on the Canada Country airplay chart, marking the duo's first top five hit.

"Return Policy" was released to Canadian country radio on August 31, 2015 as the second official single.

The album's third single, "Mixtape", was serviced to radio on January 27, 2016.

The album's fourth single, "Good Night for Going Nowhere" released to Canadian country radio on May 18, 2016.

=== Other songs ===
During the lead-up to the album's release, three tracks were released to iTunes as promotional singles supporting pre-orders: "It Don't Get Better Than This" premiered June 3, 2015; "Summertime Free" premiered June 5, 2015; and "Return Policy" premiered June 8, 2015.

== Track listing ==
No.	Title	Writer(s)	Producer(s)	Length
1.	"Anchor"	Tareya Green, Mike Robins, David "Dwave" Thomson	Thomson	3:32
2.	"Return Policy"	Green, Robins, Lindsay Rimes	Rimes, Thomson	3:01
3.	"It Don't Get Better Than This"	Green, Robins, Thomson, Phil Barton	Thomson	3:10
4.	"Blame"	Thomson, Stephanie Chapman, Christian Rada	Thomson	3:42
5.	"Mixtape"	Thomson, Chapman, Rada	Thomson	3:29
6.	"Memphis"	Green, Robins, Kris Bergsnes	Rimes, Thomson	2:53
7.	"Good Night for Going Nowhere"	Green, Robins, Todd Clark, Gavin Slate	Thomson	4:06
8.	"Summertime Free"	Matt Rogers, Jason Massey, John King	Thomson	3:39
9.	"August in the Rain" (Mike Robins solo)	Robins, Nathan Meckel, Blue Miller	Thomson, Meckel	5:26
10.	"Never Be Mine" (Tareya Green solo)	Green	Green, Thomson	3:28

== Credits and personnel ==
Credits adapted from liner notes.

Recorded and engineered at

- Buffalo, New York (GCR Audio)
- Nashville, Tennessee (House of Blues, The Lab and Bluemanrecording, Song Rimes Studio, Soundstage Studio, The Zoo)
- Toronto, Ontario (Coalition)

Performance credits

- All vocals – Autumn Hill (Tareya Green, Mike Robins)
  - Background vocals – Doug DeLuca, Nathan Meckel, Lindsay Rimes, Ethan Roberts, David Thomson

Instruments

- Banjo – Lindsay Rimes, Derek Wells
- Bass – Luis Espaillat, Mike Rinney, David Thomson, Nolan Verner
- Bouzouki – David Thomson
- Cello – David Thomson
- Drums – Matt King
- Fiddle – Zach Renquist
- Guitars (acoustic and electric) – Tim Galloway, Rob McNelley, Blue Miller, Justin Ostrander, Lindsay Rimes, Mike Robins, David Thomson, Derek Wells
- Keyboards and piano – Jamie Appleby, Nathan Meckel, David Thomson, Chris Tuttle
- Lap steel and slide guitars – David Thomson, Derek Wells
- Mandolin – Tim Galloway, Lindsay Rimes
- Percussion – Matt King

Production

- Art director – Tareya Green
- Engineers – Brad Hill, Brad Lauchert, Nathan Meckel, Mark Niemiec Lindsay Rimes, David Thomson
  - Assistant engineers – Tom Freitag
- Management – Alex Seif Union Entertainment Group
- Mastering – Phil Demetro
- Mixers – Jeff Dalziel, Billy Decker, David Thomson, Miles Walker
  - Assistant mixer – Ryan Jumper
- Packaging designer – Tareya Green
- Photographer – Matt Barnes
- Record producer – Tareya Green, Nathan Meckel, Lindsay Rimes, David Thomson
- Programming – Nathan Meckel, Lindsay Rimes, David Thomson
- Songwriters – Phil Barton, Kris Bergsnes, Stephanie Chapman, Todd Clark, Tareya Green, John King, Jason Massey, Nathan Meckel, Blue Miller, Christian Rada, Lindsay Rimes, Mike Robins, Matt Rogers, Gavin Slate, David Thomson

== Chart performance ==
=== Singles ===
Year	Single	Peak chart positions
Year	Single	CAN Country
2015	"Blame"	4
2015	"Return Policy"	22
2016	"Mixtape"	19
2016	"Good Night for Going Nowhere"	—
