= A6 (album) =

2025 album by Lights

Studio album by Lights
- Released: May 2, 2025
- Studios: Starry Night Studios, Mission, British Columbia
- Length: 44:50
- Label: Lights Music Inc.
- Producer: Lights

Lights chronology
Ded (2023)	A6 (2025)

Singles from A6
- 1. "Damage" Released: September 27, 2024; 2. "Alive Again" Released: February 7, 2025; 3. "Surface Tension" / "White Paper Palm Trees" Released: April 4, 2025; 4. "Clingy" Released: April 30, 2025

A6Extended

Singles from A6Extended
- 1. "Education" Released: September 19, 2025; 2. "Learning to Let Go" Released: November 7, 2025; 3. "Come Get Your Girl" Released: January 28, 2026

A6 is the sixth studio album by Canadian singer-songwriter Lights. The album was released independently on May 2, 2025 and follows her fifth album Pep (2022) and its re-imagined version, Ded (2023). Five singles with music videos were released in promotion of the album, and embarked on the (A)live Again and Come Get Your Girl Tours in 2025 and 2026 respectively.

An extended version, titled A6Extended, was released on January 30, 2026 containing eight additional songs, with "Education", "Learning to Let Go", and "Come Get Your Girl" released as singles.

== Background ==
As her first independently released album, A6 was also the first album where Lights played almost every instrument on and produced every track. This made the album very personal for her. She further explained the background of the album in an interview with Songwriter Universe:

A6 is effectively album six, but it also represents a journey and all the things that I’ve learned and gone through in the last 16 years of my career. I can look back and take all the things I’ve learned through the hard times and the good times, and put it into this feeling. It’s a very very feeling-based record...a self-exploratory look...you look at yourself inwardly and be able to recognize where all the past things have taken you, and being proud of that person.

— Lights

== Critical reception ==
A6 received positive reviews from critics. Matt Collar of AllMusic gave the album a 3.5 out of 5 star-rating and wrote that "At the center of A6's black lipstick-stained, glitter-goth atmosphere is Poxleitner with her throaty coo, sounding as vulnerable and utterly in charge as ever." He praised the songs "Surface Tension", "Alive Again", "Damage", and "White Paper Palm Trees".

== Track listing ==
All tracks are written and produced by Valerie Poxleitner as well as Brodie Tavares as writer on tracks 4, 10, and 11.

A6 track listing
No.	Title	Length
1.	"Intro"	0:14
2.	"Damage"	3:21
3.	"Alive Again"	3:41
4.	"Surface Tension"	3:30
5.	"You're Killing Me"	3:41
6.	"White Paper Palm Trees"	3:40
7.	"Ghost Girl On First"	3:29
8.	"Take It Easy"	3:25
9.	"Drinks On the Coast"	3:17
10.	"Clingy"	3:24
11.	"The Other Side of the Door"	4:17
12.	"Piranha"	4:42
13.	"Day Two"	4:09
Total length:		44:50

A6Extended track listing
No.	Title	Length
14.	"Education"	3:50
15.	"Come Get Your Girl"	3:41
16.	"Love Is a Game"	3:44
17.	"The City Is Falling"	3:45
18.	"This Time Tmrw"	4:07
19.	"Learning to Let Go"	3:16
20.	"Final Round"	3:43
21.	"Angelina"	2:53

- All song titles are stylized all caps.
- "Ghost Girl On First" is listed as "All Or Nothing" on physical editions of A6Extended.

== Personnel ==
Musicians
- Lights - vocals
- Brodie Tavares - guitar, bass, drum programming
- Stefan Tavares - drums, drum programming (tracks 2, 3, 4)
Production
- Lights – production, engineering
- Pat DiCenso – mixing engineer
- Idania Valencia – mastering engineer
