= Giants (Lights song) =

Single by Lights

from the album Skin & Earth
- Released: July 24, 2017
- Studio: Mick Schultz Studio (Los Angeles, CA)
- Genre: Pop, power pop
- Length: 3:16
- Label: Warner Bros.
- Songwriters: Lights; Iain James; Mick Schultz
- Producer: Mick Schultz

Lights singles chronology
"Running with the Boys" (2015)	"Giants" (2017)	"We Were Here" (2018)

"Giants" is a song recorded by Canadian singer and songwriter Lights for her fourth studio album, Skin & Earth. Lights co-wrote the song with Iain James and the track's producer, Mick Schultz. It was released on June 23, 2017 as the album's lead single. "Giants" was serviced to American hot adult contemporary radio on July 24, 2017. In January 2018, four new versions of the song, recorded in Japanese, French, Spanish and Tagalog, were released.

== Content ==
The title and hook for the song were inspired by a phrase featured on British currency: "And we will ride on the shoulders of giants." The chorus and verses for the song were developed separately and are set to different tempos; according to Lights, this created a "challenging structure" to deal with, but the writers were determined to mesh the two parts.

== Chart performance ==
"Giants" debuted at number 41 on the Canada Hot AC chart dated August 12, 2017 and has since reached a peak of 14. "Giants" also debuted at number 39 on the Billboard Adult Pop Songs chart dated August 19, 2017. This made it Lights' first song to chart in the United States.

== Music video ==
The accompanying music video for "Giants" was directed by Jeremy Schaulin-Rioux and premiered June 23, 2017. It takes place in the dystopian world created for the Skin & Earth comic series connected with the album, and introduces characters and events that takes place in the series' fifth issue. In the video, Lights plays En, the protagonist from her Skin & Earth comics, as she meets a mysterious being and is transported to another dimension.

== Charts ==
Chart (2017–18)	Peak position
Canada AC (Billboard)	18
Canada Hot AC (Billboard)	14
US Adult Pop Airplay (Billboard)	18

== Release history ==
Country	Date	Format	Label	Ref.
Worldwide	June 23, 2017	Digital download	Warner Bros.	
United States	July 24, 2017	Hot adult contemporary	Warner Bros.	
