= Blame (Autumn Hill song) =

Single by Autumn Hill

from the album Anchor
- Released: March 3, 2015
- Recorded: November 2014; The Zoo (Nashville, TN); Coalition (Toronto, Ontario)
- Genre: Country; country pop
- Length: 3:40
- Label: Wax
- Songwriter(s): Dave Thomson; Stephanie Chapman; Christian Rada
- Producer(s): Dave Thomson

Autumn Hill singles chronology
"Karolina" (2014)	"Blame" (2015)	"Return Policy" (2015)

Music video
- "Blame" on YouTube

"Blame" is a song recorded by Canadian country music duo Autumn Hill for their second studio album, Anchor (2015). It was released to digital retailers through Wax Records as the album's lead single on March 3, 2015, and officially impacted Canadian country radio on April 23, 2015. "Blame" debuted at number 49 on the Billboard Canada Country airplay chart, and later became the group's first top-five hit.

== Background and composition ==
"Blame" is a country song written by Dave Thomson, Stephanie Chapman, and Christian Rada. Its instrumentation features guitar and banjo, with a syncopated vocal arrangement. The song incorporates elements of pop music in its production. Its lyrics discuss the destructive effects that laying blame can have on a relationship.

One of the last songs chosen for the album, "Blame" was recorded in Nashville, TN in November 2014. The duo debuted the song during their 2014-15 Shake It If Ya Got It tour with Kira Isabella. They promoted the single through their social media accounts in January and February 2015 using the hashtags "#AH2" and "#Blame" before announcing the release date on February 26, 2015. The song was officially released to digital retailers on March 3, 2015.

== Music video ==
A lyric video for the song premiered March 3, 2015 on the group's official YouTube channel. It was selected as the "Pick of the Week" by Canadian country music blog Top Country. The official music video, directed by Aaron A, was filmed in February 2015 and premiered March 27, 2015 exclusively through CMT Canada. It was uploaded to the group's YouTube channel on April 6, 2015.

== Chart performance ==
Chart (2015)	Peak position
Canada Country (Billboard)	4

== Release history ==
List of release dates, showing release format and reference
Country	Date	Format	Label	Ref.
Canada	March 3, 2015	Digital download	Wax Records	
Canada	April 23, 2015	Country radio	Wax Records	
United States	November 27, 2015	Digital download	Wax Records	
