= Autumn Hill =

Canadian country music duo

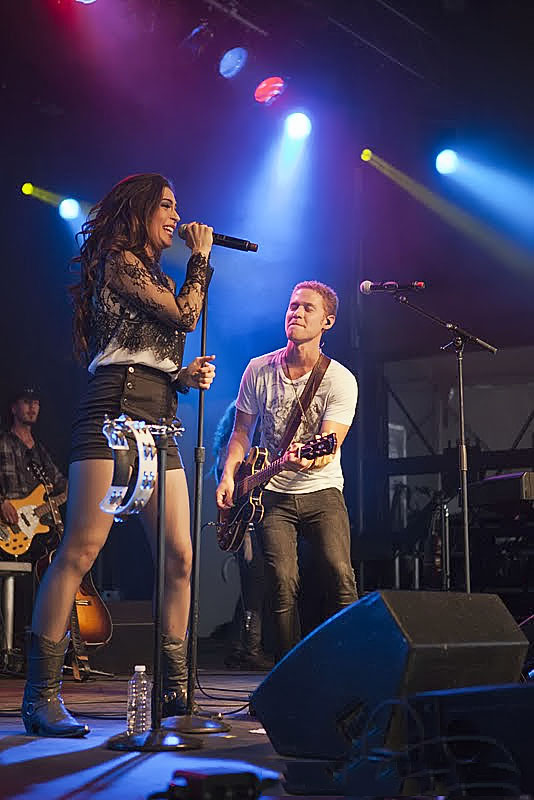
- Autumn Hill performing at Boots and Hearts Music Festival 2013

Background information
- Origin: Canada
- Genres: Country
- Years active: 2012–2017
- Label: Wax Records
- Members: Mike Robins; Tareya Green
- Website: http://autumnhillmusic.com/ (defunct)

Autumn Hill was a Canadian country music duo composed of Mike Robins (from Toronto, Ontario) and Tareya Green (from Calgary, Alberta).

== History ==
Green studied multi-media at Southern Alberta Institute of Technology in Calgary, Alberta and was developing websites for entertainers, but she was a songwriter and pianist and began posting performances on YouTube, where Wax Records co-founder Jamie Appleby discovered her. In January 2012, she moved to Toronto, where Appleby brought in several songwriters to co-write what was meant to be her first album. One of those songwriters was Mike Robins. Robins was an established singer/songwriter who had spent 2010 touring with Hope Sandoval then had his 2011 solo single "No Mercy" top the adult contemporary chart on iHeartRadio. When Appleby heard the two singing together, he saw their potential as a duet and Autumn Hill was born.

Their debut single, "Anything At All," entered the Canadian Hot 100 in January 2013. It is included on their debut album Favourite Mistake, released September 10, 2013. With two of their singles gaining substantial airplay on both country and adult contemporary formats, the pair were touted as the first Canadian country act since Shania Twain to successfully crossover to pop radio. The record's three subsequent singles experienced diminishing returns on the Canada Country airplay chart; the third single "Fire" became the group's highest-charting entry on the Canadian Hot 100 at number 73. "Blame" was released in March 2015 as the lead single for the group's second and final album, Anchor. Reaching a peak position of four on the Canadian country airplay chart, it remains the group's only top ten hit. In total, seven of their singles charted.

In 2017, at the end of their promotion for Anchor, the pair decided to split up and pursue solo careers.

Green adopted the mononym 'Tareya' and released her debut solo single, "Summer Wheels", in June 2017. In March 2018, she released her debut album, Stained Glass Heart. Robins co-founded the band East Adelaide and, in October 2020, released the solo single "Lightning Don’t Strike Twice".

== Discography ==
=== Studio albums ===
Title	Details
Favourite Mistake	Release date: September 10, 2013; Label: Wax Records
Anchor	Release date: June 16, 2015; Label: Wax Records

=== Singles ===
Year	Single	Peak chart positions				Album
Year	Single	CAN	CAN Country	CAN AC	CAN Hot AC	Album
2012	"Anything At All"	79	12	30	37	Favourite Mistake
2013	"Can't Keep Waiting"	—	19	—	—	Favourite Mistake
2013	"Fire"	73	22	38	—	Favourite Mistake
2014	"If She Wants This Town"	—	24	—	—	Favourite Mistake
2015	"Blame"	—	4	—	—	Anchor
2015	"Return Policy"	—	22	—	—	Anchor
2016	"Mixtape"	—	19	—	—	Anchor
2016	"Good Night for Going Nowhere"	—	—	—	—	Anchor
"—" denotes releases that did not chart

=== Christmas singles ===
Year	Single	Peak chart positions	Album
Year	Single	CAN AC	Album
2013	"It Ain't Christmas"	3	Now! Christmas 6
"—" denotes releases that did not chart

=== Guest singles ===
Year	Single	Artist	Album
2014	"Karolina"	Jann Arden	Everything Almost

=== Music videos ===
Year	Video	Director
2012	"Anything at All"	Margaret Malandruccolo
2013	"Can't Keep Waiting"	Marc André Debruyne
2013	"Fire"	Marc André Debruyne
2013	"It Ain't Christmas"	Joel Stewart
2014	"If She Wants This Town"	Joel Stewart
2014	"Karolina" (with Jann Arden)	Heidi Groff
2015	"Blame"	Aaron A
2015	"Return Policy"	

== Awards and nominations ==
Year	Association	Category	Nominated work	Result
2013	Canadian Country Music Association	Rising Star	—N/a	Nominated
2014	Juno Awards	Breakthrough Group of the Year	—N/a	Nominated
2014	Canadian Country Music Association	Group or Duo of the Year	—N/a	Nominated
2015	Canadian Country Music Association	Group or Duo of the Year	—N/a	Nominated
2016	Canadian Country Music Association	Group or Duo of the Year	—N/a	Nominated
2016	Juno Awards	Country Album of the Year	Anchor	Nominated
2017	Country Music Association of Ontario	Group or Duo of the Year	—N/a	Nominated
2017	Country Music Association of Ontario	Fan's Choice	—N/a	Nominated
