= Running with the Boys =

Single by Lights

from the album Little Machines
- Released: January 26, 2015
- Studio: Drew Yeah Studios (Los Angeles, CA)
- Genre: New wave
- Length: 4:12
- Label: LIGHTS Music; Warner Bros.
- Songwriters: Lights; Drew Pearson
- Producer: Drew Pearson

Lights singles chronology
"Up We Go" (2014)	"Running with the Boys" (2015)	"Giants" (2017)

"Running with the Boys" is a song recorded by Canadian electropop artist Lights for her third studio album, Little Machines (2014). It was co-written by Lights and the album's producer, Drew Pearson. The song was first released September 9, 2014 as the album's second countdown single through iTunes, and was later serviced to Canadian radio on January 26, 2015, as the second official single.

== Composition ==
"Running with the Boys" is a new wave-inspired song with a duration of four minutes and twelve seconds. Its instrumentation features prominent percussion beats, and additionally consists of synthesizers, guitars, and bass. The song's nostalgic lyrics express a feeling of freedom and "being a kid again," according to Lights.

== Music video ==
The video for "Running with the Boys" was directed by Amit Dabrai and was shot in Stouffville, Ontario. It premiered via MuchMusic on January 26, 2015, and was added to her Vevo account on January 30. Featuring the singer's real-life friends (Ryan Cain, Ashley Poitevin and Raina Douris), the video follows a group of young women through a day of reenacting typical childhood activities.

== Chart performance ==
Chart (2014)	Peak position
Hot Canadian Digital Songs (Billboard)	64
Chart (2015)	Peak position
Canada AC (Billboard)	36
Canada CHR/Top 40 (Billboard)	47
Canada Hot AC (Billboard)	35

== Credits and personnel ==
Credits adapted from Little Machines liner notes.

- Lights — vocals, synths, guitar, bass, drum programming, writing
- Drew Pearson — additional synths, guitar, bass, drum programming, production, engineering, writing
- Maurie Kaufmann — drums
- Spike Stent — mixing
- Pherbie Midgely, Blake Mares — engineering (assistant)
- João Carvalho — mastering

== Release history ==
Country	Date	Format	Label	Ref.
Canada	September 9, 2014	Digital download	LIGHTS Music	
United States	September 9, 2014	Digital download	Warner Bros. Records	
Canada	January 26, 2015	Contemporary hit radio	Warner Bros. Records	
Canada	January 26, 2015	Hot adult contemporary	Warner Bros. Records	
