= Mixtape (song) =

Single by Autumn Hill

from the album Anchor
- Released: January 27, 2016
- Genre: Country pop
- Length: 3:29
- Label: Wax
- Songwriter(s): David Thomson; Stephanie Chapman; Christian Rada
- Producer(s): Dave "Dwave" Thomson

Autumn Hill singles chronology
"Return Policy" (2015)	"Mixtape" (2016)	"Good Night for Going Nowhere" (2016)

"Mixtape" is a song recorded by Canadian country music duo Autumn Hill for their second studio album, Anchor (2015). It was released to Canadian country radio through Wax Records on January 27, 2016 as the album's third official single and to digital retailers in the United States on January 29, 2015. The song was written and produced by David "Dwave" Thomson and co-written by Stephanie Chapman and Christian Rada.

== Content ==
"Mixtape" is a country pop song with a duration of three minutes and twenty-nine seconds with lyrics that reminisce about a former lover and relate the narrator's emotions to songs on a mixtape. The song was reportedly on hold for Keith Urban and Sheryl Crow to perform as a duet before being offered to Autumn Hill.

== Critical reception ==
Country 103 from Kamloops, BC wrote that the song "perfectly embodies the spirit of what made Autumn Hill the banner Canadian Country duo they are today" with its "tender, playful, and... unforgettable" sound built upon strong vocal harmonies.

== Track listing ==
Digital download – single

1. "Mixtape" – 3:29

== Chart performance ==
Chart (2016)	Peak position
Canada Country (Billboard)	19

== Release history ==
List of release dates, showing release format and reference
Country	Date	Format	Label	Ref.
Canada	January 27, 2016	Country radio	Wax Records	
United States	January 29, 2016	Digital download	Wax Records	
