= Toes (Lights song) =

Single by Lights

from the album Siberia
- Released: August 16, 2011
- Recorded: 2011
- Studio: Metalworks (Mississauga, ON)
- Genre: Synthpop; new wave
- Length: 3:19
- Label: Universal Music; Last Gang; LIGHTS Music
- Songwriter: Lights Poxleitner
- Producers: Lights; Tawgs Salter; Holy Fuck

Lights singles chronology
"Everybody Breaks a Glass" (2011)	"Toes" (2011)	"Where the Fence Is Low" (2012)

Music video
- "Toes" on YouTube

"Toes" is a song recorded by Canadian singer-songwriter Lights for her second studio album, Siberia (2011). The song made its radio premiere on 104.5 CHUM-FM on August 5, 2011 and was released digitally on August 16, 2011 as the official second single for the album. It debuted and peaked at number 62 on the Canadian Hot 100. "Toes" was released to the UK in July 2012.

== Composition ==
"Toes" is written in the key of F♯ minor and set to an approximate tempo of 124 BPM.

== Critical reception ==
In a review of Siberia, James Murray of musicOMH wrote that "Toes" had a "contagious" pop chorus and exemplified "some of the best songwriting Lights has to offer." Matt Collar of AllMusic labelled "Toes" an "album pick" and described it as a "sparkling, anthemic" song that brings to mind popular contemporaries.

== Music video ==
The music video for "Toes" premiered September 14, 2011. The video features Lights' hometown, Toronto, mostly in Dufferin Station. Lights is shown playing with her band in a brightly lit room. She then gets out of a taxi and goes to a skate park and a subway. Afterwards she goes back to the brightly lit room to play with her band. The video ends with a shot of LIGHTS walking away on a sidewalk.

== Track listing ==
Digital download – single
No.	Title	Writer(s)	Producer(s)	Length
1.	"Toes"	Lights Poxleitner	Lights; Tawgs Salter; Holy Fuck	3:19

UK CD single
No.	Title	Writer(s)	Producer(s)	Length
1.	"Toes" (UK radio mix)	Poxleitner	Lights; Salter; Holy Fuck; Dan Parry (Note: Co-producer)	3:23

== Charts ==
Chart (2011)	Peak position
Canada Hot 100 (Billboard)	62
Canada AC (Billboard)	49
Netherlands (Dutch Tipparade)	11

== Release history ==
Country	Date	Format	Label	Ref.
Canada	August 16, 2011	Digital download	LIGHTS Music; Universal Music	
United States	August 16, 2011	Digital download	LIGHTS Music; Last Gang	
United Kingdom	July 15, 2012	Digital download	LIGHTS Music; Universal Music	
United Kingdom	July 16, 2012	CD single	Last Gang	
