= Return Policy =

Single by Autumn Hill

from the album Anchor
- Released: August 31, 2015
- Genre: Country pop; country rock
- Length: 3:00 (single remix)
- Label: Wax
- Songwriter(s): Tareya Green; Mike Robins; Lindsay Rimes
- Producer(s): Lindsay Rimes; David "Dwave" Thomson

Autumn Hill singles chronology
"Blame" (2015)	"Return Policy" (2015)	"Mixtape" (2016)

Music video
- "Return Policy" on YouTube

"Return Policy" is a song recorded by Canadian country music duo Autumn Hill for their second studio album, Anchor (2015). It was serviced to Canadian country radio on August 31, 2015 as the album's second official single after first being made available to digital retailers on June 8, 2015 as the album's third countdown single. The song was written by group members Tareya Green and Mike Robins along with Lindsay Rimes, and was produced by Rimes and David "Dwave" Thomson.

== Content ==
"Return Policy" is a midtempo country pop and country rock song with a duration of three minutes and one second. It features a "sassy" lyric and a verbal back-and-forth between the two leads. The song's lyrics compare an ex-lover to a defective product for whom the narrator wishes he or she had a receipt and could return.

== Track listing ==
Digital download – remix

1. "Return Policy (Remix)" – 3:00

== Music video ==
The accompanying video premiered through CMT on October 30, 2015 and features the duo performing on a makeshift stage on the back of a pickup truck as it drives through downtown Toronto at night. It was uploaded to the group' official YouTube channel on November 6, 2015.

== Chart performance ==
Chart (2015)	Peak position
Canada Country (Billboard)	22

== Release history ==
List of release dates, showing release format and reference
Country	Date	Format	Label	Ref.
Canada	June 8, 2015	Digital download – promotional single	Wax Records	
Canada	August 31, 2015	Country radio	Wax Records	
Canada	November 13, 2015	Digital download (remix)	Wax Records	
United States	November 27, 2015	Digital download (remix)	Wax Records	
