= Skin & Earth =

2017 studio album by Lights

Studio album by Lights
- Released: September 22, 2017
- Studios: Jordan Palmer's house (Mississauga, ON); Mick Schultz Studio (Los Angeles, CA); Mission (British Columbia); Paramount Recording Studios (Los Angeles, CA); Pulse Recording (Los Angeles, CA); Smashbox Studios (Los Angeles, CA); Westlake Recording Studios (Hollywood, CA)
- Genre: Electropop
- Length: 43:46
- Label: Warner Bros.
- Producers: Lights; Benjamin Rice; Big Data; Corin Roddick; Dylan Bauld; Jordan Palmer; Koz; Matt Rad; Mick Schultz; Steve James

Lights chronology
Midnight Machines (2016)	Skin & Earth (2017)	Skin & Earth Acoustic (2019)

Singles from Skin&Earth
- 1. "Giants" Released: June 23, 2017; 2. "We Were Here" Released: January 24, 2018

Skin & Earth (stylized as Skin&Earth) is the fourth studio album by Canadian singer-songwriter Lights. The album was released on September 22, 2017 through Warner Bros. Records. The album was preceded by release of her single "Giants", as well as three other songs released promotionally. The album has charted at number three in Canada and ninety-fifth in the US. Similar to her past albums, Skin & Earth incorporates electronic and pop elements. Lights created the album alongside her comic book of the same name, which was initially released in July 2017. Lights' latest and final issue in the series was released on December 13, 2017, and a trade paperback was released on April 3, 2018.

== Background ==
Lights claimed in an interview with Billboard that she has always linked comic books and music together, but this is her first time creating a concept album based on her own comic book series, which is illustrated and written by herself through Dynamite Entertainment. The comic book features the story of a girl named Enaia Jin who is looking for hope in a post-apocalyptic world. Lights explains that in the comic series, Enaia "becomes entangled with a dark spiritual friend who in turn becomes much more connected to the world around her than she ever thought and sets her on a journey that could change the course of everything." Tied in with the comic, each song on the Skin&Earth album corresponds with one of the six issues of the comic book. Lights claims that the comic book was inspired by strong female heroes such as Wonder Woman, and features fantasy genre characteristics such as romance, mortals, cults, and gods.

When asked where she got the idea to interweave the comic book and album, Lights responded with "I'm just such a fan of both mediums, so why not be the first one to really do it? It's been done slightly in a couple of ways before, but I don't think it's been done to this degree, so closely tied to an album and certainly not with a woman or in pop music." Unlike artists in the past, Lights wrote the comics and songs at the same time and both the comic and album draw on each other.

Skin&Earth was recorded with the help of Corin Ruddick from Purity Ring, Alan Wilkis from Big Data, Josh Dun, the drummer from Twenty One Pilots, and Stephen Kozmeniuk, a Canadian songwriter. Even though the album is based on the comic book series, Lights claimed that she ensured that the music related both to the comic book issues, but also to the real world so that listeners could still understand and feel connected to the songs on the album. Out of the 14 songs on the record, Lights says that her favourite is "Fight Club," but she hopes that all of the songs are able to transport listeners "to another world." The album has been called by many critics "a mess of emotion that is ultimately revealed."

== Promotion ==
=== Singles ===
Prior to the album's release, four promotional singles from the album were released, "Giants", "Skydiving", "Savage", and "New Fears". Each single was accompanied by a music video that was set in Lights' post-apocalyptic comic book world through the song and music video. In the videos, Lights plays the main character of the comic book, Enaia, and is depicted walking around the city, being transported into nature, and meeting other comic book characters in their real life forms.

"Giants" was later serviced to American hot adult contemporary radio on July 24, 2017. "We Were Here" was released as the second radio single on January 24, 2018 with the music video premiering on February 2, 2018.

=== Tour ===
In November 2017, it was announced that Lights would embark on the We Were Here tour in 2018 in support of the album. The tour began on January 30, 2018 in Vancouver and ended on April 7, 2018 in London, Ontario.

== Track listing ==
No.	Title	Writer(s)	Length
1.	"Intro"	Lights Poxleitner; Benjamin Rice	0:34
2.	"Skydiving"	Poxleitner; Fiona Bevan; Matt Radosevich	2:55
3.	"Until the Light"	Poxleitner; Corin Roddick	3:26
4.	"Savage"	Poxleitner; Dylan Bauld	3:19
5.	"New Fears"	Poxleitner; Jordan Palmer	3:46
6.	"Morphine"	Poxleitner; Bevan; Stephen James Philbin	4:04
7.	"We Were Here"	Poxleitner; Koz; Todd Clark	3:49
8.	"Kicks"	Poxleitner; Koz; Clark	3:17
9.	"Giants"	Poxleitner; Michael Abram Schultz; Iain James	3:16
10.	"Moonshine"	Poxleitner; Alan Wilkis	3:13
11.	"Interlude"	Poxleitner	1:07
12.	"Magnetic Field"	Poxleitner; Bauld	3:47
13.	"Fight Club"	Poxleitner; Koz; Clark	3:20
14.	"Almost Had Me"	Poxleitner; Bauld	3:53
Total length:			43:46

== Reception ==
AllMusic rated the album at four stars, writing "Taking nothing away from Lights' comic book ambitions, Skin & Earth works as a fearlessly mature, confidently articulated album with enough musical and lyrical gravitas to stand proudly on its own."

== Charts ==
Chart (2017)	Peak position
Canadian Albums (Billboard)	3
US Billboard 200	95
US Vinyl Albums (Billboard)	15

== Acoustic version ==
Skin & Earth Acoustic

Studio album by Lights
- Released: July 12, 2019
- Length: 40:11
- Label: Fueled by Ramen

Lights chronology
Skin & Earth (2017)	Skin & Earth Acoustic (2019)	AM 444 (2020)

Singles from Skin&Earth Acoustic
- 1. "Lost Girls" Released: May 14, 2019

In May 2019, Lights announced that an acoustic version of the album, titled Skin & Earth Acoustic, which was released on July 12. It includes seven songs from Skin & Earth and three new songs.

=== Track listing ===
No.	Title	Writer(s)	Length
1.	"Skydiving (Cliff Recording)"	Lights Poxleitner; Fiona Bevan; Matt Radosevich	3:57
2.	"Until the Light (Truck Cab Recording)"	Poxleitner; Corin Roddick	3:34
3.	"Savage (Rain Recording)"	Poxleitner; Dylan Bauld	4:04
4.	"New Fears (Bedroom Recording)"	Poxleitner; Jordan Palmer	4:34
5.	"We Were Here (Tunnel Recording)"	Poxleitner; Koz; Todd Clark	4:15
6.	"Kicks (River Recording)"	Poxleitner; Koz; Clark	4:16
7.	"Almost Had Me (Desert Recording)"	Poxleitner; Bauld	4:40
8.	"Tabs"		3:40
9.	"Lost Girls"		3:31
10.	"Down Forever"		3:40
Total length:			40:11
