= Drew Pearson (songwriter) =

American songwriter and producer

- Born: Andrew William Pearson; Wadsworth, Ohio, United States
- Genres: Pop, alternative rock, country, synth pop, indie pop
- Occupations: Songwriter, record producer, musician
- Instruments: Guitar, bass, piano, drums
- Years active: 2007–present
- Website: www.page1management.com/writers-producers/drew-pearson

Andrew William Pearson is a Grammy-nominated American songwriter, producer, and multi-instrumentalist.

== Selected songwriting discography ==
Year	Artist	Album	Label	Song	Co-written with
2021	The Veronicas	Human	Sony	Out of Time (feat. Wrabel)	Jessica Origliasso, Lisa Origliasso, Stephen Wrabel
2020	Kesha	--	RCA	"Home Alone", "Nicolas Cage"	Kesha Sebert
2020	Kesha	High Road	RCA	"Shadow", "Cowboy Blues", "Father Daughter Dance", "Big Bad Wolf", "High Road"	Kesha Sebert, Stephen Wrabel, Eric Leva
2020	Isaac Dunbar	Isaac's Insects	RCA	"Scorton's Creek"	Isaac Dunbar, Rory Adams
2019	Craves (feat. Ashe (singer))	--	Geffen Records	"Never Enough"	Ashlyn Willson, Justin Gammella, Thomas Ntamtsios
2019	Isaac Dunbar	Balloons Don't Float Here	RCA	"Ferrari"	Isaac Dunbar, Rory Adams
2019	Maddie Poppe	Whirlwind	Hollywood Records	"Postcard From Me"	Maddie Poppe, Amy Kuney
2019	Wrabel	--	Big Gay Records	"I Want You"	Ali Tamposi, Stephen Wrabel
2018	Milo Greene	Adult Contemporary	Nettwerk	"Easy Listening Pt 2," "Your Eyes"	Milo Greene
2018	Quinn XCII	The Story of Us	Columbia Records	"Before it Burned"	Quinn XCII
2018	Katelyn Tarver	--	Duly Noted Records	"LY4L"	Katelyn Tarver
2017	Kygo	Kids in Love	Sony, Ultra	“With You”	Wrabel, Erik Hassle
2017	Galantis	Aviary	Atlantic Records	"Written in the Scars"	Wrabel, Andrew Jackson, Christian Karlsson, Jimmy Koitzsch, Henrik Jonback, Linus Eklöw
2017	Kesha	Rainbow	RCA	"Woman," "Boogie Feet," "Spaceship," "Emotional" (Japanese Release)	
2017	Ansel Elgort	--	Island Records	"All I Think About is You"	Ansel Elgort, Tom Norris, Aleksandr Parkhomenko, Yury Parkhomenko
2017	Sweater Beats (ft. R.LUM.R)	--	Big Beat Records	"Altar"	Stephenie Steph Jones, Antonio Cuna, Stephen Samuel Wrabel
2017	Michelle Branch	Hopeless Romantic	Verve Records	"Not a Love Song", "Bad Side"	Michelle Branch, Amy Kuney
2016	Citizen Four	Untitled album	Island	"Cold"	Makeba Riddick, Stephen Wrabel
2016	Against the Current	In Our Bones	Fueled By Ramen	"Blood Like Gasoline"	Against the Current
2015	Katharine McPhee	Hysteria	eOne	"Break"	Stephen Wrabel, Jon Castelli, Aaron Joseph
2015	Wrabel	Non-album single	--	"I Want You"	Wrabel
2014	Switchfoot	Fading West	Atlantic/Word	"When We Come Alive"	Switchfoot
2014	Switchfoot	Fading West	Atlantic/Word	"Let It Out"	Switchfoot
2014	Down with Webster	Party For Your Life	DWW	"Circles"	Down With Webster
2014	Wrabel	Sideways EP	--	"Into the Wild"	Wrabel
2014	Lights	Little Machines	Warner Bros.	"Muscle Memory"	Lights
2014	Lights	Little Machines	Warner Bros.	"Speeding"	Lights
2014	Lights	Little Machines	Warner Bros.	"Running with the Boys"	Lights
2014	Lights	Little Machines	Warner Bros.	"From All Sides"	Lights
2014	Lights	Little Machines	Warner Bros.	"Child"	Lights
2013	2AM Club	Non-album single	RCA	"Not Your Boyfriend"	2AM Club, Stephen Wrabel
2013	The Royal Concept	Smile EP	Republic	"Higher Than Love"	The Royal Concept
2012	Phillip Phillips	The World from the Side of the Moon	Interscope/19	"Home"	Greg Holden
2012	Phillip Phillips	The World from the Side of the Moon	Interscope/19	"Can't Go Wrong"	Phillip Phillips, Greg Holden
2012	Cody Simpson	Paradise	Atlantic	"Hello"	Ryan Marrone, Garrick Smith, Jaden Michaels
2011	Zac Brown Band	Footloose	Atlantic	"Where The River Goes"	Zac Brown, Anne Preven, Wyatt Durrette
2011	Stan Walker	Let The Music Play	Sony	"Loud"	Stephen Wrabel, Jon Asher
2011	Stan Walker	Let The Music Play	Sony	"Shine"	Stephen Wrabel, Jon Asher

== Selected production discography ==
Year	Artist	Album/Song	Label	Details
2018	Kesha	"I Need a Woman to Love"	RCA, Kemosabe	Producer
2018	Kesha	"Here Comes the Change"	RCA, Kemosabe	Producer, writer
2018	Sage feat. Kesha & Chika	"Safe"	RCA, Kemosabe	Producer, writer
2018	REYNA	"Ink on My Skin"	--	Producer, writer
2018	REYNA	"Heartbeats"	--	Producer, writer
2018	Katelyn Tarver	"LY4L"	Duly Noted Records	Producer, writer
2017	Kygo	“With You”	Sony, Ultra	Co-produced with Kygo
2017	REYNA	"Cool With It," "Matinee"	--	Producer, writer
2017	Galantis	"Written in the Scars"	Atlantic Records	Producer
2017	Kesha	"Woman," "Bastards," "Boogie Feet," "Godzilla," "Spaceship," "Emotional" (Japanese Release)	RCA	Producer
2017	Wrabel	"The Village"	Epic Records	Producer, writer
2016	Citizen Four	Cold	Island	Producer
2016	REYNA	"Kill Me," "Magazines"	--	Producer, writer
2015	Wrabel	"I Want You"	--	Producer
2014	Wrabel	"Into the Wild"	Island Records	Producer, writer
2014	Lights	Little Machines	Warner Bros.	Producer, mixer
2014	Switchfoot	Fading West	Atlantic/Word	Producer
2014	Down with Webster	Party For Your Life	DWW	Producer
2013	Lee DeWyze	Frames	Caroline Records	Producer
2013	2AM Club	"Not Your Boyfriend"	RCA	Producer, mixer
2012	Cody Simpson	Paradise	Atlantic	Producer
2012	Lee DeWyze	"The Fight" (non-album single)	Caroline Records	Producer
2012	Phillip Phillips	The World from the Side of the Moon	Interscope/19	Producer
2011	Stan Walker	Let The Music Play	Sony	Producer
2008	Katy Perry	One of the Boys	Capitol Records	Engineer
2007	OneRepublic	Dreaming Out Loud	Interscope	Engineer
2007	Mika	Life in Cartoon Motion	Island/Casablanca	Engineer
2007	The Veronicas	Hook Me Up	Sire	Engineer

== Awards and nominations ==
Grammy Awards

- Grammy Award for Best Song Written for Visual Media – "Where The River Goes" by Zac Brown Band (Nominated)

Juno Awards

- Pop Album of the Year – Little Machines by Lights (Won)
- Pop Album of the Year – Party For Your Life by Down With Webster (Nominated)
