= Anything at All =

Single by Autumn Hill

from the album Favourite Mistake
- Released: October 30, 2012
- Genre: Country; country pop
- Length: 3:43
- Label: Wax
- Songwriter(s): David Thomson; Heather Morgan
- Producer(s): David Thomson

Autumn Hill singles chronology
"Anything at All" (2012)	"Can't Keep Waiting" (2013)

"Anything at All" is a song written by David Thomson and Heather Morgan, and recorded by Canadian country music duo Autumn Hill for their debut studio album, Favourite Mistake (2013). It was released through Wax Records as the lead single from the album on October 30, 2012.

== Content ==
The song is a plea to a former lover, wondering if there's "anything at all" left of what they once had, and if there's any chance they might rekindle their romance.

== Music video ==
An official music video for the song was directed by Margaret Malandruccolo and debuted on November 15, 2012.

== Chart performance ==
"Anything At All" debuted at #96 on the Canadian Hot 100 for the week ending January 26, 2013.

Chart (2013)	Peak position
Canada (Canadian Hot 100)	79
Canada AC (Billboard)	30
Canada Country (Billboard)	14
Canada Hot AC (Billboard)	37
