= Reyna (musical group) =

American electro-pop duo

REYNA
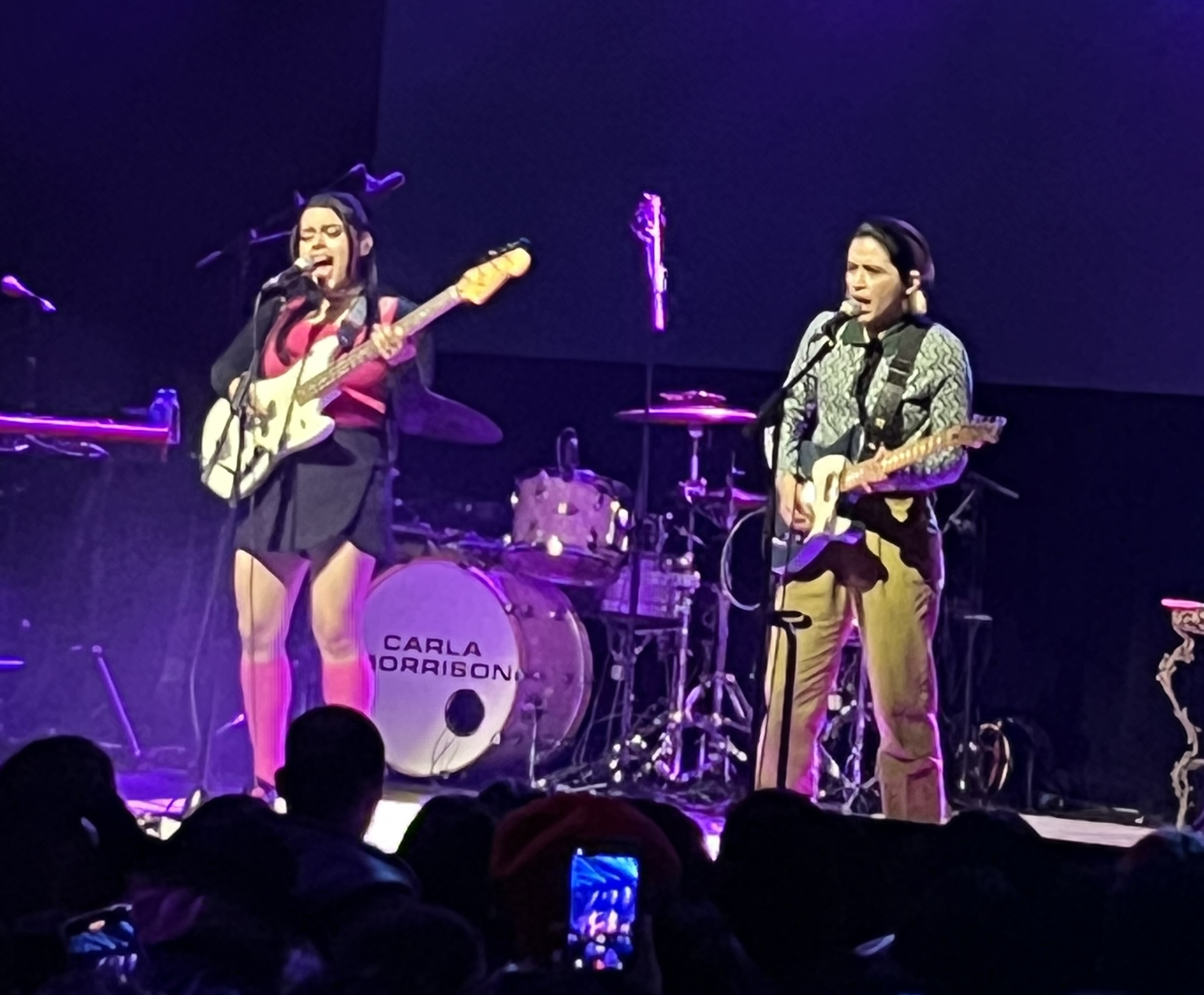
- Gab (left) and Vic (right) performing in 2023.

Background information
- Also known as: Vic and Gab
- Born: El Paso, Texas, U.S.
- Genres: pop; synthpop
- Years active: 2011–present
- Label: Cosmica Artists
- Website: https://reynatheband.myshopify.com/

Reyna (stylized as REYNA) is a Milwaukee-based pop duo.

== History ==
=== Origin ===
Sisters Gabriela "Gab" and Victoriah "Vic" Banuelos grew up in El Paso, Texas. As children, they would sing at their grandmother's shows, as she was a singer in a mariachi band. They continued on to write and record their own songs for guitar and bass from a young age, with encouragement from their father.

In 2008, the two recorded a full-length album in Spanish as Caramello after being picked up by Sony Music. However, the label desired a different musical direction; the lack of artistic freedom led Gabriela and Victoriah to cancel the album release and continue as independent artists.

After their single "So Long So Tired" was used in an episode of Skins in 2011, the two decided to take a musical career more seriously. Having moved to Milwaukee, they formed a band together as "Vic and Gab". The local music scene helped Vic and Gab get shows, including playing at an Obama rally in 2012. In 2013 they released a full-length album, Love of Mine. They were discovered by a management team in 2014, which enabled them to work with more collaborators and gain the resources to move towards a "fuller" and more synth-pop sound. By the time Vic and Gab played their last show in October 2015, they were one of the most popular local bands in Milwaukee.

=== Reyna ===
Vic and Gab reformed as Reyna in 2016, choosing the name based on the Spanish word for "queen", which represents their Mexican American heritage and their identity as women. The decision to reform came after recording new music, as "it just sounded so different from Vic and Gab that [they] thought it needed its own name and its own identity".

Reyna properly formed with the release of first single, "Spill Your Colors", in 2016. The song was inspired by Vic's experience with coming out as gay. Reyna has since released several singles, and have stated they prefer focusing on producing songs as singles, as opposed to as albums.

In 2018, Reyna entered and won the Americas chapter of Project: Aloft Star, in which artists compete to record a single at Capitol Studios. There were over 2,000 entries to the 2018 competition.

Reyna released their debut EP, you could at least say goodbye, in 2022, with record label Cosmica Artists. The EP, which is partially in Spanish, describes a romantic relationship that ends with one partner ghosting the other, inspired by one of Victoriah's recent relationships.

In 2023, Reyna went on tour in the Northeastern United States supporting Carla Morrison. Following the tour, Reyna left Cosmica Artists, citing a desire for more control over their music.

Reyna's following EP, Limonada, had an early-access release through digital platform EVEN before its official release on October 20, 2023. Limonada was written about the process of falling in love again, following the heartbreak described by you could at least say goodbye.

Reyna has opened shows for Kesha, Chvrches, Death Cab for Cutie, and Bleachers.

== Artistry ==
=== Influences ===
Musically, Reyna is inspired by Selena, Rolling Stones, The Who, and Sylvan Esso. Tegan and Sara, another band composed of two sisters, also inspired Reyna to believe in their project.

=== Style ===
Reyna's music has been described as "glossy ‘80s-inspired electro-pop" and "euphoric, note-perfect synth-pop" by critics. Reyna has described their own music as "fun, danceable and glittery." EPs you could at least say goodbye and Limonada have been noted as being more "lo-fi" and less "dance-pop" compared to their previous releases.

== Band members ==
- Gabriela "Gab" Banuelos – lead vocals, bass
- Victoriah "Vic" Banuelos – vocals, guitar, keyboards

=== Current backing musicians ===
- Patrick Ridgen – drums

=== Previous backing musicians ===
- Jesus Nanez – drums

== Discography ==
=== Extended plays ===
Title
Extended play details
Notes
Limonada
- Released: October 2023
- Format: LP, Streaming

Track listing
No.	Title	Length
1.	"Good Time"	3:30
2.	"Serotonin"	3:30
3.	"Optimist"	3:15
4.	"Limoncello"	2:40
5.	"Lemon Tree"	3:02
Total length:		14:57

you could at least say goodbye
- Released: May 2022
- Format: LP, Streaming

Track listing
No.	Title	Length
1.	"talk it out"	3:22
2.	"you could at least say goodbye"	3:39
3.	"2am serenade"	4:03
4.	"orgullosa"	2:47
5.	"todo to nada"	2:33
Total length:		16:25

=== Singles ===
Title	Year
"Home Alone"	2021
"Quarantine Baby"	2021
"7'11"	2020
"Lonely Girl"	2020
"Coachella"	2020
"Saw You With Somebody Else"	2020
"Clueless"	2019
"The Way I Loved You"	2019
"Heartbeat"	2018
"Baby Forget It"	2018
"Cool With It"	2018
"Matinee"	2017
"Kill Me"	2016
"Magazines"	2016
"Ink On My Skin"	2016
"Spill Your Colors"	2016
