= Jason Parsons =

Canadian DJ and producer

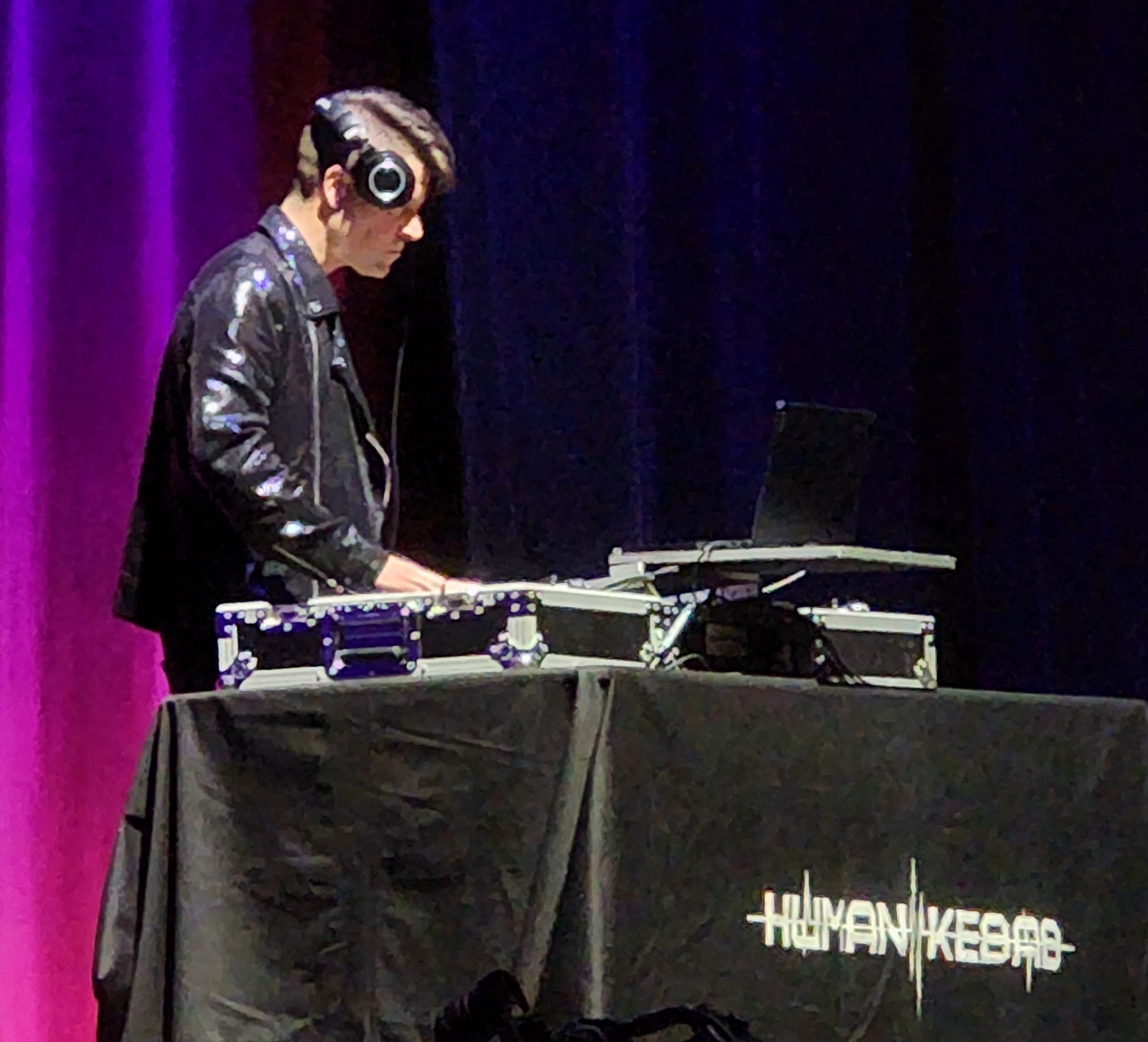
- Parsons performing in 2023

Background information
- Also known as: Human Kebab; Jay Parsons
- Origin: Stouffville, Ontario, Canada
- Genre: Alternative rock
- Occupation: Musician
- Instruments: Turntables; keyboards; programming
- Years active: 2004–present
- Label: Sony/ATV
- Member of: USS; DIVIIDEDBY
- Website: humankebab.com

Jason Parsons is a Canadian DJ and producer who works under the name Human Kebab. He is best known as one half of the rock/electronic duo USS, alongside Ash Buchholz. In 2023, he launched a new project, title DIVIIDEDBY, together with Three Days Grace frontman Adam Gontier.

== Biography ==
Raised in Stouffville, Ontario, Canada, Parsons forms one half of the alternative rock band USS. He has contributed writing and production to all USS recordings as well as to fellow Canadian artist Lights on her second album, Siberia, and her subsequent release, Little Machines, in 2014.

Under the moniker Human Kebab, Parsons was featured on the 2012 track "Livin' Tonight" by fellow Canadian modern rock act illScarlett. He also did production work on Elise LeGrow's 2012 song "Weed and Wine" as well as providing drum programming for Suzie McNeil on her 2012 album, Dear Love.

Parsons hosts and DJs two alternative rock radio remix shows. The first, SubSONiC, began in 2013 in Edmonton, Alberta, on Sonic 102.9, followed by Rock Paper Mixers on KXRN-LP in Laguna Beach, California, three years later. He has also performed as a DJ alongside the Canadian hip-hop artist Maestro Fresh-Wes.

Peaking at No. 27 on Canada's Alternative Rock chart in April 2013, the song "Weird Science" by the Toronto-based electro-rock band Most Non Heinous was co-written by Parsons.

In 2023, Parsons, together with Three Days Grace frontman Adam Gontier, launched the project DIVIIDEDBY.
