= Siberia (Lights album) =

2011 studio album by Lights

Studio album by Lights
- Released: October 4, 2011
- Recorded: 2010–2011
- Studio: Metalworks (Mississauga, Ontario)
- Genres: Synth-pop; electropop; dubstep; indie electronic; alternative rock
- Length: 57:01
- Labels: Lights Music; Last Gang; Universal Music
- Producers: Lights; Tawgs Salter; David Thomson; Holy Fuck

Lights chronology
Acoustic (2010)	Siberia (2011)	Siberia Acoustic (2013)

Singles from Siberia
- 1. "Everybody Breaks a Glass" Released: July 19, 2011; 2. "Toes" Released: August 16, 2011; 3. "Where the Fence Is Low" Released: January 31, 2012; 4. "Banner" Released: February 9, 2012; 5. "Timing Is Everything" Released: October 26, 2012

Siberia is the second studio album by Canadian singer-songwriter Lights. It was released worldwide on October 4, 2011, excluding Australia (October 28, 2011) and the United Kingdom (March 12, 2012). Production was handled by Tawgs Salter and Canadian electronic band Holy Fuck, while featuring guest vocals from Canadian rapper Shad on two of the album's tracks. Musically, Siberia has been described as being "grittier" and "darker" whilst also incorporating "poppier moments", and while the album still uses prominent elements of synth-pop, it also features influences of other genres such as dubstep, hip-hop, and bitpop.

The album has received generally positive reviews from music critics, with some commending Lights' vocal performance as well as the album's heavier and more mature sound, while others criticized its lack of variety. It debuted at number three on the Canadian Albums Chart, selling more than 10,000 in its first week, while also peaking at number 47 on the US Billboard 200 in the United States. It received a Juno Award nomination for Pop Album of the Year on February 7, 2012. It was certified gold on April 27, 2012 in Canada, denoting sales in excess of 40,000. The album spawned the singles "Everybody Breaks a Glass" and "Toes" before the album's release and "Where the Fence Is Low", "Banner", and "Timing Is Everything" later in 2012.

== Background ==
Siberia follows Lights' debut studio album The Listening (2009), and her second extended play Acoustic (2010). After Acoustic, Lights, a Toronto-based synth-pop artist, spent time searching for inspiration for her next album. Lights describes a night out in Montreal turning her on to dubstep, which she described as "heavy and raunchy but with this melody in there". At the suggestion of her manager, Jian Ghomeshi, Lights decided to collaborate with the Toronto-based electronica band Holy Fuck, who she had met previously at the Reading and Leeds Festivals. She stated she was drawn to their style of creating lo-fi electro sound using analog equipment, something she described as "a new way of thinking", and related with the band's focus on experimentation.

Lights credited Crystal Castles, Bon Iver, Skream and Benga as musical influences for the album, as well as a book by artist Clyde Caldwell. The final track in the album, "Day One", was a live recording of the last nine minutes of Lights' first jam session with Holy Fuck. Listening to it back the next day, they decided to keep the recording and turn it into its own track.

== Critical reception ==
Professional ratings
Aggregate scores
Source	Rating
Metacritic	(72/100)
Review scores
Source	Rating
AbsolutePunk	7.5/10
AllMusic	4/5 stars
Alternative Press	3/5 stars
Toronto Star	3/4 stars
DIY Magazine	6/10
musicOMH	3/5 stars
Release Magazine	9/10

Siberia received generally positive reviews from music critics, with some commending Lights' vocal performance as well as the album's heavier and more mature sound, while others criticized its lack of originality. Matt Collar from AllMusic gave it a positive review, saying "The album is a blissful, laser-toned experience where Poxleitner's sweet voice is expertly wrapped in stylish, multicolored hues of fluorescent keyboard squelch and bass guitar shimmer." Drew Beringer from AbsolutePunk also gave it a positive review, calling it "one of the better electro-pop albums of 2011, one that will stimulate your senses and rope you in with its instantaneous catchiness", but stated that Lights' vocal performance was "too safe".

Alternative Press gave the album a mixed review, saying "The bulk of the album's 14 tracks find her playing it safe with a helium-voiced squeak reminiscent of (take your pick) Gwen Stefani, Santigold, Kate Bush or Cyndi Lauper." Kosta Lucas from DIY Magazine wrote the album failed to shine by blending into what is already out there, adding that it is "a good snapshot of what is currently en vogue in modern music", though he praised the songs which showcased more of Lights' voice, stating that "she sings very prettily".

James Murray of musicOMH wrote that the combination of having a "light-hearted pop musician" team up with "one of the most experimental, noisy electronic producers currently active" was a juxtaposition that resulted in "a unique, and for the most part, captivating listen", but also criticised the vocal performance, which Murray stated was often "overshadowed by wobbly bass and distorted synths".

== Commercial performance ==
In Canada, Siberia debuted at number three on the Canadian Albums Chart, selling more than 10,000 in its first week. On April 27, 2012, the album was certified gold by Music Canada for denoting sales in excess of 40,000 copies in Canada.

== Track listing ==
Standard edition
No.	Title	Writer(s)	Length
1.	"Siberia"	Lights; Brian Borcherdt; Graham Walsh	4:19
2.	"Where the Fence is Low"	Lights; Salter; Jason Parsons	3:24
3.	"Toes"	Lights	3:19
4.	"Banner"	Lights; Salter	3:37
5.	"Everybody Breaks a Glass" (featuring Holy Fuck and Shad)	Lights; Borcherdt; Walsh; Shadrach Kabango	3:55
6.	"Heavy Rope"	Lights; Salter	3:59
7.	"Timing Is Everything"	Lights; Salter	3:16
8.	"Peace Sign"	Lights; Dave Thomson	3:20
9.	"Cactus in the Valley"	Lights	3:23
10.	"Suspension"	Lights; Salter	4:04
11.	"Flux and Flow" (featuring Shad)	Lights; Salter; Parsons	3:20
12.	"Fourth Dimension"	Lights; Thomson	3:27
13.	"...And Counting"	Lights; Thomson	4:42
14.	"Day One"	Lights; Borcherdt; Walsh	8:58
Total length:			57:01

iTunes Deluxe Version
No.	Title	Writer(s)	Length
15.	"Frame and Focus"	Lights; Thomson	3:53
16.	"Cactus in the Valley" (Acoustic)	Lights	3:48
17.	"Toes" (Music video)		3:31
18.	"Toes" (Nightbox Remix) (pre-order only)	Lights; Salter	5:01

Limited Webstore Bonus Tracks
No.	Title	Writer(s)	Length
15.	"Frame and Focus"	Lights; Thomson	3:53
16.	"Cactus in the Valley" (Acoustic)	Lights	3:48
17.	"Everybody Breaks a Glass" (Remix)	Lights; Borcherdt; Walsh; Kabango	4:27

UK Re-release
No.	Title	Writer(s)	Length
15.	"Frame and Focus"	Lights; Thomson	3:53
16.	"Cactus in the Valley" (Acoustic)	Lights	3:48
17.	"Toes" (Nightbox remix)	Lights	5:01
18.	"Banner" (SixSickSix remix)	Lights; Salter	3:42

== Personnel ==
- Lights – bass, guitar, synthesizer, vocals, producer
- Brian Borcherdt – producer
- Daenen Bramberger – engineer
- Joän Carvalho – mastering
- Wayne Cochrane – assistant engineer
- Caitlin Cronenberg – photography
- Lenny DeRose – engineer
- Holy Fuck – drum producer, engineer, synthesizer
- Shad K – vocals
- Maurie Kauffman – drums
- Terrance Lam – assistance engineer
- Graham Marsh – producer
- Dave Mohasci – engineer
- Jay Parsons – composer, drum programming
- Thomas Salter – bass, engineer, guitar, synthesizer, producer
- Dave Thompson – programming, producer
- Graham Walsh – producer

== Charts ==
=== Weekly charts ===
Chart (2011)	Peak position
Canadian Albums (Billboard)	3
US Billboard 200	47
US Independent Albums (Billboard)	11

== Certifications ==
Region	Certification	Certified units/sales
Canada (Music Canada)	Gold	40,000^{^}
^{^} Shipments figures based on certification alone.

== Release history ==
Region	Date	Label
United States	October 4, 2011	Last Gang, Lights Music
Canada	October 4, 2011	Universal Music, Lights Music
Worldwide	October 4, 2011	Universal Music, Lights Music
Australia	October 28, 2011	Universal Music, Lights Music
United Kingdom	March 12, 2012	Universal Music, Lights Music
