= Tawgs Salter =

Canadian musician, songwriter, producer and recording engineer

- Born: Thomas Salter; Vineland, Ontario, Canada
- Instruments: Guitar; piano; keyboards; programming
- Years active: 2000–present
- Label: Sony/ATV
- Formerly of: Dunk

Thomas "Tawgs" Salter is a Canadian musician, songwriter, producer, and recording engineer. His extensive body of musical work includes a vast array of artists ranging from Josh Groban, Lights and Lenka to Chantal Kreviazuk, Fefe Dobson, Dear Rouge, Midway State, and USS. Salter has also worked alongside Grammy-winning writer/producer Walter Afanasieff. Salter's music, production and collaborations have been featured on television shows, including Vampire Diaries, Grey's Anatomy, American Idol, and The Simpsons, to films such as Prom Night and Joe Somebody (Tom Wilson).

== Career ==
Salter's writing and production of the soaring pop ballad "You Are Loved (Don't Give Up)", Josh Groban's first single from his multi-platinum selling third studio album Awake, reached #9 on the Adult Contemporary Billboard chart. The song was sung by Lisa Simpson on the television show The Simpsons in Season 20, Episode 9.

On December 15, 2009, Canadian singer-songwriter LIGHTS was acknowledged with two No.1 song awards by SOCAN, alongside writing partner Salter, who helped her pen her smash hits "Drive My Soul" and "Saviour". "Drive My Soul" reached the top spot on MuchMusic Countdown on January 8, 2009.

In 2012, Tawgs Salter produced "Drive", the debut song of American actor and singer Cheyenne Jackson.

In 2016, he produced Chantal Kreviazuk's album Hard Sail.

Also in 2016, he appeared on Schiller's Future album (For You).

== Discography ==
Year	Artist	Title	Label	Role
2024	Jake Rose	"What I Got"		Co-writer, Producer
2024	Liam St. John	"Landslide Over the Highway"	Big Loud	Co-writer
2024	Goldie Boutilier	"The Actress"		Co-writer, Co-producer
2024	Rayelle	"Once I Feel Like This"	Happy Owl Records	Co-writer, producer
2024	Joey Hendricks	"Lonely Season"		Co-writer, producer
2024	Alli Walker	"I Like Big Trucks"	RECORDS	Co-writer
2024	Lane Brothers	"NOLA"	Big Yellow Dog	Co-writer, producer
2024	Joey Hendricks	"Doses"		Co-writer, producer
2024	Redferrin	"Champagne In the Morning"	Sony Music Entertainment	Co-writer, producer
2023	Joey Hendricks	"Brother"		Co-writer, producer
2023	Scott Helman	"Collarbone"	Warner Music Canada	Co-writer, Co-producer
2023	Anna Graceman	"Diamonds Never Die"		Co-writer, producer
2023	The Reklaws and Drake Milligan	"Honky Tonkin' About"	Starseed Records	Co-writer, producer
2023	ROZES	"Happy to See You Sad"		Co-writer, Producer
2023	Jake Rose	"Something Like That"	Starts With Music	Co-writer, Co-producer
2023	Brett Kissel	"Never Have I Ever"	Big Star Recordings	Co-writer, producer
2023	ROZES	"Used To Love You"		Co-writer, Producer
2022	Adam Hambrick	"Wreck Me Again"	Tree Street Records	Co-writer, Producer
2022	Caitlyn Smith	"Downtown Baby"	Monument Records / Sony Music Entertainment	Co-writer
2022	Fefe Dobson	"FCKN IN LOVE"	21 Entertainment Inc.	Producer
2022	DES3ETT & Serena Ryder	"Killing The Pain"	Universal Music B.V.	Co-writer
2022	Dean Brody	"Where'd You Learn How to Do That	Starseed Records	Co-writer
2022	Johnny Orlando	"terrible person"	Universal Music Canada	Co-writer
2021	The Reklaws	"Happy Hours"	Starseed Records	Co-writer
2021	Scott Helman	"Pretty"	Warner Music Canada	Co-writer, co-producer
2021	Alyssa Bonagura	"New Wings"	ABON MUSIC	Co-writer, co-producer
2021	Breagh Isabel	"Girlfriends"	--	Producer
2021	Scott Helman	"Good Problems (Remix)" ("Good Problems," "Good Problems - Remix")	Warner Music Canada	Co-writer, co-producer
2020	Serena Ryder	"Better Now" ("Waterfall," "Candy")	Serenader Source / ArtHaus	Co-writer, co-producer
2020	Walk Off The Earth	"this is love"	Golden Carrot Records	Co-writer
2020	The Reklaws	"So Crazy It Just Might Work"	Universal Music Canada	Co-writer
2020	Scott Helman	"Nonsuch Park (sa)" ("Wait No More," "Everything Sucks," "Lois," "Good Problems," "EVERGREEN," "True Crime," "Papa")	Warner Music Canada	Co-writer, co-producer
2020	Washboard Union	"Everbound" ("If She Only Knew," "Dock Rock")	Warner Music Canada	Co-writer, co-producer
2020	Ria Mae	"For Your Love"	--	Co-writer, producer
2019	Walk Off The Earth	"HERE WE GO!" ("HERE WE GO! (Overtime))	Golden Carrot Records	Co-producer
2019	Madison Kozak	"Household"	Big Loud Records	Co-writer
2019	Chad Brownlee	"The Way You Roll"	Universal Music Canada	Co-writer
2019	Hunter Hayes	"Visualizer" ("Heartbreak")	Atlantic Records	Co-writer
2018	Chad Brownlee	"single" ("Dear Drunk Me")	Universal Music Canada	Co-writer
2018	Scott Helman	"Hang Ups EP" ("Hang Ups", "Dostoevsky")	Warner Music Canada	Co-writer, producer
2018	Dear Rouge	Phases ("Live Through the Night," "Stolen Days," "Little by Little," "The Clearing," "Motion")	Universal Music Canada	Co-writer, co-producer (except "Motion")
2017	Scott Helman	Hotel De Ville (all tracks)	Warner Music Canada	Co-writer, producer
2017	Justin Nozuka	High Tide EP ("No Place in Mind")	Glassnote Records	Co-writer
2017	Mother Mother	No Culture ("The Drugs")	Universal Music Canada, Def Jam	Co-writer
2017	Walk Off the Earth	"Nomad," "Fire in My Soul," "Taekwondo"	Columbia Records	Co-writer, co-producer
2017	Serena Ryder	Utopia ("Electric Love," "Sanctuary," "Firewater," "Ice Age," "Hands," "Wolves," "Utopia")	Universal Music Canada	Co-writer, producer
2017	Alan Doyle	A Week at the Warehouse ("Summer Summer Night," "Beautiful to Me")		Co-writer
2016	Chantal Kreviazuk	Hard Sail ("Into Me," "Hard Sail, "All I Got")	Warner Music Canada	Co-writer, producer
2016	USS	New World Alphabet ("Work Shoes," Who's With Me," "Domino," "California Medication," "Broken Smile")	Coalition Music	Co-writer, co-producer
2016	Trevor Guthrie	"Wanted"	Interscope Records	Co-writer, producer
2016	Modern Space	Before Sunrise	Warner Music Canada	Co-writer, producer
2016	The Abrams	"Fine"	Warner Music Canada	Co-producer
2016	Lights	Midnight Machines ("Up We Go," "Same Sea," "Meteorites")	Warner Bros.	Co-writer
2015	Trevor Guthrie	"Summertime"	Interscope Records	Co-writer, producer
2015	Steve Aoki	Neon Future II ("Home We'll Go (Take My Hand)")	Ultra, Dim Mak	Co-writer
2015	Walk Off the Earth	Sing It All Away ("Rule the World," "I'll Be Waiting," "Home We'll Go," "Hold On," "Sing It All Away," "California Trees," "Heart is a Weapon")	Columbia Records	Co-writer, co-producer
2015	Alan Doyle	So Let's Go ("So Let's Go," "Take Us Home," "I Can't Dance Without You," "The Night Loves Us," "1234")	Universal Music Canada	Co-writer, producer
2015	The Tenors	Under One Sky ("A New Days Begun," "Lean on Me")	Universal Music Canada	Co-writer, co-producer ("A New Days Begun"), programming ("Lean on Me")
2014	Lights	Little Machines ("Up We Go," "Same Sea," "Meteorites," "Oil and Water," "Slow Down")	Warner Bros.	Co-writer, additional production
2014	Scott Helman	Augusta EP (all songs except "Somewhere Sweet")	Warner Music Canada	Co-writer, producer
2014	USS	Advanced Basics	Coalition Music Records	Co-writer, co-producer
2014	R3hab and Trevor Guthrie	"Soundwave"	Spinnin' Records	Co-writer
2013	Josh Groban	All That Echoes ("Brave," "Below the Line," "Un Alma Mas," "Happy in My Heartache)	143, Reprise	Co-writer
2013	Josh Groban	"Your Hideaway"	143, Reprise	Co-writer
2013	Lenka	Shadows ("Nothing Here But Love")	Skipalong Records	Co-writer
2013	Walk Off the Earth	R.E.V.O. ("Red Hands," "Gang of Rhythm," "Speeches," "Sometimes," "Shake," "Summer Vibe")	Columbia Records	Co-writer, co-producer
2013	Lights	Siberia Acoustic ("Banner," "Where the Fence is Low," "Suspension," "Toes," "Heavy Rope," "Flux and Flow")	Universal, Last Gang	Co-writer
2012	The Tenors	Lead With Your Heart ("Forever Young")	Universal Music Canada	Programming
2012	Jesse Labelle ft. Alyssa Reid	"Heartbreak Coverup"	Wax Records	Co-writer, producer
2012	Newworldson	Rebel Transmission ("Learning to be the Light")	Inpop	Co-writer, producer
2011	Lights	Siberia ("Banner," "Where the Fence is Low," "Suspension," "Toes," "Heavy Rope," "Flux and Flow," "Timing is Everything")	Universal, Last Gang	Co-writer, co-producer
2011	USS	Approved ("Yo Hello Hooray," "Damini," "Heaven on Mars," "Prefontaine," "N/A OK")	Smashing World Records Records	Co-writer, co-producer
2010	Fefe Dobson	Joy ("Can't Breathe")	Island Records	Co-writer
2010	Newworldson	Newworldson ("There is a Way")	Inpop Records	Co-writer, co-producer
2010	Josh Groban	Illuminations ("Higher Window")	143, Reprise	Co-writer
2010	Joe Cocker	Hard Knocks ("So")	Columbia, Savoy Label Group	Co-writer
2009	Lights	The Listening ("Savior," "Drive My Soul," "River," "Ice," "Face Up," "Lions")	Universal Canada, Sire	Co-writer, co-producer
2008	Lenka	Lenka ("Don't Let Me Fall," "Double is a Friend")	Epic Records	Co-writer
2006	Josh Groban	Awake ("You Are Loved," "Awake")	143, Reprise	Co-writer ("Awake"), writer & co-producer ("You Are Loved")

== Awards and nominations ==
Year	Nominee / work	Award	Result
2018	Thomas "Tawgs" Salter	Juno Awards - Producer of the Year	Nominated
2017	Serena Ryder - "Electric Love"	SOCAN Awards - No. 1 Song Award	Won
2017	Mother Mother - "The Drugs"	SOCAN Awards - No. 1 Song Award	Won
2016	Scott Helman - "Bungalow"	SOCAN Awards - Pop/Rock Music	Won
2016	Trevor Guthrie - "Summertime"	SOCAN Awards - Dance Music	Won
2016	Thomas "Tawgs" Salter	Juno Awards - Producer of the Year	Nominated
2015	Thomas "Tawgs" Salter	Juno Awards - Producer of the Year	Nominated
2015	Lights - Little Machines	Juno Awards - Pop Album of the Year	Won
2014	Walk Off the Earth - "Red Hands"	SOCAN Awards - Pop/Rock Music	Won
2014	Thomas "Tawgs" Salter	Juno Awards - Producer of the Year	Nominated
2013	Newworldson - "Learning To Be The Light"	ASCAP Christian Music Awards	Won
2012	Fefe Dobson - "Can't Breathe"	SOCAN Awards - Pop/Rock Music	Won
