= Lights (musician) =

Canadian musician (born 1987)

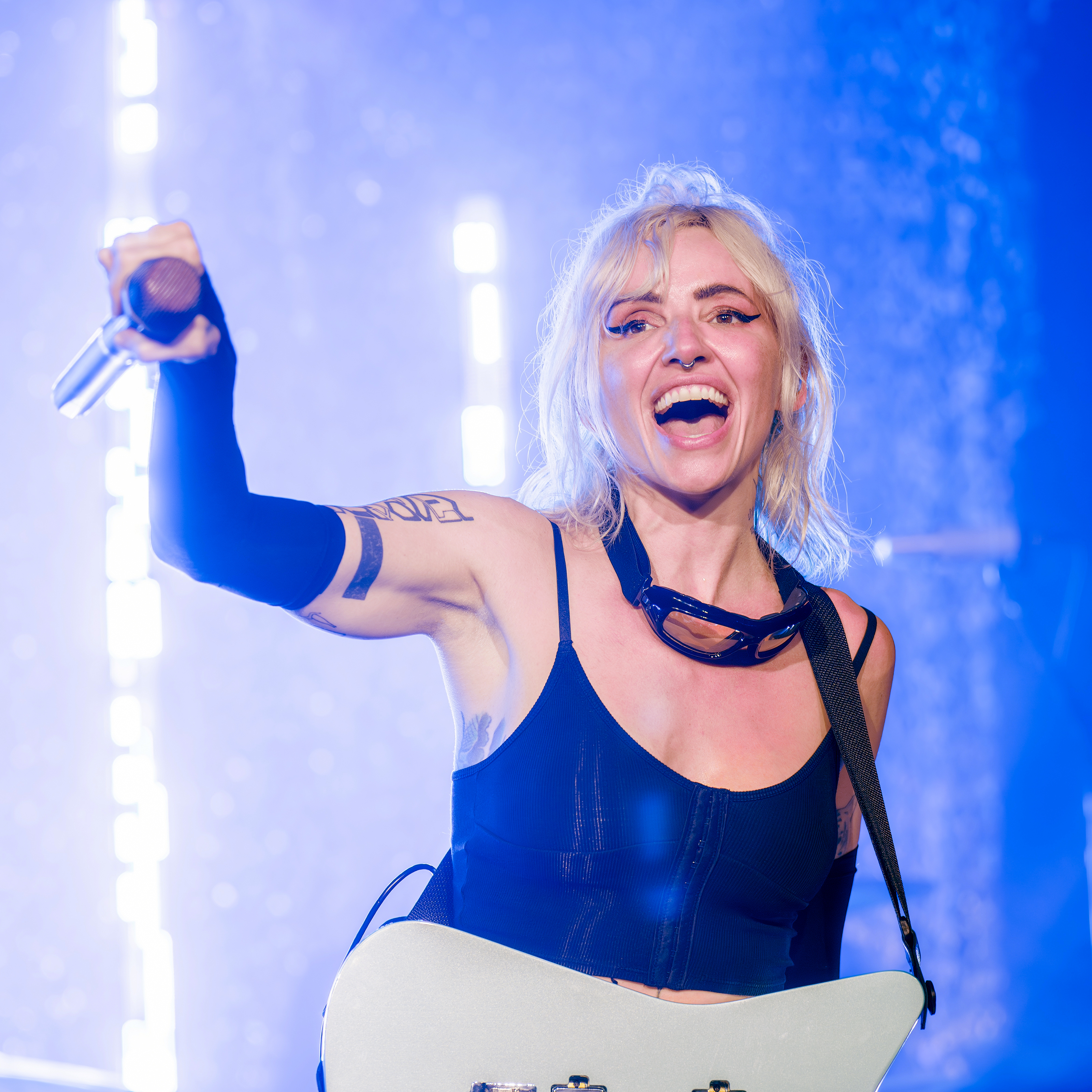
- Lights in 2025

Background information
- Born: Valerie Anne Poxleitner; April 11, 1987 (age 39); Timmins, Ontario, Canada
- Genres: Electropop; synth-pop; electronic rock
- Occupations: Singer; songwriter; illustrator; author
- Instruments: Vocals; synthesizer; keytar; guitar; piano
- Years active: 2001–present
- Labels: Underground; Doghouse; Sire; Lights Music; Universal; Warner Bros.; Last Gang; Mau5trap; Fueled by Ramen
- Spouse: Beau Bokan (m. 2012)
- Website: www.iamlights.com

Lights Valerie Anne Poxleitner-Bokan (born Valerie Anne Poxleitner; April 11, 1987) known professionally as Lights is a Canadian singer and songwriter. Her debut album, The Listening (2009), reached the top 10 on the Billboard Canadian Albums chart and was certified platinum by the Canadian Recording Industry Association (CRIA) for selling over 80,000 copies as of 2017. The album included the singles "Drive My Soul" and "February Air" which were featured in a series of Old Navy television ads. Her second album, Siberia, which featured the single "Toes", was released in 2011. A more dubstep influenced record, Siberia has received generally positive reviews from music critics and achieved moderate success, entering the top 50 on the Billboard 200 and selling more than 10,000 units in its first week.

Her work has earned multiple Canadian Independent Music Awards, and Juno Awards including Pop Album of the Year for her third album Little Machines, which included the single "Up We Go", and fourth album Skin & Earth, in 2015 and 2018, respectively. Lights's fifth studio album, Pep, was released in 2022. Her newest record A6 was released May 2, 2025.

== Biography ==
=== 1987–2007: early years ===
Valerie Anne Poxleitner was born on April 11, 1987, to missionary parents Virginia and Eric Poxleitner. She has one older sister, Jess. She spent her childhood in many parts of the world, including the Philippines, Jamaica, and Chesley, Ontario. She was home-schooled by her mother, and was taught guitar by her father. Lights produced her first song "Saturn's Rings" with an eight-track recorder she purchased with inheritance money from her grandmother in 2001.

"Lights has always been my nickname for starters and it does come out of my last name. It's kind of what people have been calling me for so long and it totally explains what my music is about, it's about lightening people's moods and stuff. I’ve always loved writing L's and my real name does not start with an L."

— Lights, 2008 interview

In high school, Lights played the guitar and sang in the metal band Shovel Face and accumulated a following through her Myspace page. She moved to Toronto at the age of 18 and changed her name to Lights, a nickname derived from her surname. Although there was already a signed band named "Lights", officially changing her name allowed her to use it despite the prior claim.

Lights began her music career writing for Sony/ATV Music Publishing and composed music for the CTV television series Instant Star. She and Luke McMaster are credited with composing "Perfect", sung by Alexz Johnson in the role of Jude Harrison. In 2007, she contracted with Jian Ghomeshi, who acted as her manager until late 2014.

=== 2008–2013: The Listening and Siberia ===
In early 2008, Lights toured cities in the Great Lakes region, in Canada and the United States. Around the same time, her song "Drive My Soul" rose to No. 18 on the Canadian Hot 100 chart. In late 2008, she toured the United States. In August 2008, Lights signed a record deal with Toronto-based label Underground Operations and an American partnership deal with Warner Bros. and Doghouse Records. Her self-titled EP was released on iTunes in July and on vinyl in September. Her second single, "February Air", which had been used in a commercial for Old Navy in early 2008, was released in December and sold about 12,000 copies. She released a third single, "Ice", accompanied by a homemade video in March 2009.

The commercial success of the EP and its singles enabled Lights to release the full-length album The Listening in September 2009. She promoted the album with the August 10 release of a music video for "Saviour", the first single from the album. The single was released on September 22 in Canada. Its US release was held until October 6 while she left Underground Operations for her own record label, Lights Music Inc. Lights re-recorded "Ice" for the new album and released a new video on November 10. According to Lights, the artwork for the album cover was inspired by Watchmen, 28 Days Later, and Sailor Moon. Lights won the 2009 Juno Award for New Artist of the Year. The Listening sold more than 80,000 copies and was certified gold in Canada. In September 2009, Lights toured with the British band Keane on their Canadian/Pacific Northwest tour. She also contributed vocals to Ten Second Epic's song "Every Day". Its music video was nominated for Best Independent Music Video at the 2010 MuchMusic Video Awards. She is also featured on the soundtrack (songs "Ben" and "Climbing") for the 2008 Canadian film One Week, starring Joshua Jackson. She was a guest vocalist on the album A Shipwreck in the Sand, released in 2009 by post-hardcore band Silverstein from Burlington, Ontario.

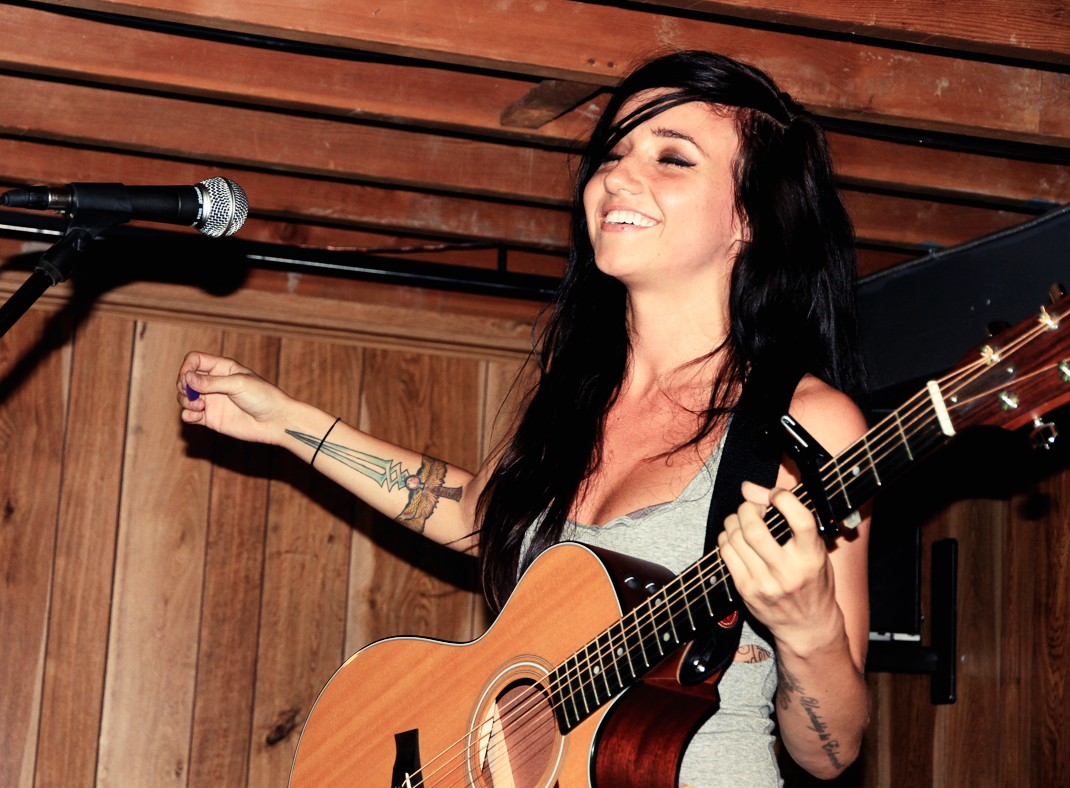
Lights performing in Toronto at Sonic Boom Records, 2010

From January to May 2010, she toured with contemporary synthpop artist Owl City in Canada, the United States, and Europe. Lights released an acoustic EP titled Acoustic in July 2010, with a special performance at the University of Waterloo, where she had received most of her inspiration for the album. Later that month, she began a six-date US tour. In September, she joined Hedley for the eight-show Ontario leg of their Canadian tour. Lights appeared as a guest vocalist on the songs "Crucify Me" and "Don't Go" of Bring Me the Horizon's 2010 album There Is a Hell Believe Me I've Seen It. There Is a Heaven Let's Keep It a Secret. and on The Secret Handshake's song "Used to be Sweet". In October 2010, Lights released the digital single "My Boots" and began a concert tour with Jeremy Fisher. At a November show in Toronto, she was presented a trophy by the Canadian Recording Industry Association for The Listening's gold certification, having then achieved 40,000 units in sales.

At the June 2011 Utopia Music Festival, Lights performed three new songs, "Toes", "Where the Fence is Low", and "Everybody Breaks a Glass". The first of these songs was released as a single in August, to promote her second studio album, Siberia. She had signed with Last Gang Records, and concerns by label executives about her shift in style to a more gritty sound delayed the album's release to October 4 in Canada and the US, and later that month in Australia. Siberia received positive reviews and was nominated for a Juno Award for Best Pop Album of the Year. It debuted at No. 3 on the Canadian Albums Chart, and sold more than 10,000 units in its first week. Sales surpassed 40,000 and the album was certified gold in Canada on April 27, 2012. She was also featured in "The Yacht Club" on Owl City's 2011 album All Things Bright and Beautiful, and appeared in his music video for "Deer in the Headlights".

In March 2013, Lights released an acoustic version of "Cactus in the Valley", featuring Owl City, as a single in the UK. Siberia Acoustic was released in April 2013, and reached No. 7 in Canada. She toured North America in support of the album, with Dear Rouge opening some dates and Lianne La Havas opening others.

=== 2014–2019: Little Machines and Skin & Earth ===
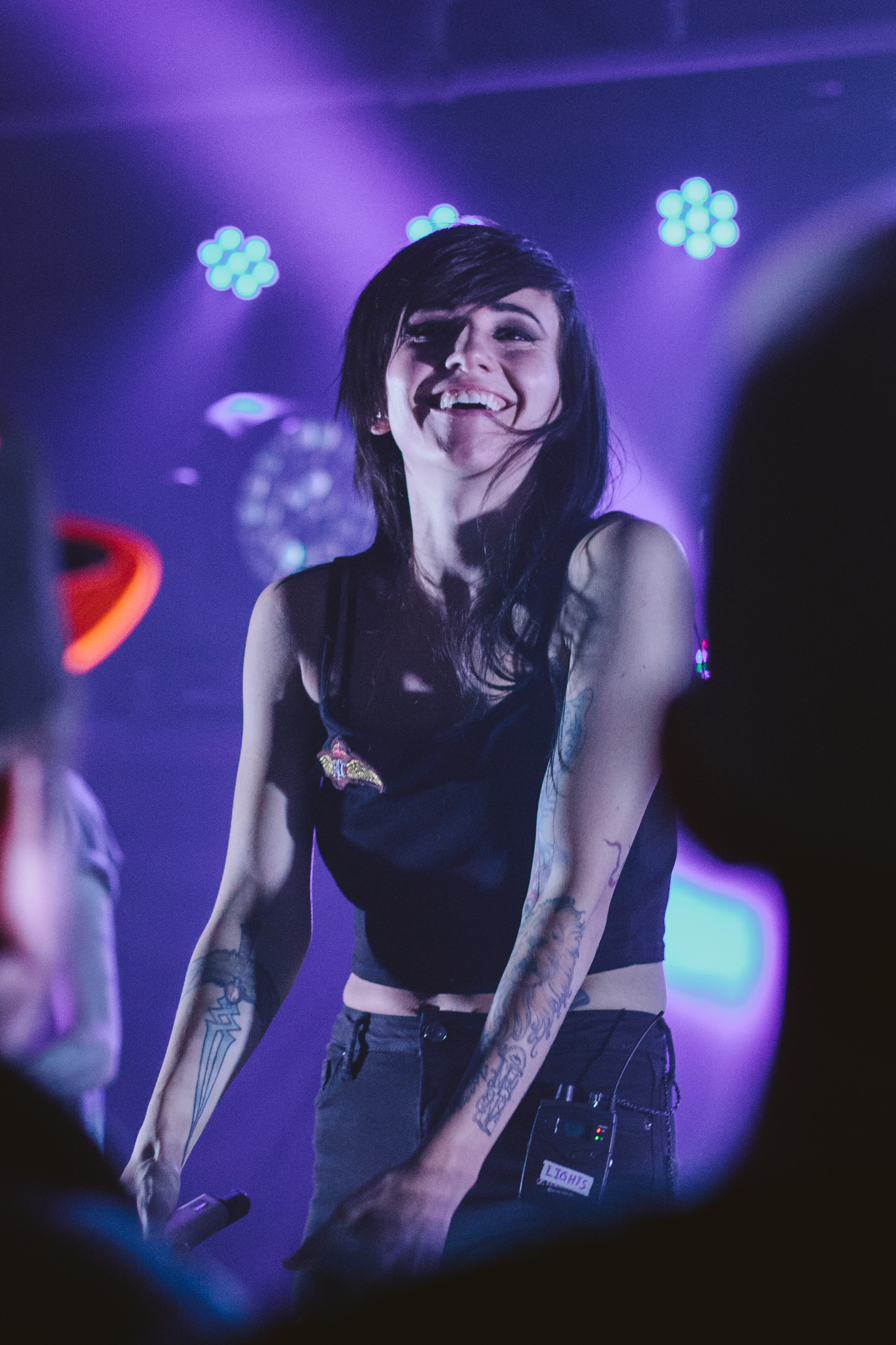
Lights live at the NorVA 2015

In July 2014, Lights's third studio album, Little Machines, became available for pre-order on iTunes with its lead single, "Up We Go", available to download. The album was released on September 23 in the US and Canada. It debuted at No. 5 in Canada. "Running with the Boys" received radio play in early 2015 as the second official single, while "Portal" and "Same Sea" received promotional releases. In October, Lights parted ways with her long-time manager Ghomeshi.

Lights continued touring extensively in support of Little Machines into 2015. On April 8, 2016, she released the acoustic EP Midnight Machines, which included acoustic versions of six songs from Little Machines and two new songs: "Follow You Down" and "Head Cold". Lights and her band were featured in the 2016 video game LOUD on Planet X, as character avatars and with their songs "Same Sea" and "Up We Go".

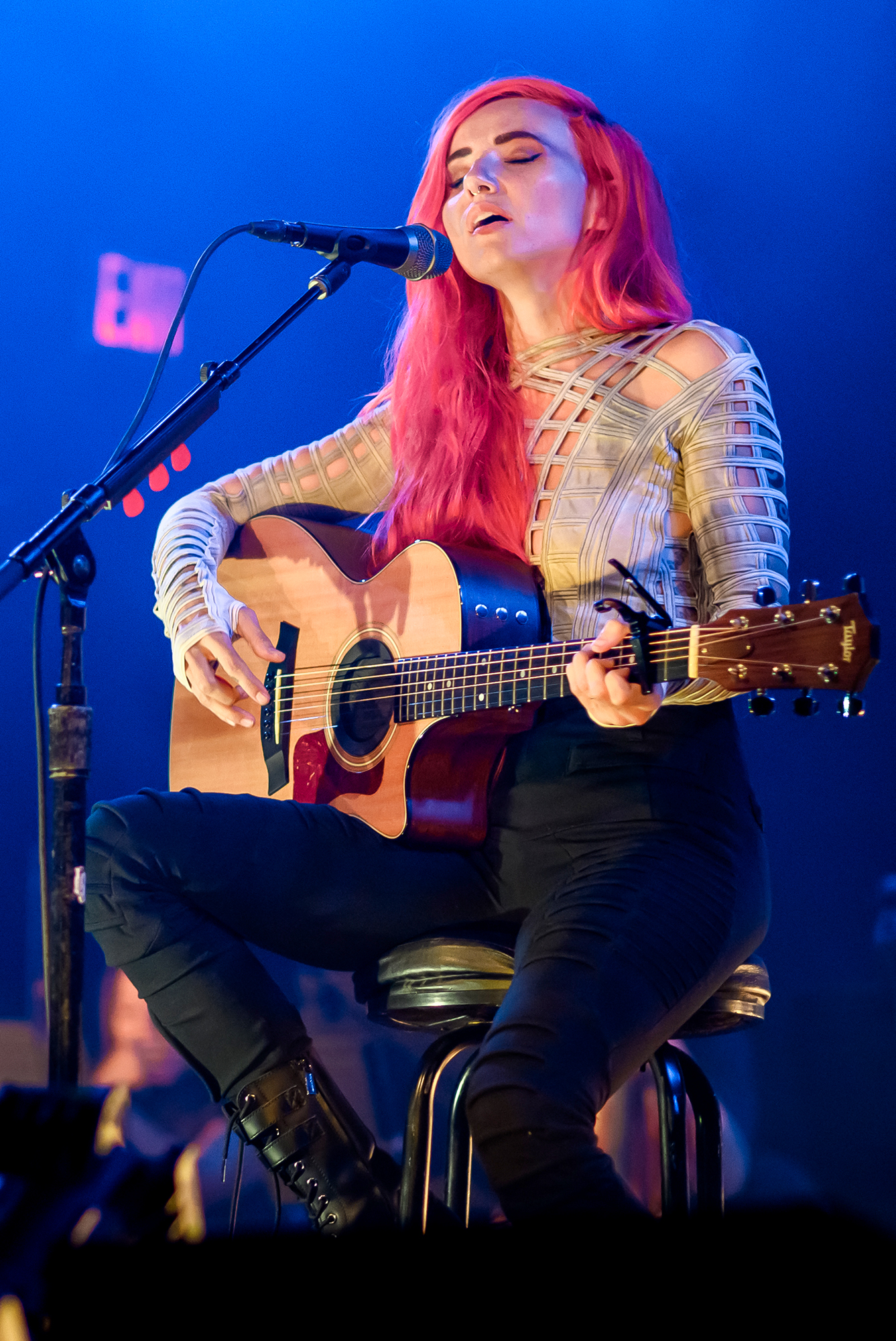
Lights performing live in Los Angeles, California, on August 10, 2019

In April 2017, Lights announced the forthcoming release of her fourth studio album, Skin & Earth. The album was released with a comic book series drawn and written by Lights, one song per issue, starting in July. New music was released with each edition on a monthly basis until the album was released in full. Twenty One Pilots drummer Josh Dun collaborated on the album tracks "Savage" and "Almost Had Me". The song "Giants" and its accompanying music video were released on June 23. The song peaked at No. 18 on the Billboard Adult Top 40 chart. She later released versions of the song in French, Japanese, Tagalog and Spanish. On July 14, Lights released the promotional single "Skydiving". The album was made available for pre-orders on August 11 and was released on September 22, 2017. Lights released the song "Savage" on August 11, followed by "New Fears" on September 15, 2017. The album track "Fight Club" is featured in the video game Just Dance 2018.

In January 2018, Lights launched the "We Were Here Tour" with Chase Atlantic and DCF, playing 46 shows across North America in support of the album. On February 2, Lights released the music video for her song "We Were Here". She joined Young the Giant's fall tour in October as the supporting act. In November 2018, Lights collaborated with Deadmau5 on his track "Drama Free", which was released on his Mau5ville: Level 2 EP. In early 2019, she collaborated with Felix Cartal on the track "Love Me" and with Sleepy Tom on the track "Amateurs". On May 12, 2019, it was announced that she had signed to Fueled by Ramen, which would release Skin&Earth Acoustic supported by a North American concert tour. The acoustic album was released on July 12 with three new songs.

=== 2020–2023: Pep and dEd ===
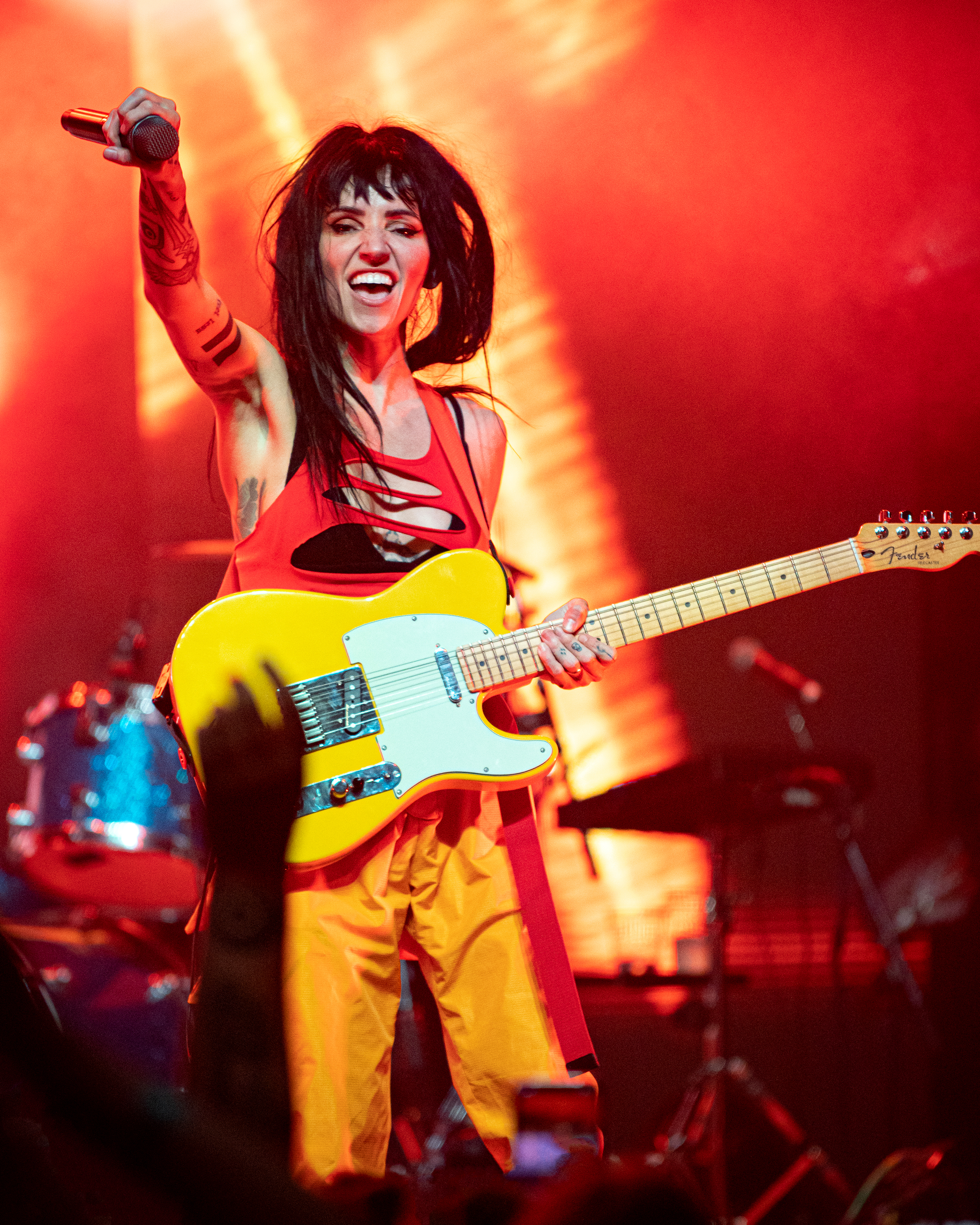
Lights live at The Fonda Theatre 2022

On June 11, 2020, Lights released a seven-track instrumental synthwave album on Bandcamp titled How to Sleep When You're on Fire. Proceeds from this album would be donated to the Black Lives Matter Vancouver branch. On July 9, 2020, Lights released the song "Dead End", alongside its music video. The song was part of a remix EP of the same name, released in collaboration with MYTH on August 7.

In 2021, Lights began releasing music under the pseudonym Lūn, a character that appeared in her Skin & Earth comic in 2017, explaining "Lūn is a musician in the Skin&Earth universe. Though she is never actually mentioned, she appears all through the comic." The EP titled haha i like it was released by Lūn in April 2021. That same month, Lights released the song "Beside Myself".

In October, she released "Prodigal Daughter" as the lead single from her album Pep, released on April 1, 2022. On November 16, 2021, in support of the album, Lights announced she would begin her "Baby I'm Back Tour" starting with shows in the US throughout the month of April and May 2022. She ended the tour with a leg of shows in Canada from late January to February 2023. In November, her album Warehouse Summer with i_o was released after his death. In April 2023, she released a re-imagined chillwave version of Pep titled dEd.

=== 2024–present: A6 ===
On February 9, 2024, Felix Cartal and Lights released another track together, titled "Feel Less". She also appeared on the PVRIS track "The Blob", released June 20, 2024. It was announced that Lights would be appearing at the inaugural All Your Friends festival in Burls Creek, ON, on August 24, 2024 alongside artists like Billy Talent and Silverstein. Lights also appeared at several shows of Deadmau5's retro5pective tour, celebrating 25 years of his career. She also teased on her social media clips of her working on new music in Berlin, Germany.

A new single, "Damage", was released on September 27, 2024. Alongside the release, she released a video featuring her cutting her hair off to shoulder length, after years of having longer distinct hairstyles. Lights performed on September 28, 2024 at the Canadian Songwriters Hall of Fame Induction Ceremony at Massey Hall, honouring inductee Sarah McLachlan, where she covered Sarah's track "Building A Mystery".

Lights announced her sixth record, A6, would be released on May 2, 2025. She also released a second single from the record, "Alive Again", on February 7, 2025. "Alive Again" is Lights's first track to chart on the Modern Rock charts in Canada. Interacting music videos were put out alongside the singles "Surface Tension" and "White Paper Palm Trees" on April 4, 2025, ahead of the record's release. A tour across North America in support of the record began on May 8, 2025 in Victoria, BC. All the tour dates sold out before a summer of festival dates, including Calgary Stampede, and Halifax Music Festival.

On January 30, 2026, Lights released A6EXTENDED, an extended version of A6 featuring 8 new songs. The Come Get Your Girl Tour kicked off on February 13, 2026 in Edmonton, AB. Also in 2026 Lights opened several shows for Bryan Adams on the Canadian leg of his Roll With The Punches world tour.

== Musical style and influences ==
Lights is known for her electropop and contemporary synth-pop tunes. Her musical style has been described as electropop, electronic rock and synth-pop. Lights described her own music as an "electronic landscape of moody sunset times". The Listening was characterized as gentle indie-electronic alt-rock. Siberia was characterized by a "heavier" sound than her previous works. Allmusic's review of Little Machines described it as a "mature, electro-punk affair that proved Lights had grown beyond the twee, synth-and-folk artist she started out as." Lights stated that her artistic influences were Björk, Genesis and Supertramp.

== Awards and nominations ==
Year	Organization	Work	Award	Result	Ref.
2009	Juno Awards	–	New Artist of the Year	Won	
2009	MuchMusic Video Awards	–	UR Fave: New Artist of the Year	Nominated	
2009	MuchMusic Video Awards	"Drive My Soul"	Pop Video of the Year	Nominated	
2009	Canadian Radio Music Awards	"Drive My Soul"	Best New Group/Solo Artist: Hot AC Song	Won	
2009	Canadian Radio Music Awards	"Drive My Soul"	Best New Group/Solo Artist: CHR Song	Nominated	
2009	Canadian Radio Music Awards	"Drive My Soul"	Best New Group/Solo Artist: Mainstream AC Song	Nominated	
2009	Canadian Independent Music Awards	"Drive My Soul"	Favourite Single	Won	
2009	Canadian Independent Music Awards	–	Favourite Pop Artist/Group	Nominated	
2009	Canadian Independent Music Awards	–	Favourite Solo Artist	Won	
2010	Canadian Independent Music Awards	"Drive My Soul"	Favourite Video	Nominated	
2010	Canadian Independent Music Awards	–	Favourite Pop Artist	Nominated	
2010	Juno Awards	The Listening	Pop Album of the Year	Nominated	
2012	Juno Awards	Siberia	Pop Album of the Year	Nominated	
2012	MuchMusic Video Awards	"Banner"	MuchFACT Video of the Year	Nominated	
2012	MuchMusic Video Awards	"Toes"	MuchMusic.com Most Streamed Video	Nominated	
2015	Juno Awards	Little Machines	Pop Album of the Year	Won	
2015	MuchMusic Video Awards	"Running with the Boys"	Pop Video of the Year	Nominated	
2015	MuchMusic Video Awards	"Running with the Boys"	MuchFACT Video of the Year	Nominated	
2016	Canadian Independent Music Awards	–	Artist of the Year	Nominated	
2018	Juno Awards	Skin & Earth	Pop Album of the Year	Won	
2018	Juno Awards	–	Artist of the Year	Nominated	
2020	Juno Awards	"Love Me" (with Felix Cartal)	Dance Recording of the Year	Won	
2023	Juno Awards	PEP	Album Artwork of the Year	Nominated	

== Personal life ==
In 2010, Lights was introduced to Beau Bokan, the lead vocalist of metalcore band Blessthefall, at a Taking Back Sunday concert in Los Angeles, and they quickly started dating. After becoming engaged in September 2011, they were married on May 12, 2012, and Lights added "Bokan" to her last name (now stylized as Poxleitner-Bokan). They received matching tattoos to commemorate their wedding date. Lights gave birth to their first child, a daughter, on February 15, 2014.

In December 2017, Lights came out as bisexual during an interview with People magazine.

The liner notes for The Listening thank, among others: "Jesus for giving me everything I have" as well as Skate4Cancer and Wonder Woman. In a Twitter post in 2022, Lights clarified that she no longer identifies as religious.

== Discography ==
- The Listening (2009)
- Siberia (2011)
- Little Machines (2014)
- Skin & Earth (2017)
- Pep (2022)
- A6 (2025)

== Books ==
- Skin&Earth: Volume one (2017 graphic novel)
- Skin&Earth: Volume two (2017 graphic novel)
- Skin&Earth: Volume three (2017 graphic novel)
- Skin&Earth: Volume four (2017 graphic novel)
- Skin&Earth: Volume five (2017 graphic novel)
- Skin&Earth: Volume six (2017 graphic novel)
- The Clinic: A Skin&Earth Side Story (2022)

== Filmography ==
Year	Title	Role	Notes
2010	The City	Herself	Season 2, episode 10
2011	Epic Meal Time	Herself	Episode: "Fast Food Meatloaf (And LIGHTS is here too)"
2018	Talking Dead	Herself	Season 7, episode 21
2019	#NoJoke	Herself	Documentary
2020	The Magic School Bus Rides Again	Maven	Voice role; episode: "In the Zone"
