= Lights discography =

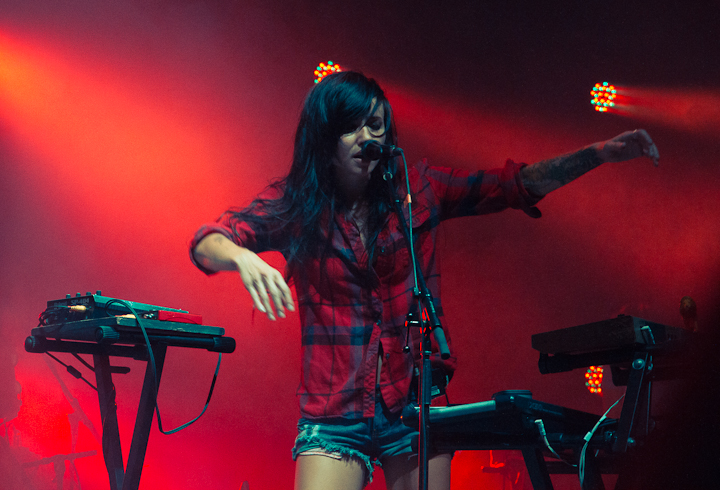
- Lights performing at the Canadian National Exhibition in Toronto in 2011
- Studio albums: 6
- Extended plays: 8
- Singles: 39
- Music videos: 30
- Acoustic albums: 3

Canadian singer and songwriter Lights has released six studio albums, three acoustic albums, eight extended plays, 39 singles (including 10 as a featured artist and two as part of a supergroup), and 30 music videos. Lights began her career as a songwriter, penning songs for the television series Instant Star. She released a self-titled EP in 2008 on the independent record label Underground Operations. Two singles, "Drive My Soul" and "February Air", were released from the EP: "Drive My Soul" reached number 18 on the Canadian singles chart and was certified gold by Music Canada (MC).

Lights' debut studio album, The Listening, was released in September 2009. It reached number seven on the Canadian albums chart and was certified gold by MC. Three singles were released from the album: "Saviour", "Ice" and "Second Go". In early 2010, Lights collaborated with various Canadian musicians on the charity single "Wavin' Flag" which reached number one in Canada and was certified triple platinum by MC.

Siberia, her second studio album, was released in October 2011. Featuring collaborations with Holy Fuck and Shad, it peaked at number three in Canada and was certified gold by MC. The album produced three singles, "Everybody Breaks a Glass", "Toes" and "Where the Fence Is Low". An acoustic album, Siberia Acoustic, followed in April 2013. Preceded by the single "Cactus in the Valley" with Owl City, the album reached number seven in Canada.

Her third studio album, Little Machines, was released in September 2014, and debuted at number five in Canada. It has spawned two official singles, the top-40 peaking lead single "Up We Go" and "Running with the Boys", as well as two promotional singles "Portal" and "Same Sea". In 2017, Lights released her fourth studio album, Skin & Earth, which debuted at number three on the Canadian albums chart. Its lead single, "Giants", became the first song of Lights' career to chart in the United States, peaking in the top 20 of the Adult Pop Songs airplay chart.

On June 11, 2020, she released a seven track instrumental synthwave album on Bandcamp titled How to Sleep When You're on Fire. Proceeds from this album would be donated to the Black Lives Matter Vancouver branch.

Pep, her fifth studio album, was released on April 1, 2022. Breaking her usual pattern of releasing an acoustic version of the album, Lights released the lofi album Ded on April 7, 2023. Ded featured lofi versions of Pep's tracks, presenting them in reverse order.

A6, her sixth studio album, was released on May 2, 2025. The title is a shorter version of "Album 6" and serves as her album of reflection and rediscovery of her music. An extended edition of A6, A6Extended was released on January 30, 2026.

== Albums ==
=== Studio albums ===
List of studio albums, with selected chart positions, sales figures and certifications
Title	Album details	Peak chart positions				Certifications	Sales
Title	Album details	CAN	GRC	US	US Sales (Note: In 2014, the Billboard 200 was changed from a ranking albums by pure sales to also include streaming. Top Album Sales was created at that time to preserve the original methodology.)	Certifications	Sales
The Listening	Released: September 22, 2009 (CAN); Labels: Sire, Universal (0252712881); Formats: CD, DD	7	34	129	129	MC: Platinum	
Siberia	Released: October 4, 2011 (CAN); Labels: Universal, Last Gang (Q201356); Formats: CD, DD, LP	3	—	47	47	MC: Gold	CAN: 40,000
Little Machines	Released: September 23, 2014 (CAN); Labels: Universal, Warner Bros.; Formats: CD, DD, LP	5	—	34	34	MC: Gold	
Skin & Earth	Released: September 22, 2017; Labels: Universal, Warner Bros.; Formats: CD, DD, LP	3	—	95	33		
Pep	Released: April 1, 2022; Labels: Fueled by Ramen; Formats: CD, DD, LP	32	—	— (Note: "Pep" did not enter the Billboard 200 chart, but peaked at number 25 on the Top Album Sales chart.)	25		
A6	Released: May 2, 2025; Labels: Lights Music Inc.; Formats: CD, DD, LP	—	—	—	—		
"—" denotes a recording that did not chart or was not released in that territory.

=== Acoustic and re-imagined albums ===
List of acoustic albums and re-imagined albums, with selected chart positions
Title	Album details	Peak chart positions	
Title	Album details	CAN	US
Siberia Acoustic	Released: April 30, 2013 (CAN); Labels: Universal, Last Gang (Q201460); Formats: CD, LP, DD	7	86
Skin & Earth Acoustic	Released: July 12, 2019; Label: Fueled by Ramen; Formats: CD, LP, DD	—	—
Ded	Released April 7, 2023; Label: Fueled by Ramen; Formats: CD, LP, DD	—	—
"—" denotes a recording that did not chart or was not released in that territory.

=== Other albums ===
Title	Description	Notes
Scorpion Side B (Covers)	Cover album of Drake's Scorpions	Released: August 10, 2018 (US); Label: Last Gang; Format: DD
Warehouse Summer	Collaborative album (with i_o)	Released: November 23, 2022; Labels: Armada; Formats: DD

== Extended plays ==
List of extended plays, with selected chart positions
Title	Extended play details	Peak chart positions	
Title	Extended play details	CAN	US
Lights	Released: April 22, 2008 (CAN); Labels: Underground, Doghouse (UOPJ26); Formats: CD, LP, DD	—	—
Acoustic	Released: July 20, 2010 (CAN); Labels: Sire, Universal (0252743987); Formats: CD, DD	7	122
Siberia (Remixed)	Released: February 28, 2012 (CAN); Label: Last Gang; Format: DD	—	—
iTunes Session	Released: April 3, 2012 (CAN); Label: Universal; Format: DD	52	—
Midnight Machines	Released: April 8, 2016 (NZ); Label: Warner Bros.; Format: DD	9	104
AM 444 (with i_o)	Released: May 29, 2020 (US); Label: 720MAU5; Format: DD	—	—
How to Sleep When You're on Fire	Released: June 11, 2020; Labels: self-released; Formats: DD	—	—
Dead End (with Myth)	Released: August 7, 2020 (US); Label: Fueled by Ramen; Format: DD	—	—
"—" denotes a recording that did not chart or was not released in that territory.

== Singles ==
=== As lead artist ===
List of singles as lead artist, with selected chart positions and certifications, showing year released and album name
Title	Year	Peak chart positions							Certifications	Album
Title	Year	CAN	CAN AC	CAN Alt.	CAN CHR	CAN HAC	NLD	US Adult	Certifications	Album
"Drive My Soul"	2008	18	4	—	11	8	—	—	MC: Gold	Lights and The Listening
"February Air"	2008	90	35	—	—	—	—	—		Lights and The Listening
"Saviour"	2009	38	48	—	34	15	—	—	MC: Gold	The Listening
"Ice"	2009	65	—	—	29	39	—	—		The Listening
"Second Go"	2010	54	—	—	28	12	—	—		The Listening
"My Boots"	2010	56	—	—	—	30	—	—		Non-album single
"Everybody Breaks a Glass" (featuring Holy Fuck and Shad)	2011	79	—	—	—	—	—	—		Siberia
"Toes"	2011	62	49	—	—	—	— (Note: "Toes" did not enter the Dutch Top 40, but peaked at number 11 on the Dutch Tipparade chart, which acts as an extension to the Dutch Top 40.)	—		Siberia
"Where the Fence Is Low"	2012	—	—	—	—	—	—	—		Siberia
"Banner"	2012	—	—	—	—	—	—	—		Siberia
"Timing Is Everything"	2012	—	—	—	—	—	—	—		Siberia
"Cactus in the Valley" (acoustic) (featuring Owl City)	2013	—	—	—	—	—	—	—		Siberia Acoustic
"Up We Go"	2014	31	5	—	9	7	—	—	MC: Gold	Little Machines
"Running with the Boys"	2015	— (Note: "Running with the Boys" did not enter the Billboard Canadian Hot 100, but did reach number 64 on the Hot Canadian Digital Songs component chart.)	36	—	47	35	—	—		Little Machines
"Giants"	2017	—	18	—	—	14	—	18		Skin & Earth
"We Were Here"	2018	—	—	—	21	37	—	—		Skin & Earth
"Love Me" (with Felix Cartal)	2019	38	16	—	6	5	—	—	MC: 2× Platinum	Expensive Sounds for Nice People
"Lost Girls"	2019	—	—	—	—	—	—	—		Skin & Earth Acoustic
"Long Live" (featuring Travis Barker)	2019	—	—	—	—	—	—	—		Non-album single
"Annihilation" (with i_o)	2020	—	—	—	—	—	—	—		AM 444
"Dead End" (with Myth)	2020	—	—	—	—	—	—	—		Dead End
"Batshit" (with Myth)	2020	—	—	—	—	—	—	—		Dead End
"When the Summer Dies" (with Deadmau5)	2021	—	—	—	—	—	—	—		Non-album single
"Prodigal Daughter"	2021	—	—	—	—	—	—	—		Pep
"Real Thing" (featuring Elohim)	2021	—	—	—	—	—	—	—		Pep
"Salt and Vinegar"	2022	—	—	—	—	—	—	—		Pep
"In My Head" (featuring Josh Dun)	2022	—	—	—	—	—	—	—		Pep
"Someone to Forget" (with ARMNHMR)	2023	—	—	—	—	—	—	—		Together as One
"Feel Less" (with Felix Cartal)	2024	—	—	—	46	—	—	—		I, Sabotage
"The Blob" (with Pvris)	2024	—	—	—	—	—	—	—		F.I.L.T.H.
"Damage"	2024	—	—	—	—	—	—	—		A6 (Note: "Education", "Learning to Let Go", and "Come Get Your Girl" are only singles from A6Extended, the extended version of A6.)
"Alive Again"	2025	—	—	26	—	—	—	—		A6
"Surface Tension"	2025	—	—	—	—	—	—	—		A6
"White Paper Palm Trees"	2025	—	—	—	—	—	—	—		A6
"Clingy"	2025	—	—	—	—	—	—	—		A6
"Education"	2025	—	—	—	—	—	—	—		A6
"Learning to Let Go"	2025	—	—	—	—	—	—	—		A6
"Come Get Your Girl"	2026	—	—	—	—	—	—	—		A6
"—" denotes a recording that did not chart or was not released in that territory.

=== As featured artist ===
List of singles as a featured artist, with selected chart positions and certifications, showing year released and album name
Title	Year	Peak chart positions			Certifications	Album
Title	Year	CAN	TWN	US Dance	Certifications	Album
"Every Day" (Ten Second Epic featuring Lights)	2009	—	—	—		Hometown
"Wavin' Flag" (as part of Young Artists for Haiti)	2010	1	—	—	MC: 3× Platinum	Non-album singles
"True Colors" (as part of Artists Against Bullying)	2012	10	—	—		Non-album singles
"No One Knows Who We Are" (Kaskade and Swanky Tunes featuring Lights)	2013	—	—	34		Atmosphere
"Zero Gravity" (Borgeous featuring Lights)	2015	—	—	— (Note: "Zero Gravity" did not enter the Billboard Hot Dance/Electronic Songs chart, but did peak at number 16 on the Dance/Mix Show Airplay component chart.)		Non-album single
"Falling Away" (Seven Lions featuring Lights)	2015	—	—	49		Creation
"Warrior" (Steve James featuring Lights)	2017	—	—	—		Non-album single
"Drama Free" (Deadmau5 featuring Lights)	2018	—	—	46		Mau5ville: Level 2
"Amateurs" (Sleepy Tom featuring Lights)	2019	—	—	—		Amateurs
"Hearts on Fire" (Illenium and Dabin featuring Lights)	2020	—	32	11		Fallen Embers
"Last Summer" (Tokyo Machine and Weird Genius featuring Lights)	2021	—	—	—		Non-album single
"Dusk" (Manila Killa featuring Lights)	2022	—	—	—		Dusk
"Human Being" (Arkells featuring Lights)	2022	—	—	—		Blink Twice
"Stop Thinking" (Seven Lions featuring Lights)	2022	—	—	48		Beyond the Veil
"Empress of the Damned" (Gunship featuring Lights)	2023	—	—	—		Non-album single
"—" denotes a recording that did not chart or was not released in that territory.

=== Promotional singles ===
List of promotional singles, with selected chart positions
Title	Year	Peak positions	Album
Title	Year	CAN Digi.	Album
"Portal"	2014	—	Little Machines
"Same Sea" (K.Flay Remix)	2015	—	Little Machines
"Meteorites"	2016	—	Midnight Machines
"Skydiving"	2017	—	Skin & Earth
"Savage"	2017	31	Skin & Earth
"Fight Club"	2017	—	Skin & Earth
"New Fears"	2017	—	Skin & Earth
"Giants" (Acoustic)	2017	—	Skin & Earth
"Happy Xmas (War Is Over)"	2019	—	Non-album single
"Beside Myself"	2021	—	Pep
"Last Christmas"	2024	—	Non-album single
"—" denotes a recording that failed to chart.

== Other charted songs ==
List of other songs, with selected chart positions
Title	Year	Peak positions	Album
Title	Year	CAN Digi.	Album
"The Listening"	2009	72	The Listening

== Other appearances ==
List of non-single appearances, with other performing artists, showing year released and album name
Title	Year	Other artist(s)	Album
"Perfect" (Note: "Perfect" is credited to Valerie Poxleitner.)	2006	None	Songs from Instant Star 4
"Meant for Each Other"	2007	The Februarys	All the Time in the World
"Home is Where the Heartache Is"	2007	The Februarys	All the Time in the World
"I Was Always Thinking of You"	2007	The Februarys	All the Time in the World
"You Got the Girl"	2009	The Tremulance	Polaroids
"The End"	2009	Silverstein	A Shipwreck in the Sand
"Crucify Me"	2010	Bring Me the Horizon	There Is a Hell Believe Me I've Seen It. There Is a Heaven Let's Keep It a Secret.
"Don't Go"	2010	Bring Me the Horizon	There Is a Hell Believe Me I've Seen It. There Is a Heaven Let's Keep It a Secret.
"Used to Be Sweet"	2010	The Secret Handshake	Night & Day
"The Yacht Club"	2011	Owl City	All Things Bright and Beautiful
"Just to Feel Alive"	2012	Anthony Green	Beautiful Things
"Living in Another World"	2012	None	Spirit of Talk Talk
"Book Club" (Acoustic)	2012	Arkells	Non-album single
"Desire"	2013	Maestro Fresh-Wes	Orchestrated Noise
"Open Water"	2013	blessthefall	Hollow Bodies
"Remember to Remember"	2013	Shad	Flying Colours
"Just Here with My Friends" (remix)	2018	The Darcys, Leah Fay	Non-album single
"Last One to Know"	2020	Steve Aoki, Mike Shinoda	Neon Future IV
"That's It, That's All"	2022	Dear Rouge	Spirit

== Music videos ==
List of music videos, showing year released and director
Title	Year	Director(s)	Ref.
"Drive My Soul"	2008	Sean Michael Turrell	
"February Air"	2008	Sean Michael Turrell	
"Saviour"	2009	Roboshobo	
"Every Day" (Ten Second Epic featuring Lights)	2009	Sean Michael Turrell	
"Ice" (version one)	2009	Unknown	
"Ice" (version two)	2009	Roboshobo	
"Wavin' Flag" (as part of Young Artists for Haiti)	2010	Unknown	
"Second Go"	2010	Sean Michael Turrell	
"Deer In the Headlights" (Note: Guest appearance by Lights)	2011	Unknown	
"Toes"	2011	Sean Michael Turrell	
"Banner"	2012	Sean Michael Turrell	
"Timing Is Everything"	2012	Ken Galloway	
"True Colors" (as part of Artist Against Bullying)	2012	Unknown	
"Cactus in the Valley" (acoustic) (featuring Owl City)	2013	Lights	
"Portal"	2014	Iota Creative	
"Up We Go"	2014	Alon Isocianu	
"Running with the Boys"	2015	Amit Dabrai	
"Same Sea"	2015	Amit Dabrai	
"Meteorites"	2016	Unknown	
"Giants"	2017	Jeremy Schaulin-Rioux	
"Skydiving"	2017	Jeremy Schaulin-Rioux	
"Savage"	2017	Jeremy Schaulin-Rioux	
"New Fears"	2017	Jeremy Schaulin-Rioux	
"We Were Here"	2018	Jeremy Schaulin-Rioux	
"Lost Girls"	2019	Beau Bokan	
"Dead End" (with MYTH)	2020	Beau Bokan	
"Batshit" (with MYTH)	2020	Beau Bokan	
"Prodigal Daughter"	2021	Matt Barnes	
"Real Thing" (featuring Elohim)	2021	Lindsey Blane	
"Salt and Vinegar"	2022	Lindsey Blane	
"In My Head" (featuring Josh Dun)	2022	Lindsey Blane	
"Damage"	2024	Lights	
"Alive Again"	2025	Lights	
"Surface Tension"	2025	Lights	
"White Paper Palm Trees"	2025	Lights	
