= In the Land Of =

Studio album by Wintersleep
- Released: March 29, 2019
- Recorded: Bathouse Recording Studio, Kingston; Revolution Recording, Toronto; St. Bernard Studios, Montreal
- Genre: Indie rock
- Length: 43:04
- Label: Dine Alone Records
- Producer: Tony Doogan

Wintersleep chronology
The Great Detachment (2016)	In the Land Of (2019)

Professional ratings
Review scores
Source	Rating
The Spill Magazine	(6/10)

In the Land Of is the seventh album by Canadian indie rock band Wintersleep, released on March 19, 2019, through Dine Alone Records.

The band began working on the album a year after releasing their previous effort The Great Detachment. They teamed up with producer Tony Doogan who also produced Welcome to the Night Sky and New Inheritors during months of 2018 and tracked the album at studios in Montreal, Kingston and Toronto.

The band released first single "Surrender" in late 2018, and the rest of the album's singles, "Beneficiary", "Forest Fire" and "Into the Shape of Your Heart", followed in early 2019.

Following the album's release date, Dine Alone Records announced a limited issue of "splatter" coloured vinyl LPs for sale via their website.

== Track listing ==
No.	Title	Length
1.	"Surrender"	4:18
2.	"Forest Fire"	4:18
3.	"Beneficiary"	3:53
4.	"Into the Shape of Your Heart"	4:30
5.	"The Lighthouse"	4:12
6.	"Never Let You Go"	2:57
7.	"Soft Focus"	4:31
8.	"Waves"	4:41
9.	"Terror"	4:16
10.	"Free Pour"	5:28

== Credits ==
- Aaron Goldstein – Pedal Steel
- Jace Lasek – Therevox & Additional tracking at Breakglass Studios, Montreal
- Rich Carey – Artwork
- Jud Haynes - Graphic Design & Layout
- Greg Calbi – Mastering
- Jon Samuel – Group Member, Keyboard
- Loel Campbell – Group Member, Drums, Percussion
- Chris Bell – Group Member, Bass Guitar
- Paul Murphy – Group Member, Lead Vocals, Guitar
- Tim D'Eon – Group Member, Guitar (occasionally keyboard)
- Tony Doogan – engineer, producer
- John Agnello – mixing (Tracks 1, 4, 5 and 7–10)
- Michael H. Brauer – mixing (Tracks 2, 3 & 6)
- Calvin Hartwick – mixing Engineer
- Fernando Reyes – Assistant Mixing Engineer
- Nyles Spencer – assistant engineer
- Luke Schindler – assistant engineer
- Gemma Mazza – assistant engineer
