= The Great Detachment =

Studio album by Wintersleep
- Released: March 4, 2016
- Recorded: Sonic Temple, Halifax, Nova Scotia
- Genre: Indie rock
- Label: Dine Alone Records
- Producer: Tony Doogan

Wintersleep chronology
Hello Hum (2012)	The Great Detachment (2016)	In the Land Of (2019)

The Great Detachment is the sixth album by Canadian indie rock band Wintersleep, released in 2016 on Dine Alone Records.

The album received its widest publicity for "Amerika", a single whose video painted a seemingly apocalyptic portrait of contemporary American life before cutting away to a clip from a campaign speech by Donald Trump, several months before the 2016 presidential election. The song was their biggest hit since "Weighty Ghost" in 2007, reaching #1 on Canada's alternative and rock charts.

The album was a shortlisted Juno Award finalist for Adult Alternative Album of the Year at the Juno Awards of 2017.

Geddy Lee, of Canadian power-trio Rush fame, plays bass on track 10, "Territory".

== Track listing ==
1. "Amerika"
2. "Santa Fe"
3. "Lifting Cure"
4. "More Than"
5. "Shadowless"
6. "Metropolis"
7. "Spirit"
8. "Freak Out"
9. "Love Lies"
10. "Territory"
11. "Who Are You"
