= Junior Blue =

- Origin: Toronto, Ontario, Canada
- Genres: Post-rock
- Years active: 2001–2003
- Labels: Outside Music, Dependent
- Members: Dylan Hudecki, Justin Peroff, Graham Walsh, Kevin Drew, Dave Newfeld, Kristen Hudecki, Jose Contreras, Brian Borcherdt, Lisa McIssac, Brendan Canning, Chris Mills, Colleen Hixenbaugh, Brian Cram, Shinsuke Matsuda, Stella Luna, Martin Stieb, Caroline Ross, John Hall, Steve Munday, Audrey Bankley

Junior Blue is a Canadian post-rock group, consisting of Justin Peroff and Dylan Hudecki, along with contributions by Peroff's Broken Social Scene bandmates Kevin Drew and Brendan Canning, and Hudecki's By Divine Right bandmates José Miguel Contreras and Brian Borcherdt.

The band released an album, Junior Blue In the Search of Solid Gold in 2003.

== Discography ==
- In the Search of Solid Gold

=== Track listing ===
1. "Cabs (Day One)" - 5:21
2. "Jam1" - 2:32
3. "Complete Breakdown" - 2:35
4. "Telephone Wires" - 2:00
5. "She" - 4:16
6. "Sleeping Through Alarm Clocks" - 3:10
7. "7:35am" - 1:14
8. "Gold" - 7:56
9. "(Untitled)" - 1:41
10. "(Untitled)" - 4:06
11. "(Untitled)" - 2:10
