= Wintersleep (album) =

Studio album by Wintersleep
- Released: April 29, 2003
- Genre: Indie rock
- Length: 44:19
- Label: Dependent Music
- Producer: Wintersleep

Wintersleep chronology
Wintersleep (2003)	untitled (2005)

Professional ratings
Review scores
Source	Rating
Kludge	9/10

Wintersleep is the debut album by Canadian indie rock band Wintersleep, released in 2003 on Dependent Music.

== Track listing ==
All songs written by Wintersleep with additional vocals by Stacy Ricker on the track "Wind".

No.	Title	Length
1.	"Sore"	3:28
2.	"Snowstorm"	2:50
3.	"Avalanche"	4:05
4.	"Butterfly"	4:10
5.	"Home"	2:29
6.	"Caliber"	5:16
7.	"The Dead"	1:18
8.	"Wind"	2:38
9.	"Orca"	3:36
10.	"Assembly Lines"	3:08
11.	"Ambulance"	3:34
12.	"Motion"	7:47

== Credits ==
- Paul Murphy – vocals and acoustic guitars
- Loel Campbell – drums
- Tim D'Eon – guitars
- Jud Haynes – bass guitar
- James R. Shaw – recording engineer + original mix and mastering (2003)
- Laurence Currie – re-mixing
- Noah Mintz – re-mastering
- Stacy Ricker – backing vocals
