= Everybody Breaks a Glass =

Single by Lights featuring Holy Fuck and Shad

from the album Siberia
- Released: July 19, 2011
- Recorded: 2011
- Studio: Metalworks (Mississauga, ON)
- Genre: Electropop
- Length: 3:57
- Label: Last Gang; Sire
- Songwriter(s): Lights Poxleitner, Brian Borcherdt, Graham Walsh, Shadrach Kabango

Lights singles chronology
| "My Boots" (2010) | "Everybody Breaks a Glass" (2011) | "Toes" (2011) |

"Everybody Breaks a Glass" is a song by Canadian recording artist Lights. It was released on July 19, 2011 as a promotional single from her second studio album Siberia (2011). It features music by electronica band Holy Fuck and guest vocals from Canadian rapper Shad.

== Background ==
The song features music from the Electronica band, Holy Fuck and vocals from Shad. Upon its release, Lights stated her nervousness over the new song.

Man, this feels like my first release all over again. Nervous, sweaty palms, the whole deal!

So stoked to see you guys enjoying the new tune and on board with me staying at the cusp of my craft. I'm having so much fun, and I promise there's tons more to come!

The new tune "Everybody Breaks a Glass" is officially on iTunes now!

- Lights

== Music video ==
On July 22, a lyric video was released by Lights. The video was envisioned and created solely by Lights.

== Track listing ==
iTunes single (July 19, 2011)
| No. | Title | Writer(s) | Length |
|---|---|---|---|
| 1. | "Everybody Breaks a Glass" | Lights | 3:57 |

== Charts ==
The song has debuted at #15 on the iTunes Canadian Songs chart. For the issue date of August 6, 2011, the song debuted in the 79th position of the Canadian Hot 100.

| Chart (2011) | Peak position |
|---|---|
| Canadian Hot 100 | 79 |
