= Mutant Message =

Studio album by By Divine Right
- Released: December 8, 2009
- Genre: Indie rock
- Label: Hand Drawn Dracula
- Producer: José Miguel Contreras

By Divine Right chronology
Sweet Confusion (2004)	Mutant Message (2009)

Mutant Message is an album by the Canadian indie rock band By Divine Right, released on December 8, 2009, on Hand Drawn Dracula. It was the band's first album since Sweet Confusion in 2004.

The album was produced by José Miguel Contreras. The band's line up on the album consists of Contreras, Stew Heyduk and Darcy Rego, with guest vocals from Jason Nunes and Lily Frost.

The album was a longlisted nominee for the 2010 Polaris Music Prize.

== Track listing ==
1. "I Love a Girl"
2. "Que Paso"
3. "Wings too Big"
4. "Cupid in Oilskins"
5. "Figure Me Out"
6. "Kiss My Chakras"
7. "Pisco Sour"
8. "2002-2003"
9. "Help Me Find a Place to Land"
10. "I Will Hook You Up"
