= Cousins (band) =

Canadian garage rock band

- Origin: Halifax, Nova Scotia, Canada
- Genre: Garage rock
- Labels: Saved by Vinyl, Hand Drawn Dracula
- Members: Aaron Mangle; Leigh Dotey

Cousins is a Canadian garage rock band from Halifax, Nova Scotia. They have released three albums and toured in Canada and the United States.

== History ==
First formed in 2006, the band has had a variety of lineups. Its constant members have been singer/songwriter and guitarist Aaron Mangle, and drummer Leigh Dotey, who are not cousins. They released their debut album, Out on Town, independently in 2009, and toured around Canada in support of the album in 2010, including at Pop Montreal. They signed to Saved by Vinyl for their 2012 album The Palm at the End of the Mind. In 2012, the band toured extensively across Canada and the United States, sometimes with Mangle and Dotey playing as a duo, and often as a group of three or four musicians.

Their third full-length album, The Halls of Wickwire, was released May 13, 2014, on Hand Drawn Dracula. The album was produced by Graham Walsh of Holy Fuck, and was a longlisted nominee for the 2014 Polaris Music Prize.

== Albums ==
- Out on Town (2009)
- The Palm at the End of the Mind (2012)
- The Halls of Wickwire (2014)
