= Contrived =

Canadian rock band

- Origin: Halifax, Nova Scotia, Canada
- Genres: Rock, alternative
- Years active: 2000–2010, 2019–present
- Labels: Dependent; Hand Drawn Dracula
- Members: Loel Campbell; Mike MacNeill; Tim D'Eon; Jon Samuel; Ryan MacDonald
- Past members: Mike Bigelow
- Website: Contrived on Instagram

Contrived is a Canadian indie rock band. Based in Nova Scotia, the band consists of Loel Campbell, Mike MacNeill, Tim D'Eon and Jon Samuel. Four of the five members are also in the band Wintersleep, and two were in Holy Fuck.

The band released two full-length albums and one EP on Dependent Music before signing to Hand Drawn Dracula, which released their third album in 2008.

== History ==
Contrived was formed in June 2000 by McNeil, Campbell and Bigelow while they were high school students in Stellarton. Although Wintersleep achieved national fame first, Contrived in fact existed earlier and Wintersleep was originally a side project in collaboration with Paul Murphy of the band Kary. Campbell has stated in interviews that the band's name was a sarcastic riposte to the popularity of mainstream boy band pop at the time.

They began performing in the Halifax area, and in 2002 released an album, Pursuit of Plots, on the Dependent Music label.

Contrived appeared in video for a television pilot in 2003, and became known locally for their highly energetic live shows; they released an EP in 2004.

Their next album, Dead Air Verbatim, was recorded partly in London, Ontario, and produced by Andy Magoffin. It included a second guitarist, Jon Samuel, and was named as one of 2004's most anticipated releases by !earshot. The album was supported by their first major national tour, on a bill that included both Contrived and Wintersleep as well as singer-songwriter Jill Barber.

In 2008, the group released their third album, Blank, Blank, Blank. The album pursued a less heavy rock sound than the band's previous work, and was produced by David Newfeld of Broken Social Scene.

By 2010, Wintersleep had been established as major national rock stars by the success of their breakthrough single "Weighty Ghost", and Contrived were performing only occasionally.

Contrived reunited in Stellarton in January 2018 to perform at a party celebrating the life of Campbell's late father. Over the following two years, Murphy and D'Eon moved back to Halifax, and Campbell also spent more time in the city, allowing for more collaborations as both Wintersleep and Contrived.

Contrived began work on their fourth album in December 2021. The album, Addicted to Sadness, was released in September 2024, with the singles "Gemini" and "Half of It" preceding it.

== Members ==
- Mike Bigelow – bass
- Loel Campbell – drums
- Mike MacNeil – vocals, guitar
- Tim D'Eon – keyboards, guitars
- Jon Samuel – vocals, guitar

== Discography ==
- Pursuit of Plots (2002)
- Starshine (2004, EP)
- Dead Air Verbatim (2005)
- Blank, Blank, Blank (2008)
- Addicted to Sadness (2024)

== See also ==
- Music of Canada
- Canadian rock
- List of bands from Canada
- List of Canadian musicians
- Category:Canadian musical groups
