= Untitled (Wintersleep album) =

untitled

Studio album by Wintersleep
- Released: February 15, 2005
- Recorded: 2004
- Genre: Indie rock
- Length: 42:29
- Label: Dependent Music
- Producer: Laurence Currie

Wintersleep chronology
Wintersleep (2003)	untitled (2005)	Welcome to the Night Sky (2007)

Professional ratings
Review scores
Source	Rating
Exclaim!	(favorable)
The PRP	4/5 stars

The second album by Canadian indie rock band Wintersleep is untitled. It was released February 15, 2005 on Dependent Music.

The CD contains a hidden track called "Spring". The song can be heard by 'rewinding' the first track of the CD, as it is found in the pregap of the first track.

Instead of a booklet or poster of lyrics etc. The CD and vinyl record include a children's storybook illustrated by Jud Haynes. It is about a boy named Tom Kotter who lost his heart.

In 2006, Jud Haynes and James Mejia, who did the artwork for the album, were nominated for a Juno in the category of "CD/DVD Artwork Design of the Year".

== Track listing ==
All songs were written by Wintersleep.

No.	Title	Length
1.	"Lipstick"	2:35
2.	"Jaws of Life"	3:05
3.	"Insomnia"	4:16
4.	"Nerves Normal, Breath Normal"	7:23
5.	"Faithful Guide"	3:34
6.	"Danse Macabre"	5:19
7.	"Fog"	1:37
8.	"Listen (Listen, Listen)"	3:13
9.	"Migration"	3:54
10.	"A Long Flight"	4:50
11.	"People Talk"	2:45

Hidden Tracks:

- "Spring"
- "Damage"

== Personnel ==
- Stephanie Bell – enhanced CD audio creation
- Loel Campbell – performer, group member
- Laurence Currie – producer, engineer, mixing
- Tim D'Eon – performer, group member
- Jud Haynes – booklet, group member
- Roger Lian – mastering
- James Mejia – collage
- Paul Murphy – performer, group member
- Darren Van Niekerk – assistant
- Wintersleep – producer
