= Good Morning Beautiful =

Good Morning Beautiful may refer to:

- "Good Morning Beautiful" (song), a song by Steve Holy
- Good Morning Beautiful (By Divine Right album)
- Good Morning Beautiful (Irving album)
