= Ice (Lights song) =

2007 song by Lights

- Re-release cover

Single by Lights

from the EP Lights and the album The Listening
- Released: October 12, 2009
- Recorded: 2007
- Genre: New wave, synthpop
- Length: 2:57
- Label: Underground, UMC, Sire
- Songwriters: Lights Poxleitner; Thomas "Tawgs" Salter

Lights singles chronology
"Saviour" (2009)	"Ice" (2009)	"Second Go" (2010)

Alternative cover
- Original release cover

"Ice" is a song by Canadian singer-songwriter Lights from her debut self-titled EP and debut album The Listening. It was originally released in April as a single for her EP. A remastered version of the song was featured on her debut album, and later released as a single on October 12, 2009.

== Background ==
"Ice" is driven by a new wave synth line and includes a keyboard solo.

== Music videos ==
=== First version ===
The beginning portion of the video was done by Lights herself. She worked on all the props herself at her house for a week. The monsters are played by Maurie Kaufmann and Adam Weaver, her two live musicians.

The video for "Ice" consists mostly of two scenes. The first features a 2D cutout figured of Lights and two monsters. It shows Lights walking along a street texting her boyfriend sad faces and sorry notes. The monsters, one purple and one yellow, jump out of several cardboard boxes and begin chasing Lights who flees to her house. Her house is actually a mini-replica of the room shown in "February Air" and "Drive My Soul". The cutouts are all operated by Lights herself.

Lights is then seen with new confidence and she comes out to face the monsters, resulting in her fighting and knocking them down. This part of the video gradually transitions to show only scenes of Lights in person with two life sized monsters, imitating the cutouts. She defeats both of the monsters and exits the scene texting again.

=== Second version ===
"Ice" has a revamped version of the music video. The video is a sequel to the Saviour video. Instead of the monster, she fights an evil version of herself.

The music video starts off with Lights playing a keytar in her apartment. During this, a darker reflection of herself appears in her window - played by Erin English. The reflection uses magic to move a stool, causing Lights to trip and fall into her bed. The evil Lights, more commonly known as Darks by her fans, then enters her counterpart's apartment, and Lights hoists herself out of the garbage can to face her. Darks begins to trash the apartment, destroying the keytar. Lights fights back in a similar manner. This is followed by bursts of magic in orange and blue. Darks destroys her vase and her keytar, but then proceeds to lift her fish bowl containing a goldfish up. Darks has really crossed the line and Lights shoots orange magic, causing the bowl to float. Darks, with the blue bursts, abruptly vanishes, leaving Lights momentarily confused. Then she reappears, and the ensuing battle sees an exchange of punches, pushes, and kicks. When Lights releases a burst of orange magic, Darks is sealed back into her own apartment. The video ends with Lights surveying her apartment, in which it is unclear whether it is Darks or Lights.

At first the music video for "Ice" was only available to Canadians, it was said later it would be released to the rest of the public the next day, but was released on Lights's Myspace later that night. That same day, "Ice" was available for purchase on the Canadian iTunes.

A poster featuring the cover of Lights' debut album, The Listening with lips on the painting of Lights can be seen in her apartment.

== Track listing ==
The Ice Pack EP (November 23, 2009)
No.	Title	Writer(s)	Length
1.	"Ice (Album Version)"	Lights, Thomas Salter	2:56
2.	"Ice (K-OS Remix)"		3:26
3.	"Ice (DJ Deadman & Tex Remix)"		2:49
4.	"Ice (Colin Munroe's Unsung Remix)"		3:04
5.	"Ice (Renholdër Mix)"		3:16
6.	"Ice (Modernaire Remix)"		3:25
7.	"Ice (Spike Club Mix)"		7:50

Ice EP (March 12, 2010) (Denmark iTunes)
No.	Title	Length
1.	"Ice"	2:55
2.	"Ice (Fabio Lendrum Remix)"	4:39
3.	"Ice (Modernaire Remix)"	3:24
4.	"Ice (Colin Munroe's Unsung Remix)"	3:04
5.	"Pretend (Reprise)"	3:05

Ice (Shaken Not Stirred Mix) (August 31, 2010)
No.	Title	Length
1.	"Ice (Shaken Not Stirred Mix)"	2:55

== Charts ==
Chart (2010)	Peak position
Canada Hot 100 (Billboard)	65
Canada CHR/Top 40 (Billboard)	29
Canada Hot AC (Billboard)	39
