= New Inheritors =

Studio album by Wintersleep
- Released: May 17, 2010
- Recorded: September 2009 – February 2010
- Genre: Indie rock
- Length: 53:25
- Label: The Tom Kotter Company
- Producer: Tony Doogan

Wintersleep chronology
Welcome to the Night Sky (2007)	New Inheritors (2010)	Hello Hum (2012)

Professional ratings
Review scores
Source	Rating
Sputnikmusic	4/5 stars
Rock Sound	7/10
God is in the TV	6/10
PopMatters	8/10

New Inheritors is the fourth album by Canadian indie rock band Wintersleep, released on May 17, 2010, in Europe, and in North America on May 18.

The band began working on the album in September 2009. The mixing process finished in January 2010, and the masters were done by February.

Several songs that are featured on the album were played live throughout 2009 and 2010; these songs include "Encyclopedia", "Baltic", "Black Camera", "Experience the Jewel", and "Blood Collection".

The song "Black Camera" was made available for streaming, while the title track, "New Inheritors", was released as a free download in March 2010. On May 3, 2010, all the tracks for New Inheritors began being streamed on the Wintersleep website.

Title is taken from a short story by Nathaniel Hawthorne called "The New Adam & Eve".

== Track listing ==
No.	Title	Length
1.	"Experience the Jewel"	4:37
2.	"Encyclopedia"	2:48
3.	"Blood Collection"	5:01
4.	"New Inheritors"	4:29
5.	"Black Camera"	3:27
6.	"Trace Decay"	4:59
7.	"Mausoleum"	6:21
8.	"Echolocation"	4:01
9.	"Terrible Man"	3:37
10.	"Preservation"	4:38
11.	"Mirror Matter"	4:09
12.	"Baltic"	5:18

== Credits ==
- Anne–Marie Proulx – Handclapping
- Caraline Risi – Strings
- Graeme Patterson – Artwork
- Greg Calbi – Mastering
- Jace Lasek – Assistant
- Jon Samuel – Group Member, Keyboard
- Liam Lynch – Strings
- Loel Campbell – Group Member, Drums, Percussion
- Michael Bigelow – Group Member, Bass Guitar
- Mick Cooke – Brass, String Arrangements
- Paul Murphy – Group Member, Lead Vocals, Guitar
- Rachel Denkers – Handclapping
- Robin Rankin – Keyboards
- Rosie Townhill – Strings
- Sébastien Rivard – Assistant
- Tim D'Eon – Group Member, Guitar (occasionally keyboard)
- Tony Doogan – Engineer, Mixing, Producer
- Ysla Robertson – Strings
