= Welcome to the Night Sky =

Studio album by Wintersleep
- Released: October 2, 2007
- Recorded: April–May 2007
- Genre: Indie rock
- Length: 41:43 (special edition 49:49)
- Label: Labwork
- Producer: Tony Doogan

Wintersleep chronology
untitled (2005)	Welcome to the Night Sky (2007)	New Inheritors (2010)

Professional ratings
Review scores
Source	Rating
BBC Music	(unfavorable)
Drowned in Sound	(8/10)
Pitchfork Media	(7.0/10)
Rock Sound	(8/10)

Welcome to the Night Sky is the third album by Canadian indie rock band Wintersleep. It was released October 2, 2007, by Labwork Music. In 2008, just after the album's release, Wintersleep won the Juno Award for New Group of the Year.

The album was produced by Tony Doogan, famous for his work with Mogwai and Belle and Sebastian, among others.

== Track listing ==
All songs were written by Wintersleep.

No.	Title	Length
1.	"Drunk on Aluminium"	4:02
2.	"Archaeologists"	3:37
3.	"Dead Letter & the Infinite Yes"	4:08
4.	"Weighty Ghost"	3:39
5.	"Murderer"	4:23
6.	"Search Party"	4:12
7.	"Astronaut"	2:18
8.	"Oblivion"	2:58
9.	"Laser Beams"	4:17
10.	"Miasmal Smoke & the Yellow Bellied Freaks"	8:09

Special edition bonus tracks

11. "The Kids are Ultra-Violent" – 3:33
12. "Early in the Morning" – 4:30

Wintersleep.com MP3 download bonus tracks

11. "The Kids are Ultra-Violent" – 3:33
12. "Oblivion (Acoustic Live at SXSW 2008)" - 2:57
13. "Weighty Ghost (Acoustic Live at SXSW 2008)" - 3:04
14. "Nerves Normal, Breath Normal (Live at Summersonic)" - 14:00

== Credits ==
- Paul Murphy - Guitar, Lead Vocals
- Greg Calbi - Mastering
- Loel Campbell - Drums, Percussion, Backing Vocals
- Tim D'Eon - Guitar, Keyboards, Backing Vocals
- Tony Doogan - Engineer, Mixing, Producer
- Jud Haynes - Bass guitar
- Jon Samuel - Guitar, Backing Vocals
- Darren Van Niekerk - Assistant
- Janesta Boudreau - Backing Vocals
- Graham Walsh - Backing Vocals

== Reception ==
"Weighty Ghost" and "Oblivion" both received extensive airplay on Canadian modern rock radio. The song "Weighty Ghost" was the opening theme of the Canadian TV show Cracked and was also featured in the show Being Human. Wintersleep also performed "Weighty Ghost" on The Late Show with David Letterman.
