= Second Go =

2010 single by Canadian singer Lights

Single by Lights

from the album The Listening
- Released: February 16, 2010
- Recorded: 2007–2008
- Genre: Synthpop
- Length: 3:17
- Label: Sire
- Songwriter: Poxleitner

Lights singles chronology
"Ice" (2009)	"Second Go" (2010)	"My Boots" (2010)

iTunes EP Cover

"Second Go" is the third single from Canadian singer-songwriter Lights debut album The Listening. It was released on February 16, 2010 in the United States.

== Music video ==
The video follows Lights going through a plain white house, painting it throughout the video with various colours. This is the first video since the release of her EP that she has not gone with a space theme. The video was shot in only one take. The video premiered on MuchMusic on May 13, 2010.

== Track listing ==
Second Go EP (August 27, 2010) [UK only]
No.	Title	Length
1.	"Second Go (Album Version)"	3:16
2.	"Second Go (Echoes Remix)"	5:40
3.	"Second Go (Music Video)"	3:18

== Charts ==
Chart (2010)	Peak position
Canada Hot 100 (Billboard)	54
Canada CHR/Top 40 (Billboard)	28
Canada Hot AC (Billboard)	12
