= By Divine Right =

Canadian indie rock band

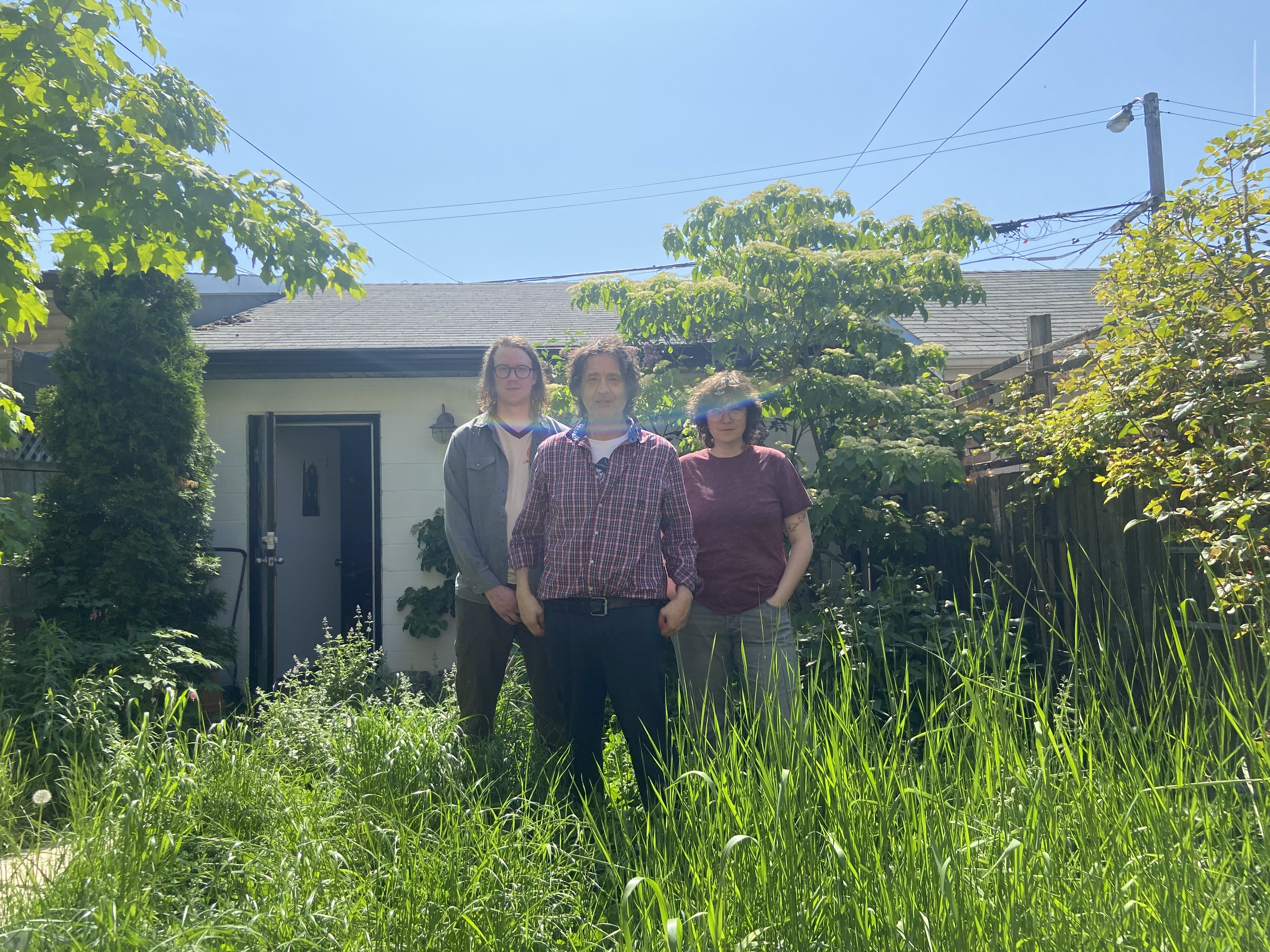
- By Divine Right in May 2023

Background information
- Also known as: BDR
- Origin: Toronto, Ontario, Canada
- Genres: Indie rock
- Years active: 1989–present
- Labels: Nettwerk, spinART, Squirtgun, Linus, Kinetic, Hand Drawn Dracula, Headless Owl, Fortune Stellar
- Members: José Miguel Contreras; Alysha Haugen; Colin White
- Past members: Mark Goldstein; Brendan Canning; Leslie Feist; Brian Borcherdt; John Hall; Dylan Hudecki; Darcy Rego; Cam Giroux; Loel Campbell; Derek Downham; Colleen Hixenbaugh; Michael Small; Jason Nunes; Stew Heyduk; Julien Beillard; Scott Maynard; Rob Carson; Rob Higgins; Cam Bull; Mitch Perkins; Elizabeth Teear; Rob Covens; Steve Berman; Michael Milosh; Dave Joseph; Geordie Dynes
- Website: bydivineright.ca

By Divine Right is a Canadian indie rock band led by guitarist and vocalist José Miguel Contreras.

== History ==
The band was formed in 1989 by high school friends Contreras, drummer Mark Goldstein, bass guitarist Liz Teear and guitarist Steve Berman while members were attending Thornlea Secondary School in Thornhill, Ontario. The band issued a number of independent releases before signing to Squirtgun Records for their 1997 album All Hail Discordia.

Bassist Brendan Canning and guitarist Leslie Feist joined the band in 1998 in the run up to their 1999 release Bless This Mess, which was supported by a Canadian and American national tour opening for The Tragically Hip. Canning and Feist later left the band, and co-founded Broken Social Scene.

In 2001, the band released the album Good Morning Beautiful. In 2003, By Divine Right was one of the only Canadian bands to do a concert tour of China.

From 2001 to 2004, the band's line up consisted of Contreras, Colleen Hixenbaugh, Brian Borcherdt, John Hall and Dylan Hudecki. In 2004, drummer John Hall was replaced by Cam Giroux (who played on Good Morning Beautiful), while Borcherdt and Hudecki both left the band. Hudecki was replaced by Darcy Rego and then Michael Small, both of The Meligrove Band, for tours of the United States, Canada and Britain, supporting Sweet Confusion. Filling in on drums for some dates was Loel Campbell of Wintersleep.

After these tours, the band's line-up changed again, to Contreras, Hixenbaugh and Small with drummer Derek Downham, followed by a September 2006 show at the Drake Hotel (Toronto) that saw the band perform all new songs with Rego, Small and Jason Nunes (The Meligrove Band) under the By Divine Right name.

By Divine Right's next live show was on December 31, 2007, at the Tranzac Club in Toronto, at which the band's new full-time line up of Contreras, Stew Heyduk (of The Golden Dogs) and Mitch Perkins (formerly of Rusty) appeared together for the first time.

In 2007, By Divine Right contributed a cover of Rheostatics' "Shaved Head" to the tribute album The Secret Sessions, with a line-up consisting only of Contreras and Julien Beillard of the band Wooden Stars.

In May 2008, By Divine Right opened a show for The Golden Dogs at the Horseshoe Tavern in Toronto with yet another new line up, consisting of Contreras, Heyduk and Darcy Rego returning on drums.

In 2009, Mutant Message, the band's first album since 2004's Sweet Confusion, was released in Canada on the Toronto Arts imprint Hand Drawn Dracula. label The album has José Contreras, Stew Heyduk and Darcy Rego with guest vocals by Jason Nunes and Lily Frost, and features "Que Paso", the first song Contreras wrote and sung in Spanish despite his longtime fluency in the language. By Divine Right's first tours since 2005 followed, with a new drummer, David Joseph, and bass guitarist, Michael Milosh. Music videos were released for the songs "I Love a Girl", "Cupid in Oilskins" and "I Will Hook You Up". The band's line up changed again after these tours, with Dylan Hudecki and Darcy Rego each filling in before Geordie Dynes and Alysha Haugen joined in late 2010.

In 2013, By Divine Right released its ninth album, Organized Accidents. In 2016 they released Speak & Spell, a track-for-track cover of Depeche Mode's 1981 album Speak & Spell.

Contreras has also released two solo albums, José Contreras (2014) and At the Slaughterhouse (2019).

In 2022, By Divine Right released the single "St. Leons" as a preview of the album OTTO MOTTO, which was released on September 23, 2022, through Fortune Stellar Records out of Toronto.

== Band members ==
=== Current members ===
- José Miguel Contreras – lead vocals, guitar, keyboards, cello, percussion (1989–present)
- Alysha Haugen – bass, backing vocals (2010–present)
- Colin White – drums (2023–present)

=== Former members ===
- Mark Goldstein – drums (1989–2000)
- Steve Berman – guitar (1989–1991)
- Elizabeth Teear – bass (1989–1993)
- Rob Carson (1992–1994)
- Scott Maynard – bass (1993–1996)
- Cam Bull – bass (1996–1997)
- Brendan Canning – bass (1998–2000)
- Leslie Feist – guitar, backing vocals (1998–2000)
- Brian Borcherdt – guitar, keyboards, backing vocals (2001–2004)
- Colleen Hixenbaugh – guitar, keyboards, backing vocals (2001–2006)
- Dylan Hudecki – bass, guitar, keyboards, percussion, backing vocals (2001–2004, 2005, 2010)
- John Hall – drums (2001–2004)
- Cam Giroux – drums, backing vocals (2001, 2004–2005)
- Darcy Rego – drums (2004, 2006, 2008, 2010)
- Loel Campbell – drums (2004)
- Michael Small – bass (2004–2006)
- Derek Downham – drums (2005–2006)
- Jason Nunes – guitar, keyboards, backing vocals (2006)
- Julien Beillard – guitar, backing vocals (2007)
- Mitch Perkins – drums (2007–2008)
- Stew Heyduk – bass (2007–2008)
- Michael Milosh – bass (2009–2010)
- Dave Joseph – drums (2009–2010)
- Geordie Dynes – drums (2010–2023)

== Discography ==
- Buffet of the Living Dead – 1992 (independent cassette)
- By Divine Right (album)|By Divine Right – 1995 (Kinetic)
- All Hail Discordia – 1997 (Squirtgun)
- Bless This Mess – 1999 (Nettwerk)
- Good Morning Beautiful – 2001 (Linus)
- Hybrid TV Genii – 2004 (Linus/spinART)
- Sweet Confusion – 2004 (Linus/spinART)
- Mutant Message – 2009 (Hand Drawn Dracula)
- Organized Accidents - 2013 (Hand Drawn Dracula)
- Speak & Spell US - 2016 (Headless Owl Records)
- OTTO MOTTO - 2022 (Fortune Stellar)

== See also ==
- Canadian rock
- List of bands from Canada
- List of Canadian musicians
