= Acoustic (Lights EP) =

EP by Lights
- Released: July 20, 2010
- Recorded: 2010
- Genre: Acoustic; pop
- Length: 17:22
- Label: Sire
- Producer: Lights

Lights chronology
The Listening (2009)	Acoustic (2010)	Siberia (2011)

Acoustic (also referred to as Lights.Acoustic) is the second extended play (EP) by Canadian musician Lights. It was released in Canada on July 20, 2010.

== Reception ==
The AllMusic review by Andrew Leahey awarded the album 3 stars stating "When Lights released her debut album, The Listening, in 2009, she almost seemed like the female equivalent of Owl City: a young adult performing cute, sparkling electro-pop with the assistance of a few synthesizers and a swarm of MySpace fans. She also co-produced the album, whose lush, layered sound sometimes put more emphasis on the production than the music itself. This acoustic EP takes the opposite approach by dialing back the instruments and focusing on Lights’ voice, presenting each song as if it were written for a coffee shop rather than an arena. Stripped of their production, the five tracks show that Lights is a fairly talented songwriter, and the three selections that also appeared on The Listening still fare well in a stripped-down, back-to-basics format. Bonus: Lights tosses a cover of Rancid’s “Fall Back Down” into the mix, proving that she’s not as innocent as her dreamy pop songs might suggest."

Professional ratings
Review scores
Source	Rating
AllMusic	3/5 stars

== Track listing ==
No.	Title	Writer(s)	Length
1.	"River"	Lights Poxleitner; Thomas Salter	3:14
2.	"February Air"	Poxleitner; Dave Thomson	3:51
3.	"Fall Back Down" (Rancid cover)	Tim Armstrong; Lars Frederiksen	3:00
4.	"Saviour"	Poxleitner; Salter	3:19
5.	"Romance Is..."	Poxleitner	3:58
Total length:			17:22

== Personnel ==
- João Carvalho – mastering
- Lights– vocals, guitar, engineer, mixing, producer,

== Charts ==
Chart (2010)	Peak position
Canadian Albums (Billboard)	7
US Billboard 200	122
US Heatseekers Albums (Billboard)	2
