= Latin (Holy Fuck album) =

Studio album by Holy Fuck
- Released: May 11, 2010
- Recorded: 2009
- Genre: Electronic
- Length: 38:17
- Label: Young Turks
- Producer: Holy Fuck

Holy Fuck chronology
LP (2007)	Latin (2010)	Congrats (2016)

Professional ratings
Aggregate scores
Source	Rating
Metacritic	75/100
Review scores
Source	Rating
AllMusic	4/5 stars
The A.V. Club	(B)
Drowned in Sound	8/10 stars
musicOMH	4/5 stars
Pitchfork	(7.8/10)
PopMatters	5/10 stars
Sputnikmusic	3/5 stars
Tiny Mix Tapes	4/5 marks

Latin is the third album from improvisational electronic band Holy Fuck. It was placed on the Long List for the 2010 Polaris Music Prize. In the United States, the album reached #14 on the Billboard Dance charts and #40 on the Heatseekers chart.

== Track listing ==
1. "1MD" - 4:09
2. "Red Lights" - 3:49
3. "Latin America" - 4:49
4. "Stay Lit" - 3:20
5. "Silva & Grimes" - 5:14
6. "SHT MTN" - 2:52
7. "Stilettos" - 3:56
8. "Lucky" - 4:11
9. "P.I.G.S." - 6:03

iTunes bonus tracks

1. "Jungles - 3:40
2. "Grease Fire" - 4:43

== Personnel ==
- Brian Borcherdt - Keyboards, effects, composer
- Graham Walsh - Keyboards effects, composer, recording engineer
- Matt "Punchy" McQuaid - Bass, composer
- Matt Schulz - Drums, composer
- Shaun Brodie - Trumpet ("Stay Lit")
- Eli Janney - Mixing ("1MD" (w/ Holy Fuck), "Latin America," "Lucky")
- Dave Newfeld - Mixing ("Red Lights," "Stay Lit," "SHT MTN," "P.I.G.S.")
- D. Sardy - Mixing ("Stilettos")
- Ryan Jenning - Mixing engineer ("Stilettos")
- Paul Epworth - Mixing ("Silva & Grimes")
- Mandy Parnell - Mastering
- Bjorn Copeland - Artwork
- Mikael Gregorsky - Photography
- James Mejia - Art, layout, design (w/ Holy Fuck)
