= Hello Hum =

Studio album by Wintersleep
- Released: June 12, 2012
- Recorded: Summer 2011; Tarbox Road Studios, New York City
- Genre: Indie rock
- Length: 45:34
- Label: Roll Call Records
- Producer: Tony Doogan; Dave Fridmann

Wintersleep chronology
New Inheritors (2010)	Hello Hum (2012)	The Great Detachment (2016)

Professional ratings
Review scores
Source	Rating
Sputnikmusic	(4/5)

Hello Hum is the fifth album by Canadian indie rock band Wintersleep, released on June 12, 2012.

The band started writing the album during the New Inheritors tour in 2010 and 2011, via "late night voice memo'd bedroom demos, hallucinogenic dreams of Paul Schaeffer".

The group recorded the new songs in the late summer of 2011 with Scottish producer Tony Doogan, who had already produced their last effort New Inheritors, and Dave Fridmann, who had previously worked with such bands as The Flaming Lips, Mercury Rev, and MGMT.

== Track listing ==
All tracks are written by Wintersleep

No.	Title	Length
1.	"Hum"	2:33
2.	"In Came the Flood"	3:33
3.	"Nothing Is Anything (Without You)"	3:10
4.	"Resuscitate"	4:42
5.	"Permanent Sigh"	5:16
6.	"Saving Song"	4:05
7.	"Rapture"	3:37
8.	"Unzipper"	4:08
9.	"Someone, Somewhere"	4:12
10.	"Zones"	4:11
11.	"Smoke"	6:03

European iTunes Store deluxe edition bonus track (DE, BE, LU, CH, AT, NL only)
No.	Title	Length
12.	"Papa Time"	4:04

Amazon.de/Spotify deluxe edition & Canadian iTunes Store bonus track
No.	Title	Length
13.	"In Came the Flood" (Stripped/Acoustic Version)	3:22

Deluxe Edition bonus tracks^{[a]}
No.	Title	Length
12.	"In Came the Flood" (Acoustic Version)	3:22
13.	"Nothing Is Anything (Without You)" (Acoustic Version)	3:04
14.	"Someone, Somewhere" (Acoustic Version)	5:08

Notes

- ^{^a} Some iTunes stores lists it as Bonus Track Version, due to having (selected ones) Deluxe Edition of album with the bonus track titled Papa Time.

== Credits ==
- Michael Bigelow – Composer
- Greg Calbi – Mastering
- Loel Campbell – Composer, Group Member
- Marianne Collins – Illustrations
- Tim D'Eon – Composer, Group Member
- Tony Doogan – Engineer, Producer
- Dave Fridmann – Additional Music, Bass, Mixing, Producer
- Jud Haynes – Design, Layout
- Jon Samuel – Composer
- Paul Murphy - Composer, Group Member
- Wintersleep – Primary Artist
