= Hand Drawn Dracula =

- Founder: James Mejia; J. Araujo
- Distributors: Outside Music, Redeye Worldwide
- Genre: Indie, post punk, dream pop
- Country of origin: Canada
- Location: Toronto, Ontario
- Official website: handdrawndracula.com

Hand Drawn Dracula (HDD) is a Toronto-based independent record label. Artists who have released music on the label include Beliefs, Breeze, Brian Borcherdt, Bruce Peninsula, By Divine Right, Chastity, Dusted, Julie Fader, No Joy, Postdata, Tallies, Vallens and Wintersleep.

HDD Projects includes music by Black Moth Super Rainbow, Holy Fuck, Sebastien Grainger and Shugo Tokumaru.

== Artists ==
- Beliefs
- Bishop Morocco
- Black Moth Super Rainbow (Vicious Circles Project)
- Brian Borcherdt
- Breeze
- Bruce Peninsula
- By Divine Right
- Chastity
- Ora Cogan
- Kyle Edward Connolly
- Contrived
- Cousins
- Deliluh
- Deserts (formerly Bad Tits) feat. Josh Reichmann & Sebastien Grainger
- Doomsquad
- Dopes (a.k.a. Josh Reichmann)
- Dusted (feat. Brian Borcherdt)
- Etiquette
- Julie Fader
- Fresh Snow
- Greys
- His Clancyness
- Holy Fuck
- Little Girls
- Mausoleum
- Praises
- Michael Peter Olsen
- Nailbiter
- No Joy
- Off the International Radar
- Postdata
- Praises
- Prince Josh
- Josh Reichmann
- Rolemodel
- Sahara
- The Seams
- Tallies
- Tasseomancy
- Shugo Tokumaru (Vicious Circles Project)
- Vallens
- Wintersleep
- Wish
- Yi
