= Wintersleep =

Canadian rock band

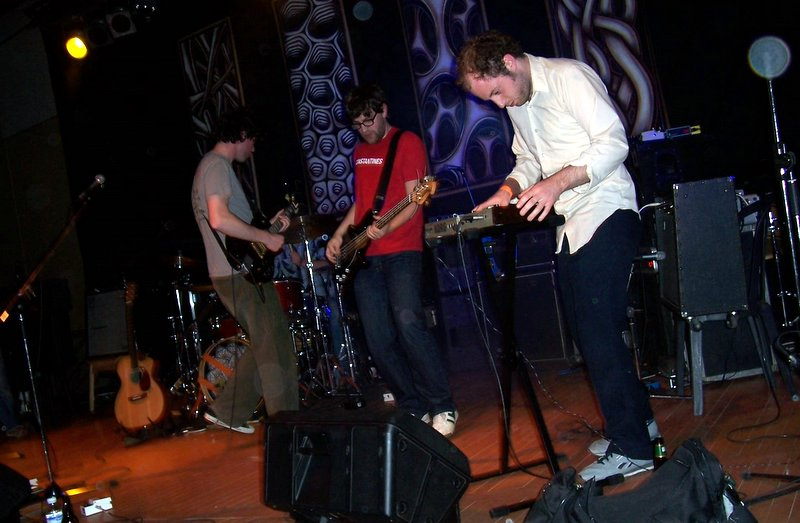
- Wintersleep performing in 2004

Background information
- Origin: Halifax, Nova Scotia, Canada
- Genres: Alternative rock, indie rock
- Years active: 2001–present
- Labels: Labwork; Dependent; Hand Drawn Dracula; Dine Alone
- Members: Paul Murphy; Loel Campbell; Tim d'Eon; Jon Samuel; Mike Bigelow
- Past members: Jud Haynes; Chris Bell
- Website: wintersleep.com

Wintersleep is a Canadian indie rock band formed in Halifax, Nova Scotia in 2001. The band's original lineup consisted of vocalist and guitarist Paul Murphy, guitarist and keyboardist Tim d'Eon, and drummer Loel Campbell. Between 2002 and 2007, Jud Haynes played bass guitar for the band. In 2005, Mike Bigelow joined on keyboards until 2006, after which he played bass, until 2016. Since 2006, Jon Samuel has served as a backing vocalist, keyboardist, and guitarist, while Chris Bell has served as a backing vocalist and bass guitarist since 2016. Bigelow returned to the band in 2021. In 2005, Wintersleep opened for Pearl Jam for two shows in St. John's, Newfoundland, at the Mile One Stadium. The band received a Juno Award in 2008. To date, Wintersleep have released seven studio albums.

== History ==
=== First three albums: 2001–2007 ===
Wintersleep formed in 2001. Originally from the small town of Yarmouth, Nova Scotia, members Paul Murphy and Tim d'Eon had known each other through their previous progressive rock band, Kary, which they formed in the mid-1990s, while still in high school, with drummer Mark d'Eon and bassist Jesse Luke. Kary released two official albums, The Sound of Beauty Breathing in 2001 and Light in 2004, before disbanding. Murphy was friends with drummer Loel Campbell, a native of Stellarton, with whom he recorded a number of songs. Tim d'Eon and bassist Jud Haynes soon joined them, and they named themselves Wintersleep. They released two albums through Dependent Music, a label and artist collective formed in Yarmouth, Nova Scotia in 1994.

In 2006, Wintersleep signed with Labwork Music, a partnership label of Sonic Unyon and EMI Music Canada, and re-released their first two studio albums. The re-releases included bonus tracks and videos not featured in the originals.

On October 2, 2007, Wintersleep released their third full-length album, Welcome to the Night Sky. A limited edition of the record, on vinyl, with alternative artwork, was published by Hand Drawn Dracula. They won the 2008 Juno Award for New Group of the Year.

=== New albums, increased exposure: 2009–2014 ===
Wintersleep was selected as one of the opening acts by Paul McCartney for his concert at Halifax Common on July 11, 2009. That year, the band toured in support of Welcome to the Night Sky and also began writing their next record, New Inheritors, which came out on May 17 in Europe and May 18 in North America. Their fifth album, Hello Hum, was published in 2012.

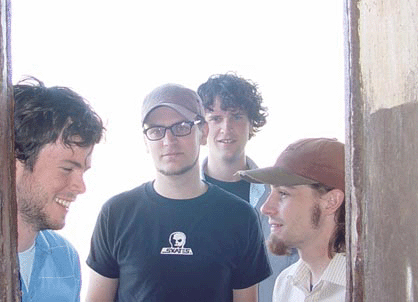
Original lineup of Wintersleep, in 2003

The group's song "Weighty Ghost" was used in the 2008 film One Week, in both the trailer and one of the final scenes. In 2010, the song was included in The Top 100 Canadian Singles by National Post's Bob Mersereau. Wintersleep performed "Weighty Ghost" on the Late Show with David Letterman on January 14, 2011. In 2011, the song appeared on the TV series Being Human and was also used in the background of a Molson Canadian commercial, advertising the "Red Leaf Project". In 2013, "Weighty Ghost" became the theme music of the Canadian Broadcasting Corporation television crime drama Cracked.

Wintersleep toured extensively during 2013, including as the opening act for Scottish indie band Frightened Rabbit, who invited them on their UK tour and later their North American tour. Wintersleep also opened for Frightened Rabbit on the latter's North American dates in early 2018.

In 2014, the band recorded eleven tracks at The Sonic Temple studio in Halifax. That year, they also performed on a moving streetcar at the North by Northeast festival in Toronto.

=== New label and further releases: 2015–present ===
In December 2015, Wintersleep signed with Dine Alone Records. In January 2016, they premiered the song "Amerika" through The Wall Street Journal's blog. On March 4 of that year, the band released their sixth studio album, The Great Detachment, through Dine Alone. Rush bassist and vocalist, Geddy Lee, played on the track "Territory".

On Valentine's Day 2018, Wintersleep announced that their first three albums would be reissued on vinyl, with a bonus 7" single including previously unreleased tracks.

In December 2018, the band announced their next album, In the Land Of. It was released on March 29, 2019, by Dine Alone. The album release was supported by a national tour, from March 20 to May 3, 2019, with some but not all dates featuring Partner as the opening act. Wintersleep was joined by Montreal band Caveboy as the opening act at four Ontario tour dates. In the Land Of went on to be long-listed for the Polaris Music Prize.

In September 2019, Wintersleep embarked on a tour of Europe, following the worldwide digital release of "Free Fall" and "Fading Out", on September 9, 2019. The two singles were originally released on Record Store Day and became the top-selling release of the national event.

== Other projects ==
Drummer Loel Campbell is or has been a member of several other projects, including Contrived, Holy Fuck, and Billy Talent. Paul Murphy has collaborated with various other musicians, including his brother, on his solo project Postdata. Mike Bigelow plays bass in Contrived and also Holy Fuck. Tim d'Eon played guitar for Contrived, appearing on their first two albums.

== Band members ==
Current

- Loel Campbell – drums, guitar (2001–present)
- Paul Murphy – vocals, guitar (2001–present)
- Tim d'Eon – guitar, keyboards (2001–present)
- Jon Samuel – keyboards, backing vocals, guitar (2006–present)
- Mike Bigelow – bass guitar (2007–2016, 2021–present), keyboards (2005–2006)

Former

- Jud Haynes – bass guitar (2002–2007)
- Chris Bell – bass guitar, backing vocals (2016–2020)

== Discography ==
=== Studio albums ===
Year	Album	Peak chart positions
Year	Album	CAN
2003	Wintersleep	—
2005	Untitled	—
2007	Welcome to the Night Sky	66
2010	New Inheritors	12
2012	Hello Hum	20
2016	The Great Detachment	19
2019	In the Land Of	—
2026	Wishing Moon	—
"—" denotes releases that did not chart.

=== Singles ===
Year	Song	Peak chart positions				Album
Year	Song	CAN	CAN Air	CAN Alt	CAN Rock	Album
2007	"Weighty Ghost"	54	—	×	9	Welcome to the Night Sky
2008	"Oblivion"	—	—	×	17	Welcome to the Night Sky
2010	"Black Camera"	—	—	14	×	New Inheritors
2010	"New Inheritors"	—	—	—	×	New Inheritors
2010	"Trace Decay"	—	—	31	×	New Inheritors
2010	"Preservation"	—	—	33	×	New Inheritors
2012	"In Came the Flood"	—	—	7	×	Hello Hum
2012	"Nothing Is Anything (Without You)"	—	—	31	×	Hello Hum
2016	"Amerika"	—	50	1	1	The Great Detachment
2016	"Spirit"	—	—	—	5	The Great Detachment
2017	"Freak Out"	—	—	—	45	The Great Detachment
2019	"Free Fall / Fading Out"	—	—	—	—	non-album single
2019	"Beneficiary"	—	—	—	44	In the Land Of
2025	"I Got a Feeling"	—	—	40	×	Wishing Moon
"—" denotes releases that did not chart. "×" denotes periods where charts did not exist or were not archived.

== Videography ==
Year	Song	Director
2003	"Caliber"	Brian Borcherdt
2004	"Sore"	Sean Wainsteim
2005	"Danse Macabre"	Sean Wainsteim
2006	"Jaws of Life"	Sean Wainsteim with James Mejia
2006	"Fog"	Mirco Chin
2006	"Lipstick"	4030 CREW
2006	"Faithful Guide"	Sean Wainsteim
2006	"Insomnia"	Jesse Luke
2007	"Weighty Ghost"	Sean Wainsteim
2008	"Oblivion"	Darren Pasemko
2010	"Black Camera"	
2010	"Trace Decay"	
2010	"Preservation"	Sean Wainsteim
2011	"New Inheritors"	Danny (Think Tank Creative)
2012	"In Came the Flood"	Sean Wainsteim
2012	"Nothing Is Anything (Without You)"	Christopher Mills
2016	"Amerika"	Scott Cudmore

== Awards ==
- 2008: Juno Award for New Group of the Year
- 2008: Much Music Video Award – VideoFACT Award for "Weighty Ghost"
