= Postdata (band) =

Musical project by Paul Murphy

Postdata is the solo project of Paul Murphy of the band Wintersleep. While centered around Murphy's songwriting and vocals, it features an ever-changing cast of supporting musicians.

Supporting collaborators have included Murphy's brother Michael Murphy, Grant Hutchison and Andy Monaghan of Frightened Rabbit, Loel Campbell and Tim D'Eon of Wintersleep, and Simone Pace of Blonde Redhead.

== History ==
The project's self-titled debut album was released on Hand Drawn Dracula in 2010, and supported with a national tour across Canada. Later in the year, Murphy released three additional non-album tracks.

Postdata's second album, Let's Be Wilderness, was released in 2018 on Paper Bag Records. The album was nominated for a Nova Scotia Music Award, and appeared on the !earshot National Top 50 Chart in June. A video for the track "Evil" was filmed in New York City by director Derrick Belcham. That year the band performed at the Pop Montreal festival.

The band's third album, Twin Flames, was released in March 2021. It was recorded in mid-2020 with co-producer Ali Chant, partly in Bristol, England, and partly during lockdown in Halifax.

Run Wild, the band's fourth album, was released in September 2023.
