= Holy Fuck (album) =

Studio album by Holy Fuck
- Released: November 1, 2005
- Recorded: 9 November 2004 and 21 January 2005
- Genre: Electronica
- Length: 50:38
- Label: Dependent

Holy Fuck chronology
Holy Fuck (2005)	LP (2007)

Professional ratings
Review scores
Source	Rating
Hour	4.5/5 stars
Pitchfork	(6.9/10)
PopMatters	(7/10)
AllMusic	3.5/5 stars

Holy Fuck is the 2005 eponymous debut release from Canadian electronica band Holy Fuck. Tracks 1 & 5 were recorded 9 November 2004 by Laurence Currie at Idea of East, Halifax, Nova Scotia. The remainder of the album was recorded 21 January 2005 by Dave Newfeld at Stars & Suns, Toronto, Ontario. All the tracks were mixed by Laurence Currie.

== Track listing ==
1. "Tone Bank Jungle" – 6:34
2. "Korock" – 4:25
3. "Korg Rhythm Afro" – 6:48
4. "Casio Bossa Nova" – 6:26
5. "Tonebank Computer" – 7:08
6. "Bontempi Latin" – 4:53
7. "K.Rhythm Pt.1" – 5:14
8. "K.Rhythm Pt.2" – 9:10
