= LP (Holy Fuck album) =

Studio album by Holy Fuck
- Released: October 23, 2007
- Recorded: 2007
- Genres: Electronica, instrumental rock
- Length: 36:57
- Labels: Dependent; Young Turks (UK release)

Holy Fuck chronology
Holy Fuck (2005)	LP (2007)	Latin (2010)

Professional ratings
Review scores
Source	Rating
The A.V. Club	(B+)
AbsolutePunk.net	(92%)
AllMusic	3.5/5 stars
NME	(9/10)
The Observer	4/5 stars
Pitchfork	(7.9/10)
Soundsect	3.5/5 stars
Rocklouder	4/5 stars
Time Off	4/5 stars
Uncut	4/5 stars

LP is the second album from lo-fi improvisational electronica band Holy Fuck. The album was nominated for Alternative Album of the Year at the 2008 Juno Awards and was nominated for the 2008 Polaris Music Prize. Owen Pallett contributed to the album, playing the violin part on 'Lovely Allen'. A remix version of "Royal Gregory" is featured on the soundtrack to Midnight Club: Los Angeles.

Several of the tracks on LP first appeared on Holy Fuck EP, self-released in 2007. Only one track from EP, "They're Going to Take My Thumbs", did not make it to LP. It went on to be used in Breaking Bad & Kenny vs Spenny.

== Track listing ==
1. "Super Inuit" – 3:33 (recorded live in Dave King's barn)
2. "Milkshake" – 3:28
3. "Frenchy's" – 2:53
4. "Lovely Allen" – 4:29
5. "The Pulse" – 5:55*
6. "Royal Gregory" – 3:49
7. "Echo Sam" – 4:26
8. "Safari" – 4:23*
9. "Choppers" – 4:16*

*Recorded live by Craig James on The Verge, XM satellite radio
