= Good Morning Beautiful (By Divine Right album) =

Studio album by By Divine Right
- Released: 2001
- Genre: Indie rock
- Label: Linus Entertainment
- Producer: José Miguel Contreras, João Carvalho, Andy Magoffin

By Divine Right chronology
Bless This Mess (1999)	Good Morning Beautiful (2001)	Sweet Confusion (2004)

Professional ratings
Review scores
Source	Rating
AllMusic	4.5/5 stars
Now	3/5

Good Morning Beautiful is an album by the Canadian indie rock band By Divine Right, released in 2001 on Linus Entertainment.

The album was produced by José Miguel Contreras, João Carvalho, and Andy Magoffin.

== Critical reception ==
AllMusic called Good Morning Beautiful "a trendless, timeless classic rock and pop album." The Ottawa Citizen called it "a focused and sunny collection of upbeat pop songs, less pretty and with more of a rock edge than Bless This Mess."

== Track listing ==
All songs written by José Miguel Contreras, except "Back to You" by Contreras and Gordon Downie.

1. Dedication
2. Supernatural
3. Soul Explosion
4. Stella Heart Ocean
5. Powersuit
6. Sweet Lovin'
7. Angels
8. Hugger of Trees
9. Medicine
10. One More City
11. Kick This Bummer
12. Back to You
