= Felix Cartal discography =

- Studio albums: 5
- EPs: 6
- Singles: 45
- Remixes: 48

This is the discography of the Canadian DJ Felix Cartal.

== Studio albums ==
=== Popular Music ===
Released February 23, 2010, by Dim Mak as a digital download and on CD.

No.	Title	Length
1.	"Popular Music Intro"	3:56
2.	"Berlin"	4:17
3.	"I Believe In" (featuring Beta Bow)	3:40
4.	"World Class Driver"	4:06
5.	"Volcano" (featuring Johnny Whitney)	4:03
6.	"Drone"	3:53
7.	"The Grinch"	4:12
8.	"Love"	5:14
9.	"Dutch George" (Horn version)	4:35
10.	"Why Wait" (featuring Todd Fink)	2:52
11.	"Boy and His Computer"	4:47
12.	"Something Nice"	4:07

=== Different Faces ===
Released March 27, 2012, by Dim Mak as a digital download and on CD.

No.	Title	Length
1.	"We are All Aliens"	1:43
2.	"H.U.N.T."	4:03
3.	"Triple Deke"	5:32
4.	"Higher"	3:52
5.	"City of Love"	3:43
6.	"Don't Turn on the Lights"	4:27
7.	"Domo"	4:40
8.	"The Race"	4:31
9.	"Black to White" (featuring Miss Palmer)	5:19
10.	"Life Is a Sinewave"	4:17
11.	"Tonight" (featuring Maja Ivarsson)	3:20
12.	"30,000 Lfo's"	5:00
13.	"Fin"	6:29

=== Next Season ===
Released May 4, 2018, by Physical Presents as a digital download.

No.	Title	Length
1.	"Stop Being Yourself" (featuring Gabrielle Current)	4:09
2.	"Drifting Away" (featuring Ofelia K)	3:44
3.	"Faces" (featuring Veronica)	3:15
4.	"Walking By" (featuring Iselin)	3:38
5.	"Hold Tight"	3:35
6.	"Down for You" (featuring Veronica)	3:37
7.	"The Wave" (featuring Moon Bounce)	3:19
8.	"Everything is Fine" (featuring Regn)	3:44
9.	"The Searchers"	1:41
10.	"Wherever" (featuring Coeur de pirate)	3:43
11.	"Everyone but Me" (featuring Daniela Andrade)	2:50
12.	"Runaway" (featuring Regn)	3:30
13.	"Falling Down"	3:46
14.	"Mood"	3:52
15.	"Get What You Give"	3:39
16.	"Overused"	1:57
17.	"Worry" (featuring Victoria Zaro)	3:57
18.	"Listen"	3:55

=== Expensive Sounds for Nice People ===
Released June 25, 2021, by Physical Presents as a digital download.

No.	Title	Length
1.	"The Life" (with Fjord)	3:37
2.	"Over It" (with Veronica)	3:28
3.	"Harmony"	2:54
4.	"Layover"	3:16
5.	"Mine" (with Sophie Simmons)	3:20
6.	"500 Days" (with Matilda)	3:18
7.	"Old Self" (with Ofelia K)	3:45
8.	"We Fall"	2:56
9.	"Only One" (with Karen Harding)	3:11
10.	"My Last Song" (with Hanne Mjøen)	2:35
11.	"Love Me" (with Lights)	3:14
12.	"Going Up"	3:10
13.	"Happy Hour" (with Kiiara)	2:48
14.	"Jealous" (with Melina Borglowe)	2:57
15.	"Hygge"	2:07
16.	"Too Late" (with Kroy)	3:59

=== I, Sabotage ===
Released October 17, 2025, by Physical Presents as a digital download.

No.	Title	Length
1.	"Nothing Like This" (featuring Charlie Houston)	3:36
2.	"Wanna Go" (with Aiko)	3:38
3.	"Sabotage"	3:01
4.	"Dancing in a Dream" (with Rêve)	2:38
5.	"Summer Rain" (with Reo Cragun)	2:57
6.	"Right on Time" (with Tegan and Sara)	3:15
7.	"Caught in a Loop (I've Changed)" (with Lizzy Land)	3:45
8.	"Mouth of Madness" (with Ofelia K)	4:05
9.	"Dissociate" (with Vox Rea)	4:30
10.	"No Air" (with Phea)	3:32
11.	"At Pace"	0:20
12.	"Dance and Cry" (with Gucci Caliente)	3:52
13.	"Can't Stop Thinking"	3:46
14.	"Set Me Free" (with Elohim)	4:01
15.	"Feel Less" (with Lights)	4:01

== Extended plays ==
- Skeleton released in 2008 by Dim Mak
- The Joker released in 2011 by Dim Mak
- Solar (with Keatch) released in 2011 by Dim Mak
- Animals (with Keatch) released in 2011 by Dim Mak
- Past, Present, Felix released in 2013 by Dim Mak
- Credits released in 2014 by Dim Mak
- I released in 2024 by Physical Presents

== Charted singles ==
Title	Year	Peak chart positions					Certifications	Album
Title	Year	CAN	CAN AC	CAN CHR/Top 40	CAN HAC	US Dance	Certifications	Album
"Don't Turn on the Lights" (featuring Polina)	2011	86	—	—	—	—		Different Faces
"Fakin It" (with Kaskade featuring Ofelia K)	2016	—	—	—	—	26		Non-album single
"Get What You Give"	2017	70	7	5	3	24	MC: Platinum	Next Season
"Mood"	2018	—	—	30	—	—		Next Season
"Love Me" (with Lights)	2019	38	16	6	5	47	MC: 2× Platinum	Expensive Sounds for Nice People
"Mine" (with Sophie Simmons)	2020	29	11	9	4	—	MC: Platinum	Expensive Sounds for Nice People
"Happy Hour" (with Kiiara)	2021	—	29	21	29	—		Expensive Sounds for Nice People
"Nothing Good Comes Easy" (with Elohim)	2022	—	—	34	—	44		Non-album singles
"Love You More" (with Daya)	2023	—	—	22	33	—		Non-album singles
"Feel Less" (with Lights)	2024	—	—	46	—	—		I, Sabotage
"Dancing in a Dream" (with Rêve)	2025	97	—	10	24	—		I, Sabotage
"The Way" (with Fionn)	2026	—	—	25	—	—		I (Still), Sabotage
"—" denotes a recording that did not chart or was not released.

== Non-charted singles ==
=== As lead artist ===
Title	Year	Album
"Decadanse"	2006	Non-album singles
"Moss vs Tree"	2006	Non-album singles
"Drugs"	2007	Non-album singles
"Parisienne"	2007	Non-album singles
"Montreal Dreams"	2007	Skeleton
"Vancouver"	2007	Non-album singles
"L'Amour"	2008	Non-album singles
"Volcano" (featuring Johnny Whitney)	2010	Popular Music
"World Class Driver"	2010	Popular Music
"Love"	2010	Popular Music
"Kung Lao's Theme"	2011	Non-album single
"The Joker"	2011	The Joker
"Solar" (with Keatch)	2011	Solar
"Black to White" (featuring Miss Palmer)	2012	Different Faces
"Domo"	2012	Different Faces
"H.U.N.T." (featuring Sebastien Grainger)	2012	Different Faces
"Cascade" (with Bart B More)	2012	Non-album singles
"Tonight" (featuring Maja Ivarsson)	2012	Non-album singles
"No Sleep" (featuring Natalie Angiuli)	2012	Non-album singles
"Lullaby" (featuring Natalie Angiuli)	2012	Non-album singles
"The Alarm" (with Autoerotique)	2013	Non-album singles
"The Fire" (with Clockwork featuring Madame Buttons)	2013	Non-album singles
"New Scene" (featuring Ofelia)	2013	Past Present Felix
"After Dark" (featuring Koko LaRoo)	2013	Past Present Felix
"Young Love" (featuring Koko LaRoo)	2013	Past Present Felix
"Slow Motion" (featuring Haerts)	2013	Non-album single
"Ready for Love" (featuring Chloe Angelides)	2014	Credits
"Heat" (with Autoerotique)	2014	Non-album singles
"With You" (featuring Natalie Angiulli)	2015	Non-album singles
"Something to Live For" (featuring Nikki Yanofsky)	2015	Non-album singles
"Keep Up" (featuring Steph Jones)	2016	Non-album singles
"Drifting Away" (featuring Ofelia K)	2016	Next Season
"Falling Down"	2016	Next Season
"Killing Time" (with R3hab)	2017	Non-album single
"Hold Tight"	2017	Next Season
"Runaway" (featuring Regn)	2018	Next Season
"Walking By" (featuring Iselin)	2018	Next Season
"Faces" (featuring Veronica)	2018	Next Season
"Worry" (featuring Victoria Zaro)	2018	Next Season
"Over It" (featuring Veronica)	2019	Expensive Sounds for Nice People
"Right Now"	2019	Non-album single
"Harmony"	2020	Expensive Sounds for Nice People
"Only One" (with Karen Harding)	2021	Expensive Sounds for Nice People
"My Last Song" (with Hanne Mjøen)	2021	Expensive Sounds for Nice People
"Too Late" (with Kroy)	2021	Expensive Sounds for Nice People
"The Life" (with Fjord)	2021	Expensive Sounds for Nice People
"You Don't Always Know"	2022	Non-album singles
"When I'm in Need"	2022	Non-album singles
"Down to Earth"	2022	Non-album singles
"Need Your Love" (with Karen Harding)	2023	Non-album singles
"Background Noise" (with Naliya)	2023	Non-album singles
"Dive /Stay/" (with Emma Løv)	2024	I
"Cuz of You" (with Cyn)	2024	I
"IDWTWYA"	2024	Non-album single
"Right on Time" (with Tegan and Sara)	2024	I, Sabotage
"Mouth of Madness" (with Ofelia K)	2025	I, Sabotage
"Wanna Go" (with Aiko)	2025	I, Sabotage
"Summer Rain" (with Reo Cragun)	2025	I, Sabotage
"Dissociate" (with Vox Rea)	2025	I, Sabotage

=== As featured artist ===
Title	Year	Album
"Rest Your Mind" (K.Flay featuring Felix Cartal)	2012	Non-album singles
"Lose My Love" (Sad Money featuring Gallant and Felix Cartal)	2020	Non-album singles

== Remixes ==
=== 2007 ===
- Hostage – "Gluttony"
- Dragonette – "Take It Like a Man"
- Moving Units – "Crash N Burn Victims"
- Britney Spears – "Outrageous"

=== 2008 ===
- Franz & Shape – "Psichedelica"
- Mr. Miyagi – "Pick Your Poison"
- Lazaro Casanova – "Vengaza"
- U-God – "Hips"
- Julien K – "Spiral"
- MSTRKRFT – "Bounce"
- From Monuments to Masses – "Beyond God and Elvis"
- Evil Nine – "They Live"

=== 2009 ===
- Acid Kids – "Mitch"
- Colin Munroe – "Piano Lessons"
- Laidback Luke – "Need Your Lovin'"
- The All-American Rejects – "Wind Blows"
- Nore featuring Kid Cudi – "Floatin in the Sky"
- Hussle Club – "I Have High Expectations for What I Want to Be But in the Mirror I Don't See Them Staring Back at Me"

=== 2010 ===
- Nrotb – "Droplet"
- Green Velvet – "Harmageddon"
- Underoath – "Paper Lung"

=== 2011 ===
- Chris Brown featuring Benny Benassi – "Beautiful People"
- Joachim Garraud – "We Are the Future"
- Wolfgang Gartner featuring will.i.am – "Forever"
- John Dahlback – "One Last Ride"
- Britney Spears – "I Wanna Go"

=== 2012 ===
- Etienne De Crecy – "Am I Wrong"
- Crystal Fighters – "Plage"
- Neon Hitch – "F**k U Betta"
- Autoerotique – "Roll the Drums"
- The Loops of Fury – "Don't Stop"
- Steve Aoki & Tiesto – "Tornado"
- All That Glitters – "This Sound"

=== 2013 ===
- The Killers – "Miss Atomic Bomb"
- Zedd – "Clarity"
- The Bloody Beetroots – "Spank"

=== 2014 ===
- Jack Ü – "Take Ü There"

=== 2016 ===
- Kiiara – "Feels"
- Rihanna – "Never Ending"
- Wafia - "Heartburn"
- Anna of the North - "Baby"
- Selena Gomez - "Kill Em With Kindness"
- Dillon Francis - "Anywhere"

=== 2017 ===
- Galantis – "Rich Boy"
- ALMA – "Chasing Highs"
- Tokimonsta featuring MNDR – "We Love"

=== 2019 ===
- MØ - "Blur"
- Ellie Goulding with Diplo featuring Swae Lee - "Close To Me"
- Astrid S – "Doing To Me"
- Felix Cartal featuring Veronica - "Over It" (Felix Cartal's Sunset Mix)

=== 2020 ===
- Felix Cartal and Sophie Simmons - "Mine" (Felix Cartal's Sunset Mix)

=== 2021 ===
- Felix Cartal and Kiiara - "Happy Hour" (Felix Cartal's Sunset Mix)
- Felix Cartal and Hanne Mjøen - "My Last Song" (Felix Cartal's After Hours Mix)
- Felix Cartal and Fjord - "The Life" (Felix Cartal's Sunset Mix)

=== 2022 ===
- Felix Cartal - "Stranger Things Theme" (Felix Cartal's After Hours Mix)
- Paul Oakenfold and Lizzy Land - "Get to You" (Felix Cartal Remix)

=== 2023 ===
- Dan Mangan - "Just Know It" (Felix Cartal's Sunset Mix)
- Felix Cartal and Daya - "Love You More" (Felix Cartal's Sunset Mix)

=== 2024 ===
- Lights - "Damage"
