= Brian Borcherdt =

Canadian musician (born 1976)

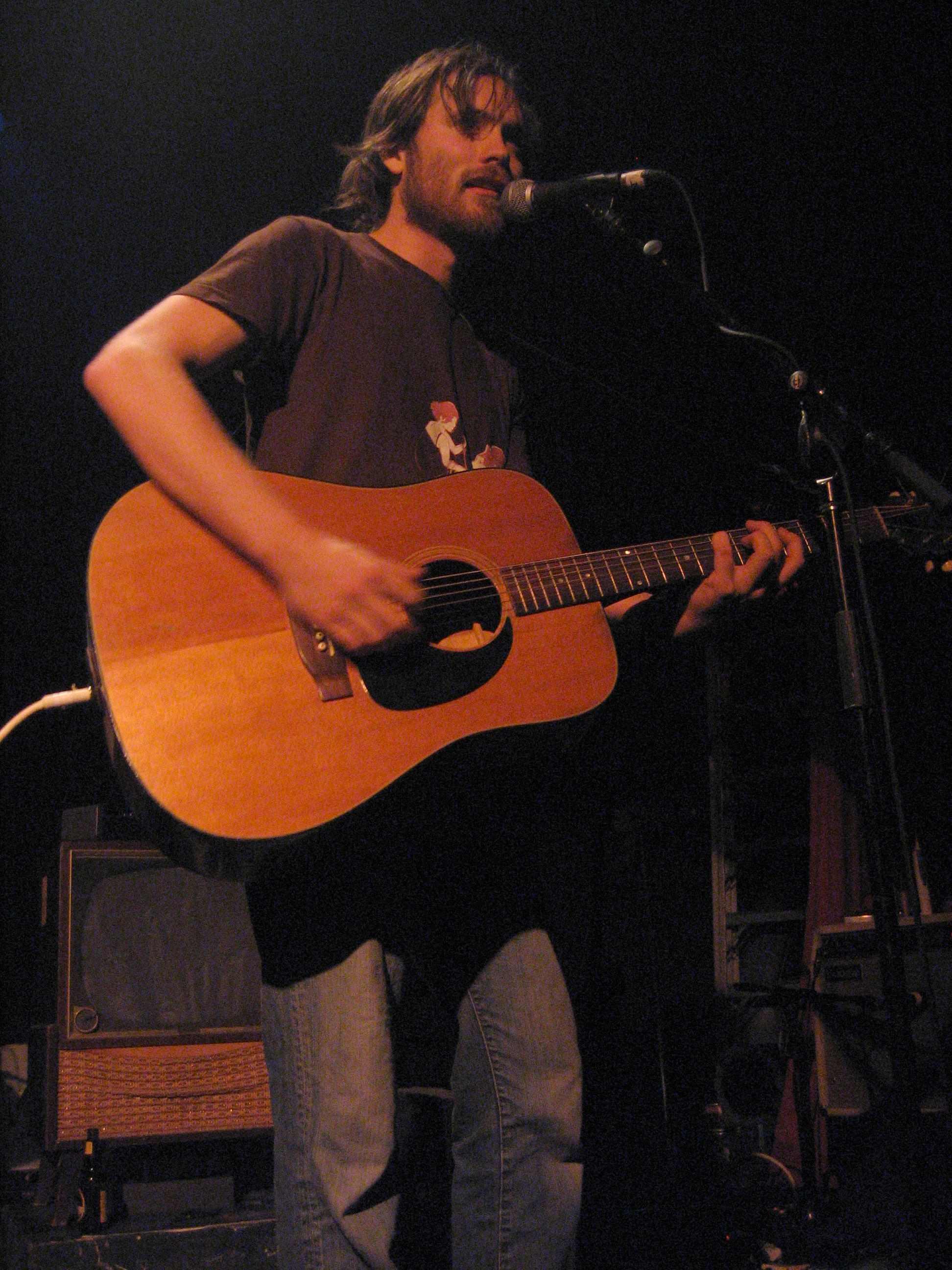
- Brian Borcherdt performing in Montreal, 2005

Background information
- Born: August 31, 1976 (age 49)
- Origin: Yarmouth, Nova Scotia, Canada
- Genres: Indie rock, post-punk
- Occupations: Singer-songwriter, musician, record producer
- Instruments: Vocals, guitar, keyboards
- Years active: 1994–present
- Labels: Dependent, Hand Drawn Dracula, Polyvinyl
- Website: handdrawndracula.com/artists/brian-borcherdt

Brian Borcherdt (born August 31, 1976) is a Canadian musician who has been both a solo artist and a member of Burnt Black, Trephines, Hot Carl, By Divine Right, Holy Fuck, Lids, and Dusted.

As a teenager growing up in Yarmouth, Nova Scotia, he founded independent music collective and record label Dependent Music.

== Chipmunks on 16 Speed ==
Chipmunks on 16 Speed or chipmunkson16speed (stylized in lower case) is a 2015 musical project by Brian Borcherdt, in which he plays various Alvin and the Chipmunks songs and covers on vinyl, and slows them down to 16 revolutions per minute, slow enough that the vocals no longer sound sped up. Most of the songs come from The Chipmunks album Chipmunk Punk, and the album covers for the project are also adapted from its cover art.

Borcherdt's work has been described as gothic rock, new wave, and post-punk, or a combination between sludge metal and pop, while Borcherdt himself described it as "heavy", "beautiful", and "poetic". A SoundCloud playlist made for the project, titled Sludgefest, was reuploaded to YouTube and gained over 3 million views, but has since been removed, with numerous re-uploads of the playlist still remaining online.

Borcherdt had discovered the concept as he began to play with Holy Fuck, after experimenting with the records on a turntable, and then found a suitcase turntable that could play at extremely slow speeds.

== Discography ==
=== Solo albums ===
==== The Remains of Brian Borcherdt ====
- Moth (2002)
- The Remains of Brian Borcherdt (2003)
- The Remains of..., Volume 2 (2004)
- Torches/ Ward Colorado Demos (unfinished recordings from 2005 to 2006)

==== Brian Borcherdt ====
- Coyotes (2008)

==== Chipmunks on 16 Speed ====
- Vol. 1 (2015)
- Vol. 2 (2015)

=== Collaborative albums ===
==== Burnt Black ====
- Happy (1994)
- Nervous Wreck (1996)
- A Demonstration (1997)
- Burned out (1999)
- Heretical (2026)

==== Trephines ====
- Trephines (2001)

==== By Divine Right ====
- Sweet Confusion (2004)

==== Holy Fuck ====
- Holy Fuck (2005)
- Holy Fuck EP (2007)
- LP (2007)
- Latin (2010)
- Congrats (2016)
- Deleter (2020)

==== Dusted ====
- Total Dust (2012)
- Blackout Summer (2018)
- III (2021)
