= My Boots =

Single by Lights
- Released: October 11, 2010
- Recorded: 2010
- Genre: Synthpop, new wave, electropop
- Length: 3:10
- Label: Warner Bros.
- Songwriters: Lights Poxleitner; Thomas "Tawgs" Salter

Lights singles chronology
"Second Go" (2010)	"My Boots" (2010)	"Everybody Breaks a Glass" (2011)

"My Boots" is a song by Canadian singer-songwriter Lights. It was released on October 11, 2010 digitally in Canada, and was released on October 19, 2010 in the US and the UK. It is a song about Lights' love of winter. "My Boots" was supposed to be included in Lights' second studio album Siberia, but was later cut out from the final track listing.

== Background ==
On October 12, 2010, Lights Tweeted, "It'll be on the new record, but I'm not done it yet lol. Needs... More... Time..." Lights said in an interview that the second full-length album was supposed to "come out in August, but I'm not supposed to tell you that."

Quoted from Jess Kotanen, Lights' sister on the Official Lights Message Boards:

"Lights was writing in northern Ontario last winter and looking out the window, she realized how much she missed winter (you don't really get it in Toronto). She had to drop everything and frolic outside with a dog and she got so excited about that experience that she walked back inside and wrote a song about it."

== Critical reception ==
"My Boots" has generally received positive reviews from critics. NeonLimelight.com stated that the song will make you want to "...strap on your dancing boots and hit the snow-covered streets to go out and dance on this one", complementing on the song's lyrics and the "...twinkling synth beat". The Daily Beat gave the song five stars, praising Lights for the synthy, "dance inflicted soon-to-be hit", calling the song her "...best offering yet".

== Track listing ==
Digital download
No.	Title	Length
1.	"My Boots"	3:09

Creature Remix Single
No.	Title	Length
1.	"My Boots (Creature Remix)"	3:43

Acoustic Version [Free download via Facebook]
No.	Title	Length
1.	"My Boots (Acoustic)"	3:19

Re:Boots Remix [Free download via iamlights.com]
No.	Title	Length
1.	"Re:Boots"	3:45

== Charts ==
Chart (2010)	Peak position
Canada Hot 100 (Billboard)	56
Canada Hot AC (Billboard)	30
