= How to Sleep When You're on Fire =

Studio album by Lights
- Released: June 11, 2020
- Recorded: 2020
- Genre: Synthwave
- Length: 38:35
- Label: self-released
- Producer: Lights

Lights chronology
AM 444 (2020)	How to Sleep When You're on Fire (2020)	Dead End (2020)

How to Sleep When You're on Fire is an EP by Canadian singer-songwriter Lights. It was released on June 11, 2020 on Bandcamp. All proceeds of this album will go to Black Lives Matter Vancouver. Lights stated: "I made a night-time instrumental synthwave album over the last few weeks of sleeplessness. Loads of chill vibes. Kind of like an island cave, but with an arcade in it".

== Reception ==
The Peak described the EP as "a vibey, instrumental space jam", while Blunt Magazine called it "synthwave for the soul".

== Track listing ==
All tracks are written by Lights.

No.	Title	Length
1.	"ChainLink"	5:11
2.	"ExoSkeleton"	5:20
3.	"SadBoy"	4:42
4.	"DarkMode"	6:26
5.	"GreenTxt"	5:02
6.	"Softeeth"	4:15
7.	"PalmTrees"	7:36
Total length:		38:35

== Personnel ==
All tracks are produced, mixed and mastered by Lights.
