= The Listening (Lights album) =

Studio album by Lights
- Released: September 22, 2009
- Recorded: 2006–09
- Studio: The Salt Room Studios; The Red Room Studios (St. Catharines, Ontario); Sony ATV Launch Pad Studios (Toronto, Ontario); Chalice Recording Studios (Hollywood, Los Angeles, California)
- Genre: Synthpop; electropop; indietronica; alternative rock
- Length: 43:18
- Label: Universal; Sire
- Producer: Lights; Thomas "Tawgs" Salter; Dave "Dwave" Thomson

Lights chronology
| Lights (2008) | The Listening (2009) | Acoustic (2010) |

Singles from The Listening
- 1. "Saviour" Released: July 13, 2009; 2. "Ice" Released: October 12, 2009; 3. "Second Go" Released: February 16, 2010

The Listening is the debut studio album by Canadian electronic recording artist Lights. It was released on September 22, 2009, by Sire Records, with global distribution handled by parent Warner Music Group, although in Lights' native Canada the album is released instead by Universal Music Canada under licence. By July 2017, the album was certified platinum by the Canadian Recording Industry Association (CRIA), denoting sales in excess of 80,000 copies.

== Critical reception ==
Professional ratings
Review scores
| Source | Rating |
|---|---|
| AllMusic | 3.5/5 stars |
| Blogcritics | positive |
| CHARTattack | 4/5 stars |
| NME | 1/5 |
| PopMatters | 8/10 |
| Toronto Star | 2.5/4 stars |

The Listening received generally positive reviews from music critics. Billboard contributor Mark Sutherland called the album a more accessible take on UK electronic music artists like Little Boots and La Roux. Ben Rayner of the Toronto Star said that people who can get past the saccharine preciousness, overuse of the vocoder and its "decidedly sleepy tone" will find an album that "actually proves itself a lot more inventive and unpredictable than its trappings initially betray." Camilla Pia from NME panned the record for Lights' "overproduced" vocals and "dreadful" songwriting with rote melodies and instrumentation, calling it a "painfully saccharine" cross between Owl City and Ashlee Simpson.

== Track listing ==
| No. | Title | Writer(s) | Producer(s) | Length |
|---|---|---|---|---|
| 1. | "Saviour" | Lights Poxleitner; Thomas "Tawgs" Salter | Lights; Salter | 3:29 |
| 2. | "Drive My Soul" | Poxleitner; Salter | Lights; Salter | 3:21 |
| 3. | "River" | Poxleitner; Salter | Lights; Salter | 3:04 |
| 4. | "The Listening" | Poxleitner; Dave "Dwave" Thomson | Lights; Thomson | 3:36 |
| 5. | "Ice" | Poxleitner; Salter | Lights; Salter | 2:56 |
| 6. | "Pretend" | Poxleitner | Lights; Salter | 3:23 |
| 7. | "The Last Thing on Your Mind" | Poxleitner | Lights; Thomson | 3:20 |
| 8. | "Second Go" | Poxleitner | Lights; Thomson | 3:16 |
| 9. | "February Air" | Poxleitner; Thomson | Lights; Thomson | 3:49 |
| 10. | "Face Up" | Poxleitner; Salter | Lights; Salter | 3:26 |
| 11. | "Lions!" | Poxleitner; Salter | Lights; Salter | 3:18 |
| 12. | "Quiet" | Poxleitner; Thomson | Lights; Thomson | 3:15 |
| 13. | "Pretend (Reprise)" | Poxleitner | Lights | 3:05 |
| Total length: | | | | 43:18 |

iTunes bonus tracks
| No. | Title | Writer(s) | Producer(s) | Length |
|---|---|---|---|---|
| 14. | "Saviour" (Colin Munroe's Unsung Mix) | Poxleitner; Salter | Lights; Salter; Munroe | 3:21 |
| 15. | "Saviour" (The Angry Kids FM Mix) | Poxleitner; Salter | Lights; Salter; The Angry Kids | 3:45 |
| 16. | "Up Up and Away" | Poxleitner | Lights; Thomson | 4:20 |
| Total length: | | | | 54:42 |

== Personnel ==
Adapted credits from the liner notes of The Listening.

- Lights – vocals, production (all tracks); mixing (track 13); layout, design
- The Angry Kids – additional production, remixing (track 15)
- Garnet Armstrong – layout, design
- João Carvalho – mastering
- Caitlin Cronenberg – photography
- Matt Green – engineering
- Colin Munroe – remixing (track 14)
- Thomas "Tawgs" Salter – production (tracks 1–3, 5, 6, 10, 11, 14, 15); mixing (tracks 2, 3, 6, 10, 11, 14, 15)
- Mark "Spike" Stent – mixing (tracks 1, 5)
- Dave "Dwave" Thomson – production, mixing (tracks 4, 7–9, 12, 16)
- Lee Towndrow – photography

== Charts ==
| Chart (2009–10) | Peak position |
|---|---|
| Canadian Albums (Billboard) | 7 |
| Greek Albums (IFPI) | 34 |
| US Billboard 200 | 129 |
| US Heatseekers Albums (Billboard) | 4 |

== Certifications ==
| Region | Certification | Certified units/sales |
|---|---|---|
| Canada (Music Canada) | Platinum | 80,000^{‡} |
^{‡} Sales+streaming figures based on certification alone.

== Release history ==
| Country | Date | Label |
|---|---|---|
| Canada | September 22, 2009 | Universal Music, Lights Music |
| United States | October 6, 2009 | Sire Records, Lights Music |
| United Kingdom | May 17, 2010 | Warner Bros. Records |
