= Saviour (Lights song) =

Single by Lights

from the album The Listening
- Released: July 6, 2009
- Recorded: 2007–08
- Genre: Synthpop; electropop; new wave
- Length: 3:29
- Label: Sire; Universal Music Canada
- Songwriters: Lights Poxleitner; Thomas "Tawgs" Salter
- Producers: Lights; Tawgs Salter

Lights singles chronology
"February Air" (2008)	"Saviour" (2009)	"Ice" (2009)

Alternative cover
- Saviour (Adam Young Remix) Cover

"Saviour" is the lead single from Canadian singer-songwriter Lights debut album The Listening (2009). It was released on July 6, 2009 in Canada, April 13, 2010 in the United States and May 9, 2010 in the United Kingdom. A week after the song's release in Canada, the song has entered the Canadian Hot 100, debuting at number 49.

== Background ==
The song is about Lights telling someone of her troubles and how she doesn't like who she's become. Furthermore, she tells them that one day, she will need them to save her. In an interview, Lights said that the start of the chorus ("I just wanna run to you") sounds like crying because she was actually crying while she wrote the song.

== Composition ==
The song is a poppy, keyboard-driven new wave ballad. Lights uses the Auto-Tune effect in this song.

== Music video ==
The video features Lights drawing comics in her bedroom, which gradually animate and send her comic self into outer space. Lights lands on a desolate planet and walks around, looking for something. She picks up a crystal with a flower growing inside it, and plants it into the earth, causing the dark sky to become filled with light and the plants to thrive once again - she becomes the "saviour" of the planet. Meanwhile, the real Lights plays her keytar, draws, and walks around her bedroom, discovering things that had appeared in the comic. The video concludes with her blowing on a pink flower that begins to glow with ethereal light. This is a prequel to the Drive My Soul video. Lights has a second version of this music video where added parts to the video are shown.

== Track listing ==
Radio Single (July 6, 2009)
No.	Title	Writer(s)	Length
1.	"Saviour"	Lights, Thomas Salter	3:29

Saviour EP (September 8, 2009)
No.	Title	Writer(s)	Length
1.	"Saviour"	Lights, Thomas Salter	3:29
2.	"The Listening"	Lights, Dave Thomson	3:36
3.	"Saviour (Colin Munroe's Unsung Mix)"		3:21
4.	"Saviour (The Angry Kids FM Mix)"		3:45

Adam Young Remix EP (May 4, 2010)
No.	Title	Writer(s)	Length
1.	"Saviour (Adam Young Remix)"	Lights, Thomas Salter	3:17
2.	"Saviour"		3:29
3.	"Saviour (Adam Young Remix) Music Video"		3:17

Jasta Remix (August 31, 2010)
No.	Title	Writer(s)	Length
1.	"Saviour (Jasta Remix)"	Lights & Thomas "Tawgs" Salter	3:27

== Charts ==
Chart (2009)	Peak position
Canada Hot 100 (Billboard)	38
Canada AC (Billboard)	48
Canada CHR/Top 40 (Billboard)	34
Canada Hot AC (Billboard)	15

== Certifications ==
Region	Certification	Certified units/sales
Canada (Music Canada)	Gold	40,000^{‡}
^{‡} Sales+streaming figures based on certification alone.

== Release history ==
Region	Date	Format
Canada	July 6, 2009	Digital download
United States	April 13, 2010	Digital download
United Kingdom	May 9, 2010	Digital download
