= February Air =

Single by Lights

from the EP Lights and the album The Listening
- Released: December 9, 2008
- Recorded: February 14, 2006
- Genre: Synthpop, new wave
- Length: 3:50
- Label: Underground Operations
- Songwriters: Lights Poxleitner, Thomas "Tawgs" Salter

Lights singles chronology
"Drive My Soul" (2008)	"February Air" (2008)	"Saviour" (2009)

"February Air" is the second single by Canadian singer-songwriter Lights from her debut self-titled EP. It was released on December 9, 2008, in Canada. The song reached #90 on the Canadian Hot 100 Billboard magazine chart. An acoustic version of the song was released on her EP, Acoustic.

== Music video ==
The video is the sequel to "Drive My Soul". The video opens with a shot of Lights sleeping on her futuristic bed, while the astronaut hangs his head in sorrow and leaves the house. Lights is all alone. She then wakes up, and sees that there is a message waiting for her. When she checks the message, she smiles for it is a shot of her and her beloved astronaut from the Drive My Soul video. Missing him again, she packs up her things, carrying a message in her bag that she had printed earlier. At first, she happily strolls along, but after a while she comes to a hill and collapses from the cold. She waits a bit, then stands up and throws a paper airplane that she had made earlier. It lands at the astronaut's feet, who picks it up. The message reads, Miss You <3

== Charts ==
Chart (2009)	Peak position
Canada Hot 100 (Billboard)	90
Canada AC (Billboard)	35
