= Lights (Lights EP) =

EP by Lights
- Released: July 24, 2008
- Recorded: 2006–08
- Genre: Synthpop, new wave, indie pop
- Length: 20:29
- Label: Underground, Doghouse
- Producer: Lights, Thomas Salter, Dave Thomson

Lights chronology
Lights (2008)	The Listening (2009)

Singles from Lights
- 1. "Drive My Soul" Released: March 11, 2008; 2. "February Air" Released: December 9, 2008; 3. "Ice" Released: April 2009

Lights is the self-titled debut EP by Canadian recording artist Lights, released on iTunes on July 24, 2008. It was released as a 12-inch vinyl on September 16, 2008.

== Background ==
=== Cover art ===
The cover art is a picture of Lights that she took in her apartment in Toronto heavily edited in a "cheap program" she owned for her computer at the time. She color-blocked and re-outlined the image rendering it to what it is. The cover led some to believe that the vinyl was a calendar, which prompted some mistakable purchases.

=== Songs in media ===
Beginning in February 2008, her song "February Air" was featured in a series of Old Navy television ads. The music video for the song premiered in December. Another track, "Drive My Soul", appeared during a 2008 episode of MTV's The Hills.

== Release and reception ==
The EP was released on July 24, 2008. It was made available in Canada through Best Buy, HMV, and iTunes, and in the United States on iTunes. Later in the year, coinciding with Lights' touring, the EP was made available on CD in the US on September 16, 2008.

Three songs from Lights were released as singles: "Drive My Soul", "February Air", and "Ice". These songs, along with "The Last Thing on Your Mind", were later reworked and included on Lights' debut album, The Listening (2009).

Lights peaked at number 27 on the Billboard Top Heatseekers albums chart. Matthew Chisling of Allmusic remarked that the EP "found a large amount of commercial success" and "critical praise"—including Lights' 2009 Juno Award for New Artist of the Year—which led Warner Bros. to allow Lights to release The Listening almost a year later.

== Track listing ==
No.	Title	Writer(s)	Producer(s)	Length
1.	"Ice"	Lights Poxleitner, Thomas Salter	Poxleitner, Salter	2:57
2.	"Drive My Soul"	Poxleitner, Salter	Poxleitner, Salter	3:22
3.	"February Air"	Poxleitner, Dave Thomson	Poxleitner, Thomson	3:50
4.	"White"	Poxleitner, Salter	Poxleitner, Salter	3:20
5.	"I Owe You One"	Poxleitner	Poxleitner	3:39
6.	"The Last Thing on Your Mind"	Poxleitner	Poxleitner, Thomson	3:21
