= Drive My Soul =

Single by Lights

from the EP Lights and the album The Listening
- Released: March 11, 2008
- Recorded: 2007
- Studio: Sony ATV Launch Pad Studios (Toronto, ON)
- Genre: Synthpop; alternative rock
- Length: 3:22
- Label: Underground
- Songwriters: Lights Poxleitner; Thomas "Tawgs" Salter
- Producers: Lights; Tawgs Salter

Lights singles chronology
"Drive My Soul" (2008)	"February Air" (2008)

"Drive My Soul" is the debut single by Canadian singer-songwriter Lights from her debut self-titled EP. It was released as the EP's lead single on March 11, 2008, in Canada and July 24, 2008, in the United States. The song reached number 18 on the Billboard Canadian Hot 100 and was certified gold by Music Canada for digital sales of over 40,000. It was later included on her debut album, The Listening.

== Background ==
"Drive My Soul" is about the element in your life that you cannot live without and without it you feel lost and lose control. Lights said that this element could be anything you feel drives your soul and keeps you in the right path: your parents, a friend, or even something supernatural or a religious element.

Lights has stated that "Drive My Soul" was actually a song where she had the title first before she even wrote the lyrics. She's said it all started when she was listening to an indie radio station, and heard a song which she thought had the lyrics "Drive My Soul" sung in a really beautiful way. After hearing the song, Lights, searched for the lyrics and to her surprise the lyrics "Drive My Soul" were never used in the song she heard. When she was searching for ideas to write, she went back to the title of "Drive My Soul" for her own song.

== Music video ==
The music video features Lights as Barbarella in a campy, 1960s-style science fiction film theme, and her romantic relationship with an astronaut. Lights has mentioned that the astronaut can represent anything that you want. The video's astronaut is played by her father, Eric Poxleitner. Directed by Sean Michael Turrell, the video premiered September 22, 2008.

It starts with Lights sitting on her bed reading a comic (presumably the one she had written in "Saviour") when she looks out the window and sees something glowing. A purple planet can be seen from the window. She gets up and looks into her binoculars. She sees an astronaut roasting marshmallows on the planet. The astronaut appears to notice; he looks up at Earth with interest. Lights then walks over to her computer and inserts a map of Earth. After pressing a couple of buttons, she creates a spaceship and drives out of the city and into space. As Lights zooms through space towards the purple planet, a comet hits the ship and it crashes into the purple planet. As the dust clears, Lights walks toward the astronaut and grabs his hand. The two walk away together, and the video ends with a shot of the comic that Lights was reading. It details her meeting with the astronaut, and at the bottom it says "to be continued". That comes to "February Air".

The video reached number one on MuchMusic's Countdown for the week of January 8, 2009.

== Uses in other media ==
The song was featured on the hit TV series The Hills. It was also used in an Old Navy women's swimwear commercial in 2008.

== Track listing ==
Drive My Soul / February Air Digital 45
No.	Title	Writer(s)	Producer(s)	Length
1.	"Drive My Soul"	Lights Poxleitner; Thomas "Tawgs" Salter	Lights; Salter	3:21
2.	"February Air"	Poxleitner; Dave "Dwave" Thomson	Lights; Thomson	3:50
Total length:				7:11

== Charts ==
=== Weekly charts ===
Chart (2008–09)	Peak position
Canada Hot 100 (Billboard)	18
Canada AC (Billboard)	4
Canada CHR/Top 40 (Billboard)	11
Canada Hot AC (Billboard)	8

=== Year-end charts ===
Chart (2008)	Position
Canada (Canadian Hot 100)	70

== Certifications ==
Region	Certification	Certified units/sales
Canada (Music Canada)	Gold	20,000^{*}
^{*} Sales figures based on certification alone.

== Release history ==
Country	Date	Format	Label	Ref.
Canada	March 11, 2008	Digital download	Underground	
United States	July 24, 2008	Digital download	Warner Bros.	
Canada	July 14, 2009	Digital 7" single	LIGHTS Music	
