= Tony Doogan =

Scottish record producer

Tony Doogan is a Scottish record producer who runs Castle of Doom Studios in Glasgow. He is perhaps best known for his work with Mogwai and Belle & Sebastian. He has also worked with numerous other artists, including The Mountain Goats, Teenage Fanclub, the Delgados, Wintersleep, Els Amics de les Arts, Hefner, Oohyo and the Young Knives on their album Superabundance. He began working on sound recordings when he was 14, helping the PA guy at his local church with the amateur shows being performed there. He has also collaborated with producer Dave Fridmann, whom he originally met when working on the Delgados' album The Great Eastern, on Wintersleep's album Hello Hum.
