= Dependent Music =

- Founded: Yarmouth, Nova Scotia (1994)
- Founder: Brian Borcherdt
- Status: Defunct
- Distributor: Outside Music
- Genre: Indie rock
- Country of origin: Canada
- Official website: www.dependentmusic.com

Dependent Music was a Canadian independent record label, owned and operated by the artists that were a part of the collective. Dependent Music was formed by Brian Borcherdt in Yarmouth, Nova Scotia in 1994. Artists who have released material on Dependent include Contrived, Brian Borcherdt, Jill Barber, Burnt Black, Heavy Meadows, Holy Fuck, Junior Blue, Land of Talk, The Motes and Wintersleep.

== Releases ==
dp001 burnt black, happy

dp002 christopher robin device, self-titled
dp003 christopher robin device, waster
dp004 burnt black, nervous wreck
dp005 chiselhand, self-titled
dp006 burnt black, a demonstration
dp007 christopher robin device, lowest form of life
dp008 burnt black, burned out
dp009 kary, the sound of beauty breathing
dp010 trephines, self-titled
dp011 brian borcherdt, "moth" ep
dp012 contrived, pursuit of plots
dp013 heavy meadows, self-titled 2 - lp
dp014 wintersleep, self-titled
dp015 junior blue, the search for the solid gold
dp016 contrived, this is why the stars...
dp017 kary, light
dp018 jill barber, oh heart
dp019 remains of brian borcherdt, self-titled
dp020 extra virgin, nude combinations
dp021 heavy meadows, self-titled 3
dp022 the motes, remains of false starts
dp023 wintersleep, untitled
dp024 remains of brian borcherdt, the remains of...
dp025 contrived, dead air verbatim
dp026 holy fuck, self-titled
dp027 land of talk, applause cheer boo hiss

dp028 jill barber, for all time

== See also ==
- List of record labels
