= Holy Fuck =

Canadian electronica band

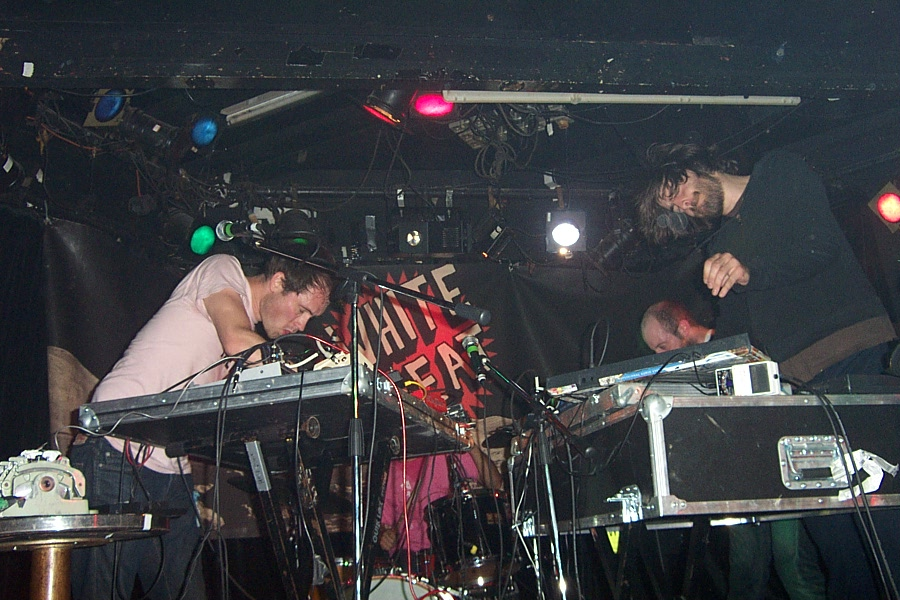
- Holy Fuck performing at White Heat in 2007

Background information
- Origin: Toronto, Ontario, Canada
- Genres: Electronica, electronic rock, electro-industrial, noise rock, math rock
- Years active: 2004–present
- Labels: Dependent; Young; Innovative Leisure
- Members: Brian Borcherdt; Graham Walsh; Matt "Punchy" McQuaid; Matt Schulz
- Past members: Kevin Lynn; Mike Bigelow; Glenn Milchem; Loel Campbell; Brad Kilpatrick
- Website: holyfuckmusic.com

Holy Fuck is a Canadian electronica band from Toronto. They were a part of Dependent Music, a music label and artist collective that began in Yarmouth, Nova Scotia in 2004 until its closing. They were then a part of the Young Turks label, and in 2016 they signed with Innovative Leisure.

The band uses live instrumentation and miscellaneous instruments and non-instruments (including a 35 mm film synchronizer, toy keyboards and toy phaser guns) to achieve electronic-sounding effects without the use of laptops or programmed backing tracks. According to Pitchfork Media, "The band was formed with the intent of creating the equivalent of modern electronic music without actually using the techniques—looping, splicing, programming and the like—of that music."

== History ==
Since their formation in 2004, Holy Fuck have performed at Coachella (supporting Brooklyn rapper Beans who recruited the band to serve as his backing unit), the CMJ Music Marathon, the Halifax Pop Explosion, POP Montreal, the Montreal Jazz Festival, All Tomorrow's Parties, Vegoose, Evolve Festival, Lollapalooza, Osheaga Festival, Rifflandia Music Festival, and the SXSW music festival in Austin, Texas in 2006, 2007 and 2008. In the summer of 2007, Holy Fuck performed at the Glastonbury Festival, the largest music festival in the world, where they were named the No. 3 top new act at the festival by NME magazine. They performed at Lollapalooza in 2008, replacing Noah and the Whale, and returned to headline the London Ontario Live Arts Festival.

Their music can also be frequently heard in the 4th and 5th seasons of the Canadian comedy television series Kenny vs. Spenny.

On August 30, 2009, Holy Fuck played the Virgin Mobile FreeFest dance stage at Merriweather Post Pavilion, Columbia, Maryland.

Before Holy Fuck, Borcherdt was a member of the band By Divine Right, Burnt Black and Cafe' Selectronique with Doug Barron (Hal Harbour) and Phollop Willing PA.

Their debut album, Holy Fuck, recorded with Laurence Currie and Dave Newfeld (Broken Social Scene, Apostle of Hustle), was named one of the Montreal Mirror's top ten albums of 2005.

Holy Fuck have toured the United States with Wolf Parade, Super Furry Animals, Enon, !!!, Mouse on Mars, Cornelius, and Do Make Say Think. They went on a European tour with Buck 65 in early 2006.

In January 2006, they were named one of ten finalists for the $3,000 Galaxie Rising Stars Award of the CBC, which is part of Canadian Music Week's Indie Awards held in March.

The band released their second album, entitled LP, in 2007. The album was nominated for Alternative Album of the Year at the 2008 Juno Awards, and was also shortlisted for the Canadian Polaris Music Prize.

In 2008 Holy Fuck added a remix of "Nude" by Radiohead to Radiohead's remix website, where Internet users could vote for the best remix. Holy Fuck's remix had the top spot for a time.

They also toured venues in North America with M.I.A. in 2007 and 2008. In 2008 former Enon drummer Matt Schulz joined the band during their live performances.

In August 2008, the Ottawa Citizen and others reported that the ruling federal Conservatives had issued a talking points memo regarding the cancellation of the PromArt program, funding international promotional tours by Canadian artists. The memo justified the cancellation on the grounds that its recipients included, among other notables, "a rock band that uses an expletive as part of its name", apparently referring to Holy Fuck. The band took offense at this suggestion. In an interview, the band said regarding their name: "It's been pretty annoying, but it's gotten us a lot of publicity, so we can't complain about that."

Brian Borcherdt took time away from the band to support his next solo album, Coyotes, which was released on October 7, 2008.

The track 'They're Going to Take My Thumbs" appears in the first episode of Season 2 of Breaking Bad. "Royal Gregory" was used in the 2008 video game Midnight Club: Los Angeles as well as in the official trailer for the game. The song "Lovely Allen" can be heard in a Dodge Chrysler Jeep commercial and in the Season 2 episode "eps2.1_k3rnel-pan1c.ksd" of the series Mr. Robot.

In 2009 Holy Fuck took part in an interactive documentary series called City Sonic. The series, which featured 20 Toronto artists, had Brian Borcherdt reflecting on his time at Sneaky Dees.

Holy Fuck's third full-length studio album, Latin was released May 11, 2010, through Young Turks and XL Recordings. In the United States, the album reached No. 14 on the Billboard Dance charts and No. 40 on the Heatseekers chart. The song "Latin America" was featured in Scott Pilgrim vs. The World. The band were chosen by Les Savy Fav to perform at the ATP Nightmare Before Christmas festival that they co-curated in December 2011 in Minehead, England.

The band's fourth full-length studio album, Congrats, was released on May 27, 2016, on Innovative Leisure and Last Gang Records.

Borcherdt & Walsh have also done production, writing and extra instrumentation on the album Siberia by Canadian singer Lights.

Graham Walsh has produced and recorded albums for Canadian bands including METZ, Alvvays, Viet Cong, Doomsquad, Hannah Georgas, and Operators.

The band's fifth album, Deleter, was released on January 17, 2020, on Last Gang Records. The band released a video for the new single "Luxe" featuring Hot Chip's Alexis Taylor.

In 2021, the band received some mainstream attention after their song "Tom Tom" was used in episode 2 of the Amazon Prime series Invincible, based on the Image Comics series of the same name.

In January 2026, the band released the lead single, "Evie", for their upcoming album Event Beat. In March, the band released a remix of "Tom Tom" titled "Tom Tom - Flaxans Version", which was used in the fourth season of Invincible to mark the return of the Flaxans.

Event Beat was longlisted for the 2026 Polaris Music Prize.

== Band members ==
=== Current ===
- Brian Borcherdt – vocals, keyboards, synthesizer, effects, guitar, lap steel (2004–present)
- Graham Walsh – keyboards, synthesizer, effects, turntables, sampler, vocals (2005–present)
- Matt Schulz – drums (2006, 2008, 2010–present)
- Matt "Punchy" McQuaid – bass, synthesizer, guitar (2009–present)

=== Former ===
- Dylan Hudeckie – bass (2005)
- Johnny Smith – drums (2005)
- Kevin Lynn – bass (2005–2006)
- Glenn Milchem – drums (2005–2006)
- Mike Bigelow – bass (2006–2009)
- Loel Campbell – drums (2006–2007)
- Brad Kilpatrick – drums (2007–2008, 2008–2010)

== Discography ==
=== Albums ===
List of studio albums, with year released and chart positions
Title	Year	Peak chart positions						
Title	Year	BEL (Vl)	GRE	NLD Alt	UK	UK Indie	US Elec	US Heat
Holy Fuck	2005	—	—	—	—	—	—	—
LP	2007	—	—	—	—	50	22	—
Latin	2010	67	6	14	171	18	14	40
Congrats	2016	166	—	—	—	—	15	—
Deleter	2020	—	—	—	—	—	—	—
Event Beat	2026	—	—	—	—	—	—	—

=== EPs and singles ===
- Holy Fuck EP CD and 7" vinyl (2007)
- 12" split vinyl with Celebration (2007)
- Lovely Allen 7" and 12" vinyl (2008)
- 12" split vinyl with Foals (2008)
- + Ghost (2010)
- Bird Brains (2017)
- Luxe (2019)
- Free Gloss (2019)
- Deleters (2020)
- Evie (2026)
