= 2013 East Coast Music Awards =

- Date: March 10, 2013
- Location: Cunard Centre, Halifax, Nova Scotia
- Hosted by: Rose Cousins; David Myles

Television/radio coverage
- Network: Eastlink TV

The 2013 East Coast Music Awards were held on March 10, 2013, to honour achievements in Atlantic Canada's music industry in 2012. The ceremony, the event's 25th anniversary, was held at the Cunard Centre in Halifax, Nova Scotia, and was hosted by singer-songwriters Rose Cousins and David Myles.

Cousins herself was one of the event's big winners, winning three awards for her album We Have Made a Spark and it's single "Go First". The rock band The Stanfields won two awards, Group Album of the Year and the Fan's Choice Entertainer of the Year.

The event also featured a video tribute to country music legend Stompin' Tom Connors, who died just a few days before the event.

== Nominees and winners ==
Fan's Choice Entertainer of the Year	Fan's Choice Video of the Year
The Stanfields; Rich Aucoin; George Canyon; Tim Chaisson; Dave Gunning; Gypsophilia; David Myles; The Once; Joel Plaskett Emergency; The Trews; Wintersleep	George Canyon, "Saddle Up"; Rich Aucoin, "It"; Tim Chaisson, "Beat This Heart"; The Divorcees, "The Crows"; Gloryhound, "Electric Dusk"; Matt Mays, "Take It on Faith"; David Myles, "Long Dark Night"; The Once, "You're My Best Friend"; Radio Radio, "Gong Hotel"; Wintersleep, "In Came the Flood"
Aboriginal Recording of the Year	African-Canadian Recording of the Year
Lone Cloud, We Are Medicine People; City Natives, City Natives; Gary Sappier Band, Gary Sappier Blues Band; Old Self, Who?; Kam Speech FKA Speechless, Dangerous Methods	Cam Smith, Ocean Blue; Jon Samuel, First Transmission; Stahmenah, Shades of the Heart; Stack Loot Divide, Now It's Time
Album of the Year	Blues Recording of the Year
Matt Mays, Coyote; Jenn Grant, The Beautiful Wild; Gypsophilia, Constellation; Radio Radio, Havre de Grace; Wintersleep, Hello Hum	Charlie A'Court, Triumph & Disaster; Chris Martin and the Trouble Shooters, A Whole 'Nother Thang; LeeBoy, Better Man Blues; Shirley Jackson and Her Good Rockin' Daddys, When the Money's All Gone; Working Class, Restless
Children's Recording of the Year	Classical Composition of the Year
Donna & Andy, La vie pour moi; Coach Patt, Coach Patt; Jamie Junger, Fishin' for Pickles; Pistachio Mike, Where My G's At?; Scotty and the Stars, Time to Get Up	Derek Charke, Between the Shore and the Ships; Jérôme Blais, Mouvance; Robert Bauer, The Dykes of Acadie; Scott Macmillan, La Victoire; Steven Naylor, Aboiteau
Classical Recording of the Year	Country Recording of the Year
Helen Pridmore and Wesley Ferriera, Between the Shore and the Ships; Edmund Dawe and Lynn Johnson, Dialogue; Sageev Oore and Dani Oore, Radical Cycle; David Rogosin, Evocation; Saint John String Quartet, Saint John String Quartet & Jacques Dupriez	RyLee Madison, Where Does the Time Go; The Heavy Horses, Murder Ballads & Other Love Songs; The Keats, Free At Last; Tonya Kennedy, He's Everything You're Not; Josh Macumber, Josh Macumber Was Here
Electronic Recording of the Year	Folk Recording of the Year
English Words, Red Potion; In Dreams, Sleepwalk; Steven Naylor, Lieux imaginaires; Sp00nfed, Sweet Fades EP; Joshua Van Tassel, Joshua Van Tassel	Rose Cousins, We Have Made a Spark; Ben Caplan, In the Time of the Great Remembering; Dave Gunning, No More Pennies; David Myles, Into the Sun; Gabrielle Papillon, Little Bug
Francophone Recording of the Year	Gospel Recording of the Year
Vishtèn, Mōsaïk; Lisa LeBlanc, Lisa LeBlanc; Pascal Lejeune, Le bruit des machines; Monique Poirier, Parler de paradis; Radio Radio, Havre de Grâce	Stephanie Mainville, Old Man Winter; Matt Brouwer, Till the Sunrise; Kingswood University Chorale, You Are Holy; Life Support, Life Support Live; Eleanor McCain, Holiday
Group Recording of the Year	Jazz Recording of the Year
The Stanfields, Death & Taxes; The Dardanelles, The Eastern Light; Madison Violet, The Good in Goodbye; Paper Lions, At Long Creek; Wintersleep, Hello Hum	Joel Miller, Swim; Will Fisher, Portage; Matt MacDougall, Familiar Faces; Ian Toms, Playbook; Jeff Torbert, Urban Poultry & Other Hopes
Pop Recording of the Year	R&B/Soul Recording of the Year
Jenn Grant, The Beautiful Wild; Rich Aucoin, We're All Dying to Live; Heather Green, Your Last War; Christina Martin, Sleeping with a Stranger; Paper Lions, At Long Creek	Charlie A'Court, Triumph & Disaster; Eileen Joyce, Life Is Too Short; Chris Kirby, Wonderizer; Gary Sappier Band, Gary Sappier Blues Band; Working Class, Restless
Rap/Hip-Hop Recording of the Year	Rising Star Recording of the Year
Radio Radio, Havre de Grâce; Mischif, Supernova; Quake Matthews, The Book of Matthew; Sampson, iLL-Mannered; Cam Smith, Ocean Blue	Ben Caplan, In the Time of the Great Remembering; Heather Green, Your Last War; Mo Kenney, Mo Kenney; Breagh Mackinnon, Where the Days Went; Repartee, Repartee
Rock Recording of the Year	Roots/Traditional Group Recording of the Year
Joel Plaskett Emergency, Scrappy Happiness; Long Distance Runners, Tracks; Matt Mays, Coyote; The Stanfields, Death & Taxes; Wintersleep, Hello Hum	The Once, Row Upon Row of the People They Know; The Barra MacNeils, The Barra MacNeils Live with Symphony Nova Scotia; The Dardanelles, The Eastern Light; Mary Jane Lamond and Wendy MacIsaac, Seinn; Vishtèn, Mōsaïk
Roots/Traditional Solo Recording of the Year	Solo Recording of the Year
Tim Chaisson, The Other Side; Jim Dorie, Ghosts of Pictou County; Larry Foley, Free & Easy; Bruce Guthro, Celtic Crossing; Fleur Mainville, Once	Rose Cousins, We Have Made a Spark; Chris Kirby, Wonderizer; Jenn Grant, The Beautiful Wild; Matt Mays, Coyote; Raylene Rankin, All the Diamonds
Song of the Year	Songwriter of the Year
Dave Gunning, "These Hands"; Rich Aucoin, "It"; Tim Chaisson, "Beat This Heart"; Rose Cousins, "The Darkness"; Ria Mae, "Leaving Today"	Rose Cousins, "Go First"; Bruce Guthro, "Stan's Tune"; Christina Martin, "Marina"; Matt Mays, "Take it on Faith"; Paul Murphy, Tim D'Eon and Loel Campbell, "In Came the Flood" (Wintersleep)
Traditional Instrumental Recording of the Year	World recording of the Year
Natalie MacMaster, Cape Breton Girl; Dwayne Côté and Duane Andrews, The Empress; Dominique Dupuis, Dominique Dupuis; Darren McMullen, Shoes for Molly; Sprag Session, Sprag Session	Gypsophilia, Constellation; Andru Branch, Step Into the Light; Shaun Ferguson, Ascensions; Stack Loot Divide, Now It's Time; Stahmenah, Shades of the Heart
