= The Olympic Symphonium =

Canadian indie folk trio

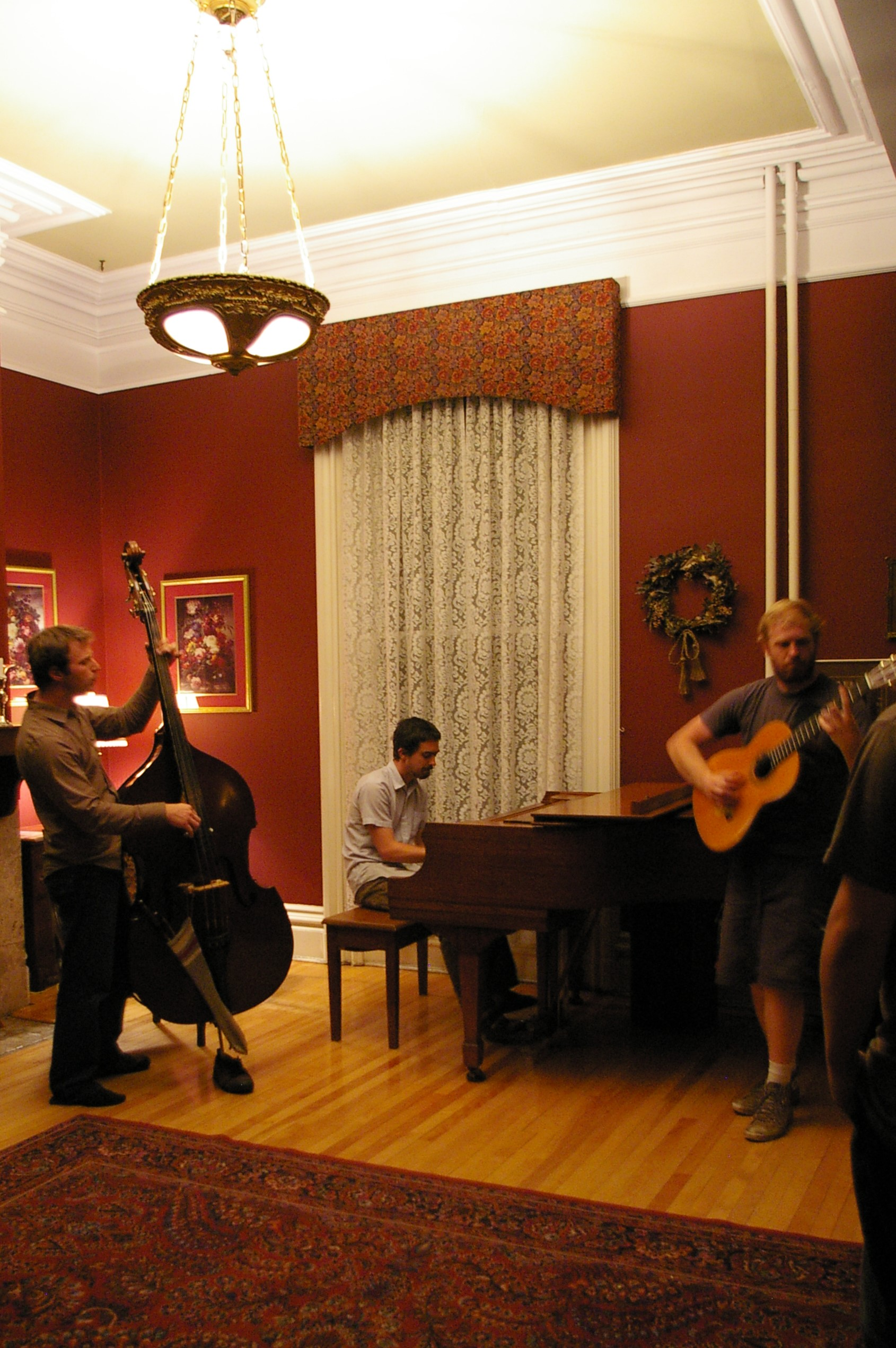
- The Olympic Symphonium, July 2008

Background information
- Origin: Fredericton, New Brunswick, Canada
- Genres: indie folk
- Years active: 2005–present
- Label: Forward Music Group
- Members: Kyle Cunjak; Nick Cobham; Graeme Walker; Dennis Goodwin
- Website: theolympicsymphonium.com

The Olympic Symphonium is a Canadian indie folk trio from Fredericton, New Brunswick. The band consists of Nick Cobham (guitar), Kyle Cunjak (bass, guitar), and Graeme Walker (guitar, bass). All three musicians swap instruments and take turns singing and songwriting, and are often joined by Dennis Goodwin (lap steel, guitar, banjo) and Bob Deveau (drums).

== History ==
The band was formed in 2005 when Walker who had written songs that didn't fit the style of his primary band, Grand Theft Bus, invited Cunjak and Cobham, two friends who had also written a number of songs that didn't fit their other bands, to join a new side project.

They released their debut album, Chapter One, in 2007, and sold out of the limited pressings while playing various shows around Atlantic Canada and Quebec. They followed it up with 2008's More in Sorrow Than In Anger, an album that included collaboration with a number of Canadian artists including Catherine MacLellan, Dale Murray, Jenn Grant, Amelia Curran, Joel Leblanc (Hot Toddy), and Rose Cousins. They toured in North America, and twice in the UK, stopping to record a session at the BBC with Bob Harris.

They recorded The City Won't Have Time to Fight in 2011 in an abandoned house in Fredericton. To mark the album's release, they organized a weekend music event, Shivering Songs, which featured performances by a variety of the band's friends and collaborators, including Rose Cousins, Catherine MacLellan, David Myles, Snailhouse, Olenka Krakus, and Grant Lawrence.

In late 2012, they recorded Chance To Fate in the Salty Towers Inn in seaside St. Andrews, New Brunswick. This album marked the first time the band hired an outside producer, Joshua Van Tassel. It won 'Recording of the Year' at the 2014 Music New Brunswick awards and was nominated for an East Coast Music Award in 2015. In between, the band performed around North America, including the Atlin Arts & Music Festival outside of Whitehorse and a Stompin' Tom Tribute Concert in Toronto.

In 2018, the band recorded their fifth album, Beauty in the Tension, at The Old Confidence Lodge, a converted Oddfellows Lodge in Riverport, Nova Scotia, and have been performing Neil Young cover sets. The band performed at the Halifax Urban Folk Festival, and was nominated as Folk Artist of the Year at the Music New Brunswick awards.

== Discography ==
- Chapter One (2007)
- More in Sorrow Than in Anger (2008)
- The City Won't Have Time to Fight (2011)
- Chance To Fate (2014)
- Beauty in the Tension (2018)
