= Ola Volo =

Kazakh Canadian artist

Ola Volo (born 1989) is a Kazakh Canadian artist, best known as a public muralist. Her style blends aspects of Eastern European folk art with a focus on pattern and narrative to depict fantasy scenes.

Born in Kazakhstan, she moved to Canada with her family at age 10, and studied art at Emily Carr University of Art and Design.

Volo has been commissioned by companies like Hootsuite, Lululemon, and Starbucks and has created numerous works around the Vancouver area where she previously resided.

In 2021, Volo was asked to create mural to bring awareness to the rise of abuse against women due to COVID-19.

== Career ==
Her work has included neighbourhood murals and corporate commissioned work in Vancouver, the Mackey Building in Sudbury as part of the 2016 Up Here Festival, and Walla Volo in Montreal's Mile End neighbourhood, the largest mural in Canada painted by a woman.

She designed the cover art for Matt Mays' album Once Upon a Hell of a Time, and is the subject of the album's song "Ola Volo".

Volo's art has been used as product labels such as the ones for Doan's Craft Brewing Company located in East Vancouver as well as painting a mural for the company's tasting room.

In 2017, Volo created a mural for the Forge, a parking area located in Granville Island. Despite being a muralist, exhibiting her process live while in the presence of visitors as well as interacting with them was new to Volo.

She participated in the National Newspaper Week in 2021 by designing a print to spread awareness about the importance and reliability provided by newspapers.

== Personal life ==
Due to Volo's popularity in Vancouver, it led to a brief break from the city and a new studio set up in Montréal. The stay in the city allowed Volo rest and time to reflect as well as inspiration for her WALLA VOLO mural.

== YWCA Wall For Women ==
Located at Hyatt Regency along Burrard Street is Volo's mural called Wall for Women. With the familiar influence of Eastern European folk art present in Volo's works, this mural was done with the intention to spread awareness on the rise in relationship violence against women which has been a prevalent issue during COVID-19 as well as a symbol of empowerment.

Integrated in the mural are five QR codes containing information about domestic abuse as well as a way to donate and provide aid to women suffering from mistreatment.

== List of works ==
- Arts Factory mural (2016)
- Mural for Up Here Festival (2016)
- Doan's Craft Beer Company labels and mural (2016)
- Granville Island mural (2017)
- Walla Volo (2019)
- YWCA Wall For Women (2021)
- Champions (2021)
