= A New Tradition =

EP by Snailhouse
- Released: 2001
- Genre: Indie rock
- Label: Snailhouse Institute For The Recording Arts

Snailhouse chronology
Fine (Re-Release) (1999)	A New Tradition (2001)	The Opposite Is Also True (2001)

A New Tradition is an EP by the artist Snailhouse. It was released in 2001 on the label The Snailhouse Institute For The Recording Arts, and is distributed by Scratch Records. The bonus track features lead vocals by Doug Tielli.

== Track listing ==
1. "The Medicine Makes My Heart Beat A Little Faster"
2. "Twenty One Years"
3. "Bell"
4. "Witches And Snowmen"
5. "Turn That Awful Music Off"
6. (Untitled Bonus Track)
