= A Spoonful of Sugar =

Song from 1964 film by Walt Disney

- 1964 U.S. release of the Marni Nixon recording

Single by Julie Andrews

from the album Mary Poppins: Original Cast Soundtrack
- Released: 1964
- Genre: Musical, soundtrack
- Length: 4:29
- Label: Disneyland
- Songwriters: Richard M. Sherman, Robert B. Sherman
- From the film Mary Poppins

"A Spoonful of Sugar" is a song from Walt Disney's 1964 film and 2004 musical version of Mary Poppins, composed by Robert B. Sherman and Richard M. Sherman. The song has characteristics of the fast-paced one-step, a popular dance in the 1910s.

== In-film context ==
It is an uptempo song sung by Mary Poppins (Julie Andrews), instructing the two children, Jane (Karen Dotrice) and Michael (Matthew Garber) to clean their room. Although the task is daunting, she tells them, with a good attitude, it can be fun. The melody is heard throughout the film as Mary's leitmotif.

== In-musical context ==
In the musical, Robertson Ay and Mrs. Brill are helping Mrs. Banks for a tea party she's planning. Mrs. Brill tells Robertson Ay to make the frosting, which the kids try to do instead, despite Robertson Ay giving them warnings. After Jane sends him to get hot water, it comes out with the force of a cannon and causes Robertson Ay to run into the furniture, destroying the kitchen in the process. Mrs. Banks is shocked to see the kitchen in this shape when she arrives there with Mary Poppins. Mary sends her upstairs to get dressed, while she gives Jane and Michael some medicine, which comes out in different colors and flavors, much like in the film. Cleaning the kitchen up is similar to cleaning up the nursery in the film with Mary magically putting it back together.

== Other Disney uses ==
The song is mixed with It's A Small World, also a Sherman song in the final number of On the Record, a short lived revue of Disney songs.

This musical number also appears in the Sing Along Songs series of Disney videos.

== Development ==
Julie Andrews was not yet committed for the part of Mary Poppins. She did not like the song that was written for her, believing it did not have enough snap to it. The original song was called "The Eyes of Love". Walt Disney instructed the Sherman Brothers to come up with something more catchy. Robert Sherman, the primary lyricist of the duo, arrived home from work one evening, having worked all day trying to come up with a song idea. As he walked in the door, his wife, Joyce, informed him that the children had gotten their polio vaccine that day. Thinking that the child had received a shot, Robert asked his son, Jeffrey, if it hurt. The child responded that the medicine was put on a cube of sugar and that he swallowed it. Realizing what he had, Robert Sherman arrived at work early the next morning with the title of the song "A Spoonful of Sugar Helps the Medicine Go Down". Sherman suggested the lyric to his brother, Richard, who was at first dismissive but slowly came around. At his brother's behest, Richard put melody to the lyric, and with that, the song was born.

== Covers ==
- Harry Connick, Jr. released a jazz cover on Songs I Heard in 2001.
- Matt Mays recorded an indie rock version from his album When the Angels Make Contact.
- Kacey Musgraves recorded a country rendition on We Love Disney in 2015.

== In popular culture ==
On the television show How I Met Your Mother, in the episode "Last Words", the character Robin Scherbatsky (portrayed by Cobie Smulders) implies to her friend, Ted Mosby (portrayed by Josh Radnor), that it is naive and childish of him to believe that what the kids were given with their medicine truly was sugar, rather implying that what the children were actually given with their medicine was (crack) cocaine, referencing the fact that the kids, at one point in the movie, attempted to jump into paintings with Poppins.

In Shrek the Third, after Queen Lillian (played by Andrews) breaks down the prison walls, she starts humming part of the melody to the song.

After Poppins is melted by the Wicked Witch of the West in Cheshire Crossing, her reconstitution is accelerated after her remains are placed in bathwater and she is provided a teaspoon of table sugar.

== Certifications ==
Region	Certification	Certified units/sales
United Kingdom (BPI)	Silver	200,000^{‡}
United States (RIAA)	Gold	500,000^{‡}
^{‡} Sales+streaming figures based on certification alone.
