= When the Angels Make Contact =

...When the Angels Make Contact

Studio album by Matt Mays
- Released: November 7, 2006
- Recorded: Halifax and Dartmouth, Nova Scotia
- Genres: Psychedelic rock, Art Rock, Indie rock
- Length: 63:58
- Label: Sonic
- Producers: Matt Mays; Tim Jim Baker

Matt Mays chronology
Matt Mays & El Torpedo (2005)	...When the Angels Make Contact (2006)	Terminal Romance (2008)

Professional ratings
Review scores
Source	Rating
Allmusic	3.5/5 stars

...When the Angels Make Contact is the third album by Matt Mays, released in 2006.

== Track listing ==
All songs written by Matt Mays, except where noted.

No.	Title	Writer(s)	Length
1.	"Intro"		0:48
2.	"The Past"		4:26
3.	"When the Angels Make Contact"	Mays, Rich Terfry	4:13
4.	"1 for the Motor"		3:36
5.	"Spoonful of Sugar"	Mays, Adam Puddington, Dale Murray, Sherman Brothers	7:21
6.	"Never Saw It Comin'"		3:11
7.	"Officer Downe"	Mays, Tim Jim Baker	1:41
8.	"Heroine"		3:12
9.	"850 Commando"		5:12
10.	"The Dartmouth Soundsystem"	Mays, Baker	2:07
11.	"Midnight is the Time"		4:16
12.	"You'll Never Come Back"		3:01
13.	"The Highway is a Scary Place"	Robbie Crowell	1:15
14.	"Under My Senses"		4:08
15.	"When the Angels Make Contact (Reprise)"	Mays, Terfry	1:15
16.	"Rough N' Tumble Come Down"		4:14
17.	"J.J.'s Theme"	Mays, Murray	4:04
18.	"Mornin' Sun"		6:03
Total length:			63:58

== Film ==
This album was originally planned to be the soundtrack for a film of the same name, directed by Matt Mays and Drew Lightfoot. Although Mays has said the filming is complete, funding ran out before production was completed and the project has been indefinitely shelved. Sam Roberts and Buck 65 are featured in the movie, (Buck 65 plays the character on the album cover) The movie trailer, music video and live performance are on the When The Angels Make Contact web page.
