= Lies on the Prize =

Studio album by Snailhouse
- Released: July 1, 2008
- Genre: Indie rock
- Label: Unfamiliar Records

Snailhouse chronology
The Silence Show (2005)	Lies on the Prize (2008)

Lies on the Prize is the fifth album by Canadian indie rock artist Snailhouse. It was released in July 2008 on the Unfamiliar Records label.

== Award nominations ==
Lies on the Prize was longlisted for the 2009 Polaris Music Prize.

== Track listing ==
1. Dollar Signs
2. (Not) Superstitious
3. Salvation Army
4. Tone Deaf Birds
5. They Won't Believe You
6. Who We Are
7. Mahogany
8. O My God
9. Fire Alarm
10. Blue Sun
11. Born in the City
12. Tell Me What You Want
13. Homesick
