= Minor Hope =

Live album by Gypsophilia
- Released: 2007
- Recorded: January 26–27, 2007
- Studio: The Sonic Temple, Halifax, Nova Scotia
- Length: 54:23
- Producer: Gypsophilia

Minor Hope is a jazz album by Canadian band Gypsophilia, recorded in January 2007 and released in May 2007.

The album is Gypsophilia's first, and inspired their first major tour the following year. It was recorded in front of a live audience over two nights at The Sonic Temple recording studio in Halifax, Nova Scotia. It was nominated for Jazz Recording of the Year at the 2008 Nova Scotia Music Awards and East Coast Music Awards.

== Track listing ==
1. "Gyre" (Alec Frith) – 5:38
2. "HIV Jump" (Daniel Oore) – 5:46
3. "Sebo Psoriatic Psongs" (Daniel Oore) – 4:25
4. "Nicole's Song" (Nick Wilkinson) – 5:19
5. "Salle Verte" (Nick Wilkinson, Alec Frith) - 4:51
6. "Will You Come on a Picnic" (Daniel Oore) - 3:55
7. "Special Shoes" (Nick Wilkinson) - 3:29
8. "kfeetz kfotz" (Daniel Oore) - 1:26
9. "Vulnerable" (Daniel Oore) – 3:42
10. "Minor Hope" (Daniel Oore) – 7:57
11. "{Mental}/{Joy Theme}" (Daniel Oore) – 4:44
12. "Ocelot" (Daniel Oore) – 3:11
13. "A Suitcase Waltz" (Adam Fine, Nick Wilkinson, Ross Burns, Alec Frith, Sageev Oore) - 1:48

== Personnel ==
- Nick Wilkinson – guitar
- Sageev Oore – Fender Rhodes, melodica, accordion
- Daniel Oore – sopranino, soprano and baritone saxophones, flute, cymbal
- Alec Frith – guitar
- Adam Fine – double bass
- Ross Burns – guitar
- Gina Burgess – violin
