= Matt Mays + El Torpedo =

Studio album by Matt Mays
- Released: May 10, 2005
- Recorded: March 2005
- Genre: Rock
- Length: 63:52
- Label: Sonic Records, 00:02:59 (US)
- Producer: Don Smith, Matt Mays & El Torpedo

Matt Mays chronology
Matt Mays (2003)	Matt Mays + El Torpedo (2005)	When the Angels Make Contact (2006)

Professional ratings
Review scores
Source	Rating
Allmusic	link

Matt Mays + El Torpedo is the second album by Matt Mays, released in 2005. It is the first with his band El Torpedo.

== Track listing ==
All songs written by Matt Mays, except as noted.

No.	Title	Length
1.	"Stand Down at Sundown"	5:45
2.	"Travellin'"	4:02
3.	"Cocaine Cowgirl"	4:24
4.	"The Plan"	3:32
5.	"Ain't So Heavy"	3:45
6.	"St. George's Lane"	4:57
7.	"Move Your Mind"	3:02
8.	"What Are We Gonna Do Come the Month of September?"	7:39
9.	"Good People"	4:27
10.	"Lost Souls"	3:27
11.	"It Don't Matter"	3:10
12.	"On the Hood"	4:57
13.	"Time of Your Life"	4:27
14.	"Wicked Come Winter"	6:18
Total length:		63:52

== Certifications ==
Certifications for Matt Mays + El Torpedo
Region	Certification	Certified units/sales
Canada (Music Canada)	Gold	50,000^{‡}
^{‡} Sales+streaming figures based on certification alone.
