= Matt Mays (album) =

Studio album by Matt Mays
- Released: 2002
- Recorded: Ultramagnetic Studios; Halifax, Nova Scotia, Canada
- Genre: Rock
- Length: 48:59
- Label: Sonic Records
- Producer: Matt Mays; Charles Austin; Kevin Lewis

Matt Mays chronology
Matt Mays (2002)	Matt Mays + El Torpedo (2005)

Professional ratings
Review scores
Source	Rating
Allmusic	link

Matt Mays is the self-titled debut album by Matt Mays, released in 2002.

== Track listing ==
All songs written by Matt Mays, except as noted.

No.	Title	Length
1.	"Downtown"	4:08
2.	"So Distant"	4:03
3.	"Where Am I Going?"	3:12
4.	"Full July Moon"	5:13
5.	"Lonely Highway Night"	4:32
6.	"Back Home Weather"	7:30
7.	"City of Lakes"	5:16
8.	"Your Heart"	5:17
9.	"Hello Highway"	3:13
10.	"Sometime Soon (Movin' On)"	6:35
Total length:		48:59
