= The Radio Dances =

Studio album by Snailhouse
- Released: 1998
- Genre: Indie rock
- Label: Rhythm of Sickness

Snailhouse chronology
Fine (1994)	The Radio Dances (1998)	urgai (Re-Release) (1999)

The Radio Dances is an album by the artist Snailhouse. It was released in 1998 on Rhythm of Sickness Records, and distributed by Scratch Records.

== Track listing ==
1. Have A Good Time
2. Plans
3. Look What I've Done
4. Accidental Seabirds
5. California Is Always Waiting
6. The Gluepot
7. In Case Of Fire
8. Shipwreck On The Passenger Side
9. All That Will Change
10. Making Light
11. Frost In The Headphones
