= Forward Music Group =

- Founded: 2006
- Founder: Kyle Cunjak; James Boyle; Zach Atkinson
- Status: Active
- Distributors: FAB; Proper Music; Broken Silence; MVD; Sonic Unyon
- Genre: Folk; Contemporary; Indie rock
- Country of origin: Canada
- Location: Halifax, Nova Scotia; Fredericton, New Brunswick
- Official website: forwardmusicgroup.com

Forward Music Group is a Canadian management company and independent record label based in Halifax, Nova Scotia and distributed nationally by FAB.

== Company history ==
Founded in Fredericton, New Brunswick by James Boyle, Kyle Cunjak, and Zach Atkinson in 2006, the team initially provided professional representation for Maritime musical acts, particularly those who found it difficult or impossible to release their music through the area's conventional channels. With a strong focus on aesthetics, presentation, and a grassroots approach to marketing & advertising, FMG have carved out a niche for themselves in the Canadian musical landscape and maintained a close relationship to their fan base.

Forward regularly work with festivals and conferences such as Shivering Songs, the Halifax Jazz Festival, Nova Scotia Music Week and East Coast Music Week to program interesting and intimate events with a variety of musicians both from inside and outside their community. At the 2007 Evolve Festival, one stage, dubbed the "Forward Music Group Stage," featured acts on the label alongside Do Make Say Think and Holy Fuck. At the 2012 festival, Forward programmed music for the yurt stage and staged theatrical performances during the day with fake security guards at the yurt entrance that provoked the public by shooting them with water guns.

They also operate a sister label called Backward Music for experimental music and work with NYC-based Bing & Ruth, Toronto producer/percussionist Joshua Van Tassel, and more.

== Current roster ==
- Michael Feuerstack
- Gianna Lauren
- Joshua Van Tassel
- JOYFULTALK
- Paper Beat Scissors
- Alan Jeffries
- The Olympic Symphonium
- Motherhood
- Cedric Noel
- Century Egg
- Wolf Castle
- Jennah Barry
- Sarah Pagé
- Nick Schofield
- Charbonneau/Amato
- Nico Paulo

== Discography ==
- Nico Paulo - Nico Paulo (2023)
- Cedric Noel - Hang Time (2021)
- Michael Feuerstack - Natural Weather (2018)
- The Olympic Symphonium - Beauty in the Tension (2018)
- Sleepless Nights - Crystal Mountains (2017)
- Paper Beat Scissors - All We Know (2017)
- Gianna Lauren - M o v i n g P a r t s (2017)
- Dan Misha Goldman - Champion of the Afterworld (2017)
- Michael Feuerstack - Adult Lullabies (2016)
- Gianna Lauren - Windows - Single (2015)
- Paper Beat Scissors - Go On (2015)
- Paper Beat Scissors - Go On (2015)
- Gianna Lauren - Mistakes - Single (2015)
- Gypsophilia - Night Swimming (2015)
- Forward Music Group 2015 Sampler (2015)
- Find The Others - Empire of Time (2015)
- Michael Feuerstack - The Forgettable Truth (2015)
- Michael Feuerstack & Associates - Singer Songer (2014)
- The Olympic Symphonium - Chance To Fate (2014)
- The Olympic Symphonium - The City Won't Have Time To Remix (2014)
- Gypsophilia - Horska (2013)
- Michael Feuerstack - Tambourine Death Bed (2013)
- Michael Feuerstack - Shadow / Wolves (2013)
- Paper Beat Scissors - Tendrils / Live at St. Matthew's Church (2013)
- Gianna Lauren - On Personhood (2013)
- Alan Jeffries - Coffee 'Til Midnight (2013)
- Forward Music Group 2013 Sampler (2013)
- Grand Theft Bus - Say it With Me (2012)
- Snailhouse - Lies On The Prize (2012)
- The Olympic Symphonium - Southern Souls Sessions (2012)
- Paper Beat Scissors - Paper Beat Scissors (2012)
- Forward Music Group - Forward Xmas Remix 2011 (2011)
- Forward Music Group - Forward Music Fall 2011 Sampler (2011)
- Gypsophilia - Constellation (2011)
- Snailhouse - Sentimental Gentleman (2011)
- The Olympic Symphonium- The City Won't Have Time To Fight (2011)
- The Olympic Symphonium - Live At The Cohn (2010)
- Gianna Lauren - Some Move Closer, Some Move On (2010)
- The Slate Pacific - Eccentrics and Young Professionals (2010)
- Sleepless Nights - The Communications Barrier (2010)
- The Olympic Symphonium - Chapter 1 (special revised edition) (2010)
- The Slate Pacific - The Safe Passage Remix EP (2010)
- Share - Coco et Co. (2010)
- Sleepless Nights - The Phone Booth Outside The Video Store (2010)
- Sleepless Nights - King Diamond (2009)
- Share- Slumping In Your Murals (2009)
- The Motorleague - Black Noise (2009)
- The Slate Pacific - Safe Passage (2009)
- Sleepless Nights - Jamz (2009)
- The Olympic Symphonium - More In Sorrow Than In Anger (2008)
- Paiens - Pyramyd (2008)
- Forward Music Group - 2008 Sampler (2008)
- Grand Theft Bus - Made Upwards (2008)
- Sleepless Nights - Turn Into Vapour (2007)
- Share - Pedestrian (2007)
- Petunia & the Loons - Petunia & the Loons (2007)
- Grand Theft Bus - Flies In The No Fly (2007)
- The Olympic Symphonium - Chapter 1 (2007)
- The Fussy Part - Ben EP (2007)

== Past roster ==
- Gypsophilia
- Sleepless Nights
- Snailhouse
- Grand Theft Bus
- The Motorleague
- Paiens
- Share
- Petunia & the Loons
- Slate Pacific
- The Fussy Part

== Additional sources ==
- Bruce, Alec (July–August 2012). "Innovation in the minor key" (PDF). Atlantic Business Magazine. Archived from the original (PDF) on 2016-03-04.
