= Motherhood (band) =

Canadian punk rock trio

- Origin: Fredericton, New Brunswick, Canada
- Genres: punk rock
- Years active: 2010–present
- Labels: Forward Music Group
- Members: Brydon Crain; Penelope Stevens; Adam Sipkema
- Website: motherhood.website

Motherhood is a Canadian punk rock trio from Fredericton, New Brunswick. Formed in 2010, the band consists of lead vocalist and guitarist Brydon Crain, bassist/keyboardist/vocalist Penelope Stevens, and drummer Adam Sipkema.

== History ==
Motherhood formed in 2010, in Fredericton, New Brunswick. They released their debut album, Diamonds & Gold (alternatively spelled Diamonds + Gold), in 2013. The following year, they released EP Problems. Motherhood released their second album, Baby Teeth, on June 10, 2016. Their third album Dear Bongo, was released in 2019. In June 2022, Motherhood released their fourth album Winded. Johnny James of Exclaim! gave the album a rating of 7.

In October 2024, the band announced their fifth album Thunder Perfect Mind and released its lead track "Bok Globule". The album was released on January 24, 2025, and was generally praised by critics. The concept behind the album was inspired by concepts that Brydon Crain would come up with in his imagination as he made daily walks along Fredericton's Westmorland Street Bridge for work. Leslie Ken Chu of Exclaim! dubbed it their "most cohesive album yet", giving it a rating of 8. Trev Elkin of God Is in the TV gave the album a rating of 9. Stephan Boissonneault of Cult MTL gave a rating of 8/10.

== Discography ==
=== Studio albums ===
- Diamonds & Gold (2013)
- Baby Teeth (2016) (Note: Some sources, including the band's page, incorrectly dates the release year as 2018.)
- Dear Bongo, (2019)
- Winded (2022)
- Thunder Perfect Mind (2025)

=== EPs ===
- Where Has the Money Gone? (2010)
- After Death (2010)
- Desert Thieves (2011)
- Diamonds (2011)
- Problems (2014)
