= The Opposite Is Also True =

The Opposite is Also True

Studio album by Snailhouse
- Released: 2001
- Recorded: 2000–2001
- Genre: Indie rock
- Length: 64:05
- Label: Snailhouse Institute For The Recording Arts
- Producer: Mike Feuerstack and Dave Draves

Snailhouse chronology
A New Tradition (2001)	The Opposite is Also True (2001)	The Silence Show (2005)

Professional ratings
Review scores
Source	Rating
AllMusic	3/5 stars

The Opposite is Also True is an album by the artist Snailhouse. It was released in 2001 on the label The Snailhouse Institute For The Recording Arts, and was distributed by Scratch Records. It was recorded between 2000 and 2001 at Little Bullhorn Productions, in Ottawa. It was mastered at SNB. It is a 2-disc album, with each album having different variations of the same songs.

== Critical reception ==
AllMusic called the album "very highbrow in its pop sensibilities and general college rock aura." Exclaim! wrote that "the greatest testament to Feuerstack's accomplishment here is how rarely the urge strikes to engage in a track by track analysis - each 30-minute album works entirely on its own."

== Track listing ==
=== Disc one ===
1. Twenty One Years – 4:08
2. A Matter Of Time – 2:13
3. Daylight – 4:36
4. Dead Air – 3:18
5. Postcards And Movie Stills – 3:02
6. Everything Is Natural – 5:34
7. Three Nights – 4:09
8. Do You Want To Talk All Night? – 2:33
9. Repetition – 3:01

=== Disc two ===
1. Twenty One Years – 4:22
2. A Matter Of Time – 2:30
3. Daylight – 4:35
4. Dead Air – 3:09
5. Postcards And Movie Stills – 3:31
6. Everything Is Natural – 4:10
7. Three Nights – 4:36
8. Do You Want To Talk All Night? – 2:33
9. Repetition – 2:05

== Credits ==
Michael Feuerstack: vocals, guitar, percussion, drums on #11. Julie Doiron: vocals. Dave Draves: piano, organ, vocals, percussion, bass on #11. Jeremy Gara: drums. Samir Khan: bass. Josh Latour: samples, beats, sounds. Doug Tielli: cello, trombone, vocals. All songs written by Michael Feuerstack and arranged in collaboration with the musicians who performed them. Design by Mike Feuerstack and Rolf Klausener. Layout by Rolf. Lake Photo by: Jeremy and others by Mike. Printed at KENMAC Print." "All of this music was recorded in Ottawa at Little Bullhorn Productions by Dave Draves between August 2000 and January 2001, with the exception of tracks #6 and #10, much of which were recorded by Josh Latour at his studio. Mastered at SNB by Jean-Francois Chicoine.
