= Dog City (Matt Mays album) =

Studio album by Matt Mays
- Released: September 25, 2020
- Genre: Rock
- Length: 35:02
- Label: Sonic

Matt Mays chronology
Twice Upon a Hell of a Time (2018)	Dog City (2020)	From Burnside with Love (2021)

Dog City is the eighth studio album by Matt Mays, released September 25, 2020 on Sonic Records. Recorded as an impromptu project during the early 2020 lockdown associated with the COVID-19 pandemic in Canada, it is a concept album written from the perspective of a rescue dog.

Oliver Crook of Exclaim! rated the album 7 out of 10, writing that the album had a corny-sounding concept but is "too self-aware and heartwarming to make you cringe."

== Track listing ==
All songs written by Matt Mays, except "I Wanna Be Your Dog" by Dave Alexander, Ron Asheton, Scott Asheton and Iggy Pop.

No.	Title	Length
1.	"Prelude & Dugue"	0:36
2.	"Dan 'n Shaniqua"	3:28
3.	"Dog City (A Doogie Boogie)"	2:48
4.	"Moondog Matinee"	3:30
5.	"Charlie Andrews"	3:25
6.	"Ur Not Alone"	3:53
7.	"Number Canine"	0:31
8.	"Talking to the Sky"	6:11
9.	"Leggy Peggy"	1:43
10.	"The Public Gardens"	2:00
11.	"Bambina Clementina!"	1:31
12.	"New Tricks"	3:09
13.	"I Wanna Be Your Dog"	2:10
Total length:		35:02
