= The Stanfields =

Canadian rock band

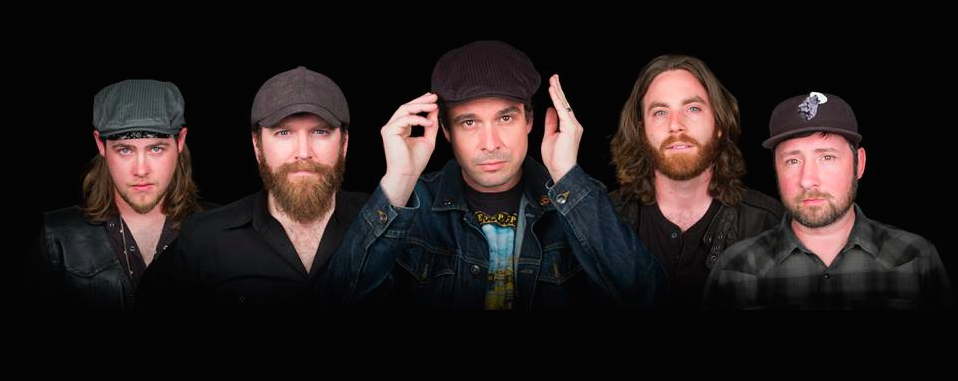
- The Stanfields in 2015. L–R: Dillan Tate, Jason MacIsaac, Jon Landry, Calen Kinney, Mark Murphy

Background information
- Origin: Halifax, Nova Scotia, Canada
- Genres: Folk rock; punk rock
- Years active: 2008–present
- Labels: Groundswell Music/Warner Music Canada; Rookie Records (EU)
- Members: Jon Landry; Dillan Tate; Jason MacIsaac; Calen Kinney; Mark Murphy
- Past members: Craig Eugene Harris; Jason Wright; Charlie Coolen; Jenny Wright
- Website: thestanfields.ca

The Stanfields are a Canadian rock band based in Halifax, Nova Scotia. Described by some sources as "the bastard children of AC/DC and Stan Rogers", the band blends a hard rock style with elements of traditional Atlantic Canadian folk music. The Stanfields are known for their powerful live show, and they have toured mostly in Canada and Germany.

== History ==
Formed in 2008, the band consists of lead vocalist and guitarist Jon Landry, bassist Dillan Tate, guitarist Jason MacIsaac, bouzouki/fiddle player Calen Kinney, and drummer Mark Murphy.

The band formed and started out by playing Rock, Folk, and Country music cover songs during open mic performances at the Seahorse Tavern in Halifax, Nova Scotia. They quickly gained local notoriety for their rowdy, entertaining live performances and were signed to Halifax independent label Groundswell Music in February 2010. In 2012, the band signed a distribution deal with Cologne-based punk rock label, Rookie Records.

The Stanfields released their debut album Vanguard of the Young & Reckless in 2010, and followed up with Death & Taxes in 2012. A third album, For King and Country was released on October 15, 2013. The album contained 10 new songs written, performed and recorded completely acoustically.

The band's fourth full-length record, Modem Operandi, was released on September 18, 2015. A fifth album, Limboland, was released on March 23, 2018.

In early April 2020, during the COVID-19 pandemic, Nova Scotia premier Stephen McNeil made a speech in which he instructed Nova Scotians to "stay the blazes home" to protect the public from the spread of the virus. The Stanfields helped popularize the message by releasing a new song called "Stay the Blazes Home".

== Band members ==
Current

- Jon Landry – vocals, guitar
- Dillan Tate – bass
- Calen Kinney – bouzouki, fiddle, vocals
- Jason MacIsaac – guitar, vocals
- Mark Murphy – drums

Past

- Craig Eugene Harris – bass, mandolin, vocals (2015–2015)
- Jason Wright – bouzouki, vocals (2015–2015)
- Charlie Coolen – guitar (2008–2008)
- Jenny Wright – guitar (2008–2008)

== Discography ==
=== Studio albums ===
- Vanguard of the Young & Reckless (2010)
- Death & Taxes (2012)
- For King and Country (2013)
- Modem Operandi (2015)
- Limboland (2018)

=== EPs ===
- Classic Fadeout (2020)

== Awards ==
- 2013 East Coast Music Awards – Group Recording of the Year for Death & Taxes and the Fan's Choice Entertainer of the Year.
- 2013 Music Nova Scotia Awards – Group Recording of the Year for Death & Taxes and the Fan's Choice Entertainer of the Year.
- 2014 Music Nova Scotia Awards – Folk Recording of the Year for For King and Country
