= Twice Upon a Hell of a Time =

Studio album by Matt Mays
- Released: October 19, 2018
- Genre: Rock
- Length: 53:41
- Label: Sonic

Matt Mays chronology
Once Upon a Hell of a Time (2017)	Twice Upon a Hell of a Time (2018)	Dog City (2020)

Twice Upon a Hell of a Time is the seventh studio album by Matt Mays, released on October 19, 2018. It comprises acoustic rerecordings of the songs from his 2017 album Once Upon a Hell of a Time.

== Track listing ==
All songs written by Matt Mays, except as noted.

No.	Title	Length
1.	"Trust Life"	4:56
2.	"Sentimental Sins"	4:38
3.	"Faint of Heart"	3:38
4.	"Drive On"	3:52
5.	"Howl at the Night"	4:17
6.	"NYC Girls"	3:33
7.	"Dark Promises"	3:15
8.	"Perfectly Wasted"	4:05
9.	"Drunken Angels"	5:51
10.	"Ola Volo"	3:36
11.	"78s, 33s & 45s"	3:10
12.	"Station Out of Range"	5:07
13.	"Never Say Never"	3:43
Total length:		53:41
