= Once Upon a Hell of a Time =

Studio album by Matt Mays
- Released: October 20, 2017
- Genre: Rock
- Length: 52:01
- Label: Sonic

Matt Mays chronology
Coyote (2012)	Once Upon a Hell of a Time (2017)	Twice Upon a Hell of a Time (2018)

Once Upon a Hell of a Time is the sixth studio album by Matt Mays, released on October 20, 2017. His first studio album since 2012, the album was inspired in part by the death of his bandmate Jay Smith in 2013 during the tour to support Coyote.

The album's cover art was designed by artist Ola Volo, who is herself the subject of a song on the album.

In 2018, Mays released Twice Upon a Hell of a Time, an album comprising acoustic renditions of the same songs.

== Track listing ==
All songs written by Matt Mays, except as noted.

No.	Title	Length
1.	"Trust Life"	3:42
2.	"Sentimental Sins"	3:44
3.	"Faint of Heart"	3:12
4.	"Drive On"	4:16
5.	"Howl at the Night"	3:26
6.	"NYC Girls"	3:31
7.	"Dark Promises"	3:58
8.	"Perfectly Wasted"	3:15
9.	"Drunken Angels"	6:01
10.	"Ola Volo"	3:53
11.	"78s, 33s & 45s"	3:30
12.	"Station Out of Range"	5:24
13.	"Never Say Never"	4:09
Total length:		52:01
