= Sa-ba-da-OW! =

Studio album by Gypsophilia
- Released: 2009
- Recorded: November 22, 23 and December 2, 2008, Echo Chamber Audio, Halifax, Nova Scotia
- Length: 54:23
- Label: Independent
- Producer: Gypsophilia

Sa-ba-da-OW! is a jazz album by Canadian band Gypsophilia, recorded in 2008 and released in June 2009.

The album is Gypsophilia's second, and was recorded live off the floor at Echo Chamber Audio recording studio in Halifax, Nova Scotia. It won the 2010 East Coast Music Award for Jazz Recording of the Year.

== Track listing ==
1. "Agricola & Sarah" (R. Burns) – 5:30
2. "Sa-ba-da-OW!" (M. Myer, A. Frith, arr. M. Myer) – 3:26
3. "Jewish Dance Party!" (A. Fine) – 1:55
4. "Hietzing" (R. Burns) – 2:28
5. "A Oha" (S. Oore) - 3:21
6. "Chased" (R. Burns) - 3:33
7. "You Make Time" (N. Wilkinson) - 4:29
8. "Hietzing: The Lightning Round" (R. Burns, M. Myer) - 0:39
9. "Melostinato" (A. Frith) – 3:52
10. "Legs Bounce" (S. Oore) – 2:59
11. "Anything" (R. Burns) – 3:22
12. "Coming Soon" (A. Frith, M. Myer) – 3:22

== Personnel ==
- Nick Wilkinson – guitar, handclaps, vox
- Sageev Oore – piano, Nord Stage keyboard, vox
- Matt Myer – trumpet, claves, slide whistle, vox
- Alec Frith – guitar, claves, vox
- Adam Fine – double bass, electric bass, woodblock, handclaps, vox
- Ross Burns – guitar, pandeiro, triangle, siren whistle, cabasa, vox
- Gina Burgess – violin, vox
