= Cedric Noel =

American musician

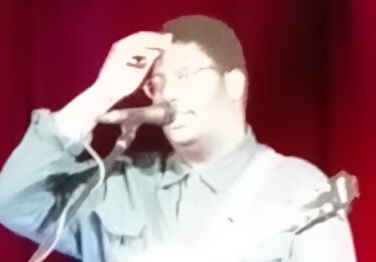
- Cedric Noel at a performance

Background information
- Genres: Indie rock, ambient, pop
- Occupation: Musician
- Instruments: Drums, vocals, guitar, piano, keys, production
- Years active: 2010–present
- Labels: Front Porch Records, Joyful Noise Recordings, Forward Music Group

Cedric Noel is a multinational, multi-instrumental singer-songwriter and musician residing in Canada. His sound has been characterized as ranging from "emotionally driven indie-rock, ambient synth music, and romantic electro-pop" or "gentle folk" but is ultimately intended as a critique of genre limitations that aspires to "contribute to the reimagination of what is understood as ‘Black music’ and help remove the boundaries that term currently encompasses,” as Noel remarked in an interview.

== Biography ==
Adopted Nigerian son of Indian-of-origin Mozambican/Belgian parents, Noel has lived on every continent except Antarctica and his work draws on a wide variety of musical traditions as a result.

Noel attended St. Thomas University in Fredericton, New Brunswick, where he studied journalism. Noel was a contributing writer for St. Thomas's student newspaper The Aquinian from 2010-2013 and his writing often focused on Fredericton's music and arts scenes.

In October 2011, Noel formed Redwood Fields with Fredericton musicians Brendan Magee (keys) and Bruce Duval (drums), and in early 2012 added veteran Fredericton musician Heather Ogilvie to their lineup as a bassist. Redwood Fields released their first full length album Accidentals in July 2013. The album was nominated for Pop Recording of the Year at the 2013 Music NB Awards, while the album's title track was nominated for SOCAN Song of the Year.

Following the dissolution of Redwood Fields in 2014, Noel went on to form a new band, Sentimentals, with fellow St. Thomas University alumnus Will Pacey, and Cam "Terminal" Corey and also began focusing on recording and releasing solo material. After a period of prolific collaboration with local musicians which resulted in a string of releases, Noel was named Grid City Magazine's 2015 Artist of the Year. Noel relocated from Fredericton to Montreal in the fall of 2016.

A long time singer and collaborator with numerous fellow musicians, bands and projects Noel released new solo work in 2020 on the LPs Patterning and Nothing Forever, Everything. In 2021, he joined US record label Joyful Noise Recordings and the Canadian Forward Music Group to release Hang Time which has been greeted as an album of note by Stereogum and others. Liam O'neill of Suuns plays drums on seven of the albums thirteen tracks. "Much of the album deals with questions of friendship and allyship," writes Nikolas Sokai in Exclaim.
