= Michael Feuerstack =

Canadian indie rock musician

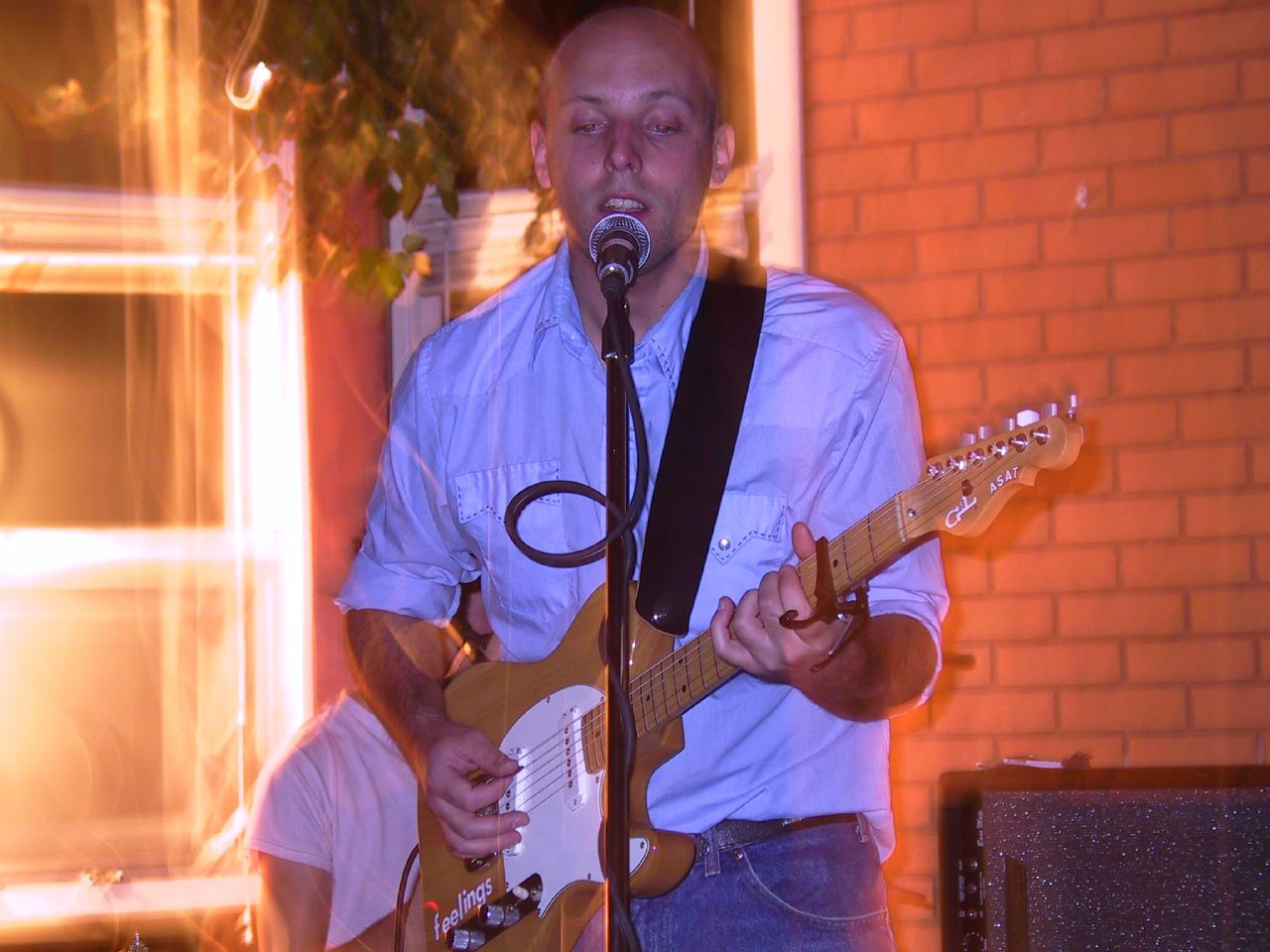
- Michael Feuerstack

Background information
- Also known as: Snailhouse
- Origin: Canada
- Genres: Indie rock; indie pop; lo-fi
- Instruments: Vocals; guitar; lapsteel
- Years active: 1994-present
- Website: Official website

Michael Feuerstack is a Canadian indie rock musician, who has been associated with the bands Wooden Stars and Snailhouse.

Snailhouse was essentially a solo project with multiple contributing artists, including Julie Doiron of Eric's Trip, with production work by Jeremy Gara of The Arcade Fire. Records from Snailhouse have been released on White Whale Records, Forward Music in Canada, Lunamoth, Rhythm of Sickness, Grand Theft Autumn, Unfamiliar Records and Scratch Recordings labels.

In 2012, Feuerstack announced that he was retiring the Snailhouse name, and would be releasing future music under his own name. His first album as Michael Feuerstack, Tambourine Death Bed, was officially released on May 7, 2013. He followed up in 2014 with Singer Songer, an album which featured his songs being performed by other vocalists, including John K. Samson, Angela Desveaux, Jim Bryson, Bry Webb, Little Scream and Devon Sproule.

He released the album The Forgettable Truth in 2015, and followed up with Natural Weather in 2018.

== Discography ==
=== as Snailhouse ===
- Fine (1994)
- The Radio Dances (1998)
- Fine (Re-released 1999)
- A New Tradition (2001)
- The Opposite Is Also True (2001)
- The Silence Show (2005)
- Lies on the Prize (2008)
- Monumental Moments (2010)
- Sentimental Gentleman (2011)

=== as Michael Feuerstack ===
- Tambourine Death Bed (2013)
- Singer Songer (2014)
- The Forgettable Truth (2015)
- Natural Weather (2018)
- Harmonize the Moon (2021)
- Translations (2022)
- Eternity Mongers (2024)

=== Compilations ===
- Friends in Bellwoods II (2009): "Don't Go Anywhere"
