= Grand Theft Bus =

Canadian band

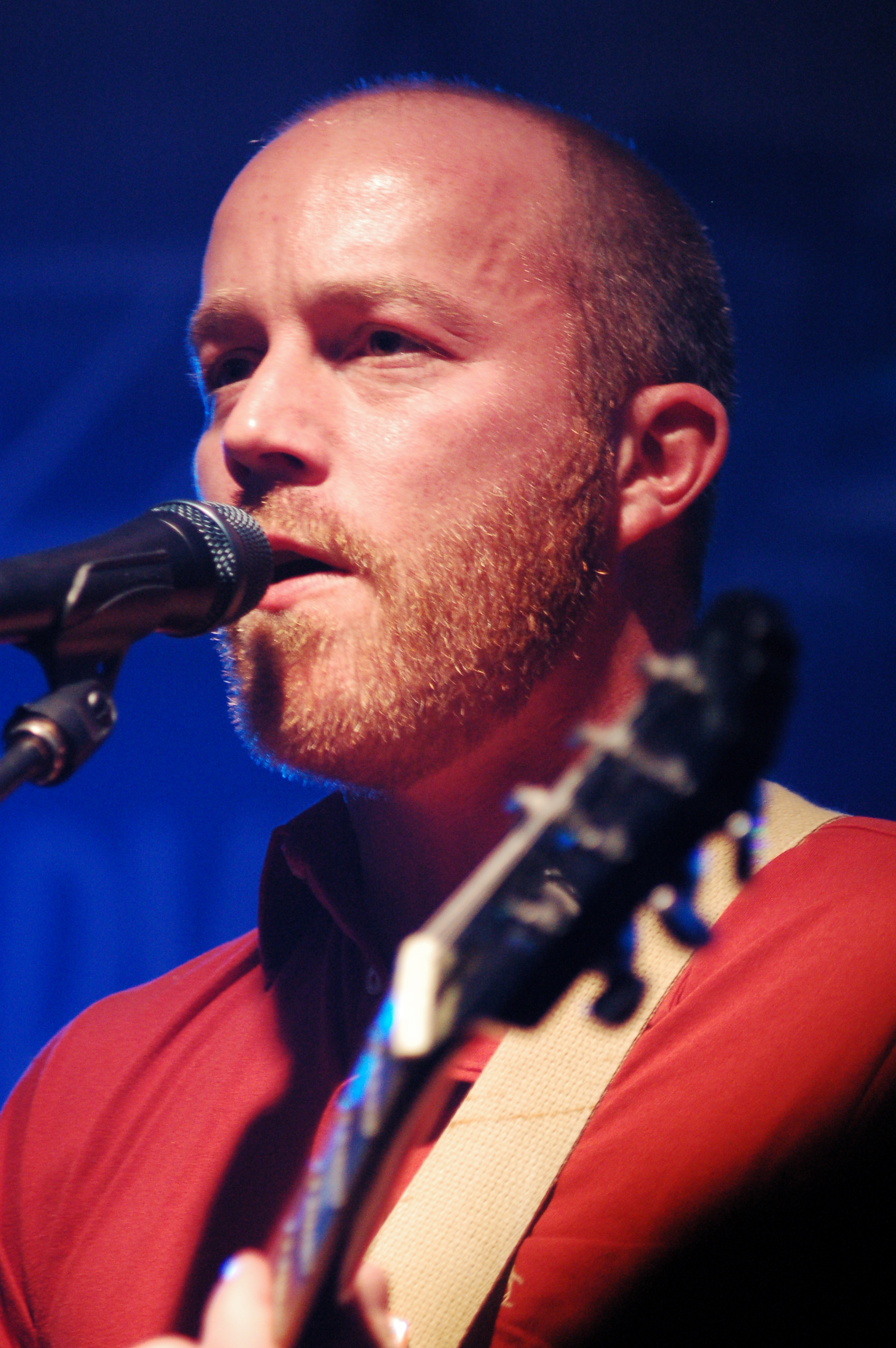
- Grand Theft Bus at the Harvest Jazz and Blues Festival in September '08

Background information
- Also known as: The Development
- Origin: Fredericton, New Brunswick, Canada
- Genres: Indie rock
- Years active: 2000–present
- Label: Forward Music Group
- Members: Tim Walker; Graeme Walker; Dennis Goodwin; Bob Deveau; Brad Perry
- Website: www.grandtheftbus.com

Grand Theft Bus is a Canadian band based in Fredericton, New Brunswick, Canada. The group is known for incorporating multiple genres into their music and for performing extended improvisational sections during live shows.

== History ==
Formed in 2000, the band consists of Tim Walker (guitar, vocals), Graeme Walker (bass, vocals), Dennis Goodwin (guitar, synths, vocals), and Bob Deveau (drums and electronics). Their first album, Birth of Confusion, was released in 2003.

Grand Theft Bus are a sonically dynamic group with an eclectic blend of songs ranging from pop to prog, heavy and intense to light and fluffy, quirky nonsense to meaningful melodrama.

The band regularly plays New Brunswick's Evolve Festival, as well as the Harvest Jazz and Blues Festival.

A mockumentary about the band, Rubarbicon, was filmed by independent filmmaker Greg Hemmings and released in 2006.

The band recorded its 2008 album, Made Upwards, in the main dining room of New Brunswick's lieutenant-governor's mansion.

The band has received the Newcap Radio Alternative Recording of the Year for their album Made Upwards.

Synth player Brad Perry joined the band in 2010. Their album Distracted Tracks appeared on the !earshot National Top 50 Chart in December 2015.

== Discography ==
- Birth of Confusion (2003)
- Flies in the No Fly (2005)
- Made Upwards (2008)
- Say It With Me (2012)
- Distracted Tracks (EP – 2015)
- Are We Still Playing? (2019)

== See also ==
- Music of Canada
- Music of New Brunswick
- Canadian rock
- List of Canadian musicians
- List of bands from Canada
- Category:Canadian musical groups
