= Drew Lightfoot =

Canadian animator and director

- Born: Andrew Lightfoot; August 22, 1978 (age 47); British Columbia, Canada
- Website: http://www.drewlightfoot.com/

Drew Lightfoot is a Canadian director working in film, TV, commercials and music videos. He has also worked as an animator, and continues to use animation as a director, sometimes using stop-motion and CGI in his commercials and videos.

== Film ==
In 2016, Lightfoot directed Horizon, a 9K 22 minute 360 degree film for domes and VR celebrating 150 years of Canadian Confederation. Horizon filmed in every province and Territory in Canada capturing the spirit of Canada in unexpected places around the country.

== TV ==
In 2020 Lightfoot joined the American Gods Season 3 crew as second unit director.

== Commercials ==
Lightfoot first directed commercials while working with Toronto-based HeadGear Animation in 2001. In 2006, he signed with Soft Citizen for commercial representation and with Furlined in the USA in 2008. His career is now focused on live-action work.[3]

He co-founded Someplace Nice in 2013. Lightfoot has directed commercials for clients including Ikea, Apple, Toyota, Bud Light, M&Ms, VW, GM, Sony, and Target.

== Music videos ==
Lightfoot directed music videos through Revolver Film Company for over a decade starting in 2006. His music video works include those for k-os, Kate Havnevik, The Raconteurs, Matt Mays and El Torpedo, Constantines, Guster, In-Flight Safety, The Trews, Moufette, and The Cure.

== Animator ==
Lightfoot has animated a variety of works, including many commercials with HeadGear Animation, Passion Pictures, Blink UK, as well as on several TV shows, including The PJs, and feature film Tim Burton's Corpse Bride and Frankenweenie. He has also worked as Animation Director on several high-profile commercials, including Sony Bravia "Play-Doh", Big Yellow "Tide" and "Frankenweenie" 2012.

=== Awards and festivals ===
In 2008, Lightfoot's video for Kate Havnevik's "Unlike Me" won Best Direction in the Adult Contemporary genre at the MVPA Awards in Los Angeles.

Drew Lightfoot's animated/Super-8 video for Constantines "Working Full Time" won the Special Jury Award at the SXSW Film Festival in 2007, after screening at the festival.

He won an MVPA Award in 2007 for Best Animated Video for Guster's "One Man Wrecking Machine", which received 2 additional MVPA nominations: Directorial Debut, and Best Video Produced for Under $25,000.

Lightfoot was nominated for a 2007 Juno Award in the Video of the Year category, for directing In-Flight Safety's "Coast Is Clear" video. He also received three MMVA nominations in 2007: his video for In-Flight Safety's "Coast is Clear" received two, in the categories of Best Post-Production and Best Independent Video, and his video for k-os' "Sunday Morning" was nominated as Best Pop Video.

He had two videos in ResFest's CanCon 2006: "One Man Wrecking Machine" for Guster and "Working Full Time" for Constantines.

The Los Angeles Film Festival's Music Video programs will feature three of Lightfoot's music videos: Guster's 'One Man Wrecking Machine', k-os's 'Sunday Morning', and Constantines 'Working Full Time'.
