= Coyote (Matt Mays album) =

Studio album by Matt Mays
- Released: September 4, 2012
- Genre: Rock
- Length: 49:22
- Label: Sonic

Matt Mays chronology
Terminal Romance (2009)	Coyote (2012)	Once Upon a Hell of a Time (2017)

Coyote is the fifth album by Matt Mays, released on September 4,2012. It debuted at #7 on the Canadian Albums Chart. It won the 2014 Juno Award for Rock Album of the Year.

== Track listing ==
All songs written by Matt Mays, except as noted.

No.	Title	Length
1.	"Indio"	4:17
2.	"Airstrike"	1:06
3.	"Ain't That the Truth"	3:55
4.	"Take It on Faith"	4:26
5.	"Loveless"	5:02
6.	"Dull Knife"	5:33
7.	"Drop the Bombs"	3:04
8.	"Rochambo"	1:45
9.	"Slow Burning Luck"	4:04
10.	"Madre Padre"	1:53
11.	"Zita"	3:47
12.	"Stoned"	3:28
13.	"Queen of Portland Street"	3:35
14.	"Chase the Light"	4:00
Total length:		49:22
