= Gypsophilia =

Canadian gypsy jazz band

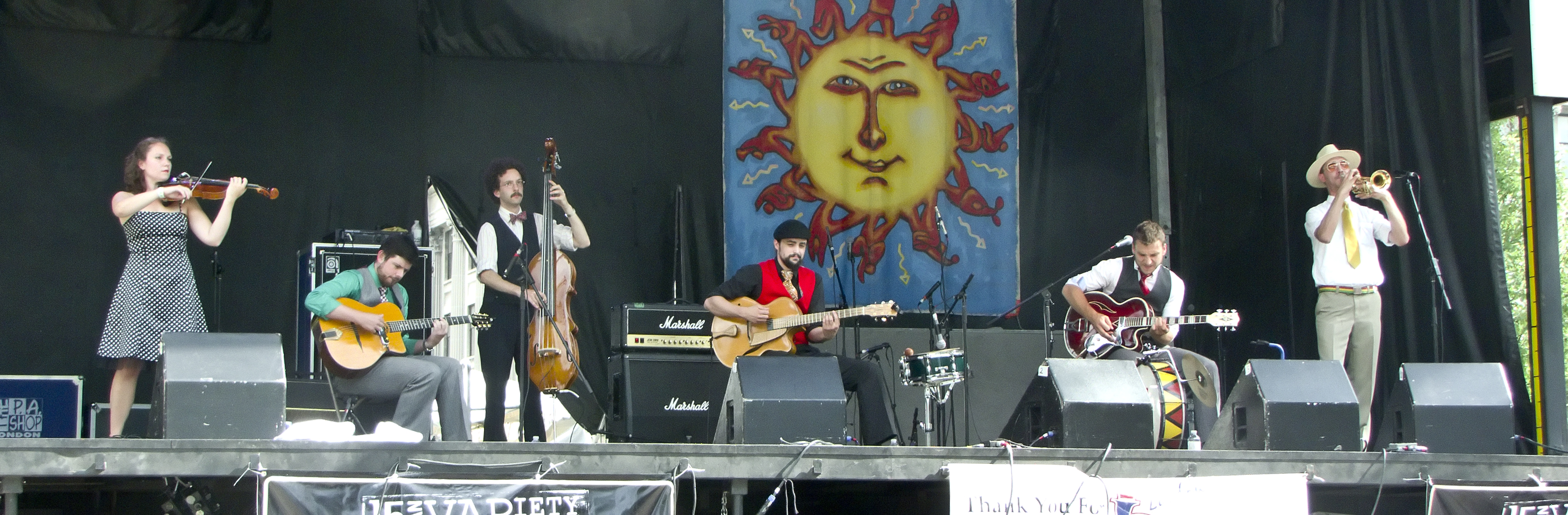

Background information
- Origin: Halifax, Nova Scotia, Canada
- Genres: Jazz
- Years active: 2004–2017
- Label: Forward Music Group
- Members: Ross Burns; Gina Burgess; Alec Frith; Adam Fine; Matt Myer; Sageev Oore; Nick Wilkinson

Gypsophilia was a Canadian jazz band from Nova Scotia. The band is composed of Ross Burns, Alec Frith, Nick Wilkinson (guitars), Gina Burgess (violin), Adam Fine (double bass), Matt Myer (trumpet), and Sageev Oore (piano, keyboards, accordion, melodica). Gypsophilia has released four albums to date, Minor Hope, Sa-ba-da-OW! (2009), Constellation (2011) and Nightswimming (2015) plus a B-sides compilation Horska (2013). On June 9, 2017, the band announced that they would be retiring after 13 years following their summer tour across Canada and a few final farewell performances in Halifax.

== Musical style ==
Gypsophilia was initially inspired by the music of French jazz guitarist Django Reinhardt, but soon found its own distinctive sound through unique original compositions and the melding of the band members' varied backgrounds and influences. While "gypsy jazz" remains a major component of the music, Gypsophilia has incorporated elements of tango, klezmer, funk, classical music, hard bop, and post bop, and its soloists avoid the heavily-clichéd improvisational style found in most contemporary "gypsy jazz". The band's repertoire ranges from energetic swinging dance music to more sophisticated jazz, from highly improvised to through-composed pieces, but often combines these elements, striving to incorporate challenging modern harmonies and melodies in the context of an accessible, swinging beat.

== Debut album ==
Gypsophilia's first CD Minor Hope was released on May 19, 2007. Recorded live over two nights at The Sonic Temple recording studio in Halifax, Nova Scotia, the album's thirteen original compositions demonstrate the range of influences that inform Gypsophilia's sound. For example, the long-form "HIV Jump" (D. Oore) mixes classical music with classic jazz and fusion. "Nicole's Song" (N. Wilkinson) builds from a contemplative ballad through a somewhat baroque bridge to a dynamic suspended climax. "Sebo Psoriatic Psongs" (D. Oore) begins as a dissonant country blues and ends with 1970s Roland Kirk-inspired blues-funk. "Kfeetz kfotz (קפיץ קפוץ)" (D. Oore) is an uptempo klezmer romp. "Vulnerable" (D. Oore) is a fragile and highly-textured triple-metre ballad. "Minor Hope" (D. Oore) builds on the Django Reinhardt standard "Minor Swing" with new melody and harmony, and a solo double bass cadenza.

== Critical and audience response ==
Gypsophilia's music has been enthusiastically received, and most of the band's performances have sold out quickly. In addition to finding a fanbase among jazz listening audiences, Gypsophilia has become popular among the indie scene in Canada, perhaps due to the music's high energy and wild stage antics at their live shows. Minor Hope has also been critically well-received, earning nominations for Nova Scotia Music Awards (Group Recording of the Year, Jazz Recording of the Year) and an East Coast Music Award (Jazz Recording of the Year).

== Awards and nominations ==
- East Coast Music Awards (ECMA)
- 2013 – World Recording of the Year – "Constellation" (won)
- 2013 – Album of the Year 2013 – "Constellation" (produced by Howard Bilerman) (nomination)
- 2013 – Fan's Choice Entertainer of the Year 2013 (nomination)
- 2012 – Jazz Recording of the Year – "Constellation" (won)
- 2011 – Instrumental Recording of the Year – "Sa-ba-da-OW!" (won)
- 2010 – Jazz Recording of the Year – "Sa-ba-da-OW!" (won)
- 2007 – Jazz Recording of the Year – "Minor Hope" (nomination)
- Canadian Folk Music Awards
- 2013 – Instrumental Group of the Year 2013 – "Constellation" (nomination)
- Nova Scotia Music Awards (NSMW)
- 2013 – Best Group Recording (of any genre) – "Constellation" (nomination)
- 2013 – Best Jazz Recording – "Constellation" (won)
- 2010 – Jazz/Electro-acoustic Group of the Year – "Sa-ba-da-OW!" (won)
- 2010 – Album of the Year – "Sa-ba-da-OW!" (nomination)
- 2010 – Group Recording of the Year – Sa-ba-da-OW!" (nomination)
- 2008 – Group Recording of the Year – "Minor Hope" (nomination)
