= Fine (album) =

Studio album by Snailhouse
- Released: 1994
- Genre: Indie rock
- Label: Lunamoth

Snailhouse chronology
Fine (1994)	The Radio Dances (1998)

Professional ratings
Review scores
Source	Rating
Allmusic	4/5 stars

Fine is an album by the artist Snailhouse. It was released in 1994 on the Lunamoth label, and is distributed by Scratch Records.

The album was re-released in 1999 on the label Grand Theft Autumn, with new cover art.

== Track listing ==
1. "Preface"
2. "Keep Frozen"
3. "Clay"
4. "Driftwood And Weeds"
5. "Radio"
6. "17 Years (Teen Smoking)"
7. "Song For Chester Brown"
8. "What Are Your Coordinates?"
9. "Bridges Made For Feet"
10. "Wide Eyed"
11. "Yellow Mean"
12. "Carving Slowly"
13. "April"
14. "Like A Mirror"
