= Chris Kirby =

Canadian singer-songwriter

Chris Kirby is a Canadian singer-songwriter from Newfoundland whose music incorporates jazz, funk, R&B, and pop.

== Career ==
Kirby was a software engineer prior to becoming a musician. He has performed both as a solo act and accompanied by his band, "The Marquee," which features Craig Follett on bass, Mark Marshall on drums, and Chad Murphy on guitar. Kirby has stated that he "loves female singers – that's where I get my influences. I love Aretha Franklin, Mavis Staples, Joss Stone, Norah Jones – those are the kind of people who sing one or two notes and you're hooked. It doesn't matter what you're doing, they've got your attention!"

In 2009, he released Vampire Hotel, an album that won a Music NL Award and was nominated for four East Coast Music Awards.

Kirby has collaborated with Ottawa-based blues harmonica player-singer Steve Marriner on some of his recordings.

== Examples ==
- Wonderizer, the title track from his fourth album
