= Matt Mays =

Canadian musician (born 1979)

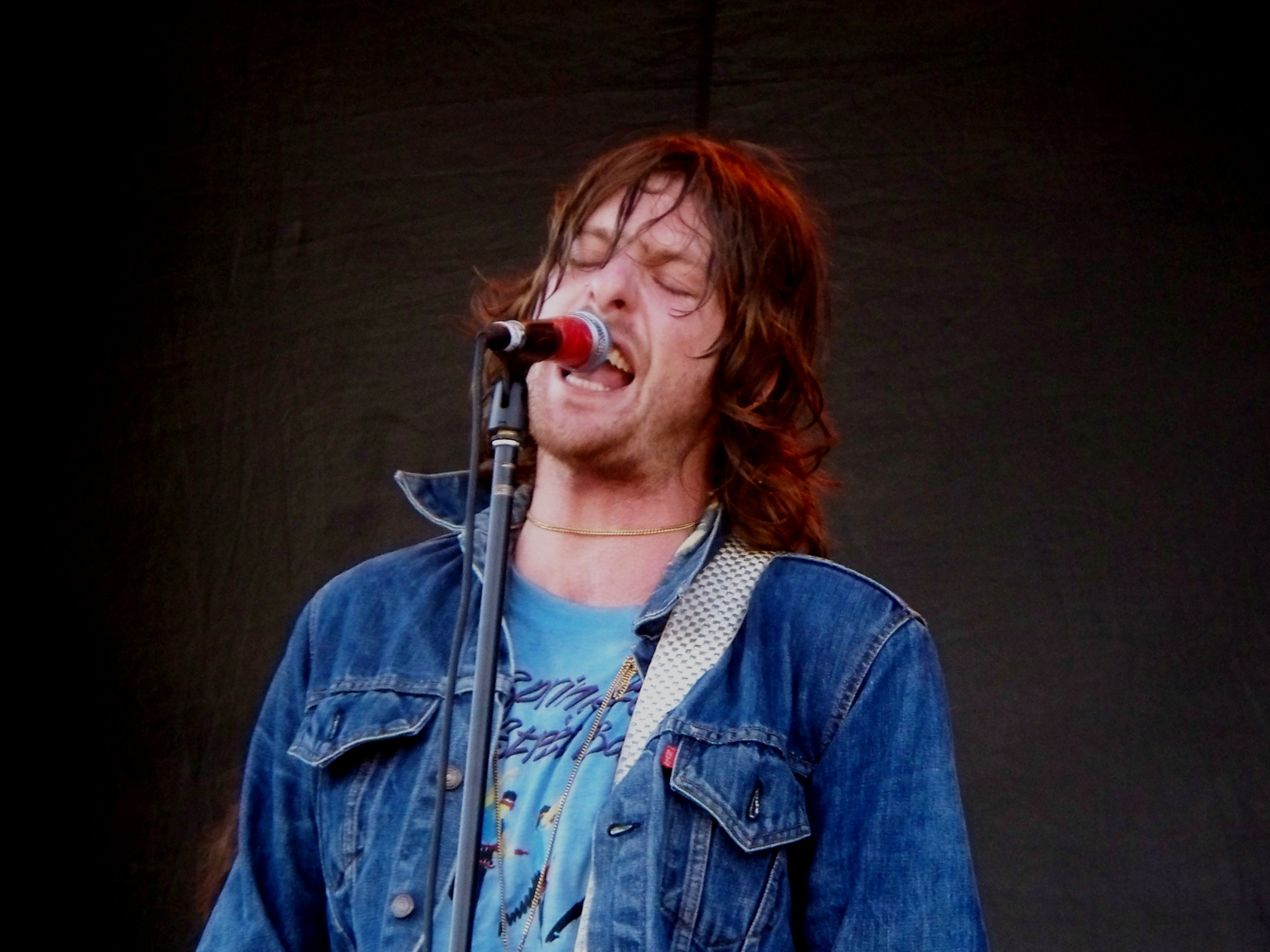

Background information
- Born: August 10, 1979 (age 46); Hamilton, Ontario, Canada
- Origin: Dartmouth, Nova Scotia, Canada
- Genres: Indie rock, folk rock, art rock
- Occupation: Singer-songwriter
- Instruments: Vocals, guitar, harmonica, tenor saxophone, keyboards
- Years active: 1990s–present
- Label: Sonic Records
- Members: Matt Mays; Adam Baldwin; Serge Sampson; Leith Fleming-Smith; Ryan Stanley; Damien Moynihan
- Past members: Jarrett Murphy; Tim Jim Baker; Matt Hammond; Andy Patil; Rob Crowell; Loel Campbell; Jay Smith (d. 2013)
- Website: MattMays.com

Matt Mays (born August 10, 1979) is a Canadian indie rock singer-songwriter and was the lead singer of Matt Mays & El Torpedo, a rock music group based in Dartmouth, Nova Scotia, and New York City. Previously, Mays was a member of a Canadian indie band The Guthries. Mays was born in Hamilton, Ontario, and grew up in Nova Scotia.

== Career ==
=== The Guthries ===
The Guthries were a Canadian country rock band formed in 1998 in Halifax, Nova Scotia, Canada. The band's first album, Off Windmill, was released in 2000. The band toured extensively throughout Canada and the UK. Mays subsequently left the band in 2002, just prior to the release of the band's second release, the self-titled The Guthries. However, following the self-titled release, the band members each began pursuing solo projects, and have not released another Guthries album.

=== Matt Mays ===
At the 2005 Juno Awards, Mays presented an award, and was himself nominated for New Artist of the Year and Adult Alternative Album of the Year for his self-titled album.

In February 2006, Mays appeared with the Symphony Nova Scotia in their Rising Star series on the Dalhousie University campus.

In April 2006, fellow Canadian rocker Sam Roberts released his new album titled Chemical City. Mays performed on the track "Uprising Down Under".

=== Matt Mays & El Torpedo ===
Matt Mays & El Torpedo consisted of Jarrett Murphy (guitar, vocals), Andy Patil (bass, vocals), Tim Baker (drums), Brad Conrad (organ, guitar, pedal steel) and later Jay Smith (guitar, vocals) and Adam Baldwin (keyboard).

The band's self-titled album released in 2005 contained the single "Cocaine Cowgirl", which received saturation airplay on Canadian rock radio in 2005, and its video heavy rotation on MuchMusic. The album also contained the track "The Plan" with backing vocals from fellow Canadian musician Kathleen Edwards.

At the 2006 East Coast Music Awards, MM&ET were nominated for entertainer of the year, group of the year, radio rock recording of the year, album of the year, and single of the year (for "Cocaine Cowgirl"), and won all of these but entertainer of the year award. They closed out the national broadcast of the event with "Cocaine Cowgirl". As he introduced the band, host Mike Smith (Bubbles from Trailer Park Boys) said that they were one of his favourite bands. In Maclean's magazine, Ron MacLean of Hockey Night in Canada listed Matt Mays & El Torpedo among the artists whose music he "never leaves home without."

In 2006, Matt Mays & El Torpedo released a music video for their single "Time of Your Life ('til You're Dead)", directed by Drew Lightfoot. The video was filmed in Kensington Market, Toronto, Ontario. This particular video features the card manipulations of American comedian and magician Erik Tait. This video received notice in the magic world after it was pointed out that the card manipulation with the box is physically impossible. This particular manipulation was achieved by filming Erik's hands then playing the footage backward. The card work is also acclaimed in this video as members of the band perform some of the manipulations.

Matt Mays & El Torpedo performed on Late Night with Conan O'Brien in December 2006.

=== When the Angels Make Contact ===
Matt Mays' project When the Angels Make Contact, released on November 7, 2006, is a soundtrack to Mays' unfinished film of the same name. Regarding the origin of the idea, Mays stated: "I had this album that was based on the theme of an all-nighter. It started when the sun went down and ended when the sun came up. Then I thought, 'That would make a good movie.'" The album flows with the themes of the movie, following the character J.J. Carver, a motorcyclist on a quest. The music video for the title track and the "movie trailer" were both directed by Drew Lightfoot. Although much of the movie was shot in early 2006, production then stalled due to lack of financing. Sam Roberts has a cameo role as an Australian surfer. The album features Buck 65, Skratch Bastid, and Rose Cousins, among others.

=== Terminal Romance ===
The last album, Terminal Romance, was released on July 8, 2008. The singles "Tall Trees" and "Building a Boat" have received heavy airplay on Canadian radio, including CBC Radio 3.

Throughout July 2008, Matt Mays & El Torpedo toured with Kid Rock in support of their new album.

On December 12, 2008, Matt Mays & El Torpedo received 5 East Coast Music Association Nominations including Group Recording of the Year and Songwriter of the Year.

=== Disbanding of El Torpedo ===
Matt Mays & El Torpedo officially disbanded in June 2009 with the departure of Andy Patil and Tim Baker; however, Adam Baldwin and Jay Smith remained with Mays. The band added four new members, including drummer Damien Moynihan, keyboard player Matt Scott, guitar player Matt Hammond, and former The Guthries member Serge Samson. Jay Smith was found dead in his Edmonton hotel room on March 27, 2013.

=== Coyote ===
Matt Mays released the album Coyote in September 2012, and completed a cross-Canada tour to promote the release. The tour concluded on November 17, 2012, in Fredericton, New Brunswick. At the 2014 Juno Awards Coyote received the award for Rock Album of the Year.

== Awards and nominations ==
=== Juno Awards ===
The Juno Awards is a Canadian awards ceremony presented annually by the Canadian Academy of Recording Arts and Sciences.

Year	Nominee / work	Award	Result
2005	Matt Mays	New Artist of the Year	Nominated
2005	Matt Mays	Adult Alternative Album of the Year	Nominated
2007	When the Angels Make Contact	Adult Alternative Album of the Year	Nominated
2009	Terminal Romance	Rock Album of the Year	Nominated
2014	Coyote	Rock Album of the Year	Won

== Discography ==
=== Studio albums ===
Title	Details	Peak chart positions	Certifications
Title	Details	CAN	Certifications
Matt Mays	Release date: 2002; Label: Sonic Records; Formats: CD, vinyl	—	
Matt Mays + El Torpedo	Release date: May 10, 2005; Label: Sonic Records; Formats: CD, vinyl	—	MC: Gold
When the Angels Make Contact	Release date: November 7, 2006; Label: Sonic Records; Formats: CD, vinyl	57	
Terminal Romance	Release date: July 8, 2008; Label: Sonic Records; Formats: CD, vinyl	19	
Coyote	Release date: September 4, 2012; Label: Sonic Records; Formats: CD, vinyl	7	
Once Upon a Hell of a Time	Release date: October 20, 2017; Label: Sonic Records; Formats: CD, vinyl	28	
Twice Upon a Hell of a Time	Release date: October 19, 2018; Label: Sonic Records; Formats: CD, vinyl		
Dog City	Release date: September 25, 2020; Label: Sonic Records; Formats: Vinyl, digital download, streaming		
"—" denotes releases that did not chart

=== Live albums ===
Title	Details	Peak chart positions
Title	Details	CAN
From Burnside With Love	Release date: February 12, 2021; Label: Sonic Records; Formats: Vinyl, digital download, streaming	
"—" denotes releases that did not chart

=== Singles ===
Year	Single	Peak chart positions	Album
Year	Single	CAN Rock	Album
2002	"City of Lakes"	—	Matt Mays
2003	"Downtown"	-	Matt Mays
2003	"Full July Moon"	-	Matt Mays
2004	"Where Am I Going?"	-	Matt Mays
2005	"Cocaine Cowgirl"	4	Matt Mays + El Torpedo
2005	"On the Hood"	22	Matt Mays + El Torpedo
2005	"Time of Your Life"	13	Matt Mays + El Torpedo
2006	"Travellin"	-	Matt Mays + El Torpedo
2006	"When the Angels Make Contact" (featuring Buck 65)	33	When the Angels Make Contact
2006	"850 Commando"	—	When the Angels Make Contact
2007	"Wasn't Meant to Be"	—	Non-album single
2008	"Tall Trees"	—	Terminal Romance
2008	"Building a Boat"	—	Terminal Romance
2009	"Terminal Romance"	—	Terminal Romance
2009	"Rock Ranger Record"	-	Terminal Romance
2010	"Queen of Portland Street"	—	Coyote
2012	"Take It on Faith"	11	Coyote
2013	"Indio"	7	Coyote
2013	"Ain't That the Truth"	—	Coyote
2017	"Faint of Heart"	14	Once Upon a Hell of a Time
2017	"Sentimental Sins"	—	Once Upon a Hell of a Time
2017	"NYC Girls"	25	Once Upon a Hell of a Time
2018	"Perfectly Wasted"	49	Once Upon a Hell of a Time
2019	"Let There Be Love"	44	Non-album single
2020	"Dan n' Shaniqua"	—	Dog City
"—" denotes releases that did not chart
