= Volume One =

Volume One, Volume 1, Volume I or Vol. 1 may refer to:

== Albums ==
- Volume One (The West Coast Pop Art Experimental Band album), 1966
- Volume One (Sleep album)
- Volume One (She & Him album), 2008
- Volume One (Two Steps from Hell album), 2006
- The Honeydrippers: Volume One, 1984
- Vol. I (Dead Combo album)
- Vol. 1 (Birds of Maya album), 2008
- Vol. 1 (EP), by Breed 77
- Vol. 1 (Hurt album), 2006
- Vol. 1 (Nekropolis album), 2003
- Vol. 1 (Radio Company album), 2018
- Vol. 1 (The Tempers album), 2010
- Vol. 1 (We Are The Becoming album), 2008
- Vol. 1 (BROS_album), 2016
- Vol. 1 (Goatsnake album), 1999
- Volume 1 (Reagan Youth album)
- Volume 1 (CKY album)
- Volume I (Queensberry album), 2008
- Volume 1 (Fabrizio De André album), 1967
- Volume 1 (Billy Bragg album), 2006
- Volume 1 (The Besnard Lakes album), 2003
- Volume 1 (BNQT album), 2017
- Volume 1 (Future Boy album)
- Volume 1, a video album by Mushroomhead
- Volume One, the remastered version of The Soft Machine by Soft Machine
- Club Classics Vol. One, by Soul II Soul
- Good Apollo, I'm Burning Star IV, Volume One: From Fear Through the Eyes of Madness, by Coheed and Cambria
- Traveling Wilburys Vol. 1, 1988
- Volume 1, 2014 box set from The Bats
- Volume I, a 2015 EP by September Mourning
- Vol. 1, a 2021 compilation album by The Hellp
- Volume 1: Frozen Ropes and Dying Quails, 2008 album by The Baseball Project
- Volume 1: Instrumental Driving Music for Felons, 1997 EP by The Desert Sessions
- Volume 1: Sound Magic, 1996 album by Afro Celt Sound System
- Volume One: UnIndian Songs, 2005 album by Pedestrian
- Vol. 1: Unreleased, 2002 EP by Jay Dee
- Vol. 1, a 2024 album by Angine de Poitrine

== Other uses ==
- Volume One, the first issue of Volume (magazine), a series of compilation albums published in the UK
- Volume One (magazine), American culture and entertainment magazine
- Volume One (TV series), 1949 American television series

== See also ==
- Volume Zero (disambiguation)
- Volume Two (disambiguation)
- Volume Three (disambiguation)
- Volume Four (disambiguation)
- Volume Five (disambiguation)
- Volume Six (disambiguation)
- Volume Seven (disambiguation)
- Volume Eight (disambiguation)
- Volume Nine (disambiguation)
- Volume Ten (disambiguation)
