= Volume Six =

Volume Six or Volume VI or Volume 6 may refer to:

- Hangover Music Vol. VI
- Radio 1's Live Lounge – Volume 6
- Volume 6: Black Anvil Ego
- Warts and All: Volume 6
- Anjunabeats Volume Six
- Volume 6 (Banda Calypso album), 2004

== See also ==
- Volume Zero (disambiguation)
- Volume One (disambiguation)
- Volume Two (disambiguation)
- Volume Three (disambiguation)
- Volume Four (disambiguation)
- Volume Five (disambiguation)
- Volume Seven (disambiguation)
- Volume Eight (disambiguation)
- Volume Nine (disambiguation)
- Volume Ten (disambiguation)
