= Volume Zero =

Volume Zero or Volume 0 may mean:

- Volume 0, a DVD volume of The Fuccons
- Volume 0: City of Thamesis, part of City of Thamesis
- Genesis 0:0, the volume zero videocassette of Neon Genesis Evangelion
- Slaloms (Lapinot), or Volume 0: Slaloms of The spiffy adventures of McConey
- Sugar Mountain - Live At Canterbury House 1968, or Volume 00 — Sugar Mountain - Live At Canterbury House 1968
- Volume 0: Aiolos, a manga episode

== See also ==
- Volume One (disambiguation)
- Volume Two (disambiguation)
- Volume Three (disambiguation)
- Volume Four (disambiguation)
- Volume Five (disambiguation)
- Volume Six (disambiguation)
- Volume Seven (disambiguation)
- Volume Eight (disambiguation)
- Volume Nine (disambiguation)
