= Volume (disambiguation) =

Volume is the quantity of space an object occupies in a 3D space.

Volume may also refer to:

== Physics ==
- Volume (thermodynamics)

== Computing ==
- Volume (computing), a data storage area accessible via a distinct filesystem, typically resident on a single partition of a storage medium
- Volume (video game), a 2015 video game by Mike Bithell
- Volumetric datasets (3D discretely sampled data, typically a 3D scalar field), which can be visualized with:
  - Volume rendering
  - Volume mesh
  - Isosurface
- Volumetric lighting, or "God rays", sun beams/rays, etc.
- Volumetric path tracing, a method for rendering (different from volume rendering) images in computer graphics
- The Volume, the soundstage in the StageCraft on-set virtual production visual effects technology

== Publishing ==
- Volume (bibliography), a physical book; the term is typically used to identify a single book that is part of a larger collection, but may also refer to a codex
- Volume (magazine), a 1990s UK music magazine
- Volume Magazine, a quarterly architecture magazine
- Volume! The French Journal of Popular Music Studies, an academic journal

== Music ==
- Volume may refer to a sound level assessment, such as:
  - Amplitude
  - Loudness
  - Dynamics (music)
- The Volumes, a 1960s American musical group
- Volumes (band), an American progressive metalcore band
- Volume (album), 2015 album by Skindred

== Other uses ==
- Volume (finance), the number of shares or contracts traded in a security or an entire market during a given period of time
- Volume (film), a 2012 short film directed by Mahalia Belo
- Volume (festival), Australian annual performing arts festival

== See also ==
- "Twenty volumes", a non-scientific description of the concentration of a solution of hydrogen peroxide
- Volume form, used in mathematics
- Volume One (disambiguation)
- Volume Two (disambiguation)
