= Volume Four =

Volume Four, Volume 4, or Volume IV may refer to:

== Music ==
- Lucio Battisti Vol. 4, Lucio Battisti's fourth album, released in 1971
- Vol. 4 (Black Sabbath album), Black Sabbath's fourth studio album, released in 1972
- Volume Four, a 1992 album published by Volume magazine
- Volume 4 (Joe Jackson album), a Joe Jackson album released in 2003
- Volume 4 (Banda Calypso album), a released in 2003
- Vol. 4, an album by Lullacry released in 2005
- Volume IV: The Lions of Love, a 2007 album by Two-Minute Miracles
- All Hope is Gone (Slipknot album), Slipknot's fourth studio album, commonly referred to as 'Vol. 4' before its release in 2008
- Volume 4: Songs in the Key of Love & Hate, Puddle of Mudd's fourth album, 2009
- Vol. 4: Slaves of Fear, a 2019 album by Health
- Volume IV (September Mourning album), an upcoming album by heavy metal band September Mourning
- Volume IV The Classic Singles 88–93, a 1993 compilation album by Soul II Soul
- Vol. IV (Cartel de Santa album), Cartel de Santa's fourth studio album, released in 2008
- Volume 4: Hard Walls and Little Trips, 1998 EP by The Desert Sessions
- Vol. 4: The Redemption, 2005 compilation album
