= Lawnya Vawnya =

Music festival

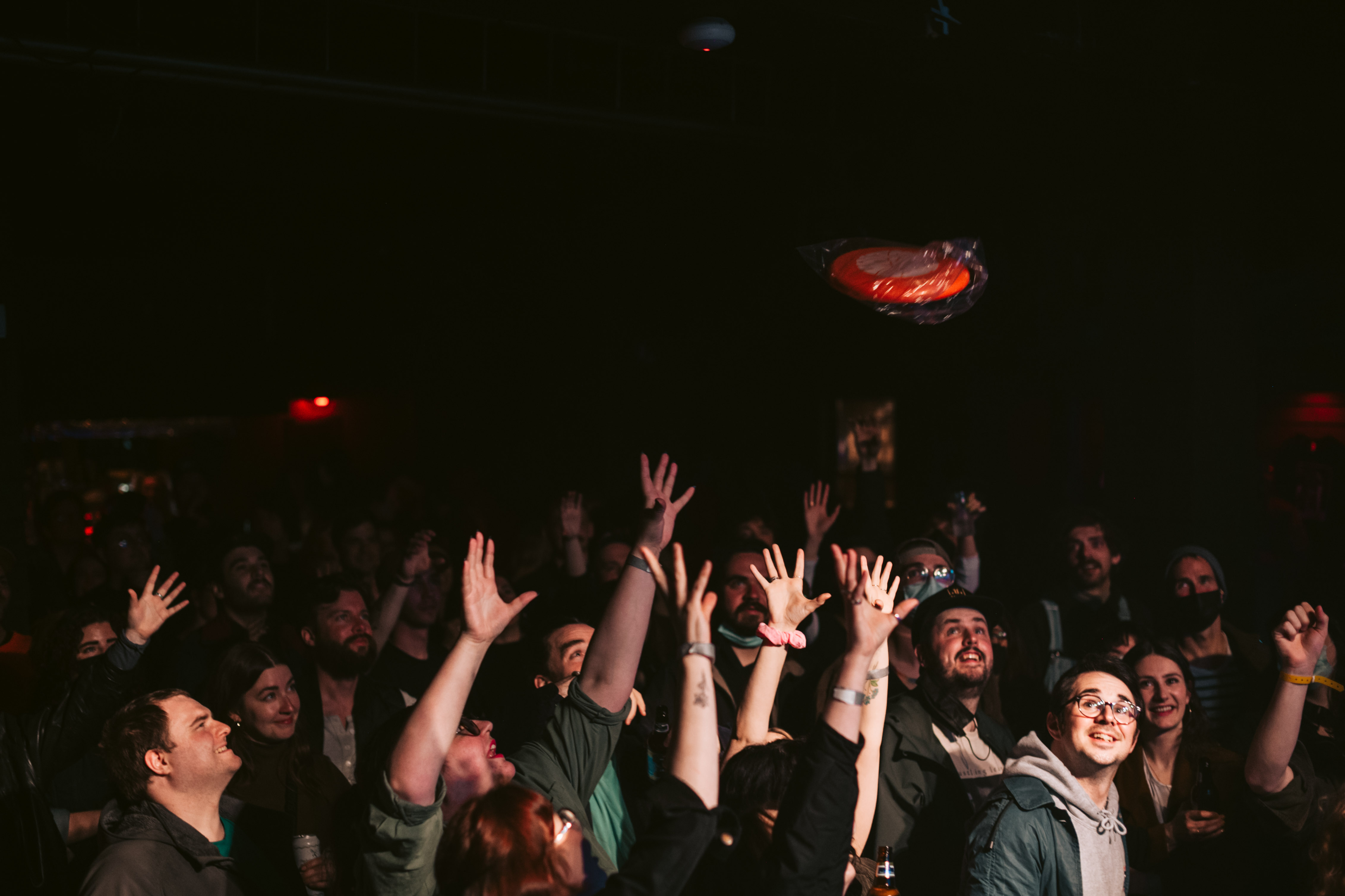
Photo by Rebecca Pardy

Lawnya Vawnya is a non-profit arts organization that presents multidisciplinary and collaborative artistic experiences focused on new independent music in Newfoundland and Labrador, Canada incorporated in 2010. They launched their multi-day festival of music and art in spring 2011 in downtown St. John's. Lawnya Vawnya strives to showcase a vibrant music and arts community and to help further position Newfoundland and Labrador on a national and international cultural map.

Lawnya Vawnya gets its name from an old Newfoundland expression meaning “To have a good time at a dance or a party with plenty to eat”. It is a good time by the sea.

== Performers ==
=== 2011 ===
Lawnya Vawnya 1 was April 20th - April 24th, 2011.

Baby Eagle, Katie Baggs, Dave Bidini, Mark Bragg, Colleen Collins, Construction and Destruction, Tony Dekker (Great Lake Swimmers), The Domestics, Randy Drover, Michael Duguay, Craig Francis Power, Huron, Juicer, Kill Popoff, The Kindness Killers, Kite Hill, Marion MacLeod, Dan Mangan, METZ, Monsterbator, George Murray, The Newish Klezmer Ensemble, Jake and Billy Nicoll, Phoebe Kreutz, Pilot to Bombardier, Pre-Raphaelites, Repartee, Say Fire, Rae Spoon, Jesse Stewart, The Subtitles, Michael Waterman, Leslie Vryenhoek

=== 2012 ===
Lawnya Vawnya 2 was April 18th - 22nd, 2012.

Cadence Weapon, Julie Doiron, Sheezer, Inbreds, Snailhouse, Laura Barrett, Wax Mannequin, Stanley Brinks, B.A. Johnston, Richard Laviolette, The Weather Station, Rouge, Toledo, Freschard, The Olympic Symphonium, Marine Dreams, Animal Faces, Colonel Craze & The Hunch, East of Empire, All The Wiles, Steve Maloney, Veneers, Andrew James O'Brien, Cafeteria, Texmestics, Woolly Leaves, Leatherback, Joanna Barker, The Corroborators, City On The Coast, Das F-ing Tops, The Goodbyes, Hear/Say, Local Tough, Sherry Ryan, Other People, Elling Lien

=== 2013 ===
Lawnya Vawnya 3 was April 17th - 21st, 2013.

Leslie Amminson & Esmee Gilbert, Bloodshot Bill, Lisa Bozikovic, Mark Bragg & The Butchers, Cousins, Delusion Victims, Derm Kean & An Incredible Woman, Fiver, George Nervous Four, The Highest Order, Matthew Hornell, Kid Koala, Jared Klok, Knoahknoah, Jeffery Lewis, Long Distance Runners, Kat McLevey, The Modern Grass, The Mouthbreathers, Ilia Nicoll, Obits, Paper Beats Scissors, Pathological Lovers, Pervert Week, Shotgun Jimmie, Slim Twig, Thom & The Tomcats, U.S Girls, Waterman & Milley, Bry Webb, Wreckless Eric & Amy Rigby, Yellowteeth

=== 2014 ===
Lawnya Vawnya 4 was April 24th - 27th, 2014.

Banded Stilts, Best Friends, The Burning Hell, By Divine Right, The Connexions, Coach Longlegs, Diana, Famines, Fog Lake, GALA, Green & Gold, Jon Hynes, José Contreras, Kappa Chow, Kelly McMichael & The Gloss, The Lurks, Matthew J Thomson, Max Marshall, Monomyth, Monsterbator, Mr Supper, Nick Ferrior & His Feelings, Nick Ryan, Omhouse, Pet Vet, Peter Lannon, Rube & Rake, Snowblink, Sonny Tripp, Soupcans, Steve Maloney & The Wandering Kind, Temples

=== 2015 ===
Lawnya Vawnya 5 was April 22nd - 26th, 2015.

AE Bridger, Bangtek, Bleu, Blurr, Boathaus, Burning Hell, CasperTouch, Jonny and the Cowabungas, Dark For Dark, Denver Drake, Donovan Woods, Doug Paisley, Family Video, GEM, Gianna Lauren, Ginger Snaps, Gingy, Hiera, Jon McKiel, Katie Baggs, Kira Sheppard, The Lonely Parade, Lowell, Maans, Mauno, Mooch, Mudflowers, Nick Everett, Ouroboros, Peter Willie Youngtree, Painful Shivers, Potemtole, Quidi Video, Slick Nixon, Slim Macho, Spitula Clark, Suds, Susie Asado, Suuns, Teenanger, The Darts, The Domestics, The Killing, The Strumbellas, Vulva Culture, Walrus, Weaves, Amery Sandford, Craig Francis Power, Eva Crocker, Aley Waterman, Eva Ísleifs, Katrín Inga Jónsdóttir Hjördísardóttir Hirt, Meg Coles, Rakel Mcmahon.

=== 2016 ===
Lawnya Vawnya 6 was May 4th - 8th, 2016.

Braids, Yonatan Gat, Jennifer Castle, Shotgun Jimmie, Partner, Fake Palms, Trailercamp, Charlotte Day Wilson, Derm Kean and An Incredible Woman, catl, Julie Doiron, Blimp Rock, Weird Lines, Psychic Fair, ChessClub, Year of Glad, Heat Vision, Wunderstrands, Pilot To Bombardier, Zachary Lucky, Roundelay, Bridges, Sleepy, Hear/say, Hard Ticket, Lady Brett Ashley, Sinews, Cafeteria, Allie Duff and The Happy Campers, Greville Tapes Music Club Vol. IV - Whoop Szo & Jon McKiel, Branch Rickey, Dope Piece, Mary Dear, Dame Nature, Eastern Owl, Punch Table, Hudson Alexander & Eytan Tobin, (Bedroomer), RITUAL FRAMES, Potemtole, Peter Willie Youngtree & The Blooms, Scott Royle & The Nightshift Nurses, Worker, Denver Drake, Adam Harding, Chad Pelley, Susie Taylor, Robert Chafe, Edward Riche, Bridget Canning, Sharon Bala, Andreae Callanan.

=== 2017 ===
Lawnya Vawnya 7 was May 10th - 13th, 2017.

Wolf Parade, Dilly Dally, Hooded Fang, Richard Laviolette, Jaunt, Chippy Nonstop, Jim Bryson, Phèdre, Helena Deland, Luka, Not You, Jake Nicoll, Klarka Weinwurm, Steve Maloney, India, Property, Charlotte Cornfield, Motherhood, Owen Steel, New You, Catalina Reapers, Renders, Pete Casey & The Vikkies, Dead Beat Poet Society, Chloë Doucet, yee grlz, Rough Hands, Town House, AE Bridger, Big Space, Swellheads, Maans, Ribbon Tied, Bleu, Jenina MacGillivary, Goon, Dormitories, it Could Be Franky, BBQT, Krystle Hayden, Hot Biscuit, AISEO, Long Night with Vish Khanna.

=== 2018 ===
Lawnya Vawnya 8 was May 23rd - 26th, 2018.

Alvvays, Land of Talk, Yamantaka // Sonic Titan, Clairmont the Second, Bernice, Rae Spoon, Booji Boys, Un Blonde, Eamon McGrath, Mark Bragg, Sorrey, Botfly, Atsuko Chiba, Strongboy, Maylee Todd, Lo Siento, Conditioner, Kuroda, Loveland, The Kubasonics, Gramercy Riffs, Kira Sheppard, Family Video, Trouser, Weary, yee grlz, John, Jane Blanchard, Cicerone, Park Day, Rube and Rake, Land of the Lakes, Albert Dalton, Greta Warner, Van Buren Boys, M. Bootyspoon, Bangtek, Krystle Hayden, Vikking, The Renee Sharpe Show, Dan Seligman, Elisabeth de Mariaffi, Joe Bishop, Matt Williams, Mollie Cronin, Sharon Bala, Nadia Kharyati, Reuben Canning Finkle.

=== 2019 ===
Lawnya Vawnya 9 was May 22nd - 25th, 2019.

U.S. Girls, Snotty Nose Rez Kids, Kid Koala, Faith Healer, Bonjay, Camille Delean, Lex Leosis, Badge Époque Ensemble, Lonely Parade, Absolutely Free, Moon King, Bonnie Trash, Protruders, Jon Hynes, Gulfer, Spring Var, Swamps, Tired Wired, Renders, Jenina MacGillivary, Justin Strong, Secret Connection, Swimming, CUERPOS, Pillowcount, Gossamer, Banana Vacuum, Worst Lay, Wiley, Thank, Belle Trackies, Heather Nolan, Paul Moffett, Terry Doyle, The Renee Sharpe Show.

=== 2020 ===
Lawnya Vawnya 10 was September 30th - October 3rd, 2020.

Alpen Glow, Ariel Sharratt & Mathias Kom, Birch Beer, Cartel Madras, Conditioner, Elisapie, Hullo, Isolation Kills, Kat McLevey, Kyle Gryphon, LB Power, Meg Warren, Nico Paulo, Priors, Regina Gently, Selenium, Sooks, Soap Opera, The Burning Hell, The Renee Sharpe Show, Valmy.

=== 2021 ===
Lawnya Vawnya Cyber Spring was May 27th - 29th, 2021.

Ariel Sharratt, Bobbi Jo Hart, Cindy Lee, Despertá, Elling Lien, \garbagefile, The Garrys, Haviah Mighty, Isha Watson, James Goddard, Jenina MacGillivary, King Sway, Renee Sharpe, Salem Creeps.

Lawnya Vawnya 11 was August 25th - 28th, 2021.

Albert Dalton, Atomic Clock, Backxwash, Bus People, Call Back, Catalina Reapers, Century Egg, Cluttered, Cots, CUERPOS, Dark NL Community Darkroom, Despertá, DijahSB, DJ Cleo Leigh, DJ Shub, Fog Lake, Gaze Lake, Ife Alaba, Immali, Irma Gerd, Kelly McMichael, Kim Harris, Lynette Adams, Megan Gail Coles, Michelle Good, Mirror Dice, Pepa Chan, Pillea, Property, Salem Creeps, The Rangers, Wiremouth, Wite Rino, Xaiver Michael Campbell.

=== 2022 ===
Lawnya Vawnya 12 was June 8th - 11th, 2022.

Lido Pimienta, Nap Eyes, BAMBII, Status/Non-Status, Pantayo, Myriam Gendron, Allison Graves, Alpen Glow, Amelia Harris, Andrew Smith, Art Brat Comics, Ash Park, /garbagefile, Bangtek, Barnacle, Celeste Bell, Chad Feehan, Conditioner, Douglas Walbourne-Gough, Emily Jan, Heaven For Real, I Don't Do Comics, Irma Gerd, Jennie Williams, Jing Xia, John Moran, Kat Danylewich, Katie Baggs, Katie Hamill, KERUB, Knitting, Kubasonics, Larinda Mood, Lil Omar, Lily Taylor, Markus Floats, Megan Samms, Mild Manors, Motherhood, Needle Crafts, Nick Schofield, Owen Finn, Paul Sng, Personal Submersible, RITUAL FRAMES, Salome Barker, Sauna, Soap Opera, Sooks, Sunforger, Swimming, Tess Roby, The Phlegm Fatales, Tunnel Vision, Wape'k Muin, Weary.

=== 2023 ===
Lawnya Vawnya 13 was June 7th-10th, 2023.

Cakes Da Killa, Bria, Cecile Believe, Regularfantasy, Bonnie Trash, Buffy Sainte-Marie, Bazooka, Brandon Monkey Fingers, Cedric Noel, Crossed Wires, El Toro, Greta & The Goldfish, Hot Gum, HRT, Mother Tongues, Nico Paulo, Peter Lannon, Sick Puppy, So Violento, SSSLO, Thandi Marie, Vince The Messenger, Wampums, Barbra Bardot, Danielle Devereaux, Daze Jefferies, Desmond Cole, Elijah Janka, Frankie Teardrop, Georgia Webber, Hazel Eckert, Irma Gerd, Jennifer May Newhook, Kate Lahey, Lavender Blonde, Liam Ryan, Madame Daddy, Nadia Duman, Madison Thomas, Newfound Lad, THE FIX ITS, Tia McLennan, Xaiver Michael Campbell, XIA-3.

=== 2024 ===
Lawnya Vawnya 14 was June 5th-8th, 2024.

\garbagefile, Aley Waterman, Aquakultre, Ash Park, Augur's Wand, Blunt Chunks, Bread Clip, Carnage, Corey Clocksy, Craig Francis Power, Crip Rave, Cuerpos, DaMi, DEBBY FRIDAY, Destiny, Doberman, Eva Crocker, Former Eraser, Gallery, Gravy, Groceries, HERE & NOW, HOT 4 THE MOMENT, Hotmail Summer, Indian Giver, Jack Etchegary, Jenina MacGillivray, Kyle Cunjak, Lady Katie, Martyn Bootyspoon, Meg McLaughlin, Megan Samms, Misty, MUMMERS, Myst Milano, m’lk collective, Nadia Duman, Natalie Southworth, Needle Crafts, NL Latin Band, Ribbon Skirt, Stacey Sexton, Taupe, Tunnel Vision, Ura Star & Fireball Kid, Valmy, Waubgeshig Rice, Willie Thrasher & Linda Saddleback.

=== 2025 ===
Lawnya Vawnya 15 was June 4th-7th, 2025.

\garbagefile, Absolute Losers, Albert Dalton, Andrew Smith Band, Andy and The Dannys, Beverly and Elizabeth Glenn-Copeland, Book Club, Bus People, Cartel Madras, Cell Deth, Chelsea McMullan, CLEO LEIGH, Durex, Eda Kumquat, Elizabeth Glenn-Copeland, Elizabeth Perry, Emma Cole, Ever Deadly, FOREIGNERZ, Frankie Teardrop, Fraud Perry, Halfcase, Irma Gerd, IWant2BeOnTV, Jack Etchegary, Janet Cull, Joe Fowler, Julianna Riolino, Laughing, Life Crisis, Liftkit, Lindsey Harrington, Little Fauna, Liz Fagan Band, Mantourage, Madeleine Thien, Marc McLaughlin, Marlaena Moore, Moira Demorest, Nancy Music, Overland, Owen Finn, Paterson Hodgson, Penny & the Pits, Phonoautomat, QUIN, Rad Gushue, Rat & Ratt, Sasha Cay, Snitfit, Steel Toe, Swimming, Tanya Tagaq, Topanga.

=== 2026 ===
The 2026 edition took place from June 3 to 6, 2026.

Performers included AEXEL, Joanna Barker, Cable TV, chump, CPR, Corey Clocksy, Country Cookin', Dear Evangeline, Desperatá, DJ Decision & Aniiiiiiiiiiiiiiiiiita, Èbony, Fairweather, fanclubwallet, Feminotica, Fiver with the fiver trios, G̱a̱mksimoon, Gravy, Cassia Hardy, Matt Horseman, HRT, Invisible Hand, JayWood, Kiwi Jr., Kubasonics, Kate Lahey, LICE, MANTRACKER, Kelly McMichael, Miesha and the Spanks, Narcy, QUIN, Maria Reva, Shunk, Sick Puppy, Slash Need, UZU أوزو, Zaynab Wilson and Jem Woolidge.
