= Fembots (band) =

Canadian indie rock band

FemBots
- Origin: Toronto, Ontario, Canada
- Genre: Indie rock
- Years active: 1998–2010
- Labels: Paper Bag (2003–2008) weewerk
- Members: Dave MacKinnon; Brian Poirier; Nathan Lawr; Iner Souster
- Website: fembots.net (defunct)

FemBots are a Canadian indie rock band from Toronto formed in 1998. FemBots are known for their unique sound of combining instrumental everyday items, junk instruments, and traditional instruments in their music.

== Background ==
The band's core members, Dave MacKinnon and Brian Poirier, were members of the early 1990s alternative rock band Dig Circus alongside Mark Hansen, James Julien and Dave Dreveny. That band released three albums independently, but broke up in the mid-1990s before achieving any mainstream success. They subsequently joined with Ron Hawkins of The Lowest of the Low to form the band Hummer for a one-album project in 1997 before launching Fembots.

== History ==
The Fembots were performing in Toronto by 1998. Their live show included analogue tape loops and prerecorded sound clips.

Fembots' first album, Mucho Cuidado introduced their distinctive style of music with toys and power tools as instruments in their songs.

Small Town Murder Scene, released in 2003, sounded more commercial than their debut, but was also praised by critics. In support of this album, FemBots toured with The Weakerthans and Arcade Fire. The director Malcolm Ingram used five songs from Small Town Murder Scene in his 2006 documentary Small Town Gay Bar.

For The City, their third album recorded in the spring of 2005, Mackinnon and Poirier collaborated with Krista Muir, Lawrence Nichols and drummers Mark Hansen and Nathan Lawr, frontman for the Minotaurs (who would join Fembots for their next album). The City moved the FemBots sound in a new direction, as they used more traditional instruments, while maintaining the distinctive emotion and creativity found in their previous albums. The City signifies their experiences in their hometown, Toronto, the good and the bad–"Demolition Waltz", for example, is about the loss of neighbourhoods. The City was extremely well received by critics.

While making their 2008 album, Calling Out, FemBots contributed two songs to the 2007 film The Tracey Fragments, a soundtrack done by Canadian supergroup Broken Social Scene. The band's music was also the soundtrack for the 2007 Ed Gass-Donnelly film This Beautiful City.

Calling Out signified a big change for the band, as they moved from Paper Bag Records, their record label for their first three studio albums, to weewerk records. The initial idea for the album was to make it using solely junkstruments, aided by the expertise of their new member, Iner Souster. However, junkstruments could not sustain an entire album and they were used as rhythm tracks. Souster and Lawr also contributed to the songwriting process, a first for Mackinnon and Poirier. The album was released on September 16, 2008, and they toured Canada to promote it.

Although never formally breaking up, FemBots became inactive following that album; members spent the next several years as touring session musicians with The Weakerthans. On February 11, 2010, they played a "reunion" show at the Wavelength 500 Festival. (Wavelength Music Arts Projects) Iner Souster joined the band Detroit Time Machine and opened an art gallery in Toronto. Nathan Lawr remains with the Minotaurs.

The Fembots music is used in the 2009 film Jackpot, and is the soundtrack for the true-crime documentary series Farm Crime (2018–2023).

== Members ==
- Brian Poirier – vocals, guitar, bass
- Dave Mackinnon – vocals, guitar, piano
- Iner Souster – junkstruments
- Nathan Lawr – drums

== Discography ==
=== Studio albums ===
- 2000: Mucho Cuidado
- 2003: Small Town Murder Scene
- 2005: The City
- 2008: Calling Out
- 2022: Transfigurations

=== Soundtracks ===
- 2006: Small Town Gay Bar
- 2007: The Tracey Fragments
- 2007: This Beautiful City
- 2009: Jackpot
- 2018–2023: Farm Crime
