= Weewerk =

Canadian folk and roots recording label

Weewerk, stylized as (weewerk), is an independent folk, roots, bluegrass, country record label and artist-management company based in Toronto, Ontario, Canada. It was founded in 2002 as an art-and-music salon series in the apartment of Teenage USA Recordings partner Phil Klygo and artist-curator Germaine Koh. Klygo was Festival Director of Canadian Music Week from 2001 to 2007.

Weewerk has released albums from Great Lake Swimmers, Elliott Brood, United Steel Workers of Montreal, The Barmitzvah Brothers, Barzin, Ox, Two-Minute Miracles, The Burning Hell, Filly & The Flops, Proof of Ghosts, Jenny Omnichord, Don Brownrigg, FemBots, Canteen Knockout, Art Bergmann and The Travelling Band.

The label's name is a play on the name of fellow Canadian record label Nettwerk, and was named for the small apartment space in which the company was founded.

== Discography ==
1. Great Lake Swimmers, Great Lake Swimmers
2. The Barmitzvah Brothers, Mr. Bones' Walk-In Closet
3. Elliott Brood, Tin Type
4. Great Lake Swimmers, Bodies and Minds
5. Barzin, My Life in Rooms
6. United Steel Workers of Montreal, Broken Trucks and Bottles
7. Great Lake Swimmers, Hands in Dirty Ground
8. Ox, American Lo Fi
9. Great Lake Swimmers, Ongiara
10. United Steel Workers of Montreal, Kerosene and Coal
11. The Two-Minute Miracles, Volume 3.5: Rats
12. The Two-Minute Miracles, Volume IV: The Lions of Love
13. The Barmitzvah Brothers, Let's Express Our Motives
14. The Burning Hell, Happy Birthday
15. Harmonica, Miaow, Miaow...BARK!
16. Proof of Ghosts, Proof of Ghosts
17. Jenny Omnichord, Cities of Gifts and Ghosts
18. The Burning Hell, Tick, Tock
19. Don Brownrigg, Wander Songs
20. Canteen Knockout, Navajo Steel
21. The Two-Minute Miracles, Volume I (re-release)
22. The Travelling Band, The Redemption of Mr. Tom
23. Various Artists, (weewerk) is 6!
24. FemBots, Calling Out
25. The Burning Hell/Jenny Omnichord, Split 7"
26. Great Lake Swimmers, Song Sung Blue
27. Jon-Rae Fletcher, Oh, Maria
28. United Steel Workers of Montreal, Three on the Tree
29. The Burning Hell, Baby
30. Great Lake Swimmers/Audiotransparent, Split 7"
31. Ox, Burnout
32. Filly and the Flops, Filly and the Flops
33. Canteen Knockout, Broken Down Town

== Label compilations ==
On October 14, 2008 (weewerk) released (weewerk) is 6!, a compilation to celebrate their sixth anniversary.

== See also ==
- List of record labels
