= This Charmed Life =

Studio album by The Burning Hell
- Released: February 28, 2010
- Recorded: Burnaby, British Columbia
- Genre: Indie, folk
- Language: English
- Producer: Jordy Walker

The Burning Hell chronology
| Baby (2009) | This Charmed Life (2010) |

This Charmed Life was released by The Burning Hell in the spring of 2010. It was available only on LP at the band's live shows or as a digital download.

== Track listing ==
All songs by Mathias Kom

1. Robert's Bad End
2. Don't Let Your Guard Down
3. 70 Mile House
4. Earthquake & Volcano
5. Last Winter
6. 100 Mile House
7. Northern Life
8. The Things That People Make, Part 3
9. 150 Mile House
