= The City (FemBots album) =

Studio album by FemBots
- Released: 2005
- Genre: Indie rock
- Label: Paper Bag Records

FemBots chronology
Small Town Murder Scene (2003)	The City (2005)	Calling Out (2008)

Professional ratings
Review scores
Source	Rating
Allmusic	link

The City is the third album by Canadian indie rock group FemBots, released in 2005 on Paper Bag Records.

Guest musicians on the album include Jason Tait, Greg Smith, Julie Penner, Nathan Lawr, Lawrence Nichols and Krista Muir.

== Track listing ==
1. "So Long"
2. "Count Down Our Days"
3. "Up from the Ditches"
4. "Demolition Waltz"
5. "Demolition Waltz, Part II"
6. "My Life in the Funeral Service"
7. "The City"
8. "Gilded Age"
9. "Hell"
10. "History Remade"
