= Trevor Coleman =

Trevor Coleman is a co-founder of InteraXon, a Canadian company specializing in software for Non-invasive Brain-computer interfaces. The company presented an installation at Ontario House during the Vancouver 2010 Winter Olympic Games that allowed users in Vancouver to control the lights on the CN Tower, Niagara Falls and the Canadian Parliament Buildings. Interaxon also created the world's first thought-controlled in-flight entertainment system, which they demonstrated at the On the Wings of Innovation conference organized by the Ontario Government and Ontario Aerospace Council in Windsor in June 2010.

Before co-founding InteraXon, Trevor Coleman studied Cognitive Science at York University while he worked in the entertainment industry, booking and promoting shows at non-traditional venues, and referred to himself as "King of the Hipsters." Venues he worked with included The Boat, a former Portuguese seafood restaurant that is more commonly used as a music venue, Teranga, a Senegalese restaurant & bar and Baby Dolls, a Toronto strip club.

He was also invited to be a guest booker at Wavelength, a long-running Toronto independent music series and was invited to participate in a panel entitled "Torontopia vs Dystopia" at Wavelength 300, a festival to celebrate the series' anniversary.

In 2010, Trevor Coleman was invited to be a featured speaker at the North by North East Interactive conference, where he gave a talk entitled "Thought Controlled Everything." In 2011 he spoke at the FITC Emerging Technology in Advertising conference, the Canadian Marketing Association's Digital Day and Strategy Online's ATOMIC conference.

In November, 2011 he was vocal in declaring the Project Black Mirror brainwave-to-Siri hack a hoax and his blog post on the subject was cited as an authority by a number of blogs and websites.
