= 13 Songs =

13 Songs may refer to:

- 13 songs, a 2005 album by Julie Feeney
- 13 Songs (Fugazi album), 1989
- 13 Songs, a 2005 album by Tim Scott McConnell

== See also ==
- "Thirteen" (song), by Big Star
- 13 Songs and a Thing, a 2003 album by Bob Drake
- Volume II: Thirteen Songs from the House of Miracles, a 2001 album by The Two-Minute Miracles
