= The Weekend (Canadian band) =

Canadian pop-rock band

- Origin: London, Ontario, Canada
- Genres: Pop-rock, Pop punk
- Years active: 1998–2005
- Members: Andrea Wasse; Link C.; Lorien Jones; Mike Clive

The Weekend was a pop rock band from London, Ontario, Canada.

The Weekend has lent its music to feature film soundtracks (Freaky Friday, Uptown Girls, D.E.B.S.) and television shows such as The Simple Life 2 and So Little Time.

The band name led fellow Canadian singer the Weeknd to spell his name without the last "e", to avoid copyright issues.

== History ==
Co-founders Andrea Wasse (vocals, chief songwriter) and Link C. (synthesizer, programming) were in high school when they formed the band with Lorien Jones (bass), and Mike Clive (drums). Their first performance was in 1998. Originally a swing band who were part of the 1990s swing revival, the band reoriented towards pop and power pop.

Its second performance was as an opening act for an audience of over 500 people. The Weekend quickly gained a loyal audience in the Southwestern Ontario independent music scene.

=== 2000–2005 ===
The Weekend's self-titled debut album was released in 2000 on the label Teenage USA. It was produced by Andy Magoffin of The Two-Minute Miracles. In 2002, the band won the Grand Prize at the New Music West festival in Vancouver. The band issued three albums produced as pop music with themes that revolve around the attainment of 'perfect love'. They travelled worldwide and with popularity in Asia and Australia. In 2004, it toured Indonesia as part of Soundrenaline 2004, the largest rock music festival in the country.

As of 2005, the band included lead singer Andrea Wasse, keyboardist Lincoln Cushman, guitarist Ryan Ford, drummer Jason Pierce, and bassist Randie Van Gorp.

=== Solo work (2004–2010) ===
Andrea Wasse co-wrote for Canadian Idol (2004), CTV Television series Instant Star, and album tracks for artists Jenna G and Amanda Stott.

Wasse co-wrote "Watch Me Move", performed by Fefe Dobson. "I'm a Lady" is another one of the songs Wasse co-wrote. The songs appeared on Dobson's album Joy released in November 2010.

== Discography ==
- The Weekend (2000)
- Teaser EP (2002)
- Teaser + Bonus Level (2003)
- Kiss Kiss (2003) – exclusive to Australia and Japan
- Beatbox My Heartbeat (2005) - includes the single "Into the Morning"
