= People (The Burning Hell album) =

Studio album by The Burning Hell
- Released: April 16, 2013
- Recorded: June 2012 at Studio Line, Berlin
- Genre: Indie Rock
- Label: Headless Owl, (weewerk), BB*Island

The Burning Hell chronology
Flux Capacitor (2011)	People (2013)	Public Library (2016)

People is the sixth full-length album by the Canadian indie rock band The Burning Hell, released in April 2013 in Canada, May 2013 in Europe and April 2014 in the UK. The album was recorded in Berlin by Norman Nitzsche and Ramin Bijan. They followed up the recording with doing 10 shows across Europe within a 24 hour period.

== Track listing ==
All tracks written by Mathias Kom and arranged by The Burning Hell.

1. "Grown Ups"
2. "Holidaymakers"
3. "Amateur Rappers"
4. "Realists"
5. "Sentimentalists"
6. "Barbarians"
7. "Wallflowers"
8. "Travel Writers"
9. "Industrialists"

== Personnel ==
- Mathias Kom - ukulele, guitar, vocals, xylophone
- Darren Browne - guitar
- Nick Ferrio - bass, lap steel, vocals
- Jake Nicoll - drums, keys, vocals
- Ariel Sharratt - clarinet, vocals
- Stanley Brinks - saxophone, vocals
- Clemence Freschard - zafzafa, vocals
