= Baby (The Burning Hell album) =

Studio album by The Burning Hell
- Released: March 17, 2009
- Recorded: House of Miracles, London, Ontario; The Quarantine, Port Greville, Nova Scotia, Jordy Walker, Burnaby, British Columbia
- Genre: Indie, folk
- Label: (Weewerk) (Canada)/Rough Trade (Europe)
- Producer: Andy Magoffin

The Burning Hell chronology
Happy Birthday (2008)	Baby (2009)

Baby is the 2009 release from the Canadian indie band The Burning Hell, released on the Canadian independent record label weewerk in the spring of 2009.

== Track listing ==
All songs by Mathias Kom

1. "Old World"
2. "Dancer/Romancer"
3. "Everybody Needs a Body (To Be Somebody)"
4. "The Things That People Make, Pt. 2"
5. "Mosquito"
6. "Grave Situation, Pt. 3"
7. "Precious Island"
8. "Animal Hides"
9. "The Berlin Conference"
10. "When the World Ends"
11. "Everything Will Probably Be OK" (hidden track)
