= Burnout (Ox album) =

Studio album by Ox
- Released: 2009
- Genre: Alternative country
- Label: Weewerk Saved By Vinyl
- Producers: Chôn, Ox

Ox chronology
American Lo Fi (2006)	Burnout (2009)

Burnout is the third album by Canadian band Ox, released in 2009. The album was released by Weewerk with distribution by Outside Music. It was recorded in Vancouver at The Upstairs Sound Lab/Profile during the Winter season of 2007. The record reached #5 across Canada on the Earshot Radio Chart and #1 on its Folk/Roots chart.

The CD edition includes two video productions by John Alden Milne for the songs "Prom Queen" and "Unknown Legend". Both videos were filmed in Sudbury, Ontario, Canada. "Unknown Legend" featured the interior of what is now Cosmic Dave's Vinyl Emporium, a record store and venue in the Donovan neighbourhood of Sudbury.

== Track listing ==
1. "Burnout"
2. "Prom Queen"
3. "Unknown Legend"
4. "Ojibway Diner"
5. "Your Old Buick"
6. "Speedwagon"
7. "Miss Idaho Redux"
