= The Tempers =

American electronic art rock band

- Origin: Seattle, WA, United States
- Genres: Synthpop, glam rock, art rock, dark cabaret
- Years active: 2006–present
- Members: Corina Bakker; Chalia Bakker; James Bakker
- Website: www.thetempers.net

The Tempers are an American electronic art rock band based in Seattle, WA. The group consists of siblings Corina (vocals), Chalia (drums), and James (synth) Bakker. They play "electronic music that blends the more psychedelic sounds of the early 70's with an experimental electronic sound inspired by artists of the last two decades...Dead Disco, Love wave, Tropical Black Magic–it has yet to be defined by a genre."

== History ==
The Tempers formed in the summer of 2006, when they wrote and put their first song on Myspace, "Scissors." The Tempers continued to release songs, such as "White Walls" and "Fix" via Myspace. "Scissors" and "White Walls" were never released on an album and are no longer available commercially. "Fix" was later rerecorded and released on "Vol. 1 (The Tempers album)".

The Tempers started playing shows in 2009, their first show being at the High Dive in Seattle, WA. On October 31, 2010, they self-released their debut studio album, Vol. 1. They also released a self-directed music video for the track "Alone Again".

For The Tempers second release, they enlisted the help of Kickstarter, a crowdfunding platform. They raised enough money for the production of an EP, "Together We Are The Love Vortex," that they self-released on July 6, 2012. Another self-directed music video for the track "You Must Be Crazy" was released as well.

The Tempers are currently working on new material with Producer Gordon Raphael (The Strokes, Regina Spektor).

In 2021, they released a new EP entitled "Vol. 2"

== Influences ==
On "The Tempers picks", a part of the weeklong series SSG Music did on The Tempers, they selected songs they liked by The Knife, Fever Ray, Roxy Music, Funkadelic, Cee-Lo, Peter Gabriel, and Kate Bush. In another interview done by City Arts Magazine where Corina was asked "What kind of music did you listen to growing up? What about now?", she responded "Marvin Pontiac. Marvin Pontiac." In an interview with Mute Magazine (Argentina) Corina also cites Bryan Ferry, Antony and the Johnsons, Johnny Cash, Nina Simone, Leonard Cohen, Sufjan Stevens, Fever Ray, Towns Van Zandt, Joy Division, Kate Bush, Arthur Brown, and Robert Plant as influences.

== Early life ==
Corina and Chalia are twins and were born in Seattle, WA September 24, 1987. At the age of 3 they moved to Spokane, WA where their brother James was born February 24, 1991. While still in elementary school they moved back to the Seattle area, which is where they have resided ever since. Their parents, James and Elisa Bakker, who play drums and bass (respectively), were musicians in the 1980s Seattle music scene, just prior to Grunge.

== Discography ==
Vol. 1 (album)

- Released: 31 October 2010
- Format: CD
- Label: Self-released

Together We Are The Love Vortex ((EP))

- Released: 6 July 2012
- Format: CD
- Label: Self-released
