= Calling Out =

Studio album by FemBots
- Released: September 16, 2008
- Genre: Indie rock
- Length: 44:48
- Label: Weewerk

FemBots chronology
The City (2005)	Calling Out (2008)

Professional ratings
Review scores
Source	Rating
ChartAttack	3/5 stars
Exclaim!	favorable
Now Magazine	4/5 stars

Calling Out is the fourth album by Canadian indie rock band FemBots, released on September 16, 2008, with Weewerk.

The album was originally intended to use only junk instruments created out of garbage by guest musician Iner Souster. However, the band reportedly found the instruments were not sufficiently reliable to form the basis of the entire album, and instead added some conventional instrumentation while retaining the junk instruments on the songs' rhythm tracks.

In addition to Souster and the FemBots, the album also features Nathan Lawr and Christine Fellows.

== Track listing ==
No.	Title	Length
1.	"Good Days"	4:22
2.	"Can I Be Your Mirror"	3:39
3.	"My Hands Are a City"	4:48
4.	"Get in the Van"	3:44
5.	"God Keep Our Hands Clean"	3:43
6.	"JL Recalls His Amazon Adventure from a Comfortable Chair in the Window of No. 5 The Kingsway"	3:45
7.	"Hand Print in Wet Cement"	3:13
8.	"Lost At Sea"	3:44
9.	"The Ballad of Lucybelle Carter"	3:52
10.	"The End of the Day"	4:44
11.	"Ship Breaking"	5:07
