= Interstellar (band) =

Interstellar was a Canadian rock band based in Toronto, Ontario. The band released two albums of electronic music in the 2000s.

== History ==
The band was formed in 1998 by Rob Boak (guitar, bass, keyboards) and Denis Dufour (guitar, bass, keyboards, vocals). The debut album, Late Night Tea, was released in 2000 on Mother Superior Records. Cam Lindsay of Exclaim! described the record as sounding like it had been recorded "at four in the morning", comparing it with Spiritualized and Tortoise.

Interstellar's second album ToSleepToDreamToWake was recorded over three years and issued in 2004 on Plan Eleven Records, charting across Canada and was aired on campus and community radio. The album contained a mixture of uptempo jazz, psychedelia and electro-pop, overlaid with electronic guitar and synthesizer instrumental work.

Rob Boak also played guitar/Moog in Mean Red Spiders and after Interstellar split up, recorded under the name Cinemascope, Dark Constellations and Infinity Projector.

== Discography ==
- Late Night Tea (2000), Mother Superior
- ToSleepToDreamToWake (2004), Plan Eleven
