= Volume IV: The Lions of Love =

Studio album by Two-Minute Miracles
- Released: 9 October 2007
- Recorded: House of Miracles, London, Ontario, Canada
- Genre: Indie rock
- Label: Weewerk
- Producer: Andy Magoffin

Two-Minute Miracles chronology
Volume III: The Silence of Animals (2003)	Volume IV: The Lions of Love (2007)

Volume IV: The Lions of Love is the fourth album by the Canadian indie rock band Two-Minute Miracles, produced by frontman Andy Magoffin. It was released in 2007 on Weewerk.

== Track listing ==
All songs were written by Two-Minute Miracles.

1. "The Minus Ball"
2. "Put It Out"
3. "Conjoined"
4. "Night Of Rain"
5. "The Bee Hell"
6. "No Fairway"
7. "The Lions of Love"
8. "Unusual Romance"
9. "Since We Were Married"
10. "In a Good Light"
11. "Stay Off the Train Tracks"
12. "Small Face"
13. "Start Your Own Goddam Band"
14. "Salsateria"
15. "Freeloading Is Hot"
16. "Don’t Come Knocking"

== Personnel ==
- The Two-Minute Miracles
  - Andy Magoffin – vocals, guitars
  - Michael Cristoff – piano
  - Aaron Curtis – drums
  - Greg Smith – bass guitar
  - Justin Nace – guitar
- Guest musicians
  - Jenny Mitchell
  - Clay Corneil
