= To Live Alone in That Long Summer =

Studio album by Barzin
- Released: 2013
- Genre: Rock, Pop, Folk
- Label: Monotreme Records

Barzin chronology
Notes to an Absent Lover (2009)	To Live Alone in That Long Summer (2013)

To Live Alone in That Long Summer is an album written by Barzin. It was released in 2013.

== Track listing ==
1. "All The While"
2. "Without Your Light"
3. "In The Dark You Can Love This Place"
4. "Stealing Beauty"
5. "Fake It 'Til You Make It"
6. "In The Morning"
7. "You Were Made For All of This"
8. "Lazy Summer"
9. "It's Hard To Love Blindly"
