= Notes to an Absent Lover =

Notes To An Absent Lover

Studio album by Barzin
- Released: 2009
- Genre: Lo-Fi, Post Rock
- Label: Monotreme

Barzin chronology
My Life in Rooms (2006)	Notes To An Absent Lover (2009)	To Live Alone in That Long Summer (2013)

Notes To An Absent Lover is an album by Barzin, released in 2009.

As well as singer/guitarist Barzin Hosseini, the album features vocalist Melissa McClelland, vibraphone player Robbie Grunwald, and pedal steel guitar player Burke Carroll.

Exclaim! writer Rachel Sanders viewed the album as Barzin Hosseini moving to "a more nakedly melodic songwriting style", calling it "a dreamy, elegant stunner of a folk pop release". PopMatters' Dominic Umile gave it 5 stars out of 10, describing it as "straightforward and dry folk pop, with little decoding needed".

== Track listing ==
1. "Nobody Told Me" 3:09
2. "Words Tangled In Blue" 3:42
3. "Soft Summer Girls" 3:56
4. "Queen Jane" 4:20
5. "When It Falls Apart" 3:31
6. "Lost" 3:50
7. "Stayed Too Long In This Place" 4:36
8. "Look What Love Has Turned Us Into" 3:53
9. "The Dream Song" 5:20
