= Ox (band) =

Canadian alternative country band

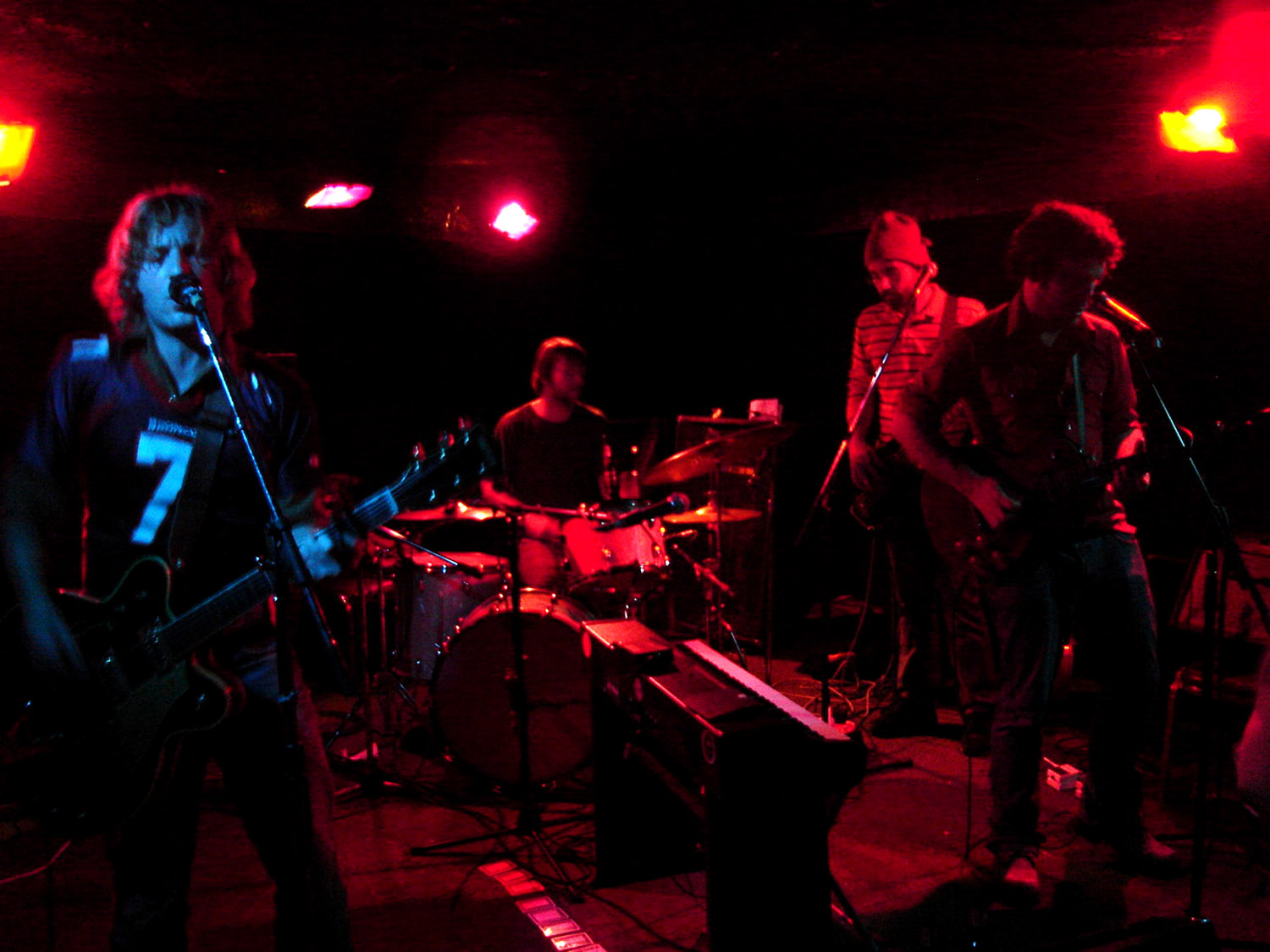
- Ox performing in Sudbury, Ontario

Background information
- Origin: Vancouver, British Columbia, Canada
- Genres: Alternative country
- Years active: 2003–2012
- Labels: Weewerk, Cosmic Daves Record Factory
- Members: Mark Browning; Ryan Bishops; Max Myth; Shawn Dicey
- Website: oxtheband.com

Ox is a Canadian alternative country band active in the 2000s and 2010s, based initially in Vancouver, British Columbia, and later Sudbury, Ontario.

The core of the band consisted of Mark Browning on lead vocals and guitar, Ryan Bishops on guitar and piano, Shawn Dicey on bass, and Max Myth on drums. Jesse Zubot, Nathan Lawr, Kevin Kane and the members of Be Good Tanyas were among the band's frequent guest collaborators.

== History ==
Ox was formed in Vancouver in 2003 after Browning and Bishops moved there from Sudbury. The band released its debut album, Dust Bowl Revival, in 2003. The album was popular on Canadian campus radio where it reached No. 1 across Canada (#56 in the USA CMJ Chart), and the band toured across Canada, the United States and Europe to support the album.

In 2005, the band released a joint album with American band Kid Lightning.

They released their second album, American Lo-Fi, in October 2006. The album reached No. 6 across Canada in !earshot. The band subsequently moved its home base back to Browning's hometown of Sudbury.

Their third album, Burnout, was released in November 2009, and reached No. 5 in !earshot. Videos were filmed for the tracks "Unknown Legend" and "Prom Queen" by Sudbury filmmaker John Alden Milne.

In the same year, Browning launched Cosmic Dave's Sound Emporium, which blended a recording studio, an independent record store, a guitar shop and a live performance venue, in the Donovan neighbourhood of Sudbury.

In 2010, they released Silent Night & Other Cowboy Songs, an album of country renditions of Christmas songs, and Browning and Bishops appeared as guest musicians on Examining the Fallout, the debut album by Sudbury singer-songwriter Brian Dunn.

In 2011, they released the album tUco. This album was intended as the soundtrack for a film project by Milne which never materialized. Milne again directed a music video for the album track "Nico". The album appeared on the !earshot Campus and Community National Top 50 Albums chart in January 2012, along with Silent Night & Other Cowboy Songs. The album was a nominee for Album of the Year, Duo or Group at the 2012 Northern Ontario Music and Film Awards, but lost to Kalle Mattson's Anchors.

Browning subsequently also opened the Beards coffee shop and bakery and the Tuco's Tacos Lounge taco restaurant in Sudbury, with his wife Jessica Nadel.

In 2023, Browning released the first Ox album in twelve years, KTEL. Some of the material had been partially recorded before the birth of his first child in 2012 and sat unfinished. The record took two years to complete with Browning playing almost all the instruments himself, and was recorded at Cosmic Dave's Sound in Sudbury.

== Discography ==
- Dust Bowl Revival (2003)
- IPX No. 6 (2004, split CD with Kid Lightning)
- American Lo Fi (2006)
- Burnout (2009)
- Silent Night & Other Cowboy Songs (2010)
- tUCo (2011)
- KTEL (2023)
