= Small Town Murder Scene =

Studio album by FemBots
- Released: 2003
- Genre: Indie rock
- Label: Paper Bag Records

FemBots chronology
Mucho Cuidado (2000)	Small Town Murder Scene (2003)	The City (2008)

Professional ratings
Review scores
Source	Rating
Allmusic	3.5/5 stars
Pitchfork	8/10

Small Town Murder Scene is the second album by Canadian indie rock group FemBots, released in 2003 on Paper Bag Records.

== Track listing ==
1. "Intro"
2. "Broken and Blue"
3. "Prison Memoirs of an Anarchist"
4. "The Transit Song"
5. "A Million Dead End Jobs"
6. "What Comes After One"
7. "Small Town Murder Scene"
8. "Mom's Ether Blues"
9. "Theme from a Radio Play"
10. "Tombstone Blues"
11. "Outro"
