= Carsie Blanton =

American musician (born 1985)

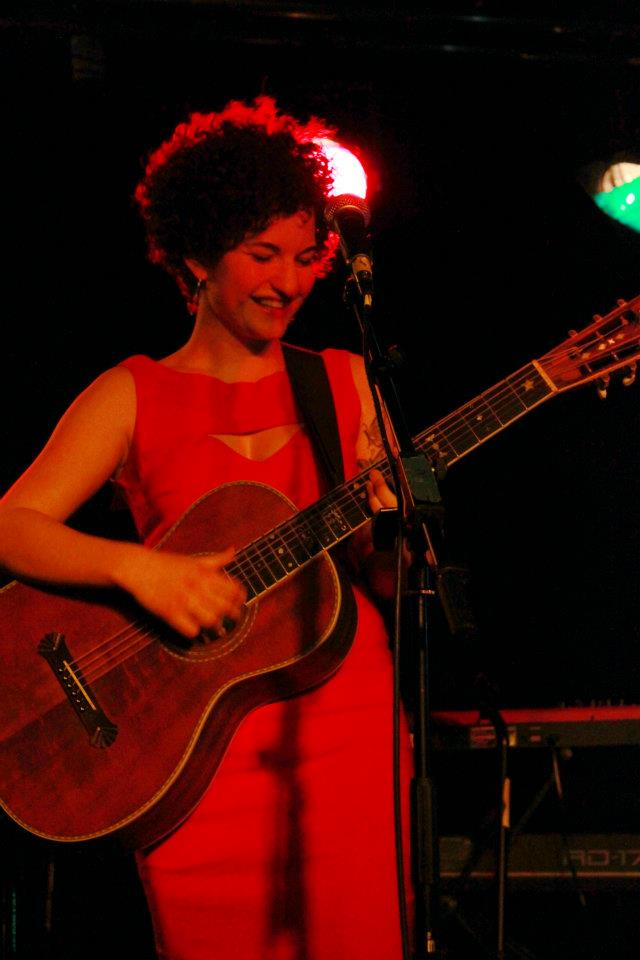
- Carsie Blanton at Milkboy

Background information
- Born: Carson Amanda Blanton; July 22, 1985 (age 41); Luray, Virginia, US
- Origin: Eugene, Oregon, US
- Genre: Rock, folk, jazz
- Occupation: Singer-songwriter
- Instruments: Vocals; guitar
- Years active: 2005–present
- Website: carsieblanton.com

Carson Amanda "Carsie" Blanton (born July 22, 1985) is an American singer-songwriter and activist based in New Jersey. Blanton has released ten full-length albums and three EPs, and performs regularly throughout North America and Europe. She is an organizer with Artists Against Apartheid and with the 2026 re-launch of People's Songs. In fall of 2025, she participated in the Global Sumud Flotilla.

Fresh Air called Blanton "one of those hard-headed open-hearted protestors who can make revolution sound desirable to your body, even if your mind wants to resist it," in reference to her 2021 album Love and Rage.

== Early life ==
Carsie Blanton grew up on a former cattle farm in Luray, Virginia. Her education involved unschooling. She began learning piano at age 6 and playing guitar at age 13. At age 16, Blanton went to live in a group house with other artists and musicians in Eugene, Oregon, and soon went on her first tour singing back-up vocals for a touring funk band.

== Career ==
In 2005, Blanton recorded and self-released her first studio album Ain't So Green. In 2006, Blanton relocated from Eugene to Philadelphia to pursue her music career full-time. She also began working with manager Bill Eib.

Beginning in 2010, Blanton performed as a support act for The Wood Brothers on multiple tours. In 2011, she toured with Anaïs Mitchell's Hadestown, playing one of the Fates. That year Blanton also opened several shows on Paul Simon's So Beautiful or So What tour.

In 2012, Blanton relocated to New Orleans, where she lived until moving back to the Philadelphia area in 2020.

In 2019, she released Buck Up, which Ken Tucker, reviewing the album for NPR's Fresh Air, called "delightfully surprising."

In 2020 and 2021, during the COVID-19 pandemic, Blanton supported herself and her band by playing monthly online rent parties. In 2021, Blanton released Love & Rage, an album of "anti-fascist anthems" produced by Tyler Chester. Her album Body of Work (also produced by Chester) was released one song per month throughout 2022 and 2023.

After the titular single's release in fall 2023, Blanton's album After the Revolution was released in 2024. Soon after, she released the home-recorded Red Album Vol. I.

In 2026, Blanton released Red Album Vol. II, which includes Hello, Comrade, a song she began writing in Israeli prison. In March 2026, Blanton released Everything Is Great, a collaborative album with Canadian folk-punk band The Burning Hell.

Blanton's albums have all been released independently. She receives direct support from her fans on Patreon. She typically performs live with her quartet, which includes Joe Plowman on bass, Sean Trischka on drums, and Isa Burke on fiddle and guitar. In 2026, she toured extensively with The Burning Hell in the U.S. and in Europe.

== Other activities ==
In October 2025, Blanton took part in the Global Sumud Flotilla to bring humanitarian aid to the Gaza Strip, sailing on the boat Paola Uno. She spent a week in an Israeli prison as a result of her participation.

In September of 2026, Carsie was a guest on the Upstream podcast, discussing FBI repression of artists and musicians during the Cold War. In the episode, she also references her organizing work with People's Songs and with Artists Against Apartheid.

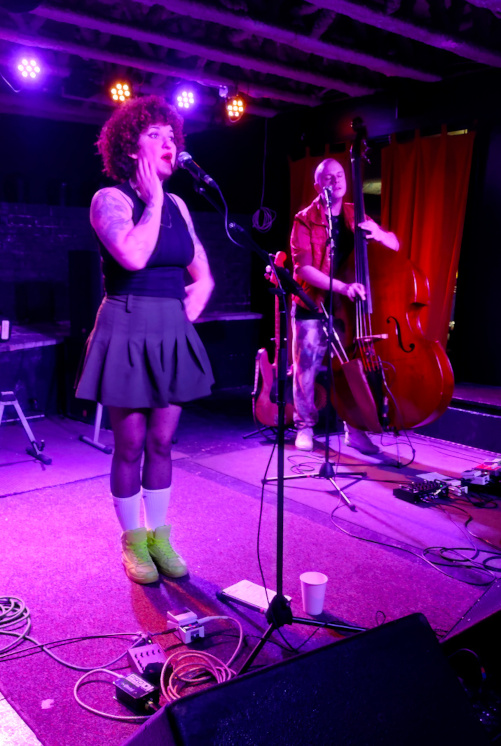
Carsie Blanton and Joe Plowman at the Southern Cafe in Charlottesville, Virginia, February 8, 2025.

== Discography ==
Year	Album
2005	Ain't So Green
2009	Buoy
2010	Beau
2012	Idiot Heart
2014	Not Old, Not New
2016	So Ferocious
2019	Buck Up
2021	Love & Rage
2022	Body of Work
2024	After the Revolution
2024	The Red Album, Volume 1
2026	The Red Album, Volume 2
2026	Everything is Great
