= Blood Meridian (band) =

Canadian alternative country band

- Origin: Vancouver, British Columbia, Canada
- Genres: Alternative country
- Years active: 2004-2009
- Labels: Outside Music; Elevation Recordings; Teenage USA
- Members: Matt Camirand; Jeff Lee; Shira Blustein; Kevin Grant; Joshua Wells

Blood Meridian was a Canadian alternative country band based in Vancouver, British Columbia. The band consisted of singer and songwriter Matt Camirand, guitarist Jeff Lee, keyboardist Shira Blustein, bassist Kevin Grant and drummer Joshua Wells. Camirand had been with The Black Halos, He and Wells were also members of Black Mountain and Pink Mountaintops; Wells was a member of Lightning Dust as well. Lee had been with 3 Inches of Blood and Black Rice.

The band was named for Cormac McCarthy's 1985 novel Blood Meridian, or the Evening Redness in the West.

== History ==
Blood Meridian was formed in 2004. That year the band released its debut album, We Almost Made It Home. They followed up in January 2006 with the EP Soldiers of Christ.

In July 2006, they released their second album, Kick Up the Dust on Outside Music in Canada, and internationally on V2 Records. On November 20, 2007, the band released their third album Liquidate Paris!.

In 2006, the band toured Europe with The Black Keys, Black Mountain and Pink Mountaintops. In 2009, Blood Meridian played Emergenza, the world's largest festival of unsigned bands.

Wells and Camirand then went on to play with numerous bands. Blustein opened a restaurant. As of 2021, Jeff Lee and his wife Jenni were in a band called Hard Drugs.

== Discography ==
- We Almost Made It Home (2004), Teenage USA
- Soldiers of Christ (2006, EP), Outside Music
- Kick Up the Dust (2006), Outside Music, V2 Records
- Liquidate Paris! (2007), Elevation Recordings
