= Dust Bowl Revival =

Studio album by Ox
- Released: 2003
- Genre: Alternative country
- Label: Independent
- Producers: Chôn, Ox

Ox chronology
Dust Bowl Revival (2003)	American Lo Fi (2006)

Dust Bowl Revival is the debut album by Canadian band Ox, released in 2003. The album was released independently with distribution by Scratch. The record was subsequently released in the United States by Second Nature Recordings, in the United Kingdom by 72th Street Records, in Germany by Arctic Rodeo Recordings, and re-released in Canada by Maximum Music. The record reached No. 1 across Canada on the campus radio Earshot chart in August 2003.

The album also featured cover versions of songs by Julian Cope and Pink Floyd.

Guest musicians on the album included Nathan Lawr and Jesse Zubot.

== Track listing ==
1. "Transam"
2. "LA City"
3. "Stolen Car"
4. "Carolinah"
5. "Weaving"
6. "Blue Morning"
7. "Stolen Bike"
8. "Fat Old Sun"
9. "North Country Girl"
10. "She Shot Me Down"
11. "Promised Land"
12. "Oh Eileen"
