= Teenage USA Recordings =

Canadian independent record label

Teenage USA Recordings is a Canadian independent record label, founded by Phil Klygo and Mark DiPietro in the fall of 1997 on the back of Klygo's Skull Geek record label and fanzine.

The label, based in Toronto, has released records by artists such as Elevator, Eric's Trip, The Weekend, Pecola, Gaffer, Smallmouth, Peaches, Stink Mitt, Dan Bryk, Kid Lunch, Thanatopop, Cecil Seaskull, Two-Minute Miracles, Lonnie James, Blood Meridian, Solar Baby, Robin Black, The Zoobombs, The Exploders, 122 Greige, The Killer Elite, Neck, and Mean Red Spiders.

Song Corporation bought into the label in 2000 and named Klygo and DiPietro as Song's Directors of Artistic Development. Following Song's bankruptcy a year later, the pair regained ownership of their label and signed a distribution deal with Outside Music. Shortly thereafter, DiPietro took a job at Outside, running their in-house label in addition to teenage USA. Klygo took over as Festival Director at Canadian Music Week, as well as starting a new experimental gallery-salon space with artist Germaine Koh called (weewerk) that eventually became a record label.

== Teenage USA Recordings discography ==
Year	Artist	Title	Type	Catalog number
1996	Pecola	Dat Hoang EP	EP	teen 002
1996	Smallmouth	All Ports in Frequent Seas		teen001
1998	Pecola/Smallmouth	Pecola / Smallmouth	7"	teen 003
1998	Lonnie James	This Land is Your Land	CD	teen 004
1998	Gaffer	Snow Falls Like Stars	CD	teen 005
1998	Mean Red Spiders	Places You Call Home	CD	teen 006
1998	Solarbaby	The Power of Negative Prayer	CD	teen 007
1998	Cecil Seaskull	Whoever	CD	teen 008
1998	Neck	Uncrated Distant Star EP	CD, EP	teen 009
1998	122 Greige	Moving Away from the Sun	CD	teen 010
1998	The Two-Minute Miracles	Volume I	CD	teen 012
1999	Kid Lunch	Kid Lunch	CD	teen 011
1999	Lonnie James	Dee-O	CD	teen-14
1999	Thanatopop	Four Track Mind	CD	teen 015
2000	Peaches	Peaches	CD, EP	teen017, teen 3017-2
2000	The Exploders	Who's Who & What's What	7", EP	teen 020
2000	Dan Bryk	Lovers Leap	CD	teen 021, teen 3021-2
2000	The Weekend	The Weekend	CD	teen 3016-2
2000	Robin Black & The Intergalactic Rock Stars	Star Shaped Single	CD, EP	teen 3018-2
2000	Mean Red Spiders	Starsandsons	CD	teen 3019-2
2000	Elevator	Taste of Complete Perspective	CD, LP	teen 3023
2001	Various	Ear Candy Song Sampler: January 2001 "Cherry"	CD	SEC01-01
2001	Gord Disley	Shots Fired	CD	teen 024
2001	The Killer Elite	"End of a Whip / Talk About the City"	7"	teen 026
2001	The Exploders	New Variations	CD	teen 027
2001	The Two-Minute Miracles	Volume II: Thirteen Songs from the House of Miracles	CD	teen3022
2001	Eric's Trip	The Eric's Trip Show (Recorded Live in Concert 1991-1996)	CD	teen-3025
2001	Zoobombs	Bomb You Live	CD	teen 3028
2002	Mean Red Spiders	Still Life Fast Moving	CD	teen 3030
2002	The Weekend	Teaser EP	CD, EP	teen 3029, teen 3034 (2003)
2003	Great Lake Swimmers	Great Lake Swimmers	CD	teen 033
2003	Stinkmitt	Scratch 'N' Sniff	CD	teen3031
2003	The Two-Minute Miracles	Volume III: The Silence of Animals	CD	teen3032
2004	Blood Meridian	We Almost Made It Home	CD	teen 035
2004	Stinkmitt	Biker Shorts (Remix)	12"	teen 036
2005	The Weekend	Beatbox My Heartbeat		teen37

== See also ==
- List of record labels
