= Together We Are the Love Vortex =

Together We Are The Love Vortex

EP by The Tempers
- Released: July 6, 2012
- Recorded: At Kirknasty Studios
- Genre: Synthpop, glam, art rock
- Length: 26:56
- Producer: James Bakker, The Tempers

The Tempers chronology
Vol. 1 (2010)	Together We Are The Love Vortex (2012)

Together We Are the Love Vortex is the second release by American electronic art rock band The Tempers, self-released on 6 July 2012.

A music video for the track "You Must Be Crazy" was released following Together We Are the Love Vortex.

== Track listing ==
All tracks written and composed by The Tempers.

No.	Title	Length
1.	"You Must Be Crazy"	3:49
2.	"Dark Days"	5:15
3.	"Is This Love"	6:08
4.	"They Say In Love"	5:33
5.	"Love Vortex"	6:11

== Personnel ==
- Corina Bakker – vocals, artwork
- Chalia Bakker – drums
- James Bakker – synthesizer, bass, guitar, engineer
- Anastasia Kiryanova – photography
- Eddy Schreyer/ Oasis – mastering
