= Slash Need =

Canadian industrial electropunk band

Slash Need is a Canadian industrial electropunk band from Toronto, Ontario, who released their debut album Sit & Grin in 2025.

The band's core members are Dusty Lee and Alex Low, with dancers Camille Jodoin-Eng and Stella Tago performing with the band. Lee and Low first met when they were working at Double Double Land, an underground art and performance venue in Toronto, and formed the band in 2018 with a friend and other founding member Maggie Smith. The name was chosen after one of Low's text responses to Lee's list of band name ideas was "whatever you want slash need", thus Lee coined the name Slash Need while the inclusion of dancers in their live show was inspired after Lee watched old videos of The Hidden Cameras performing at Will Munro's Vazaleen club night.

In 2024 the band performed at Bruce LaBruce's annual underground Toronto International Film Festival party at the Bovine Sex Club, and in 2025 they performed at SXSW. They performed extensively at music festivals in 2025, prior to releasing Sit & Grin on October 21. They promoted the album with further festival appearances, including at Pop Montreal and Lawnya Vawnya, as well as a full tour of Europe.

Sit & Grin was longlisted for the 2026 Polaris Music Prize.
