= Public Library (album) =

Studio album by The Burning Hell
- Released: April 1, 2016
- Recorded: June 2015
- Studio: Big Jelly Studios, Ramsgate, UK
- Genre: indie rock
- Label: Headless Owl, BB*Island

The Burning Hell chronology
People (2013)	Public Library (2016)

Public Library is the seventh studio album by The Burning Hell. It takes songwriter Mathias Kom's story songs further than ever before, and all tracks have been given a literary classification. The band recorded the album in the middle of a UK tour in Ramsgate at Big Jelly Studios. The album was mixed by Jeff McMurrich at 6 Nassau in Toronto, and mastered by Bo Kondren at Calyx in Berlin.

Narc Magazine rated the album four out of five.

== Track listing ==
1. "The Stranger" (Murder Mystery)
2. "The Road" (Music Biography)
3. "Fuck the Government, I Love You" (Romantic Comedy)
4. "Men Without Hats" (Coming of Age story)
5. "Good Times" (True Crime)
6. "Give Up" (Literary Criticism/Philosophy)
7. "Two Kings" (Science Fiction/Fantasy)
8. "Nonfiction" (Romance)

== Personnel ==
- Mathias Kom - guitar, trombone, vocals
- Darren Browne - guitar, vocals
- Nick Ferrio - bass, vocals
- Jake Nicoll - drums, organ, vocals
- Ariel Sharratt - clarinet, saxophone, vocals
