= American Lo Fi =

2nd album of country-alt band Ox

Studio album by Ox
- Released: 2006
- Genres: Alternative country Indie rock
- Label: Weewerk
- Producers: Chôn, Ox

Ox chronology
Dust Bowl Revival (2003)	American Lo Fi (2006)	Burnout (2009)

American Lo Fi is the second album by Canadian alt-country band Ox, released in 2006. The CD was released by Weewerk and vinyl released by Saved By Vinyl, both with distribution by Outside Music. Covers on the album include "Surrender" by Cheap Trick, 1913 Massacre by Woody Guthrie, and "Country Music Promoter" by Lavon Lyle. It reached #6 on Canadian campus radio at Earshot and Chart Attack.

American Lo Fi was the first to feature song contributions by a band member other than Mark Browning, those being new full-time band members Ryan Bishops and Rose Murphy as well as guest contributors Trish Klein, Jesse Zubot, Marta Jaciubek, and Kevin Kane Ryan Bishops contributed both "Sugar Cane" and "Civilization."

== Track listing ==
Order	Title	Length	Notes	Ref
1	"Miss Idaho"	3:31		
2	"Surrender"	3:46	Cheap Trick cover	
3	"Sugar Cane"	3:29		
4	"747"	3:42		
5	"El Camino pt2"	3:09		
6	"Country Music Promoter"	3:53	Cover of "Truck Drivin' Country Music Promoter" by Lavon Lyle	
7	"1913"	5:14	Woody Guthrie cover	
8	"Civilization"	4:27		
9	"El Camino pt1"	2:49		
10	"Martas Song"	2:58		
11	"Awkward Beauty"	5:12		
