= Volume Three =

Volume Three, Volume 3 or Volume III may refer to:

== Music ==
=== Albums ===
- Volume 3 (She & Him album), 2013
- Vol. 3... Life and Times of S. Carter, a 1999 album by Jay-Z
- Volume 3: A Child's Guide to Good and Evil, a 1968 album by The West Coast Pop Art Experimental Band
- Volume 3: The Kids Have Eyes
- Volume 3: Further in Time, a 2001 album by Afro Celt Sound System
- Volume 3 (Easybeats album), 1966
- Volume 3 (Fabrizio De André album)
- Volume III: The Silence of Animals, a 2003 album by Two-Minute Miracles
- Volume III (Kamchatka album)
- Vol. 3: (The Subliminal Verses), a 2004 album by Slipknot
- Volume Three, a 1992 album published by Volume
- Traveling Wilburys Vol. 3
- Volume III (September Mourning EP), a 2019 EP by heavy metal band September Mourning
- Volumen ProIIIbido, a 2006 album by Cartel de Santa
- Volume 3: Set Coordinates for the White Dwarf!!!, 1998 album by The Desert Sessions

=== Songs ===
- "Volume III" (song), a 1981 song by Stars on 45

== Other uses ==
- Guardians of the Galaxy Vol. 3, a 2023 superhero film

== See also ==
- Three-volume novel
