= B.A. Johnston =

Canadian musician

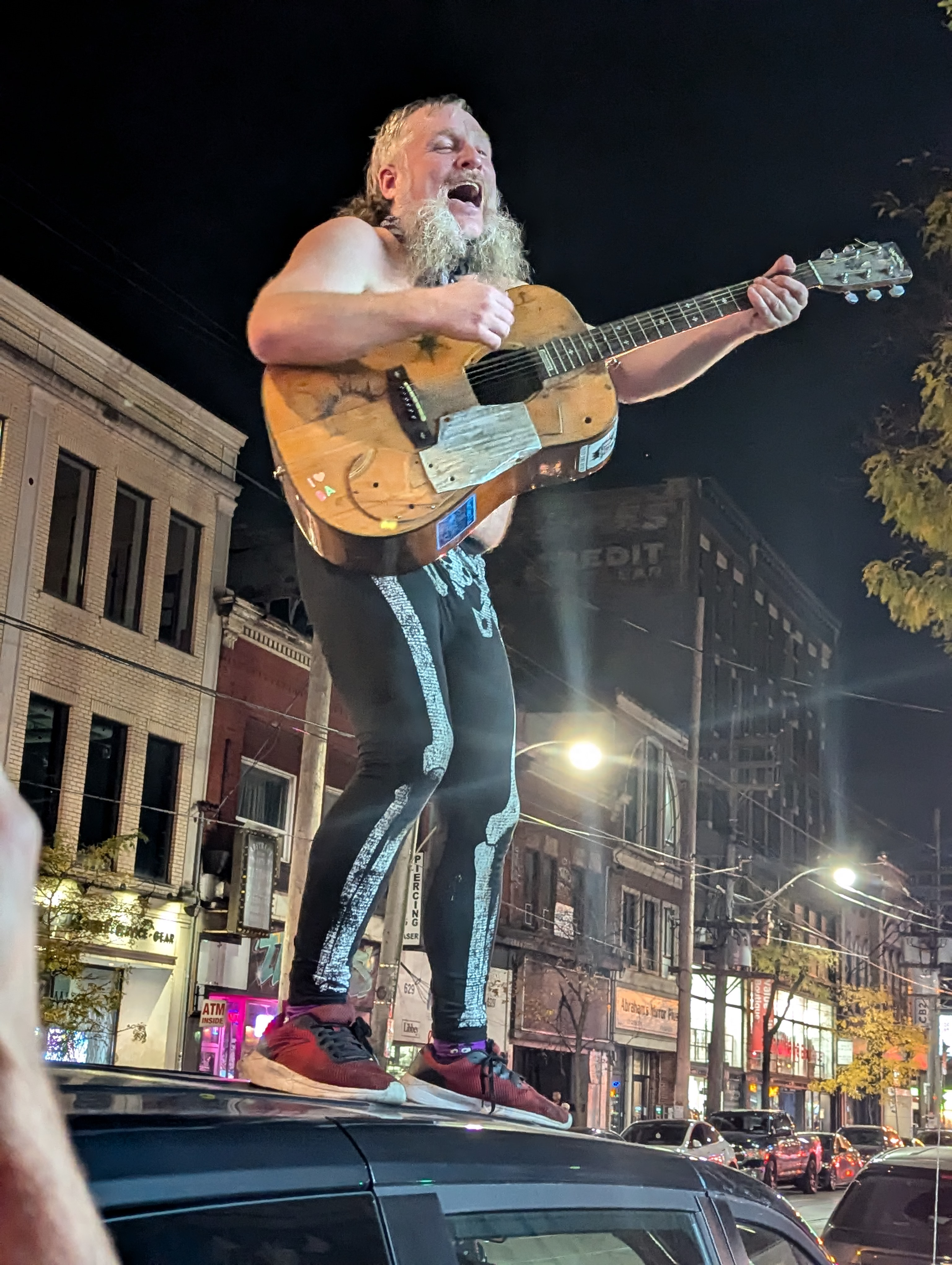
- Johnston playing outside Toronto's Bovine Sex Club on top of his van in 2024.

Background information
- Born: Christian; Hamilton, Ontario, Canada
- Genre: Comedy
- Occupations: Musician, performance artist
- Website: www.bajohnston.ca

Christian Johnston (born 1974/1975), known professionally as B.A. Johnston, is a Canadian comedic musician and performance artist based in Hamilton, Ontario.

== Early life ==
Johnston was born and raised in Hamilton, Ontario. He attended Westdale Secondary School and earned a philosophy degree at Trent University.

== Career ==
He began touring around Canada in 2002, performing songs that are often comedic in nature and include pop cultural references to sports teams, junk food, and video games. Accompanying himself on guitar and keyboard, he performed as the character B.A. (Bored Again) Johnston who lives at home with his mother. By birth, his name is Christian Johnston, but in high school was given the nickname “Bored Again Christian". It stuck over the years and became his stage name.

By 2006 Johnston had recorded four albums of original songs, completing a cross-country tour travelling exclusively by Greyhound bus before beginning to tour in an old station wagon or mini-van. Johnston's 2010 album Thank You for Being a Friend appeared on the !Earshot National Top 50 Chart. Since that time he has continued touring extensively across Canada year-round, mainly performing in clubs and bars. In 2014, Noisey compared him to American singer, songwriter GG Allin. His ninth album Shit Sucks was released in 2015 and was a long list nominee for the 2015 Polaris Music Prize. Exclaim! magazine described it as "simplistic synth-pop and aggressive acoustic folk."

In 2017 a collaboration between Johnston and Sawdust City Brewing Company resulted in the launch of Olde B.A. Johnston's Finest Malt Liquor. That year his album Gremlins III, a mixture of folk and punk music, was released through Wyatt Records. That year a feature article about Johnston in the Globe And Mail acknowledged his polarizing status in the Canadian music scene, noting that for some he is a "modern-age Stompin' Tom Connors."

In 2019 he began producing and starring in a show called "B.A. Johnston's Ham Jam", where he visits various places in Hamilton and talks to personalities around the city.

As of 2026, Johnston continues to tour across Canada, performing his show.

== Discography ==
Albums (CD, LP)

- Bury Me at Make Out Creek (2001)
- In Situation Bad (2003)
- Love Letters to the Girls in My High School Art Class (2003)
- My Heart Is a Blinking Nintendo (2005)
- Call Me When Old and Fat Is the New Young and Sexy (2006)
- Stairway to Hamilton (2008)
- I Was a Young Man Once (2009)
- Thank You for Being a Friend (2010)
- Hi Dudes! (2012)
- Mission Accomplished (2013)
- Shit Sucks (2015)
- Gremlins III (2017)
- The Skid Is Hot Tonight (2019)
- Werewolves of London, Ontario (2022)
- Argos Suck (2023)
- I Don't Know Who Needs to Hear This Right Now, But They Are Never Coming Back and You Will Die Alone (2026)

Singles, Splits, & EPs

- Songs About a Stewardess (2005)
- B.A. Johnston & The Moby Dicks (2011)
- B.A. Johnston featuring The Magnificent Sevens (2011)
- B.A. Johnston Supreme Quarantine 7” Split w/ The Burning Hell (2020)
