= Kelly McMichael =

Canadian singer-songwriter

Kelly McMichael is a Canadian singer-songwriter from Peterborough, Ontario based in St. John's, Newfoundland and Labrador. Her music has been described as Alternative with experimental or art rock elements and nods towards classic pop from the 70s, 80s, and 90s.

Kelly’s second album 'After The Sting Of It', released September, 2024 was longlisted for the 2025 Polaris Music Prize. . The single "Bomb" claimed #14 on Exclaim! and #53 on CBC Music's Top Songs of 2024 lists, spent 6 months in heavy rotation on The Verge (XM). The album peaked at #27 on Earshot campus and community radio charts.

Her debut full-length album Waves was released in 2021, and was shortlisted for the 2022 Polaris Music Prize. and also won the East Coast Music Association Award for 'Best Rock Recording'.

A graduate of the integrated arts program at Peterborough Collegiate and Vocational School and the fine arts program at the University of Guelph, McMichael spent some time in Toronto, performing as a keyboardist in Gentleman Reg's band and fronting the feminist synth-pop band Rouge, before moving to St. John's in 2013. She has performed both under her own name and the stage name Renders, electronic alter-ego.

She began recording her first album Waves in 2019. The album was delayed when she and her co-producer/engineer/drummer Jake Nicoll were both stranded back in Ontario during COVID-19 lockdowns, with production and mixing continuing remotely.

Kelly has performed with Tim Baker, appearing throughout his 2024 album 'Full Rainbow of Light' and she performed as part of Sarah Harmer's band during her tour to support for Are You Gone (2020-2023). She has also played with Canadian acts The Burning Hell (2021-2023) and Allie X (2012) and The Hidden Cameras. She began touring regularly as a solo artist in 2021 and also spends time writing, recording and producing at her home studio.
