= Mean Red Spiders =

Canadian alternative rock band

- Origin: Toronto, Ontario, Canada
- Genres: Alternative rock
- Years active: 1993–present
- Labels: Claire Records; Teenage USA
- Members: Adam Rosen; Dave Rodgers; Minesh Mandoda; Lisa Nighswander; Greg Chambers; Scott Cameron; Marco Landini; Eric Abboud; David Humphreys

Mean Red Spiders are a Canadian alternative rock band from Toronto, Ontario. Their music is largely guitar-based indie rock influenced by psychedelic music. The band makes extensive use of distortion, digital keyboard loops, recorded voice samples, and effects pedals, creating a repeatable orchestrated wall of sound style with vocals. Usually categorized by some reviewers into the shoegaze, dream pop, or space rock genres.

This band is not to be confused with the earlier British R&B group from Ipswich, Suffolk, of the same name (1985–1993) who issued two albums, Nude Guitarist in Wet Lettuce Frenzy (1988) and Dark Hours (1991); the punk rock band made up of members of The Chesterfield Kings; or the UK outfit performing under the same name.

== History ==
"Never Heard of You"
"Never Heard of You" from Stars and Sons

The Mean Red Spiders formed in Toronto in September 1993. The original members were lead vocalist Greg Chambers, guitarist David Humphreys, drummer Don Goldrick, who named the band, and bassist Nick Andrews. They began performing in clubs and bars in Toronto. Andrews left the band soon after, and Lisa Nighswander joined to play bass and sing.

In 1995, drummer Goldrick left the band, and after a few shows with Paul Boddum, Adam Rosen was hired as a replacement. That year they self-released a tape, El Diabolo.

The album Places You Call Home was co-produced by Dave Newfeld with Mean Red Spiders. It was recorded in 1997 and 1998 in the basement of a rental house at Bathurst and Lawrence, and combined with some bass, guitar and drum tracks recorded by Al Forte in 1996. The album was released in 1998 by Teenage USA, and included Minesh Mandoda on keyboards, guitars, and loops. In 2000 the band released Starsandsons; this album was recorded and produced by Newfeld at Stars and Sons Studio located in Chinatown, Toronto.

In 2001, the band toured in the eastern US. Humphreys left the band, and guitarist Rob Boak (of Interstellar) joined, contributing three songs to the album Still Life Fast Moving and touring with the band in 2002. Jeff McMurrich recorded and co-produced this album in his studio at Dupont and Spadina and in the band's Pod Studio. At the time of the album's release in January 2003, Mean Red Spiders personnel were Boak, Rosen, Mandoda, Nighswander, and Chambers.

Boak left the band early in 2003 and Dave Rodgers (of Neck/Christiana) joined. Humphreys later rejoined the band in 2007. Mean Red Spiders continue to record and release material, while also playing in Ghostlight, a free-form improvisational collective featuring members of Mean Red Spiders along with James Anderson and Scott Cameron.

== Other band members ==
Other musicians that have been in MRS include:

- Martin (vocals on El Diabolo's Devo cover "Mongoloid")
- Leanne Davies - Drums (of Amor de Cosmos/Mason Hornet)
- Jim Bravo - Drums (of Jim Bravo & the Beethoven Frieze)
- Antony Seabourg - Drums

== Discography ==
- El Diabolo (1995)
- Places You Call Home (1998, Teenage USA)
- Starsandsons (2000, Teenage USA)
- Still Life Fast Moving (2003, Clairecords)
- I Am the Sea (2014, self-released)
