= Andy Magoffin =

Canadian musician and record producer

Joel Andrew Magoffin, best known as Andy Magoffin, is a Canadian musician and record producer. He is the songwriter, vocalist and guitarist for the indie rock band Two-Minute Miracles and the touring bass guitarist for Raised by Swans.

His extensive record-producing credits have led Now magazine to dub him "the Timbaland of southern Ontario alt-country"; he has produced albums for artists including Great Lake Swimmers, The Hidden Cameras, The Constantines, By Divine Right, Royal City, The Priddle Concern, Detective Kalita, The Weekend, The Burning Hell, The Patients, The Parkas, Panic Coast, The Randals and Jim Guthrie.
