= Vol. 1 (The Tempers album) =

Studio album by The Tempers
- Released: October 31, 2010
- Genre: Synthpop, Glam, Art rock
- Length: 52:49
- Producer: James Bakker, The Tempers

The Tempers chronology
Vol. 1 (2010)	Together We Are The Love Vortex (2012)

Vol. 1 is the debut studio album by American electronic art rock band The Tempers, self-released on 31 October 2010.

A music video for the track "Alone Again" was released following Vol. 1.

== Track listing ==
All tracks written and composed by the Tempers

No.	Title	Length
1.	"Alone Again"	4:52
2.	"Discorporate"	4:34
3.	"No Direction"	5:24
4.	"Love"	5:38
5.	"Nile Style"	3:46
6.	"Easy Livin'"	5:04
7.	"In Roses"	4:14
8.	"Speaking In Tongues"	5:37
9.	"Fix"	5:36
10.	"Galactic Love"	5:54
11.	"Space Race"	2:10

== Personnel ==
- Corina Bakker – vocals, artwork
- Chalia Bakker – drums
- James Bakker – synthesizer, bass, guitar, engineer
- Lee Blackwell – guitar soloist (4)
- Elisa Bakker – cello (2, 9)
- Will Klintberg – guitar "whale calls" (2)
- Ronnie Champagne – drum engineer (9)
- Eddy Schreyer/ Oasis – mastering
- Photographers – Frank Correa, Nick Bartoletti, Elisa Bakker, The Tempers, Lord Fotog, Aaron Lugg, Damien Goyenechea, Mike De Leon
