= My Life in Rooms =

My Life In Rooms

Studio album by Barzin
- Released: 2006
- Genre: Lo-Fi, Post Rock
- Label: Monotreme Records

Barzin chronology
My Life In Rooms (2006)	Notes to an Absent Lover (2011)

My Life In Rooms is an album written by Barzin. It was released in 2006.

== Track listing ==
1. "Let's Go Driving" 3:58
2. "So Much Time To Call My Own" 4:59
3. "Leaving Time" 5:25
4. "Just More Drugs" 3:21
5. "Take This Blue" 4:31
6. "Acoustic Guitar Phase" 4:28
7. "Won't You Come" 3:29
8. "Sometimes The Night..." 3:10
9. "My Life In Rooms" 4:24
