= Camille Delean =

Canadian musician

Camille Delean is a Montreal-based Canadian musician. She has released two albums: Music on the Grey Mile (2017) and Cold House Burning (2020). Born and raised in Ontario, Delean then lived in Nashville, Paris, and London, before settling in Montreal. Her second album was preceded by the single "Fault Line (Late July)".

== Discography ==
=== Studio albums ===
- Music on the Grey Mile (2017)
- Cold House Burning (2020)

=== Singles ===
- "Fault Line (Late July)."
