= Wavelength Music Arts Projects =

Music series

- Genre: Experimental, Pop, World
- Locations: Toronto, Ontario, Canada
- Years active: 2000 – present
- Website: wavelengthmusic.ca

Wavelength is a music series and festival presenter based in Toronto, Ontario, Canada. The project was founded in 2000 by Jonathan Bunce (Jonny Dovercourt), Duncan MacDonell (Doc Pickles), and Derek Westerholm. The concept evolved from an open-table meeting of musicians and enthusiasts on September 11, 1999, which then developed into a weekly Sunday showcase , and monthly print zine profiling the artists performing. Wavelength’s current programming includes a year-round music series, two annual festivals, as well as a music industry conference and research studies.

== History ==
The first instalment of the music series took place February 13, 2000 at Ted's Wrecking Yard, featuring Toronto artists Mean Red Spiders and Neck. During Wavelength's second month Canadian artist Michael Snow personally screened his 1967 piece "Wavelength" before his performance at Ted's Wrecking Yard.

Following an event headlined by The Constantines in August of 2001 for Wavelength’s 18 month anniversary at Ted’s Wrecking Yard, the venue closed. The event moved to Lee’s Palace, the concert series then moved to Sneaky Dee’s in 2002.

Wavelength incorporated as a not-for-profit as Wavelength Music Arts Projects in 2007.

In 2009 Wavelength announced that the weekly Sunday showcase would transition from its weekly to a monthly series, as well as moving its home venue to the newly opened Garrison in 2009.

The company grew larger throughout the 2010s. In 2010 Wavelength debut the outdoor summer ALL CAPS! Island Festival, a two-day event at Artscape Gibraltar Point on Toronto Island.

During COVID-19 pandemic Wavelength paused in-person live music operations in 2020. Since the resumption of live events in 2022, Wavelength established its new location St. Anne’s Parish Hall in Toronto, which now acts as its primary venue, branded as Wavelength @ St. Anne’s.

== Research & Publications ==
=== Any Night of the Week ===
Executive Director Jonathan Bunce’s (aka Jonny Dovercourt) debuted book: ‘’Any Night of the Week’’ (Coach House Book). The book documents the history of Toronto’s ‘Do-It-Yourself’ music scene from 1957 to 2001.

=== Reimagining Music Venues ===
Following the success of ‘’Any Night of the Week’’ and the new uncertain state of Toronto’s live music scene following the COVID-19 pandemic, Wavelength Music co-published the research study ‘’Reimagining Music Venues’’, in collaboration with Prof. Daniel Silver at the University of Toronto’s School of Cities. The report outlines the challenges that Ontario’s live music landscape faces, ranging from financial and real estate constraints, as well as mismatched economic expectations between artists, audiences, and venues. Alongside the identified challenges, the report proposes various solutions that could be implemented to modernize Ontario's live music industry.

‘’Reimagining Music Venues’’ acted as a resource to the establishment of LIVE Music Toronto in collaboration with the Canadian Independent Music Association (CIMA) and MusicOntario in 2026, an industry collective of independent music venues and presenters based in Toronto representing these organizations on local and regional policy and advocacy matters.

== Notable Artists who have played Wavelength ==
- Alex Cameron
- Bibi Club
- Broken Social Scene
- Cadence Weapon
- CCMC
- Cloud Nothings
- Colin Stetson
- Cuff the Duke
- Deerhoof
- The Dinner is Ruined
- Do Make Say Think
- Exhaust
- Hailu Mergia
- Hania Rani
- Henri Fabergé and the Adorables
- Feist
- Final Fantasy
- Getatchew Mekurya
- Ghost Bees
- Grimes
- Holy Fuck
- Jazz Cartier
- Lael Neale
- Lullabye Arkestra
- Mean Red Spiders
- METZ
- Odonis Odonis
- Peaches
- Pony Da Look
- Raising the Fawn
- The Russian Futurists
- Sleepytime Gorilla Museum
- Sook-Yin Lee
- Status/Non-Status
- TOPS
- Think About Life
