= United Steel Workers of Montreal =

- Origin: Montreal, Quebec, Canada
- Genre: Alternative country
- Years active: 2004–2011
- Past members: Gern F; Felicity Hamer; Sean Beauchamp; Matt Watson; Flipper Frumignac; Dylan Perron
- Website: www.uswm.ca

United Steel Workers of Montreal (or USWM) were a six-piece alternative country ensemble based in downtown Montreal, Quebec. The core band members included Gern f Vlchek (vocals/acoustic guitar), Felicity Hamer (vocals/accordion), Sean "Gus" Beauchamp (vocals/acoustic guitar), Matt Watson (electric guitar), accompanied by Roger Dawson, then Eddy Blake Eaton and finally Flipper Frumignac (on bass), and Kevin Mcneilly, then Christopher Reid, and finally Dylan Perron (on banjo/mandolin). The band drew on punk rock, bluegrass and country influences.

== History ==
The band began as an informal busking collective, playing every Tuesday in Montreal's Lucien-L'Allier metro station. After about seven or eight months, they booked a rehearsal space and began to actively record and perform as a permanent band. Their debut album Broken Trucks and Bottles was released in April 2005 and featured Sean Moore on banjo, mandolin and guitar. Shortly after the album's release Moore left the band and was replaced by Kevin McNeilly, while session man Roger Dawson also became a member.

The new lineup followed with Kerosene and Coal in 2007. That same year, a Montreal Mirror readers' poll voted them the third best act in the city, behind only Arcade Fire and electronic duo Team Canada. In 2007 Dawson left the band and was replaced by bass player Eddy Blake Eaton.

From 2008 to 2001, the group toured extensively throughout Canada, with an emphasis on small, out-of-the-way towns. They also appeared at industry showcases, including performances at 2007 Canada Music Week and shows at the 2008 SXSW and Ottawa Bluesfest. Their music has also been playlisted on CBC Radio 3. Between tours the group continued performing in Montreal. In an announcement posted to their official website, USWM disbanded at the end of 2011, citing both personal reasons and creative differences in the band.

== Discography ==
- 2005 Broken Trucks and Bottles
- 2007 Kerosene and Coal
- 2009 Three on the Tree
