= Volume III: The Silence of Animals =

Studio album by Two-Minute Miracles
- Released: 2003
- Recorded: House of Miracles, London, Ontario, Canada
- Genre: Indie rock
- Label: Teenage USA

Two-Minute Miracles chronology
Volume II: Thirteen Songs from the House of Miracles (2001)	Volume III: The Silence of Animals (2003)	Volume IV: The Lions of Love (2007)

Volume III: The Silence of Animals is the third album by the Canadian indie rock band Two-Minute Miracles. It was released in 2003 on Teenage USA Recordings.

== Track listing ==
All songs were written by Two-Minute Miracles.

1. "Open the Front Door"
2. "I'm Getting a Feel"
3. "Aphasia"
4. "Half an Average Song"
5. "Stall Tactics"
6. "The Silence of Animals"
7. "Theme from Volume III"
8. "Another Quicksand Voice"
9. "Warm Air vs. Cold"
10. "Crumb"
11. "Running Out of Freon"
12. "Victim of This Town"
13. "National Ant-Hum"
