= Barzin =

Canadian singer-songwriter

- Genres: Slowcore, folk, indie
- Occupations: Vocalist, singer-songwriter
- Years active: 1995–present
- Labels: Monotreme, Where Are My Records
- Website: www.barzinh.com

Barzin is a Canadian singer-songwriter known for his slow and melancholic songs. Barzin has released five albums in his career.

== Career ==

A project that began in 1995, Barzin was initially a solo endeavor before expanding to incorporate a wide array of collaborating musicians. Despite the addition of a full ensemble, the music maintained its focus on the aesthetics of quietness and minimalism, exploring the understated side of pop. Musicians who have contributed to the project over the years include Tony Dekker (Great Lake Swimmers), Nick Zubeck (Sun Kill Moon), and Diana Planche (The Paint Movement).

Barzin has released five full-length studio albums. The self-titled debut album was released in 2003 through the Montreal-based label Where Are My Records. The following year an E.P. titled Songs for Hinah, was released through the French-based label, Hinah and in Europe through Monotreme Records, described by Allmusic as "a lush, lovely, and ultimately monochromatic effort".In 2006, the second full-length album, My Life in Rooms, was released through Monotreme Records. Notes to an Absent Lover followed in 2009, released worldwide by Monotreme Records; it was recorded by Don Kerr and Jeremy Darby and mixed by Chad Irschick and Darryl Neudorf. The Independent stating "its ambient textures feel rich enough to luxuriate in, evoking the suspended animation of big sadness with exquisite poise". To Live Alone in That Long Summer, the fourth album, was released in March 2014 by Monotreme Records and Ghost Records (Italy). Contributors to this album included Sandro Perri, Les Cooper, Tony Dekker, Daniela Gesundheit of Snowblink, and Tamara Lindeman of The Weather Station. It received favourable reviews in publications such as Rolling Stones, New York Times, USA Today.The fifth full-length album, Voyeurs in the Dark, which was five years in the making, was released in May 2022 by Monotreme Records, followed by a European tour in the fall of 2022.

Barzin has toured extensively internationally. The albums have received critical acclaim and coverage in major music publications. Mojo selected Notes to an Absent Lover as their Americana Album of the Month. Rolling Stone, The New York Times, and USA Today featured To Live Alone in That Long Summer. Interviews and features with Billboard, Exclaim!, The Village Voice, Salon, and MTV Italy have also profiled the project. Albums have received four-star reviews in publications such as Uncut, Q, AllMusic, The Independent, Chart, and Now, and music has been featured as NPR's Song of the Day. While touring in Europe, Barzin was selected by the music site La Blogothèque to participate in their "Take Away Sessions" series.

In addition to recording artist work, Barzin has worked as a producer. Credits include co-producing the album The Slideshow Effect for the band Memoryhouse, which was released by Subpop Records, and producing the album for Canadian artist Set Feux in 2022.

Over the years, Barzin’s music has been featured in several television series and films, including the ABC series Wonderland, Shattered, Felicity, The Listener, Less Than Kind, the HBO series Vice Principals, and Animal Planet programming. Soundtrack placements also include the Italian feature film Meno male che ci sei directed by Luis Prieto, Greenland's first international feature film Nuummioq directed by Torben Bech and Otto Rosing (which premiered at the Sundance Film Festival), Alan Zweig’s documentaries Lovable and The Singhampton Project, the Netflix series Motor Valley, and the feature film The Last Sunrise.

Barzin has also composed original scores, including for the film Viewfinder directed by British filmmaker Jason Yeomans, the 2023 film The Shadow of My Life directed by Hajar Moradi, and the short film Burden directed by Vahid Fazel. Filmmaker Vincent Moon directed Barzin's first music video, which premiered on Stereogum.

The band has drawn comparisons to Low, Red House Painters, and Sparklehorse.

== Discography ==
=== Studio albums ===
- Self Titled, 2003

- My Life in Rooms, 2006
- Notes to an Absent Lover, 2009
- To Live Alone in That Long Summer, 2014
- Voyeurs in the Dark, 2022

=== EPs ===
- Barzin, 2000
- Songs for Hinah, 2004
- Just More Drugs, 2006
- Moonpalace, 2014
