= Volume Two =

Volume Two, Volume 2, Volume II or Vol. II may refer to:

- Vol. 2... Hard Knock Life, a 1998 album by rapper Jay-Z
- Volume 2 (Herb Alpert's Tijuana Brass album), 1963
- Vol. 2 (Breaking Through), by The West Coast Pop Art Experimental Band
- Volume Two (The Soft Machine album), 1969
- Volume Two (She & Him album), 2010
- Volume Two (EP), a 1991 EP by Sleep
- Volume 2 (CKY album), 1999
- Volume 2 (Chuck Berry album)
- Volume 2 (Billy Bragg album), 2006
- Volume 2 (Reagan Youth album)
- Volume 2 (The Gordons album), 1984
- Volume 2 (The Bouncing Souls album), 2020
- Volume 2 (Giants in the Trees album), 2019
- Volume 2 (video), a 1999 video by Incubus
- Volume 2: Release, a 1999 album by Afro Celt Sound System
- Vol. II (Angine de Poitrine album), 2026
- Vol. II (Hurt album), 2007
- Vol. II (Cartel de Santa album)
- Vol.2 (Goo Goo Dolls album), 2008
- Vol. 2 (Radio Company album), 2021
- Vol. 2 (Wooden Shjips album), 2010
- Volume II (Kamchatka album)
- West Meets East, Volume 2, 1968 studio album by Yehudi Menuhin and Ravi Shankar
- Joan Baez, Vol. 2
- Miles Davis Volume 2
- Guardians of the Galaxy Vol. 2, a 2017 sequel to its 2014 predecessor.
- Volume Two, a 1991 album released by Volume (magazine)
- Volume II (September Mourning album), a 2016 album by heavy metal band September Mourning
- Vol. II: 1990 – A New Decade, a 1990 album by Soul II Soul
- Volume 2: High and Inside, 2011 album by The Baseball Project
- Volume 2: Release, 1999 album by Afro Celt Sound System
- Volume 2: Status: Ships Commander Butchered, 1998 EP by The Desert Sessions
- Volume II: Thirteen Songs from the House of Miracles, 2001 album by The Two-Minute Miracles
- Volume Dois, 1998 album by Titãs
- Vol. 2: Vintage, 2003 EP by Jay Dee
- Formula, Vol. 2, 2014 album by Romeo Santos
  - Vol. 2 Tour, concert tour to promote the album
