= The Two-Minute Miracles =

- Origin: London, Ontario, Canada
- Genres: Indie rock
- Years active: 1995–present
- Labels: Teenage USA; Weewerk
- Members: Andy Magoffin; Justin Nace; Michael Christoff; Aaron Curtis; Greg Smith
- Past members: John F. Higney Jr. Mississauga Slim; Clayton Corneil
- Website: myspace.com/twominutemiracles

The Two-Minute Miracles are a Canadian indie rock band from London, Ontario, fronted by songwriter and singer-guitarist Andy Magoffin. The band had a history of fluid membership.

== History ==
The band's name was taken from their early preference for keeping their songs approximately two minutes long, although some songs on their later recordings have exceeded that length. Exclaim! magazine has described the band's songs as "catchy, richly melodic pop tunes occasionally run through with a sinuous, alt-country flavour and an underlying element of playful eccentricity."

The band released three albums on Teenage USA; the second, 13 Songs from the House of Miracles, included horns, banjo, lap steel and piano. The third, The Silence of Animals, was released in 2003. The band later signed with Weewerk. Weewerk released Volume 3.5: Rats, a digital-only preview of the full-length, in July 2007 and Volume IV: The Lions of Love which was released in October 2007. At that time the band consisted of Magoffin, guitarist Justin Nace, keyboardist Michael Christoff, bassist Greg Smith and drummer Aaron Curtis.

== Discography ==
- 1999: Volume I
- 2001: Volume II: Thirteen Songs from the House of Miracles
- 2003: Volume III: The Silence of Animals
- 2007: Volume 3.5: Rats (Limited EP, digital only)
- 2007: Volume IV: The Lions of Love
