= Volume (festival) =

Music festival in Sydney, Australia

- Genre: Performing arts, Visual arts
- Frequency: Annually
- Locations: Art Gallery of New South Wales, Sydney
- Years active: 2023 - present
- Inaugurated: 2023
- Previous event: 13 June 2024 – 23 June 2024
- Next event: 2025
- Organiser: Art Gallery of New South Wales
- Website: Official website

Volume is an annual performing arts festival held by the Art Gallery of New South Wales in Sydney, Australia. The inaugural event was held in 2023 following the development of the Sydney Modern expansion to the gallery in 2022. It combines live music, film and visual arts with a focus on experimental performances by domestic and international artists. Many of the headline events of the festival are held in The Tank, a repurposed subterranean oil tank located beneath the gallery. The festival has received praise for the uniqueness of its performance venue and the experimental nature of its programming, although some critics observed and discussed difficulties in the event balancing the expectations of audiences expecting either experimental performances or traditional live music gigs.

== History ==
Kim Gordon performing inside The Tank during Volume in 2024.

In 2019, the Art Gallery of New South Wales and Government of New South Wales commenced a $344 million expansion to the gallery titled the Sydney Modern. The expansion included development of a new gallery wing, atrium and sculpture gallery space and The Tank, a subterranean gallery accessible by stairs to a 2200 square metre space beneath the new building. The Tank was designed from refurbished oil tanks discovered close to the gallery site in Woolloomooloo rediscovered in 2014. The tanks were originally constructed in the early 1940s to supply British naval ships during World War II. The Sydney Modern project was completed in 2022 and opened to the public on 3 December.

The inaugural Volume festival and program was announced in June 2023 and held over 22 September to 8 October 2023. Gallery director Michael Brand stated that the festival was designed in line with the use of the Sydney Modern development to expand the vision of the gallery beyond visual arts to include live music, film and performance. Music and Community Curator Jonathan Wilson stated the festival's programming sought to provide a space for audiences to experience popular artists in unexpected or challenging ways. Funding for Volume is supported by the Government of New South Wales Government under the Create NSW Blockbusters Funding initiative and sponsored by Destination NSW. The 2024 season of Volume was announced in May 2024 and held in July 2024.

== Events ==
Year	Dates	Performances	Source
2023	22 September - 8 October	Headline shows: Solange, Sampa The Great, TENGGER, Kim Moyes; Free shows: North and South (Akio Suzuki, Alexandra Spence, Amby Downs, Annea Lockwood, David Shea, David Toop, Ellen Fullman, Hiromi Miyakita, JG Thirlwell, JWPaton, Lawrence English, Lisa Lerkenfeldt, Loren Mazzacane Connors, Philip Smartzis, Primitive Motion, Saint Abdullah, Theresa Wong, Vanessa Tomlinson).	
2024	5 - 21 July	Headline shows: Genesis Owusu, Tkay Maidza, Kim Gordon, Andre 3000 Free shows: Extasis (Jim O'Rourke, Eiko Ishibashi, Hand to Earth, Carl Stone, Keiji Haino, Nyokabi Kariuki, Chilhei Hatkeyama, Gail Priest, Madeline Cocolas)	
2025	TBA		

== Reception ==
The festival has received praise for the uniqueness of its venue. Toby Hemming of TheMusic described the venue as "overwhelming" and "dramatically stunning", and Alys Hale of RUSSH described it as "part subterraneean colosseum" and "part concrete forest". However, some noted the acoustics of the venue as a concrete interior were not ideal for some performances, with Jefferson describing the architecture of The Tank as a "devilish disruptor of sound and sightlines" that was suitable more for ambient and experimental performances than for live music. Dan Condon of ABC felt that The Tank was "not an easy space" and was "the perfect setting for unpredictable music", although writing that its "huge number of concrete poles provide brilliant structural integrity but awful sightlines".

The experimental qualities of the programming were praised. Joseph Earp of Music Feeds stated the 2023 festival had an "ambition on display that is unusual for live music events" to "push audience members further [and] bypass their expectations". The Solange performance was particularly highlighted, with Billy Burgess of Music Feeds highlighting the performance's "unique", "stranger" and "more idiosyncratic" nature than traditional performances, and Jefferson stating the show was "satisfyingly unusual" and "had that potent 'you had to be there' quality that site-specific work often has".

However, several critics expressed that the festival received mixed responses from audiences. Some critics observed mixed reactions to experimental performances by popular artists such as Solange or Andre 3000, with performances at odds to that of a traditional gig. Jefferson assessed the event faced difficulties in meeting the expectations of both the "art crowd" and "gig crowd" in a music festival context, and that the festival was "in search of an identity and not quite sure how to make the best use of its main venue" given the competing demands of audiences.
