= The Burning Hell (band) =

Canadian band

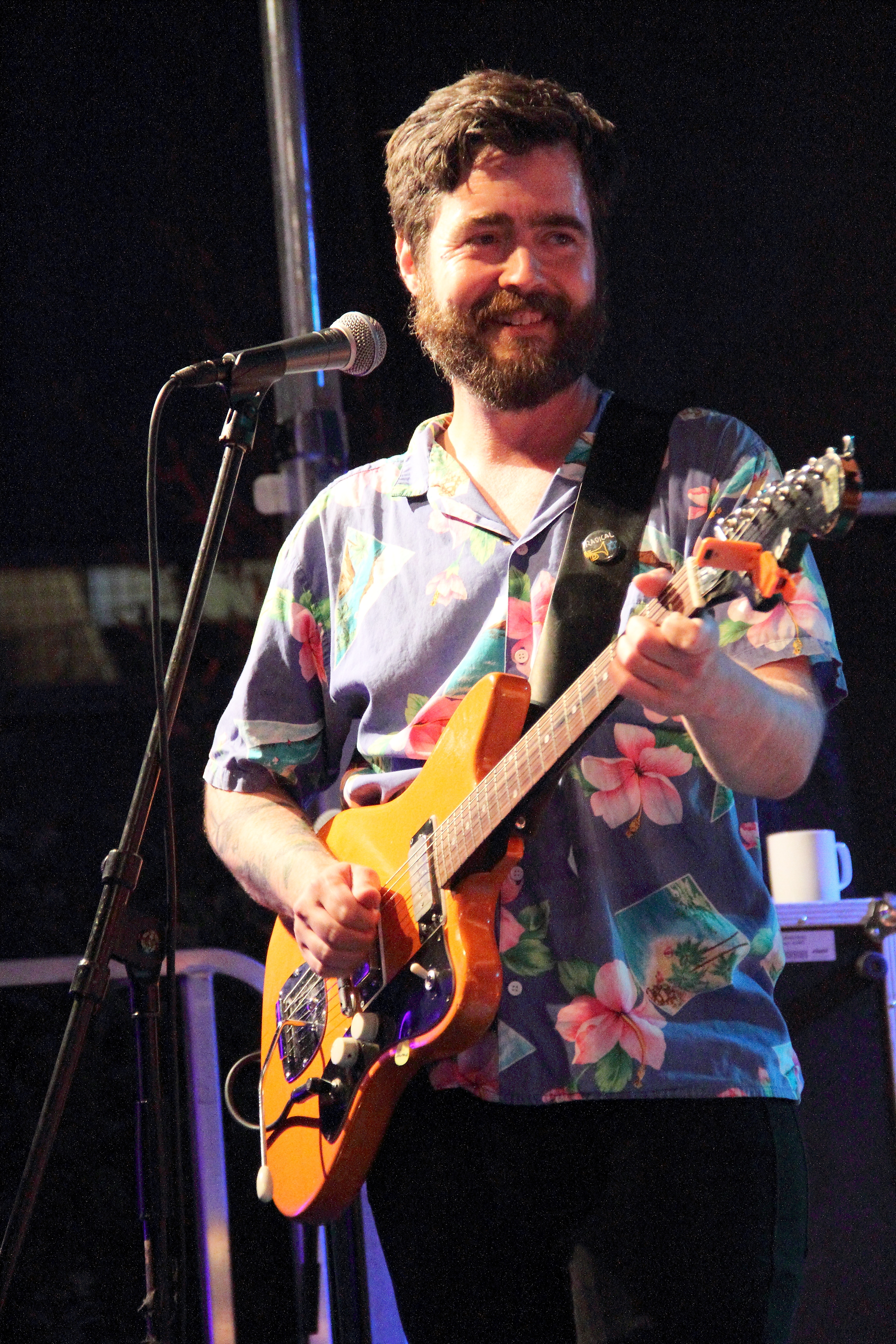
- Mathias Kom performing in Schorndorf, at Manufaktur's 50th Anniversary in 2018.

Background information
- Genres: Indie rock; indie pop
- Years active: 2006–present
- Labels: You've Changed Records, BB*Island, Weewerk, Rough Trade Records, Ticker Records, Headless Owl Records
- Members: Mathias Kom; Ariel Sharratt; Jake Nicoll
- Past members: Darren Browne; Nick Ferrio
- Website: theburninghell.com

The Burning Hell is a Canadian band fronted by songwriter Mathias Kom and artist and multi-instrumentalist Ariel Sharratt, particularly known for their literate songwriting, DIY ethos, and dynamic live performances. Kom holds a PhD in ethnomusicology at Memorial University of Newfoundland, where he studied the political economy of DIY music.

== History ==
The Burning Hell began in 2006 as the songwriting project of Mathias Kom. During the first few years of the band's existence, band membership fluctuated from tour to tour and album to album and the band's instrumentation was often determined by what instruments Kom's friends played. The regular touring and recording lineup from 2011 to 2016 was consistently Kom, Ariel Sharratt (clarinet), Darren Browne (guitar), Nick Ferrio (bass) and Jake Nicoll (drums). Since 2013 Kom and Sharratt have embarked on occasional duo tours and since 2017 the band has toured with a variety of lineups, always including Kom on guitar and vocals and Sharratt—who switches between drums, bass, and woodwinds.

Since 2022, their live lineup has been rounded out with a variety of special guests, often including Jake Nicoll. Other guests have included Steve Lambke, Kelly McMichael, Toby Goodshank, Shotgun Jimmie, Jon McKiel and Jay Crocker.

Known for their live shows and hyper-literate lyrics, The Burning Hell have toured extensively in Europe, North America, and Australia. Kom's songs frequently take the form of fantastic narratives ("Bird Queen of Garbage Island", "The Stranger", "Barbarians", "Nonfiction", "Grave Situation Pt. 1"). Other subject matter has included the apocalypse ("When the World Ends", "Supermoon", "Birdwatching"); failure and amateurism ("Give Up", "Amateur Rappers", "Professional Rappers"); and nostalgia and pop music ("Nostalgia", "Men Without Hats", "Grown-Ups").

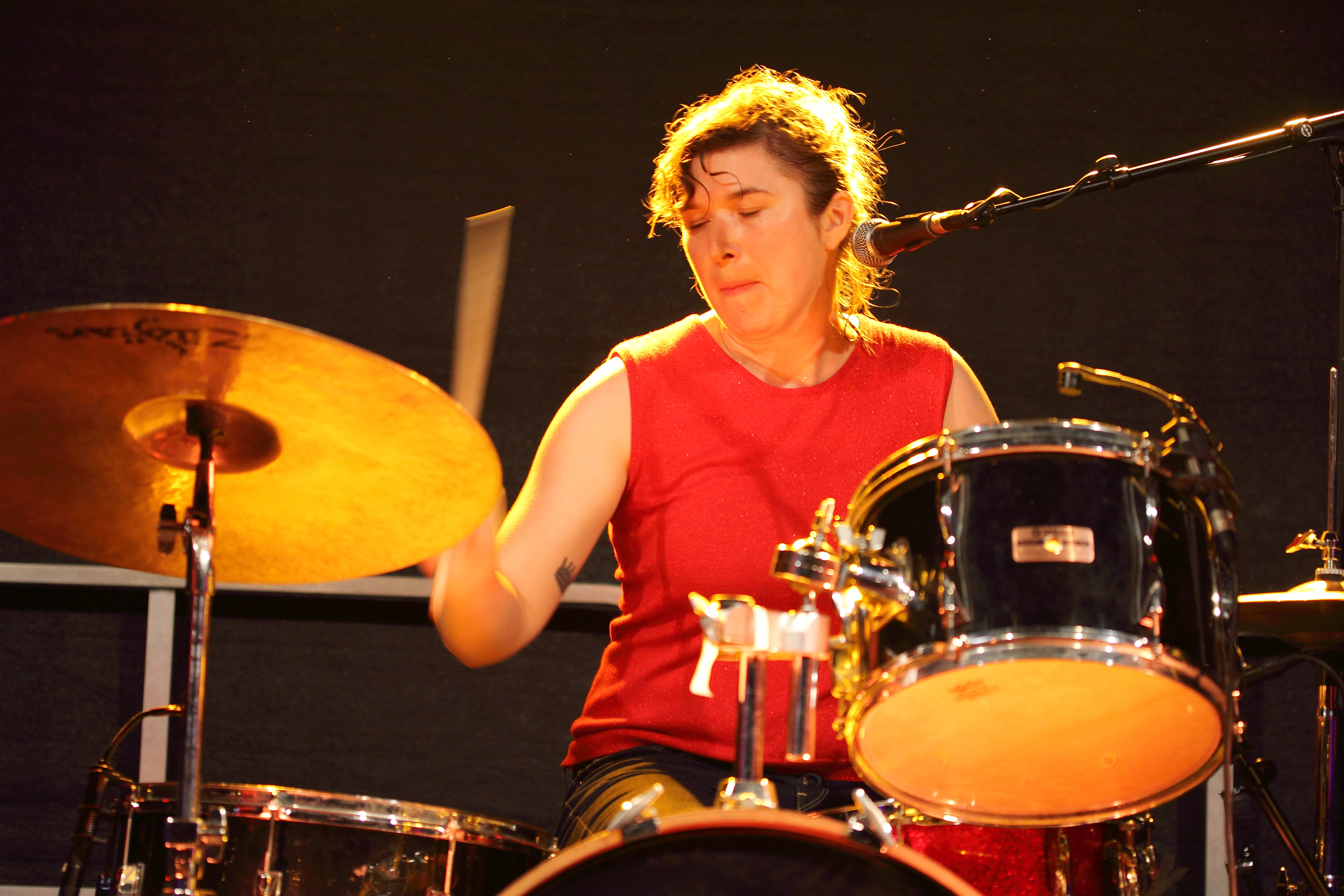
Ariel Sharratt playing drums at Manufaktur’s 50th anniversary in Schorndorf, Germany.

In 2011, Kom and Sharratt co-founded the Lawnya Vawnya Festival in St. John's, Newfoundland.

In 2012 the band played 10 shows between the Netherlands and Slovenia in twenty-four hours. The band claims the unofficial world record for playing the most shows in different countries in 24 hours.

In 2014, the tribute album My Name Is Mathias, featuring Canadian and international musicians performing the band's songs, was released, featuring covers by artists such as John K. Samson, Mike O'Neill, Mike Feuerstack, Dan Mangan, Dave Bidini, Great Lake Swimmers and Susie Asado. Kom donates all proceeds from the sale of this album to the Kingston Humane Society.

The Burning Hell released the albums Public Library in 2016, Revival Beach in 2017 and Never Work in 2020. Garbage Island was self-recorded and produced by Kom, Sharratt, and Nicoll during the pandemic, and released in 2022 on You've Changed Records and BB*Island.

In recent years The Burning Hell have become known for their frequent collaborations and playful relationship to performance. With collaborator Shotgun Jimmie they toured Never Work with a robot drummer in 2024. In 2025 they released Ghost Palace and toured the record with Shotgun Jimmie, Jon McKiel, Maria Peddle, and Jay Crocker. In 2026 they announced a collaborative record with American songwriter Carsie Blanton.

== Discography ==
Albums

- Tick Tock (2006), Weewerk
- Happy Birthday (2008), Weewerk
- Baby (2009), Weewerk
- This Charmed Life (2010), Weewerk
- Flux Capacitor (2011), Weewerk
- People (2013), BB*Island
- Public Library (2016), BB*Island
- Revival Beach (2017), BB*Island
- Garbage Island (2022), BB*Island, You've Changed Records
- Ghost Palace (2025), BB*Island, You've Changed Records

EPs

- The Burning Hell and Construction & Destruction (2009) split 7-inch, Independent
- Saddle Sores (2011), Ticker Records
- Hear Some Evil (2011) split 7-inch with Wax Mannequin, Label Fantastic!
- Duets mit Germans (2011), Ticker Records
- Old, New, Borrowed, Blue (2013) 10-inch, Headless Owl Records
- Birdwatching On Garbage Island (2019), Independent
- Hardly Working (2024)

Singles

- "Grave Situation Part One" (2008) split 7-inch with Jenny Omnichord
- "Amateur Rappers" / "Professional Rappers" (2014) 7-inch
- "Pop Goes The World" / "Men Without Hats" (2016)
- "9 To 5" / "Game Of Pricks" (2019)
- "No Peace" (2019) split 7-inch with Boo Hoo
- "I Want to Drink in a Bar" (2020) split 7-inch with B.A. Johnston
- "Bird Queen of Garbage Island" / "Birdhouse in Your Soul" (2021) 7-inch with accompanying comic book
- "Nigel the Gannet"/ "Lark Descending" (2022)

Compilations

- My Name Is Mathias (2014), Headless Owl Records
- Live Animals (2015), Independent

Folk Duo Albums by Mathias Kom & Ariel Sharratt

- Don't Believe the Hyperreal (2015), BB*Island
- Never Work (2020), BB*Island
- Hardly Working (2024) with Shotgun Jimmie

== See also ==
- Music of Canada
- Canadian rock
- List of bands from Canada
