= Krista Muir =

Canadian singer

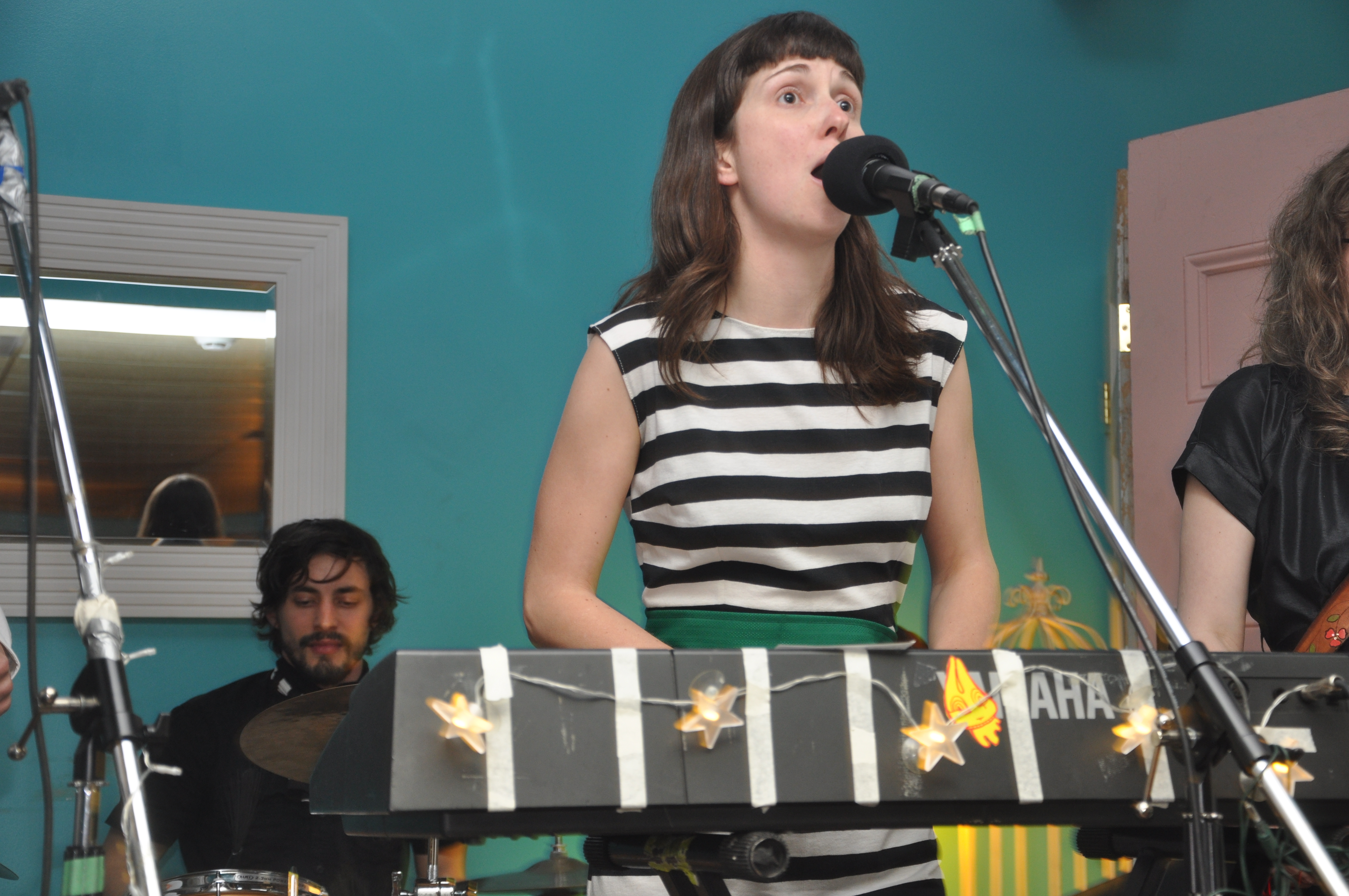
Krista Muir in 2011

Krista Muir is a Canadian indie rock singer-songwriter and keyboardist based in Montreal, Quebec. She initially used the stage name and persona of Lederhosen Lucil, but in 2007, she also began recording and performing under her own name. She plays two vintage Yamaha keyboards, and sometimes a ukulele, to accompany her singing.

== Early life ==
Muir was born in Kingston, Ontario, and went to University in Montreal, Quebec. As a child she took piano lessons and listened to The Ramones, The Clash and The Pet Shop Boys. She also loved television shows Pee Wee's Playhouse, with Pee Wee Herman, Read All About It, Seeing Things, Sol and Dr. Who. A classically trained violinist and pianist, she started writing songs in high school in all-girl trio Wild Girl Soup (self taught bassist/singer). She also played bass in a ska surf band Polka Kola - having met members from various departments at McGill University. It wasn't until she was gifted a Yamaha PSR-180 in 1998 that she began journaling her daily grind through songs.

== Career ==
Muir, initially an active part of the musical theatre, youth orchestra and choir community growing up in Kingston, Ontario, began performing in 1998 as alter ego "Lederhosen Lucil." As Lucil she released a cassette LL...Let's Hose! in 1999 (recorded at Hawksleytown Studios with engineer Karl Mohr), Frozenhosen in 2000 (which later was combined with the cassette, remastered and released as her first "official" release Hosemusik), Hosemusik in 2002 (most of which was recorded at Junkshop Recording Studio in Toronto with band Fembots), and Tales From the Pantry in 2003. Tales was recorded/mixed in June, 2003 in only 10 days in Brooklyn, NY by engineer-producer Terence Bernardo in anticipation of the 70-performance tour LL was invited to by friend and former roommate Eric San (DJ Kid Koala). Kid Koala's Short Attention Span Theatre Tour of fall/winter 2003 (North America and Europe) garnered her an international fan base. She worked with one of her favourite filmmakers Kara Blake on the Semi-Sweet video (for which Kid Koala did a remix)

In 2005, while on a 4-month tour as Lederhosen Lucil in Europe, Muir began writing songs on a tiny, cheap soprano ukulele.

In 2007 Muir began performing under her own name, and within a year she had released two albums featuring the baritone-ukulele - Leave Alight and Accidental Railway,. Aside from Accidental Railway released under Indica Records, Muir has self-released all her albums under her hypo records apartment label. She worked with musician and visual artist Shane Watt on these two releases.

In 2011 Muir recorded and mixed psych folk pop album, Between Atoms at Marsonic Studios. This is the first album Muir engineered, mixed, produced and did the artwork for, featuring more original material and accompanying her singing and with several vintage keyboards, soprano-tenor-baritone ukulele, violin, omnichord, and percussion.

Muir's genre-bending 2013 album, Guten Tag Gemini, includes post punk pop folk rock garage and dance songs performed under her own name and alter-ego Lederhosen Lucil. They "duet" on Skate for their Lives (about Women's Hockey, of which Muir is a fan and LL played at several Montréal Stars CWHL games - the intro features live audio from a game and backing vocals include her sister Kori Muir). She refers to this album as a "compilation" as it features two songs live off the floor with Ottawa's Mercy Buckets (Sensitive Boy and Rich Family) and a slew of misfit songs recorded at Marsonic Studios. Due to a severe flare-up of chronic illness Endometriosis, Muir had to cancel her tour dates for Guten Tag Gemini.

In March, 2016, Muir held a residency at Fisch Haus in Wichita, Kansas entitled Chanson-O-Grammes: Beloved Object Edition. She composed songs about several articles lent to her while in residence. Also in 2017 Muir provided backup vocals at Hotel2Tango at the request of engineer producer Howard Bilerman for the Karpinka Brothers album Talk is Cheap.

Living with unpredictable chronic illness endometriosis greatly limited her touring abilities but Muir wrote, self-engineered, and released The Tides in 2018, stating that it was the album that "saved my life." Songs include Social Pariah, Girl Possessed, What Doesn't Kill You, and The Knife. For each song, visual artist, musician and videomaker Amy Torok created psychedelic visuals for the live performance/lyric videos. She wrote a piece about catharsis through creativity for the Endometriosis Foundation of America and continues to volunteer and sit on the board of the Endometriosis Network Canada. Muir did several Canadian "psychedelic storytelling" shows in support of this album.

Muir has incorporated the contributions of other artists on her albums and those of other artists as well as in live recordings. Artists with whom she has collaborated include Kid Koala, filmmaker Kara Blake, producer Shane Watt and Paul Beaulieu.

== Discography ==
- Lederhosen Lucil... Let's Hose! (1999)
- Frözen Hosen (2000)
- Hosemusik (2002)
- Music to Climb Stairs By (2003)
- Tales From the Pantry (2003)
- Apricota (2004)
- Leave Alight (2007)
- Accidental Railway (2008)
- Between Atoms (2011)
- Guten Tag Gemini (2013)
- A Pocket Full of Lullabies (2015)
- The Tides (2018)
