= Volume Eight =

Volume Eight or Volume VIII or Volume 8 may refer to:

- Volume 8 (Fabrizio De André album)
- Volume 8 (Banda Calypso album)
- Volume 8: The Threat Is Real, by Anthrax
- Volume Eight, an album published by Volume magazine
- Volume 8: Can You See Under My Thumb? There You Are., 2001 EP by The Desert Sessions
- Volumes 7 & 8, compilation album by The Desert Sessions
