= Volume Seven =

Volume Seven, Volume VII, Volume 7 or Vol 7 may refer to:

- Volume 7, a 2008 album by Brazilian rock band Violeta de Outono
- Volume 7, a 2001 album by Kim Jong Kook
- Volumes 7 & 8, a 2001 album by The Desert Sessions
- Volume Seven, compilation in the Volume magazine series, July 1993
- Volume 7: Gypsy Marches, a 2001 album by The Desert Sessions
- Volume 7 (Violeta de Outono album), 2007

== See also ==
- 7 (disambiguation) § Albums
