= Volume Five =

Volume Five, Volume 5, Volume V can represent:

- Volume 5: Anatomic
- Volume Five, an album published by Volume magazine
- Jock Jams, Volume 5
- Volume 5: Poetry for the Masses (SeaShedShitheadByTheSheSore) The Desert Sessions
- On Broadway Volume 5
- Volume V: Believe, an album by Soul II Soul
- Volume V, an album by Down
