= Jordy Walker =

Bermudian sailor (1939–2010)

Personal information
- Full name: Beverly Wayne Walker
- Nationality: Bermuda
- Born: 7 May 1939
- Died: 11 December 2010 (aged 71) Hamilton, Bermuda
- Height: 1.68 m (5.5 ft)

Sailing career
- Sport: Sailing
- Class: Soling
- Updated on 1 March 2014

Beverly W. "Jordy" Walker (7 May 1939 – 11 December 2010 in Hamilton) is a sailor from Bermuda. Walker represented his country at the 1972 Summer Olympics in Kiel. Walker took 15th place in the Soling with Kirkland Cooper as helmsman and Alex Cooper as fellow crew member.
