= Volume Ten =

Volume 10, Volume X, Volume Ten or Vol. 10 may refer to:

- Volume 10 (rapper)
- Volume 10: I Heart Disco, Desert Sessions
- Ed Rec Vol. X
- Volume 10, album by The Vibrators
- Vol. 10, album by Buckcherry
