= Volume II: Thirteen Songs from the House of Miracles =

Studio album by The Two-Minute Miracles
- Released: 2001
- Recorded: House of Miracles, London, Ontario, Canada
- Genre: Indie rock
- Label: Teenage USA

The Two-Minute Miracles chronology
Volume I (1999)	Volume II: Thirteen Songs from the House of Miracles (2001)	Volume III: The Silence of Animals (2003)

Volume II: Thirteen Songs from the House of Miracles is the second album by the Canadian indie rock band The Two-Minute Miracles. It was released in 2001 on Teenage USA Recordings.

== Track listing ==
1. "Why We Seek the Heat of the Wave"
2. "Name That Song"
3. "Slow Down (Porch Mix)"
4. "Meekly Mate"
5. "Mother of the Airwaves"
6. "Like a Forest Ranger"
7. "Rayon Queen in a Nylon Dream"
8. "Low Man on the Lyric Pole"
9. "I Beat Your Heart"
10. "Song for the Weekend Girls"
11. "Eleven Toes"
12. "There's Nothing Like the Glow of a U.F.O."
13. "Slow Down (Meet the Band Mix)"
