= Volume Nine =

Vol. 9 or Volume Nine, or Volume IX, or Volume 9 may refer to:

== Video games ==
- Vol. 9: The Renai Adventure ~Bittersweet Fools~, a videogame

== Music ==
- Volume 9 (Shinhwa album), album of South Korean boy band Shinhwa
- Volume 9, (1940-1941) by Sidney Bechet 2002
- Volume 9, by Point Blank 2014
- Volume 9: I See You Hearin' Me, an album by the Desert Sessions
- Pebbles, Volume 9 (CD)
- Pebbles, Volume 9 (LP)
- Anjunabeats Volume 9
- Dick's Picks Volume 9
