= September Mourning =

American metal band

- Origin: New York City, U.S.
- Genres: Alternative metal
- Years active: 2009–present
- Labels: Repo; Virgin; T-Boy; Sumerian; Mortem Media; INgrooves; Legend
- Members: Emily Lazar; Rich Juzwick; Kyle Mayer; Aaron Hoover
- Past members: James Duran; Nobuaki Hayashi; Steve Podgorski; Xavier Moreux; Josh Fresia; Skot Christ; Shawn Cameron; Tommy Joe Ratliff; Andy DeCicco; Patrick Romanelli; Kyle Ort
- Website: septembermourning.com

September Mourning is an American alternative metal band that incorporates a transmedia dark culture project created by Emily Lazar and Marc Silvestri. The conceptual project was formed by frontwoman, vocalist, and screamer Emily Lazar in New York in 2009. The concept narrative created by Lazar and incorporated in the band and their performances, centers around the fictional story of a human-grim reaper hybrid named September, as she navigates the worlds of the living and the dead. The character's human-side possesses the empathy to give some human souls a second chance. The story is presented on different media platforms, including music, comic books, and live concerts. The comic books are published by Top Cow Productions Image Comics.

== History ==
Marc Silvestri of Top Cow Productions became involved after Lazar pitched the idea of the band to him via Myspace. Together, they developed the world and storyline of September Mourning. Lazar described the project:

"It's a storyline that has a musical component to it. An artistic component to it. The storyline is what holds it all together. The music is like the icing on the cake. It's very important of course, but it's the vehicle to tell the story."

In early 2009, Lazar began focusing on the project's music. Together with guitarist and programmer Chris Egert and guitarist James Duran, Lazar began writing songs and figuring out the sound for September Mourning. Lazar started traveling to Los Angeles in late 2010 and became the only constant member. At the 2010 San Diego Comic-Con, Top Cow Productions announced the creation of Marc Silvestri and September's concept story, September Mourning, whose preview story summary would be published that year in the first edition of their Holiday Special. In late 2011, at San Diego Comic Con, MTV Geek announced a partnership with Marc Silvestri and September to create webisodes based on the characters in the storyline September Mourning, as well as online comics and other media for their website, and David Hine signed on as writer for the series. The unfortunate cancellation of MTV Geek led to the webisodes never coming to fruition.

At the start of 2011, Egert and Lazar began self-producing an album containing the first demo songs written by the band. Melancholia was released on Repo Records exclusively in Germany on May 18, 2012, and features guest drummer Ryan Seaman of Falling in Reverse and bassist Phil Buckman of Filter. The album was mixed and mastered by Dave Ogilvie. On July 17, 2012, a demo of a new song, Before the Fall, co-written and produced by Sahaj Ticotin, and its music video, were featured in the TNA Wrestling commercial for their Hardcore Justice PPV August 2012. This single was released independently to the digital media outlets the following week and showcased the progression of the band's songwriting and move towards a more commercial sound. In September 2013 they played the Schecter Guitars party at the NAMM Show. Lazar continued to develop the look and theatricality of the band and to write new material for the project. They played some one-off shows in the California area while being shopped to labels.

In early 2014 the band was signed to Virgin Records and started writing and recording their US debut. In mid 2014 a new song premiered on CrypticRock called "Superhuman", co-written by Kane Churko. Later that year, the band premiered a new song, "Children of Fate", co-written by Sahaj Ticotin and produced by Howard Benson on Loudwire. Sometime in 2015, their deal with Virgin Records was cut short because of the person that signed them into the label being terminated from his position. On July 12, 2015, September Mourning launched a Kickstarter campaign to fund the release of the first issue of a comic book connected to the project's storyline. The campaign achieved its funding goal in under 72 hours. In September, Loudwire premiered another track from their debut EP, Eye of the Storm. The EP, mixed and produced by Sahaj Ticotin, was released on October 2, 2015, through T-Boy Records.

The comic titled A Murder of Reapers, was released in October 2015 through Top Cow Productions/Image Comics alongside Volume I, the band's first release in the US. The Front Row Report said, "all components of the project's impact present the sensation of strength and vitality. With such a unique method of storytelling and direct communication of passion, September Mourning have set themselves up for success with Volume 1". Live-metal.net stated that "in less than 20 minutes, Volume I establishes September Mourning as one of the few truly unique acts active today. The title implies this is the only beginning, which is a promising, exciting thought."

The band signed to Sumerian Records in March 2016, and released the music video for "Eye of the Storm". The full-length album, Volume II produced by Sahaj Ticotin, was released on July 29, 2016, alongside the second issue of the comic. Lazar stated that "Volume II is a continuation of the first step in our journey which began with our self-released EP, Volume I and A Murder of Reapers, the first issue of our comic book. Volume II follows our hero, September Mourning's tale throughout the second issue of the comic book entitled, The Hand of Fate". To promote the release, an animated lyric video for "Skin and Bones" premiered on Loudwire in July 2016. Later in July the album released, being produced by Sahaj Ticotin and containing 12 tracks. In January 2017 the music video for "20 Below" was released. The song peaked at number 39 on Hot Mainstream Rock Tracks. The final single from the album "'Til You See Heaven" released in August.

In 2018 the band released two new singles "Empire" and "Glass Animals". At some point in 2019 they became independent and began works on their second EP, Volume III. In July the band released the first single off of the EP, "Unholy", accompanied by a music video that was a complication of footage from the band's previous live performances. The second single, "Hiding from Heaven" released in September accompanied with an animated music video representing September Mourning's comic book style. In December, two days before the official release of the EP, the third song was revealed called "Overdose" with its music video. The EP released on December 13, including four tracks. In April 2020 the band released the music video for "Madness".

On October 3, 2020, the song, "Wake the Dead", was announced with the release date of December 11. The song has been confirmed to be the first single from their new album, Volume IV. On December 11 the song released as expected. Their new single "Kill This Love" was announced on January 25 with the release date of February 19, after being teased the day before.

Web3 and NFTs

Beginning in 2021, Emily Lazar expanded the September Mourning project into blockchain-based media, becoming an early adopter of non-fungible tokens (NFTs) within the rock and metal genre. Multiple publications have described Lazar as among the first female rock and metal musicians to mint and sell NFTs, following the release of music- and animation-based digital collectibles tied to the September Mourning narrative universe.

Her early NFT releases combined original music, animation, and narrative storytelling, extending the transmedia scope of the September Mourning project. These works were distributed through platforms including OpenSea, Foundation, Sound.xyz, and Gala Music.

Subsequent projects included generative and utility-based NFT collections such as September’s Monsters, which integrate collectible artwork with access to music, graphic novel content, and fan experiences including live events and merchandise. Additional releases explored programmable and interactive music formats, including stem-based compositions that allow collectors to generate unique variations of songs.

In 2023, Lazar was selected as a recipient of the Avalanche Avaissance Artist Grant, supporting the development of NFT-based creative projects on the Avalanche blockchain.

According to interviews and speaker profiles, Lazar has also presented on blockchain technology and NFTs at institutions and events including Harvard University, NFT.NYC, ETHDenver, and Art Basel.

Lazar was featured in the documentary NFT: WTF?, which explores the rise of NFTs in digital art and music. The film was acquired for distribution by Netflix and released on the service in the United Kingdom in 2024.

== Band members ==
Current

- Emily "September Mourning" Lazar – lead vocals, keyboards (2009–present)
- Rich Juzwick – guitars, backing vocals (2014–present), bass (2018–present)
- Kyle Mayer – drums (2018–present)
- Aaron Hoover – guitars (2020–present)

Former

- Andrew Brown – bass (2009–2012)
- James Duran – guitars, bass (2009–2012)
- Chris Egert – guitars, bass, programming (2009–2012)
- Nobuaki Hayashi – guitars (2012)
- Steve Podgorski – guitars (2012–2013)
- Xavier Moreux – guitars (2014–2015)
- Skot Christ – bass, backing vocals (2012–2013)
- Shawn Cameron – drums (2012–2013)
- Tommy Joe Ratliff – bass (2014–2015)
- Clayton Ryan – bass (2015)
- Jeriah Eager – bass (2015–2016)
- Andy DeCicco – bass (2016–2018)
- Kyle Ort – guitars (2015–2017)
- Josh Fresia – drums (2014–2018)
- Patrick Romanelli – guitars, backing vocals (2017–2020), bass (2018–2020)

Timeline

== Discography ==
=== Studio albums ===
Title	Album details	Peak chart positions	
Title	Album details	US Main.	US Heat.
Melancholia	Released: May 18, 2012; Label: Repo Records; Format: Digital download, CD, LP	—	—
Volume II	Released: July 29, 2016; Label: Sumerian Records; Format: Digital download, CD, LP	20	19
Volume IV	Released: September 1, 2023; Label: Mortem Media; Format: Digital download, CD	—	—

=== EPs ===
Title	Details
Volume I	Released: October 2, 2015; Label: T-Boy Records, Mortem Media; Formats: CD, EP
Volume III	Released: December 13, 2019; Label: Mortem Media; Formats: CD, EP, Digital Download

=== Singles ===
Title	Year	US Main.	Album
"Lost Angels"	2012	—	Melancholia
"Before the Fall"	2012	—	Non-album single
"Stand by Me"	2015	—	Volume I
"Children of Fate"	2015	—	Volume I
"Eye of the Storm"	2016	40	Volume I/Volume II
"Skin and Bones"	2016	—	Volume II
"20 Below"	2017	39	Volume II
"'Til You See Heaven"	2017	—	Volume II
"Empire"	2018	—	Non-album single
"Glass Animals"	2018	—	Non-album single
"Unholy"	2019	—	Volume III
"Hiding from Heaven"	2019	—	Volume III
"Madness"	2019	—	Volume III
"Overdose"	2019	—	Volume III
"Wake The Dead"	2020	—	Volume IV
"Kill This Love"	2021	—	Volume IV
"Falling Awake"	2021	—	Volume IV
"Dirty"	2022	—	Volume IV
"Mausoleum"	2022	—	Volume IV
"Guardian"	2022	—	Volume IV
"Stand Still"	2023	—	Volume IV
"Personally"	2023	—	Volume IV
"Empty	2023	—	Volume IV
"Shiver"	2023	—	Volume IV
"Rise (Oni Force Theme)"	2023	—	Non-album single
"Gravedigger"	2023	—	Non-album single
"Body Count"	2024	—	Non-album single
"Before the Fall MMXXIV"	2024	—	Non-album single
"Spit You Out"	2024	—	Non-album single
"20 Below MMXXIV"	2024	—	Non-album single
"Bitch"	2025	—	Non-album single
"Hell Like Me"	2025	—	Non-album single
"Bite Back"	2025	—	Non-album single
