= Volume (magazine) =

1990s CD-based music magazine

Volume was a magazine in the form of a series of compact disc compilation albums that were published in the UK in the early to mid 1990s. The albums typically contained exclusive tracks and remixes from a diverse range of indie artists. Each album was packaged with a 192-page booklet that contained features on the artists, and original articles. The booklet was the size and shape of a CD jewel case, and was usually packaged with the CD case in a cardboard sleeve. Volume One, the first issue, was published in September 1991. The series came to an end in January 1997, with Volume Seventeen.

== Concept ==
Rob Deacon and Robin Gibson thought up the concept of a CD and complementary book in the early 1990s, but found that publishers were reluctant to invest in it because the shops were full of discount hit compilations, and pressed them to rethink their idea and lower the quality of the book. Gibson was unwilling to do so, having seen similar projects fail because both the CD and publication had to complement each other. They therefore set up their own publishing venture, World's End Ltd. Rob Deacon became Managing Editor and Robin Gibson was Editor. They were based in a "tiny basement flat" in Edith Grove, Kensington; a grant from the Prince's Trust paid for an Apple computer on which the first edition was written.

The booklet contained interviews and bios of the bands and musical artists, with discographies and "favorite tracks" lists. The tone of many of the articles was irreverent, and much of the filler material was humorous. For example, in the Wasted compilation's companion booklet, several short blurbs entitled "The Diary of Dave Stewart's Beard" are written from the perspective of a beard, which pontificates whether it will be shaven, and describes its attempts to hide itself in shame after the poor performance of its owner's latest album. Among the contributors were comedy writers Graham Linehan and Arthur Mathews.

In December 1992, Volume Five was selling for £9.99 each; the Sunday Times noted that it offered "otherwise unavailable tracks by obscure "indie" rock bands inside a smart CD-sized paperback book" and the magazine was making a modest profit. Several double-CD compilations were also released in parallel with the series, including the Trance Europe Express and Trance Atlantic series, a mix release called TEXtures, and two best-of compilations. These special editions were packaged in double-disc jewel cases, in a box with Volume's standard-sized 192-page booklet. The appearance of the first Trance Europe Express was welcomed by the Independent on Sunday as having "style and assurance".

== Later developments ==
Later editions included a CD-ROM, typically with a series of Flash animations and video content. The brand's visual trademark was photographs of tropical fish, with a different species appearing on the cover of each issue. The collective spines laid end to end of Volume One to Volume 10 formed the image of a shark. The artists featured in the magazine ranged widely from indie guitar groups such as Curve, The Wannadies, and Cocteau Twins, to ambient and techno artists such as The Orb and The Shamen and a very early interview with Aphex Twin by John Robb. Other artists and trip hop band Massive Attack, electronic body music group Nitzer Ebb, and hip-hop act Cypress Hill. Electronic music was featured quite heavily. Reviewing Volume Twelve, David Sinclair in The Times described the "beauty of the arrangement" of the magazine as being to introduce the listener/reader to new sounds from bands which had yet to release an album, and with the writing being tempered by knowing the reader will be listening to the sounds being discussed.

In October 1996, with the project celebrating its fifth anniversary, there were 12 people working in its offices. Editions of Volume sold more than 25,000 copies and had been translated into French and Japanese. However, the increased number of magazines with free CDs eventually made the Volume compilations unsustainable and the company closed in 1997.

== Issues ==
- Volume One – September 1991
- Volume Two – November 1991
- Volume Three – May 1992
- Volume Four – August 1992
- Volume Five – December 1992
- Volume Six – April 1993
- Volume Seven – July 1993
- Trance Europe Express – September 1993
- Volume Eight – November 1993
- Volume Nine – March 1994
- Trance Europe Express 2 – May 1994
- Volume Ten – July 1994
- Volume Eleven – August 1994
- Trance Europe Express 3 – October 1994
- Volume Twelve – December 1994
- Trance Atlantic – January 1995
- Volume Thirteen – 1995
- Wasted: The Best of Volume, Part I – 1995
- Sharks Patrol These Waters: The Best of Volume, Part II – May 1995
- Trance Europe Express 4 – July 1995
- Volume Fourteen: Reading 95 – August 1995
- Trance Atlantic 2 – October 1995
- Volume Fifteen – November 1995
- TEXtures – April 1996
- Volume Sixteen – July 1996
- Trance Europe Express 5 – November 1996
- Volume Seventeen – January 1997

The Trance... albums concentrated exclusively on electronic music. Of the two "best of" compilations, Wasted rounded up electronic/dance tracks, while Sharks Patrol These Waters concentrated on guitar-based bands.

A 12" and CD single were also released (without a booklet, though the 12" came with a tropical fish poster) to promote the two "Best Of" compilations. The single contained "Belfast/Wasted" by Orbital from Wasted and "Innocent X" by Therapy? from Sharks Patrol These Waters, both songs taken from Volume Three.
