= Patrick Ballantyne =

Canadian musician

- Born: Windsor, Ontario, Canada
- Genres: Singer-Songwriter, Rock, pop, folk, alt-country, jazz, soul, hard rock
- Occupations: songwriter, guitarist, singer
- Instruments: vocals, guitar, harmonica, banjo
- Years active: 1980–present
- Label: Northwood Music
- Website: patrickballantyne.com

Patrick Ballantyne is a Canadian songwriter, singer and guitarist, best known for co-writing hit songs for Big Sugar, notably "If I Had My Way". He has also released five successful solo albums.

== Life ==
Ballantyne was born in Windsor, ON, where he taught himself to play guitar and began writing songs at age 14. He also grew up with Gordie Johnson. While Johnson went on to found Big Sugar, Ballantyne became a lawyer, beginning as a prosecutor, then moving to senior positions with KPMG, PricewaterhouseCoopers and the Toronto Stock Exchange. He is now the CEO of the Registered Insurance Brokers of Ontario. Throughout his corporate career, however, he simultaneously stayed very active in music.

Ballantyne and Johnson started writing music in the 1980s, when they were still in high school. In 1985, he released his own EP, A Gentleman Lost in the Wild. But he and Johnson continued to write together, and their collaborations appear on all of Big Sugar's albums. Ballantyne also performed on the albums as a vocalist and guitarist.

He has also worked with Colin MacDonald of The Trews, co-writing that band's hit "Poor Ol' Broken Hearted Me", and with Meredith Shaw, Tim Chaisson, and Shaun Verreault of Wide Mouth Mason.

Patrick has performed at the Toronto Centre for the Arts (Meridian Arts Centre) as part of the Bare Bones and Up Front Series.

== Patrick Ballantyne, 2008 ==
In 2008, Ballantyne independently released his debut album, Patrick Ballantyne, which was meant to be a demo tape which he could use to match his songs with artists. Instead, it was cited by music industry executive Ron Harwood as one of the top five independent releases of the year. The Song "No One Came" became the title track of a 2012 album by Country music artist Shane Chisholm.

In 2012, Ballantyne and Tim Chaisson co-wrote two songs, "Beat This Heart" and "Blast Your Way Out", for Chaisson's album The Other Side. At the 2013 East Coast Music Awards, the video for "Beat This Heart" was nominated as the Fan Choice Video of the Year, "Beat This Heart" was nominated as Song of the Year, and the album won Roots/Traditional Solo Recording of the Year.

== Days of Rain, 2014 ==
In June 2014, Ballantyne released his second album, Days of Rain, with a show at the Toronto music store Musideum. The album differs from the first album in that it has more instrumentation (piano and string). The title track, "King of the Road" was co-written with Meredith Shaw and Gordie Johnson. The song originally appeared in a different incarnation on Meredith Shaw's EP "Place Called Happy". The lyric video for "Wrestling with the Devil" was featured by Snob's Music as a 'Friday Find', and 'Music Moment of the Day' by Mute Magazine. In 2014, Ballantyne signed with Northwood Records, which re-released Days of Rain in January 2015. Also in 2014, the readership of NOW Magazine voted Ballantyne Songwriter of the Year.

== Calendar, 2017 ==
In 2015, Ballantyne started the sardonically titled "hitamonth.com" project, aiming to release a single every month for the year. The 12 songs produced were included on his 2017 Album Calendar. J Williamson of No Depression (magazine) wrote of Calendar: "With sounds encompassing everything from pop to Americana to psychedelia, Calendar presents the most well rounded picture of Ballantyne’s skills to date, all tied together by his honest, and often heartbreaking, storytelling ability."

== Sky, 2019 ==
In May 2019, Ballantyne released the album Sky, which premiered on Tinnitist.

== Love / Shadow / Dust, 2021 ==
In April 2021, Ballantyne released the 20-track album Love / Shadow / Dust.

== Discography ==
- A Gentleman Lost in the Wild (1985, EP), Independent
- Patrick Ballantyne (2008), Independent
- Days of Rain (2014), Independent, Northwood Music
- Calendar (2015), Independent, Northwood Music
- Sky (2019), Independent, Northwood Music
- Love / Shadow / Dust (2021), Northwood Music

== Songwriting Credits ==
- Co-writer "Gone For Good", "Empty Head", and "If I Had My Way" - Big Sugar, Hemi-Vision (1996)
- Co-writer "Cop a Plea," "Girl Watcher," "Kickin' Stones" and "Heart Refuse to Pound" - Big Sugar, Heated (1998)
- Co-writer "All Hell for a Basement" - Big Sugar, Brothers and Sisters, Are You Ready? (2001)
- Co-writer "Poor Ol' Broken Hearted Me" - The Trews, Den of Thieves (2005)
- Writer "Rolling Thunder", Co-writer "Ugly Way To Lose", "Religion Of My Own", "Hope Out On That Stage" and "Riding With Delilah" - Mr. Chill, Cold Testament (2005)
- Co-writer "One of These Days" and "Three Legged Race" - Grady, A Cup of Cold Poison (2007)
- Co-writer "If I Was King" and "I'm A Sinner Too" - Grady, Good as Dead (2009)
- Co-writer "So Good", "King of the Road", "There's No Tellin'", "Breakin'", "Happy", Little Fishy", "Acted Badly" and "Girls Who Believe" - Meredith Shaw, Place Called Happy (2011)
- Co-writer "Sweet Little Thing" - Wide Mouth Mason, No Bad Days (2011)
- Writer "No One Came", Co-writer "Love Song for You" and "Living in the Dream/Dreamin' Away" - Shane Chisholm, No One Came (2012)
- Co-writer "Call it a Night" - Meredith Shaw, Trouble (2013)
- Co-writer "Beat This Heart" and "Blast Your Way Out" - Tim Chaisson, The Other Side (2013)
- Co-writer "Slide" - Meredith Shaw, Hardest Goodbye EP (2014)
- Writer "Last Blank Page" - The East Pointers, Secret Victory (2015)

== As producer ==
- Co-producer, Mr. Chill, Cold Testament (2005)

== As Performer ==
- 1992 - Big Sugar, Big Sugar (acoustic guitar, vocals)
- 1993 - Big Sugar, Five Hundred Pounds (acoustic guitar, vocals)
- 1995 - Big Sugar, Dear M.F. (acoustic guitar)
- 1998 - Big Sugar, Heated (vocals)
- 2001 - Big Sugar, Brothers & Sisters, Are You Ready? (vocals)
- 2005 - Mr. Chill – Cold Testament (banjo, acoustic guitar, harmony vocals)

== Film/TV placements ==
- Degrassi: The Next Generation, Season 10E26 (Don't Let Me Get Me), “Girls Who Believe”, performed by Meredith Shaw (2010)
- Arctic Air, Episode 109 (New North), "Sweet Little Thing”, performed by Wide Mouth Mason (2012)
- Heartland, Episode 614 (Lost and Gone Forever), "Til The Sun Comes Up", Co-written and performed by Tim Chaisson (2013)

== Awards and nominations ==
- East Coast Music Association nomination for Song of the Year - “Beat This Heart”, Co-written with Tim Chaisson (2013)
- NOW Magazine Reader's Choice Winner for Songwriter of the Year (2014)
