= The Matador Club =

Former Toronto country music venue

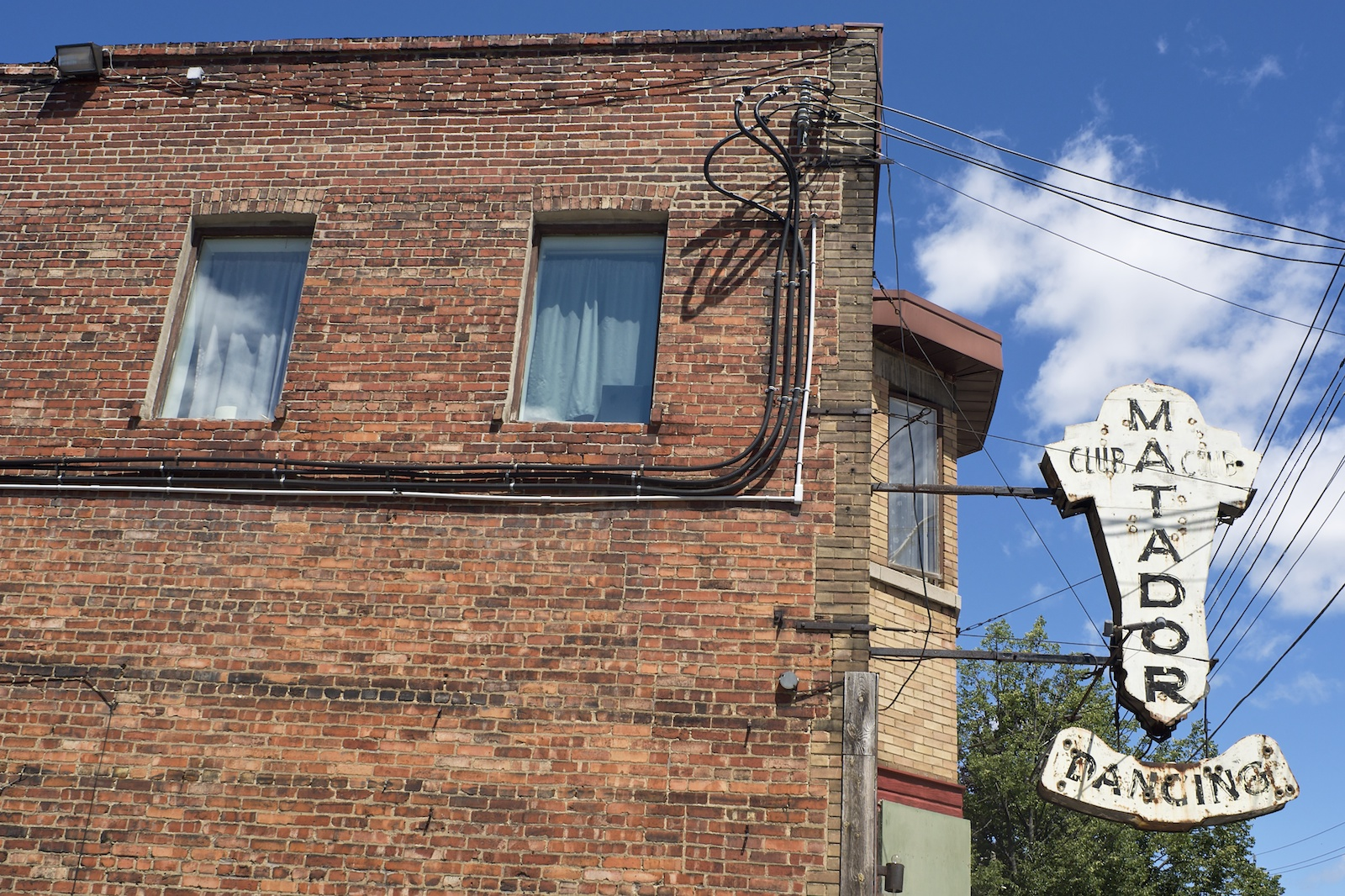
- The Matador Dance Club
- Interactive map of The Matador Club
- Address: 466 Dovercourt Road
- Location: Toronto, Ontario, Canada
- Coordinates: 43.65395°N 79.4267°W
- Owner: Ann Dunn
- Type: Bar
- Event: Country

Construction
- Opened: 1964
- Closed: 2010

The Matador Club was a country music venue in Toronto opened by Ann Dunn in 1964. The exterior of the club, complete with marquee signage, still exists today, though the building itself is currently vacant.

The after-hours dance venue was a hot spot among Torontonians and tourists alike, and was said to be frequented by country notables like Johnny Cash and Loretta Lynn, as well as local celebrities like Leonard Cohen and Catherine O'Hara. While originally a country music venue, by the 1980s the Matador featured a wider variety of music including rock 'n' roll, blues, and rockabilly. During this time the Matador was a busy and popular venue where local and itinerant headliners would regularly drop in to jam after their gigs, treating live music lovers with impromptu performances.

k.d. lang's official music video for "Turn Me Round" (1987) features the Matador sign and street frontage as well as long shots of the stage with its background array of dusty cowboy boots and dozens of signatures.

Big Sugar (band)'s official music video for "Ride Like Hell" (1995) was filmed here by director Eric Yealland and DP Douglas Koch and was nominated for a Much Music Video Award.

The space was a dance hall with an 18-foot ceiling, hardwood floors, a stage, and numerous items of country music memorabilia, such as antlers, cowboy boots, and records. An unlicensed establishment, the Matador Club provided live music every Friday and Saturday night from 1:30am to 5:30am.

The club was described as a "booze can" by the time of its closure on March 1, 2010, when the dance hall was sold.
