= Diggin' a Hole =

1996 single by Big Sugar

Single by Big Sugar

from the album Hemi-Vision
- Released: 1996
- Length: 4:37; 3:45 (edit)
- Label: A&M
- Songwriters: Gordie Johnson; Dan Gallagher; Andy Curran
- Producer: Gordie Johnson

Big Sugar singles chronology
"Dear Mr. Fantasy" (1995)	"Diggin' a Hole" (1996)	"If I Had My Way" (1996)

Music video
- "Diggin' a Hole" on YouTube

"Diggin' a Hole" is a song by Canadian rock band Big Sugar. It was released as the lead single from the band's 1996 album, Hemi-Vision. The song was co-written by Canadian musician Andy Curran and well known Canadian actor and TV host Dan Gallagher. The song was re-released in 1999 on the U.S. version of Big Sugar's next album, Heated. The song was featured on the compilation album Hit Zone 3.

== Commercial performance ==
The song was successful in Canada, reaching No. 9 on the RPM Hit Tracks chart. Between 1995 and 2016, "Diggin' a Hole" was the fifth-most-played song by a Canadian artist on rock radio stations in Canada.

== Track listings ==
UK CD single

1. "Diggin' a Hole" (edit) – 3:45
2. "Tobacco Hand" (dub) – 4:53
3. "Skull Ring" (dub) – 4:54
4. "Joe Lewis / Judgement Day" (Moog dub) – 4:06

Australian CD single

1. "Diggin' a Hole" (remix/edit) – 3:31
2. "Diggin' a Hole" (remix) – 3:53
3. "Diggin' a Hole" (album version) – 4:39
4. "Joe Lewis / Judgement Day" (Moog dub) – 4:06

== Charts ==
Chart (1996)	Peak position
Canada Top Singles (RPM)	9

== Release history ==
Region	Date	Format(s)	Label(s)	Ref.
Canada	1996	Radio	A&M	
United Kingdom	August 4, 1997	CD	Polydor	
