= Big Sugar (disambiguation) =

Big Sugar may refer to

- Big Sugar, a nickname for the sugar industry
- Big Sugar (band), Canadian rock band
  Big Sugar (album), their debut album
- Big Sugar (nickname), baseball player
- Big Sugar, a video game publisher

== See also ==
- Big Sugar Creek
