= Better Get Used to It =

Single by Big Sugar

from the album Heated
- Released: 1998
- Genre: Rock
- Length: 2:55
- Label: A&M
- Songwriter(s): Gavin Brown, Daniel F Gallagher, Gordie Johnson, Brian Wall
- Producer(s): Gordie Johnson

Big Sugar singles chronology
"The Scene" (1998)	"Better Get Used to It" (1998)	"Turn the Lights On" (1999)

Music video
- "Better Get Used To It" on YouTube

"Better Get Used to It" is a song by Canadian rock band Big Sugar. It was released as the second single from the band's 1998 album, Heated. Big Sugar also recorded a French version of the song for the band's 1999 EP, Chauffe à bloc. The band also made a music video of the French version of the song.

== Charts ==
The song was successful in Canada, peaking at #17 on the RPM singles chart. It is the band's only song to have ever charted in the United States, peaking at #26 on the Billboard Heritage Rock chart in 1999.
