= Turn the Lights On =

Turn the Lights On may refer to:

- Turn the Lights On (song), a 1999 song by Big Sugar
- Turn the Lights On (album), a 2015 album by Rico Love
- Turn the Lights On, a song by Natalie Bassingthwaighte, from the album 1000 Stars
- Turn the Lights On, a song by S Club 8, from the album Sundown
