= Meredith Shaw =

Canadian singer, songwriter, radio personality

- Born: December 4, 1981 (age 44)
- Education: Queen's University
- Occupations: radio personality, television personality, singer/songwriter, model
- Years active: 2011-present

Meredith Shaw (born December 4, 1981) is a Canadian radio and television personality, model, body positivity activist, style expert, and singer-songwriter based in Toronto, Ontario. She was the co-host of CityTV's Breakfast Television from 2023 to 2025.

== Background ==
Shaw was born and raised in Toronto. Her parents were both lawyers, and her mother was the Dean of Osgoode Hall Law School. As a child, she took piano, guitar, and voice lessons. She attended Branksome Hall in Toronto. She went on to study opera and theatre arts at Queen's University in Kingston.

== Career ==
=== Music, radio, and modeling ===
Shaw's first professional break as a singer-songwriter came when Gordie Johnson of the band Big Sugar heard her singing and took her under his wing. Soon, it was agreed that Johnson would produce Shaw's debut album. He took her down to Willie Nelson's Pedernales studio in Austin, Texas to record.

The album, Place Called Happy, was released in 2011. Gordie Johnson took Shaw on tour with Big Sugar that same year. Every night of the tour, Johnson brought Shaw on stage for a mash-up of her single "Acted Badly" and Big Sugar's "Turn The Lights On."

The last song on Place Called Happy is called "Girls Who Believe," and it is a song that has taken on a life of its own subsequent to the album's release. It was featured in an episode of the TV show Degrassi: The Next Generation and spawned a community-based initiative called Girls Who Believe, spearheaded by Shaw, which began in 2012 as a series of workshops for girls aged 11 to 17 that ranged in topics from music and creativity to self-esteem. Shaw, along with sponsor Slaight Music, created the "Girls Who Believe Fest" featuring an all-female lineup (the 2013 fest included Meredith Shaw, Molly Thomas, and Ladies of the Canyon), female media personalities, and female-run businesses showcased in an onsite marketplace. The funds raised from the fest go towards the non-profit organization Girls Inc.

Also in 2011, Shaw was hired by Boom 97.3, a radio station in Toronto. During her time at Boom as a weekend host, she interviewed artists, ranging from Serena Ryder and The Spoons to Gordie Johnson and JD Fortune (INXS). She has introduced concerts by The Beach Boys, Platinum Blonde, and Anjulie. In November 2014, Meredith moved up the dial from Boom 97.3 to her new radio home, CHUM 104.5, an iHeartRadio station. She was heard hosting the afternoon drive show from 3 pm to 6 pm weekdays, and on Sundays 11 am to 1 pm for The Back in the Day Brunch.

In 2012, she was signed to the Ben Barry Agency in Toronto, and is currently on the roster at B&M Model Management. Shaw has appeared in campaigns for Hudson’s Bay, Penningtons, Walmart, and Eloquii, among many others, and has participated regularly in Toronto Fashion Week. She has been on the cover of magazines, including Dare Magazine, a Canadian plus-size fashion publication.

=== Television and body positivity ===
Shaw is frequently seen on Canadian television, appearing regularly as a style expert on CTV's The Marilyn Denis Show, The Social, etalk, and Your Morning, promoting diversity in the fashion industry and speaking on particular behalf of the body positivity movement, encouraging girls and women of all sizes and shapes to feel confident, powerful, and attractive. She has worked closely in this regard with a variety of Canadian initiatives, including Girls Inc., Girl Talk, and Shoppers’ Drug Mart’s “Love You Run For Women."

In 2016, Shaw started an inclusive style column for Canadian Living magazine.

In 2020, during the COVID-19 lockdown, Shaw began posting a filmed-at-home cooking show with her partner, Rodney Bowers, a Toronto-based chef, on Instagram Live, for her Back in the Day Brunch radio show. Before long she received a call from CTV, offering some higher-end production equipment so that they could produce the show for television. The show, called Double Your Dish, airs Sunday evenings on CTV. Shaw sees the show as a breakthrough of sorts. “It’s pretty cool to have a cooking show with two people in bigger bodies because I don’t think you see that very much,” she told the Toronto Star in July 2020.

In 2020, during the COVID-19 lockdown, Shaw began co-hosting etalk's live Twitter aftershow for Canada's Drag Race alongside Traci Melchor, averaging 1.4 million viewers total over the course of the 10-week run.

On September 5, 2023, Shaw joined CityTV's Breakfast Television as the new co-host, replacing Dina Pugliese. In January 2024 she also announced a new weekend radio show, The Feel Good Brunch, to air on Citytv's co-owned CHFI-FM and other adult contemporary radio stations owned by Rogers Radio across Canada. Shaw's departure from BT was announced on February 10, 2025.

== Discography ==
=== Albums ===
- Place Called Happy (2011)

=== EPs ===
- Trouble (2013) (eOne Music Canada)
- Hardest Goodbye (2014) (eOne Music Canada)

=== Singles ===
- "Acted Badly Remix featuring DJ Friendlyness (2012) – Written by Meredith Shaw, Patrick Ballantyne, DJ Friendlyness. Produced by Gordie Johnson.
- "Trouble (Soul Proprietor Reheat) (2013) – Written by Meredith Shaw and Joel Plaskett. Produced by Eon Sinclair (Soul Proprietor, Bedouin Soundclash).

=== Songwriting and collaborations ===
- Co-writer, "Little Bit A Alright" (Big Sugar) (RPM, 2012)
- Co-writer, "Come A Little Closer" (Big Sugar) (RPM, 2012)
- Co-writer, "There's No Tellin" (Big Sugar) (RPM, 2012)
- Album artwork designer, I Was Just Trying to Help (Sit Down Servant) (2012)
- Backing vocals, RPM (Big Sugar) (2012 Bread & Butter Productions)
- Co-writer, "Take it All Away" (Andy Brown) (Tin Man, 2013)
