= The Road Ahead =

The Road Ahead may refer to:

- The Road Ahead (album), 2004, by Bradley Joseph
- The Road Ahead (magazine), published by the Royal Automobile Club of Queensland, Australia
- The Road Ahead: America's Creeping Revolution, a 1949 book by John T. Flynn
- The Road Ahead (Gates book), a 1995 book by Bill Gates
- The Road Ahead (song), the Singapore National Day Parade's theme song for 2021

== See also ==
- "Roads Ahead", a 2011 single by Canadian rock band Big Sugar
