= The Scene (song) =

Single by Big Sugar

from the album Heated
- Released: 1998
- Genre: Rock
- Length: 4:32; 4:15 (Radio edit)
- Label: A&M (CAN); Capricorn Records (U.S.)
- Songwriter(s): Gordie Johnson, David Wall, Andrew Whiteman
- Producer(s): Gordie Johnson

Big Sugar singles chronology
"Opem Up Baby" (1997)	"The Scene" (1998)	"Better Get Used to It" (1998)

Music video
- "The Scene" on YouTube

"The Scene" is the first single from Canadian rock band Big Sugar's 1998 album, Heated. The song was very successful in Canada, reaching #1 on Canada's Alternative chart. The song was ranked #98 on MuchMore's Top 100 Big Tunes of The 90s.

== Music video ==
The music video for "The Scene" was directed by Andrew MacNaughtan. The video features Gordie Johnson riding a scooter down Burlington Street in Hamilton and the band performing in a boxing ring. The video was nominated for "Best Video" at the 2000 Juno Awards.

== Charts ==
Year	Peak Chart Position	
Year	CAN	CAN Alt.
1998	36	1
