= Los Arys =

Argentine blogger

- Other names: Ariel Dieguez & Ariel Medeiro
- Occupations: fashion bloggers, photographers, and stylists
- Years active: 2011 to present
- Website: losarys.com/en/

Ariel Dieguez and Ariel Medeiro are fashion bloggers, photographers, and stylists who are best known by the moniker Los Arys. The duo received the 2016 Influence Award from MTV and Los 40 Principales.

Los Arys was formed by Argentinian's Ariel Dieguez and Ariel Medeiro. In 2011, the two combined their social media popularity to promote their work real-time on Facebook and through the website LosArys.com. Los Arys grew into an influencer platform where Dieguez and Medeiro blogged about food, clothes, and placed they visited. They two became brand ambassadors for Christian Louboutin.
