= Colepaugh =

Colepaugh is a surname. Notable people with the surname include:

- Chris Colepaugh, Canadian blues-rock musician
- William Colepaugh (1918–2005), American spy and defector to Nazi Germany
