= Sweet Mama =

Studio album by The Respectables
- Released: April 28, 2009
- Genre: Rock
- Label: Universal Music Canada, DEP, Sphere Musique
- Producer: Gordie Johnson

Sweet Mama is the sixth full-length album by Canadian rock band The Respectables. It was released in 2009 by Universal Music Canada.

The first single from this album was "Sugar" feat. Gordie Johnson, and it was followed by "Sweet Mama".

== Track listing ==
1. "Serves You Right"
2. "Sweet Mama"
3. "Got More Than I Wanted from Honky Tonkin' and Rock 'N' Roll"
4. "Sugar" (Featuring Gordie Johnson)
5. "Tell Me Who"
6. "Say Yes, Say No"
7. "Telephone Call"
8. "Rain Down"
9. "Quick as Thieves"
10. "Devil in the Launderette "
