= If I Had My Way =

If I Had My Way may refer to:

- If I Had My Way, song from 1914 written by James Kendis and Lou Klein, performed by Ethel Green
- Samson and Delilah (traditional song), a traditional song, also recorded as "If I Had My Way I'd Tear the Building Down"/"Oh Lord If I Had My Way" by Blind Willie Johnson in 1927
- If I Had My Way (film), a 1940 musical comedy film directed by David Butler and starring Bing Crosby and Gloria Jean
- If I Had My Way (song), a 1996 single by Big Sugar
- If I Had My Way (album), a 1997 album by Nancy Wilson
