= Gilles Valiquette =

Canadian rock musician

- Born: April 7, 1952 (age 74); Montreal, Quebec, Canada
- Genres: Rock
- Occupations: Singer, songwriter, stage actor, record producer
- Instrument: Guitar
- Website: www.gillesvaliquette.com

Gilles Valiquette (born April 7, 1952 in Montreal, Quebec) is a Canadian rock musician, stage actor and record producer.

== Career ==
After studying music at Lionel-Groulx College and Cégep Saint-Laurent in Montreal, Valiquette first emerged with the rock group Someone, with whom he recorded two singles. He subsequently became a supporting musician for Les Séguin and Jacques Michel, before releasing his first solo album, Chansons pour un café, in 1972.

In 1980, he played the role of Roger Roger in the musical Starmania at Montreal's Comédie nationale. He subsequently launched his own recording studio, and has produced albums for Jim Corcoran, Bertrand Gosselin, Plume Latraverse, Daniel Lavoie, Robert Paquette, Gilles Rivard and Richard Séguin. He largely stopped recording new material after this time.

His 1973 hit "Je suis cool" was covered by Big Sugar on their 1999 EP Chauffe à bloc.

== Discography ==
=== Studio albums ===
- Chansons pour un café (1972)
- Deuxième Arrêt (1973)
- Du même nom (1975)
- Soirées d'automne (1975)
- Valiquette est en ville (1976)
- Vol de nuit (1978)
- Valiquette (1980)
- Pièces (1993)
- Secrètement public (2007)

=== Compilations ===
- 1972-1975 (1976)
- Où est passé le temps? (1992)
- Demandes spéciales (1994)
- Pour l'occasion (2006)
- Les 9 premiers (2008)
