= Chris Brown and Kate Fenner =

Folk rock music duo

- Origin: New York City, U.S.
- Genres: Folk rock
- Years active: 1996–2005
- Spinoff of: Bourbon Tabernacle Choir
- Members: Chris Brown, Kate Fenner
- Website: chrisandkate.com

Chris Brown and Kate Fenner were a folk rock duo, consisting of vocalist Kate Fenner and multi-instrumentalist Chris Brown, who were active from 1996 to 2005. Although based primarily in New York City, both Brown and Fenner are Canadians and the group remained intimately connected to the Canadian music scene.

== History ==
Brown and Fenner were founding members of the Canadian alternative rock group Bourbon Tabernacle Choir in the 1980s. That band moved to New York City following their 1995 album Shy Folk in an attempt to break into the larger American market, but broke up soon afterward, with most members returning home to Toronto. Brown and Fenner opted to stay in New York City, and continued writing and performing as a duo.

They released their debut album Other People's Heavens in 1997, and toured extensively in the United States as an opening act for Ani DiFranco and in Canada as an opening act for Weeping Tile. Brown also spent some time as a supporting musician in Barenaked Ladies, during Kevin Hearn's hiatus from the band for cancer treatment; he and Fenner simultaneously played some dates together as an opener for Barenaked Ladies during that tour.

They then released Geronimo in 1999, and supported the album with further touring both on their own and as an opening act for The Tragically Hip's Music @ Work tour in 2000, also participating as supporting musicians in the Hip's headlining sets. During that tour, they also performed some separate live club dates during which they recorded the live album Great Lakes Bootleg, which was released in December 2000.

They recorded their next album, 2001's O Witness, at The Tragically Hip's Bathouse Recording Studio. In the same year Brown organized the compilation album GASCD, which featured musical and spoken word tracks as a fundraiser to cover the legal costs of the anti-globalization activists who had been arrested at the Quebec City Summit of the Americas earlier in the year. The album included Brown and Fenner's own song "How You Gonna Bring Your Children to God?" In 2001 and 2002, Brown and Fenner played a number of concert dates to promote the album and raise additional funds, along with artists including Bruce Cockburn, Sarah Harmer, Jason Collett, Barenaked Ladies and Rheostatics, and activist speakers including Maude Barlow and Naomi Klein.

In 2003 they released Songs, a two-CD rerelease of the by then out of print Other People's Heavens and Geronimo, along with a non-album track, "Resist War", which was distributed as a free Internet download. At the same time, Brown and Fenner each released solo albums, although their tour to support the albums was still undertaken as a duo. They released their sixth and final album as a duo, Go On, in 2004.

Following Go On they stopped recording under the Chris Brown and Kate Fenner name, instead each pursuing solo careers, although they continued to collaborate on each other's recordings and in live performances. In 2005 they were commissioned to write "Chansons du Salamandre", a song cycle supporting Mystery on Fifth Avenue project; the song "Salamandre" was covered by Sarah Harmer on her album I'm a Mountain.

== Discography ==
- Other People's Heavens – 1997
- Geronimo – 1999
- Great Lakes Bootleg – 2000
- O Witness – 2001
- Songs – 2003
- Go On – 2004
