= Hugh Christopher Brown =

Canadian singer-songwriter and multi-instrumentalist

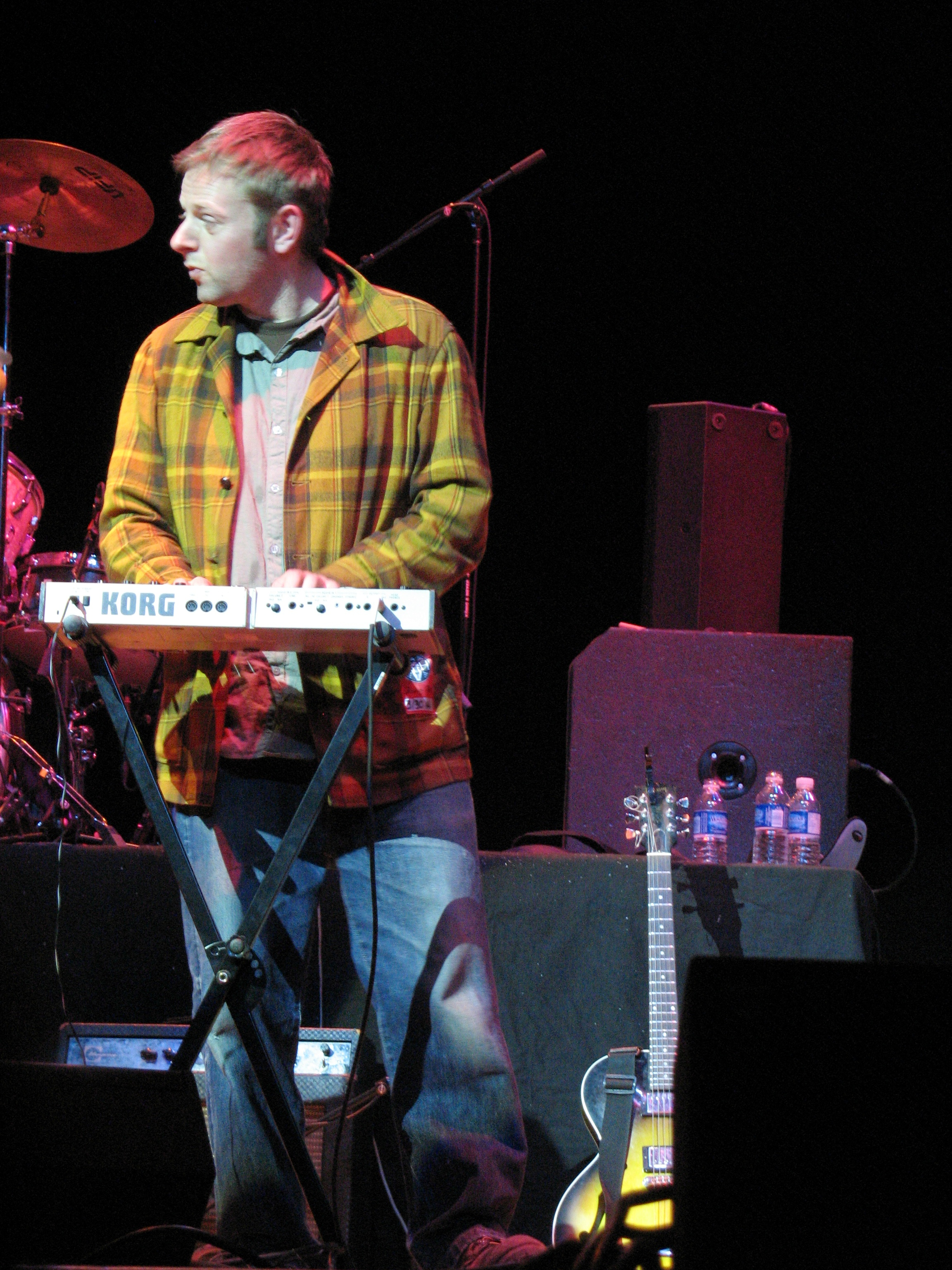
- Brown performing with the Rheostatics at Massey Hall in Toronto, 2007

Background information
- Born: May 17; Toronto, Canada
- Genres: Folk rock; alternative rock
- Occupation: Musician
- Instruments: Piano, keyboards, guitar
- Years active: 1985–present
- Website: wolfeislandrecords.com/hughchristopherbrown/

Hugh Christopher Brown, formerly known as Chris Brown, is a Canadian singer-songwriter and multi-instrumentalist.

== Early life ==
Brown was born and raised in Toronto, Canada. He lived in New York City for a while before settling in Wolfe Island, Ontario.

== Career ==
Brown was one of the primary singers and songwriters for the alternative rock band Bourbon Tabernacle Choir in the 1980s and 1990s. When that band broke up, he continued performing as a duo with his Bourbon bandmate Kate Fenner. Brown has accompanied dozens of notable musicians on stage, including a six-month stint as a member of Barenaked Ladies in 1998 filling in for Kevin Hearn while Hearn battled leukemia.

Brown released a solo album, Burden of Belief, in 2003. He performs this material both solo and with Tony Scherr, Anton Fier, and Teddy Kumpel as Chris Brown and the Citizens' Band. The group's album Oblivion was released in 2007.

Also in 2007, musical contributions from Brown were included on Salamandre, the soundtrack for architectural designer Eric Clough's Mystery on Fifth Avenue apartment renovation project. Along with Fenner, he composed original music: four melodies of inspiration through four centuries of music, including Renaissance, classical, Victorian, a Venetian waltz, jazz, ragtime, blues, folk, and funk.

He is also a social justice activist and the founder of the Pros and Cons Program bringing recording arts to prisons and creating musical works for charities. The Pros and Cons Program has become internationally recognized as groundbreaking in fields of restorative justice and inmate mentorship, with the support of The David Rockefeller Fund. Brown recorded an album with the prisoners called Postcards from the County which Exclaim! described as "inescapably honest and sincere".

Brown has recently launched Wolfe Island Records as a home for the prison music and the many artists he produces and collaborates with Kate Fenner, Suzanne Jarvie, David Corley, One River, The Mermaids, Hadley McCall Thackston and the Stephen Stanley Band. In 2017 he released a new solo album Pacem. PopMatters premiered his first single, "Keeper of the Flame", and Huffington Post raved that "Pacem is one of those albums that works on the listener from the inside out."

Brown currently releases music on Wolfe Island where he tours solo and performs with local musicians in the band Open Hearts Society.

== Discography ==
Hugh Christopher Brown Pacem - 2017

=== Chris Brown ===
- Burden of Belief – 2003

=== Chris Brown and the Citizens' Band ===
- Oblivion – 2007

=== Chris Brown and Kate Fenner ===
- Other People's Heavens – 1997
- Geronimo – 1999
- Great Lakes Bootleg – 2000
- O Witness – 2001
- Songs – 2003
- Go On – 2004

=== Bourbon Tabernacle Choir ===
- First Taste of Bourbon – 1987
- If Hell Had a Houseband – 1989
- Sister Anthony – 1990
- Superior Cackling Hen – 1992
- Shy Folk – 1995
- Simply the Best 1985–1995 – 2000

=== Contributions to other artists' albums ===
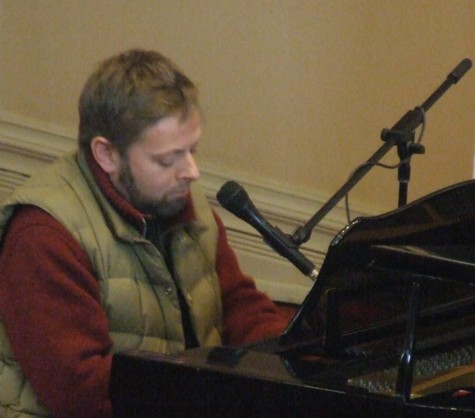
Chris Brown playing piano

- Ani DiFranco – Out of Range
- Ashley MacIsaac – Hi™ How Are You Today?
- Barenaked Ladies – Gordon, Born on a Pirate Ship
- Big Sugar – Five Hundred Pounds
- Crash Test Dummies – I Don't Care That You Don't Mind, Jingle All the Way, Puss 'n' Boots, Songs of the Unforgiven
- Christian Doscher – Go Where You're Loved
- DJ Logic – The Zen of Logic
- Hadley McCall Thackston - Hadley McCall Thackston
- Hermine Deurloo – Crazy Clock
- Jason Collett – Idols of Exile
- Rosanna Goodman – My Old Man ("Yellow Coat" and, with Kate Fenner, "The Ballad of Penny Evans")
- Jesse Harris and the Ferdinandos – The Secret Sun
- Kate Fenner – Horses and Burning Cars
- Teddy Kumpel – Songs in Tomato Sauce
- Luther Wright and the Wrongs – Rebuild the Wall, Guitar Pickin' Martyrs
- Natasha Alexandra (NLX) – Behind Your Back
- One River (Michael Quattrone) – One River (co-producer, musician)
- Po' Girl – Vagabond Lullabies
- Propagandhi – Potemkin City Limits
- Rheostatics – Whale Music, Introducing Happiness
- The Tragically Hip – Music @ Work
- Tom Jones – Burning Down The House
- Tony Scherr – Come Around, Twist in the Wind
- Rod Alonzo – Cyclists (co-producer, arranger, keyboards)

=== Compilations ===
- GASCD
- We Want Peace On Earth
- Bridge to Music – Indie Sounds From Brooklyn's Underground
- My Old Man: A Tribute to Steve Goodman
