= Les Respectables =

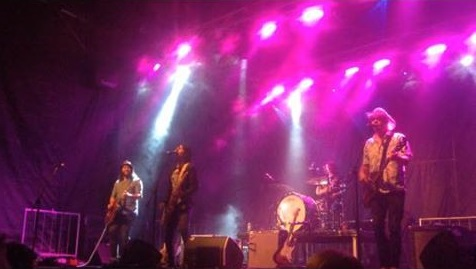
- Live concert at Vaudreuil-Dorion, Quebec, Canada.

Background information
- Origin: Quebec City, Quebec, Canada
- Genres: Rock
- Years active: 1991–present
- Labels: Passeport; Universal (2008–present)
- Members: Sébastien Plante (lead vocals); Stéphane Dussault (bass); Stéphane Beaudin (drums); Jean-Sebastien Chouinard aka "Johnny Flash" (lead guitar)
- Past members: Pascal Dufour
- Website: www.respectables.ca

Les Respectables is a Canadian rock band that was founded in Quebec City in 1991.

== Biography ==
=== 1992–1998 ===
In 1992, Les Respectables won first place in a competition run by Montreal radio station, CHOM-FM, and the band also reached the grand final of Yamaha Music's "Sunfest" held in Gimli, Manitoba, Canada. Les Respectables subsequently released their first album, entitled No Dogs, No Band, in 1993. Despite an exhausting promotional tour, the success of the album remains modest. The group made a resurgence in 1997 with Full Regalia, a second full-length effort that was considered more mature, with a greater degree of nuance present in the songwriting.

=== 1999 ===
In 1999, the band released its first album with the Record label, : Les Disques Passeport, $ = happiness (also known by its French title, "$ = bonheur"). The first single release from the album, "L'homme 7 Up", gained the band a considerable level of attention and the 7 Up company eventually purchased the rights to the song for advertising purposes. Subsequent single releases, "Amalgame", "Plaisir", and "Holà décadence" received heavy rotation on commercial radio that carried over into the next decade. The band then completed a tour of Quebec and a sixth single release, "L'argent fait le bonheur" (Money Is Happiness), reached the top placement in the music charts and remained in this position for over two months.

=== 2000–2006 ===
In this time period the band received various awards and tackled the production of a fourth album, Quadrosonic, produced in collaboration with Gordie Johnson, former member of the Canadian band Big Sugar. In January 2003, opening for the Rolling Stones at the Bell Centre in Montreal, Les Respectables played a well-received set.

=== 2007 ===
On May 23, 2007, the band celebrated 15 years with the release of the DVD, Les Respectables 15th Anniversary, Live at the Bell Center. Over 5,000 copies were sold. Les Respectables played on stage at the Salle Wilfrid-Pelletier Center of Arts, along with the Montreal Symphony Orchestra, while providing another memorable performance.

=== 2008–2009 ===
The group continued to go on tour in Quebec. In 2009, The Great Sweet Mama, the band's new album, was produced and co-written by Gordie Johnson, "Big Sugar"'s former front man. It was their first English album in ten years. Keyboardist, Ian McLagan (The Rolling Stones, The Faces), also lent his talent on several songs. The Great Sweet Mama was recorded in part at Willie Nelson's Pedernales Studios in Texas, US, and Mixart Studios in Montreal.

== Discography ==
=== Albums ===
Release date	Title	Label
1993	No Dogs, No Bands.	
1996	Full Regalia	
1998	The B-sides: 7 years of sucking in the nineties	
September, 1999	$ = bonheur	Les Disques Passeport
January 1, 2002	QuadroSonic	Les Disques Passeport
2005	Le monde à l'envers	Sphere Music
2006	Live au Centre Bell double CD	Sphere Music
2008	Le Best Of Les Respectables Depuis 1991	Sphere Music
April 28, 2009	Sweet Mama	Sphere Music, Universal Music Canada, DEP
2010	Guacamole	Sphere Music, Universal Music Canada, DEP

=== Singles ===
- "Sugar" feat. Gordie Johnson – 2009
- "Sweet Mama" – 2009
- "Cette fille" – 2014
