= Kate Fenner =

Canadian musician

- Origin: Toronto, Ontario, Canada
- Genres: Folk rock
- Instrument: Singer
- Years active: 1985–present
- Labels: UFO Music
- Website: www.katefennermusic.com

Kate Fenner is a Canadian musician, currently based in New York City. The New York Times describes her vocal stylings as having a "lusty, alternative, Joni Mitchell-ish sound." She was one of the primary singers and songwriters for the Canadian alternative rock band Bourbon Tabernacle Choir in the 1980s and 1990s. After its dissolution, Fenner continued performing as a duo with her former Bourbon bandmate Chris Brown. In 2000, she toured and sang with Canadian rock band The Tragically Hip on the "Music @ Work" tour. Fenner released a solo album, Horses and Burning Cars, in 2003, followed by her second solo album, Magnet, produced by Chris Brown.

While a member of the Bourbon Tabernacle Choir, she performed the singing voice of Marnie McPhail's character in the drama film The Circle Game.

Fenner's music was also featured on the soundtrack for the Mystery on Fifth Avenue Apartment project by the New York City architecture firm 212box. Salamandre, co-written by her and Brown, was built around four melodies of inspiration through four centuries of music, including renaissance, classical, Victorian, a Venetian waltz, jazz, ragtime, blues, folk, and funk. Salamandre was commissioned and curated as part of the "Mystery On Fifth Avenue" by architectural designer Eric Clough. The song was also covered by Sarah Harmer on her 2005 album I'm a Mountain.

In December 2004, through January 2005, Fenner was invited to be the opening act for blues artist B.B. King on a tour through the American South, and at Foxwoods Casino in Connecticut and BB King's in New York City, performing a 30-minute set.

At this time, Fenner also began to sing in several performance pieces for the visual artist Joan Jonas, among them "The Shape, the Scent, the Feel of Things" (originally commissioned by the Dia Beacon and subsequently performed around the world (Berlin, São Paulo), "Reading Dante", and "They Come to Us Without a Word", which premiered at the Venice Biennale in 2015.

In November 2017, she released a third solo album, Middle Voice, followed with some performances. Fenner recorded it with long-time musical collaborator Tony Scherr. Musical contributors to the recording include Bill Frisell, Jason Moran, Norah Jones, Chris Brown, and Tony Scherr.

== Discography ==
=== Kate Fenner ===
- Horses and Burning Cars (2003)
- Magnet (2007)
- Middle Voice (2017)
- Dead Reckoning (2023)

=== Chris Brown and Kate Fenner ===
- Other People's Heavens (1997)
- Geronimo (1999)
- Great Lakes Bootleg (2000)
- O Witness (2001)
- Songs (2003)
- Go On (2004)
- Salamandre – Soundtrack for "Mystery on Fifth Avenue" (2008)

=== With Bourbon Tabernacle Choir ===
- A First Taste of Bourbon (1985)
- If Hell Had a Houseband (1987)
- Sister Anthony (1990)
- Superior Cackling Hen (1992)
- Shy Folk (1995)
- Simply the Best 1985–1995 (2000)

=== Contributions ===
- Chris Brown – Burden of Belief (2003)
- Chris Brown and the Citizens Band – Oblivion (2007)
- Pros and Cons Program – Postcards from the County (2014)
