= Eric Clough =

American architect

- Born: September 7, 1972 (age 53); Peoria, Illinois, U.S.
- Education: Washington University in St. Louis; Yale University
- Occupation: Architect
- Practice: 212box

Eric Clough (born September 7, 1972) is an American architectural designer.

== Career and work ==
Eric was born in Peoria, Illinois. He attended Peoria Notre Dame High School. Due to his father's international assignment, Clough spent his formative years in Brussels and London at the International School of Brussels and the American School of London. He received a Bachelor of Arts in Architecture from the School of Architecture at Washington University in St. Louis, followed by earning his Master of Architecture from Yale University. Of his design sensibilities, The New York Times said, "[Clough's] ideas about space and domestic living derive more from Buckminster Fuller than Peter Marino."

Clough founded 212box, an architecture and design firm, in 2001. As of 2012, they were based in Manhattan's Financial District with an office adjacent to the World Trade Center / 9/11 Memorial site. The multi-disciplinary firm specializes in architecture, real estate, product design, film and graphic design.

Among Clough's earliest projects was the GlassBox (1999), a construction that would expand billboards into livable, leasable spaces. By utilizing Transparent Imaging Matrix technology on the floors and walls, the GlassBox was a dynamic billboard for advertising and informational purposes, and its interior space could be used for office, residence, retail, or storage. It was intended to take maximum advantage of under-used space in dense urban areas, such as above paid parking lots in New York City.

212box's clients for architecture and interior design have included, in the residential sector, Philip Roth and Tatiana von Fürstenberg, and in retail, shoe designer Christian Louboutin. Clough spoke about his design work at the IDEA Conference in 2009.

=== Christian Louboutin ===
212box first designed boutiques for Christian Louboutin in 2004. In 2003, Clough was highly recommended to Louboutin by Diane von Furstenberg, inciting Louboutin to sign on with 212box almost immediately. Since then, 212box has collaborated on nearly 50 Louboutin boutiques worldwide. By November 2011, locations included Sydney, Brasília, Dubai, Las Vegas, Paris, Seoul, Ho Chi Minh City, Shanghai, and Copenhagen.

For the São Paulo boutique, Clough took literally Louboutin's desire to create a "new language" for the store's design, aiming to counteract the sense of placelessness that shopping malls usually conjure by tapping into the human relationship with language and symbol. Clough covered the façade of the São Paulo store with more than 9,000 non-repeating wooden tiles containing letters from more than 28 world languages, as well as 400 symbols drawn by his twelve-year-old nephew. Since the opening of the São Paulo store, these character tiles, which would come to be called CodeBox tiles, have become a signature aspect of 212box's design in Louboutin stores. The Dubai Mall Louboutin store, which opened in July 2011, featured a wall of ceramic CodeBox tiles containing hidden poems. The Ho Chi Minh City boutique (opened in Fall 2011) contains CodeBox tiles of both wood and ceramic, and further language tiles made of backlit brass and etched with poetry by native Vietnamese poets. As Interior Design notes, "a fondness for literature runs through the oeuvre of 212box."

212box's Louboutin flagship store in Miami's Design District doubled as an art installation referencing the city's art culture. Wallpaper described its exterior: "The outside wall planted with orchids, and inside multicoloured hosiery is strung up like an erotic spiderweb in an installation by artist Madeleine Berkhemer across the entrance hall. Here, one-way mirrors allow voyeurs to watch women try on the famous red-soled shoes as they lounge on luxurious patchwork furniture by Bokja." The New York City showroom garnered praise for "achieving authenticity and charm through the use of salvaged and collected materials," including wrought-iron gates, antique furniture, and stained glass panels.

=== The "Mystery On Fifth Avenue" apartment ===
In 2004, Clough and 212box took on the renovation of a 4,200-square-foot, 1920s co-op with views of Central Park, originally owned by Marjorie Merriweather Post and E.F. Hutton. The new-owners, Maureen Sherry and Steven Klinsky, are Wall Street financial experts and purchased the apartment in 2003 for $8.5 million. They hired Clough to renovate, and as a surprise for the family's four young children, he built into the apartment an elaborate "scavenger hunt" comprising 18 clues implanted into the fabric of the rooms. The puzzles involve ciphers and riddles to secret compartments, a narrative tracing inspiration through 40 historical figures, and a soundtrack featuring original music by Canadian folk musicians Kate Fenner and Chris Brown. J. J. Abrams paid six figures for the film rights to a New York Times article about the apartment entitled "Mystery on Fifth Avenue."

After Abrams bought the rights to the article, Clough left him a response in the form of an encrypted message, which was meant to be pointed out to Abrams via another The New York Times article, "Monumentally Mystifying: Power of Secrets Inspires Public Art".

=== The Houston Penthouse ===
In 2019, Clough and 212box were commissioned to create a 6,000-square-foot penthouse apartment, in the River Oaks section of Houston, in collaboration with over 50 artists and artisans. The project is detailed in an article in 1stDibs magazine.

== Personal life ==
Clough is married to Canadian folk singer Kate Fenner and has one son
