= Dear M.F. =

EP by Big Sugar
- Released: September 22, 1995
- Recorded: Metalworks, Toronto
- Genres: Blues rock, alternative rock
- Length: 25:46
- Label: Hypnotic Records
- Producers: Gordie Johnson; Peter Prilesnik

Big Sugar chronology
Five Hundred Pounds (1993)	Dear M.F. (1995)	Ride Like Hell (1995)

Professional ratings
Review scores
Source	Rating
Allmusic	3.5/5 stars

Dear M.F. is an EP album by Canadian rock band Big Sugar. It was released in 1995 on Hypnotic Records.

== Track listing ==
- "Dear Mr. Fantasy" – (Chris Wood, Jim Capaldi, Steve Winwood) — 5:05
- "Goodbye Train" – (Gordie Johnson) — 4:45
- "Motherless Children" – (traditional, arranged by Gordie Johnson) – 4:18
- "A Night in Tunisia" – (Dizzy Gillespie, Frankie Paparelli) — 4:02
- "Leadbelly (Dub)" – (Johnson, Garry Lowe, Kelly Hoppe, Stich Wynston) – 7:36

== Personnel ==
- Gordie Johnson — guitars, bass, vocals
- Patrick Ballantyne – acoustic guitar
- Kelly Hoppe – harmonica, melodica, steel guitar
- Garry Lowe – bass
- Al Cross – drums
- Stich Wynston – drums

== Year-end charts ==
Chart (2001)	Position
Canada (Nielsen SoundScan)	107
