= Chauffe à bloc =

Chauffé à bloc

EP by Big Sugar
- Released: July 27, 1999
- Venues: Phase One; Hardcore Productions; Opium Den
- Genres: Blues rock, rock
- Label: A&M
- Producer: Gordie Johnson

Big Sugar chronology
| Heated (1998) | Chauffé à bloc (1999) | Extra Long Life (2000) |

Chauffé à bloc is an EP by Canadian rock band Big Sugar, released on July 27, 1999. The title translates literally to "Block Heating" in English and is similar to the expression "All Heated Up."

In 1996, Big Sugar decided to record a French language version of the single "Open Up Baby", from the album Hemi-Vision, for radio airplay in Quebec. The experiment was successful, and following the released of 1998's Heated, the band recorded a French rendition of each single released from that album, as well as a French-only cover of Gilles Valiquette's 1973 hit "Je suis cool".

Chauffé à bloc collects all five of the French songs. For their next album, 2001's Brothers and Sisters, Are You Ready?, the band recorded the entire album in both English and French, and simultaneously released both versions as separate albums. The French recording was titled Brothers and Sisters, Êtes Vous Ready?.

== Track listing ==
1. "(Pas) Envie d'allumer"
2. "Je suis cool"
3. "C'est moi qui règne"
4. "Better Get Used to it (Version Française)"
5. "Ouvres-toi bébé"
