= Roads Ahead =

2011 single by Big Sugar

Single by Big Sugar

from the album Revolution Per Minute
- Released: June 13, 2011
- Genre: Rock
- Length: 2:21
- Label: Bread & Water Records/Fontana North
- Songwriter(s): Richard Munro Hope, Gordie Johnson, Paul John Kehayas, Adrian William Mack, Christopher Jay Read
- Producer(s): Gordie Johnson

Big Sugar singles chronology
| "I Want You Now" (2003) | "Roads Ahead" (2011) | "Little Bit A All Right" (2011) |

Music video
- Roads Ahead on YouTube

"Roads Ahead" is the first single from Canadian rock band Big Sugar's 2011 album, Revolution Per Minute. The song is Big Sugar's first single since reuniting in 2010 and their first single released since 2003.

== Music video ==
The music video for "Roads Ahead" was filmed in the band's dressing room before a show at a festival in Lloydminster. The video was directed, edited and produced by Gordie Johnson.
