= Revolution per Minute =

Revolution Per Minute

Studio album by Big Sugar
- Released: June 28, 2011
- Recorded: September – October 2010 at Phase One Studios, Toronto, Ontario, Canada
- Genre: Blues rock, reggae fusion, alternative rock
- Length: 48:48
- Label: Bread & Water Records/Fontana North
- Producer: Gordie Johnson, Jacob Sciba

Big Sugar chronology
Hit & Run (2003)	Revolution Per Minute (2011)	Yard Style (2014)

Singles from Revolution Per Minute
- 1. "Roads Ahead" Released: June 13, 2011; 2. "Little Bit A All Right" Released: 2011

Revolution Per Minute is the sixth studio album by Canadian rock band Big Sugar and the band's first album released since reuniting in 2010. The album debuted at #34 on the Canadian Albums Chart.

== Track listing ==
1. Roads Ahead - 2:21
2. Come A Little Closer … Now Come! - 4:30
3. Little Bit A All Right - 4:03
4. It’s All I Know - 5:20
5. If I Were Heaven (Tonight) - 4:17
6. Done So Much In The Dark - 4:03
7. Work It Now! - 3:14
8. Un-Employed Expert - 3:40
9. Counterfeit Wings (Are Some Jive Ass Wings) - 4:21
10. There’s No Tellin’ Me - 4:33
11. True Believers - 3:23
12. A Revolution Per Minute - 5:07
13. Devil in The Launderette (iTunes bonus track) - 3:12
14. Insatiable (iTunes bonus track) - 3:52
