= Ride Like Hell =

EP by Big Sugar
- Released: February 27, 1995
- Genre: Blues rock
- Label: Hypnotic
- Producer: Gordie Johnson; Peter Prilesnik

Big Sugar chronology
Dear M.F. (1995)	Ride Like Hell (1995)	Hemi-Vision (1996)

Ride Like Hell is an EP album by Canadian rock band Big Sugar. It was released in 1995 on Hypnotic Records.

== Track listing ==
1. "Ride Like Hell"
2. "Dear Mr. Fantasy"
3. "I'm a Ram"
4. "Burning Bush (Ram Dub)"
5. "Cass Corridor (Ram Chroma Dub)"
