= Turn the Lights On (song) =

Single by Big Sugar

from the album Heated
- Released: 1999
- Genre: Reggae fusion, alternative rock
- Length: 3:54
- Label: A&M
- Songwriter(s): Garry Lowe, Gordie Johnson
- Producer(s): Gordie Johnson

Big Sugar singles chronology
"Better Get Used to It" (1998)	"Turn the Lights On" (1999)	"Girl Watcher" (1999)

Music video
- "Turn the Lights On" on YouTube

"Turn the Lights On" is the third single released from Big Sugar's 1998 album, Heated. The song was successful in Canada, peaking at No. 8 on the RPM Rock chart. It is one of the band's signature songs.
