= Extra Long Life =

Studio album by Alkaline
- Released: May 29, 2000
- Genre: Dub
- Label: Universal
- Producer: Gordie Johnson

Big Sugar chronology
Chauffe à bloc (1999)	Extra Long Life (2000)	Brothers and Sisters, Are You Ready? (2001)

Extra Long Life is an album by Alkaline, a dub music side project of the Canadian rock band Big Sugar and reggae singer Whitey Don. The album was released in 2000 on Universal Records. Most of the album's tracks are reworked versions of past Big Sugar songs.

== Track listing ==
1. "Headlights"
2. "Maximum Judgement/Brown Bomber"
3. "Tief Da Bike"
4. "'Nuff Sugar"
5. "Set Around"
6. "Strictly Got To **ill"
7. "Deliverance"
8. "Maximum Version"
9. "Listen Johnny Thompson"
10. "Rambo"
11. "Skull Dubbery"
12. "Alka Lights"
