= Hemi-Vision =

Studio album by Big Sugar
- Released: September 29, 1996
- Studios: Presence Studios, Phase One Studios
- Genres: Blues, rock
- Length: 66:59
- Label: A&M
- Producer: Gordie Johnson

Big Sugar chronology
Ride Like Hell (1995)	Hemi-Vision (1996)	Heated (1998)

Professional ratings
Review scores
Source	Rating
AllMusic	3/5 stars
Edmonton Journal	4/5 stars

Hemi-Vision is the third album by Canadian blues-rock band Big Sugar. The album was nominated for Best Rock Album at the 1997 Juno Awards.

The singles from the album were "Diggin' a Hole", "If I Had My Way", "Gone For Good", and "Opem Up Baby". The band also recorded a French language version of "Opem Up Baby", entitled "Ouvres-toi Bébé", for radio airplay in Quebec (see also Chauffe à bloc).

== Background ==
The album was recorded in six weeks at Presence Studios and Phase One Studios. According to Gordie Johnson, this was the first album that the band had recorded with an adequate budget, having $65,000 (CAD) at their disposal. Johnson collaborated with several other songwriters for this album. "Gone for Good", "Empty Head", and "If I Had My Way" were co-written with Patrick Ballantyne; "La Stralla" and "Skull King" with Andrew Whiteman; "Tired All The Time" with bandmate Kelly Hoppe; "Opem Up Baby" with Dan Gallagher; "Tommy Johnson" with Dave Wall; and "Diggin' a Hole" with Gallagher and Andy Curran.

== 25th Anniversary Deluxe Edition ==
On September 25, 2020, the band released a 25th anniversary deluxe edition of the album.

== Track listing ==
1. "Diggin' a Hole" – 4:37
2. "Gone for Good" – 4:43
3. "If I Had My Way" – 5:13
4. "Skull Ring" – 4:25
5. "Joe Louis / Judgement Day" – 8:58
6. "Tommy Johnson" – 4:12
7. "La Stralla" – 4:17
8. "Tired All the Time" – 4:27
9. "Empty Head" – 5:13
10. "Opem Up Baby"^{1} – 5:13
11. "Rolling Pin" – 6:46
12. "Tobacco Hand" – 8:55

2020 Deluxe Edition
13. "Gone for Good" (Early version)
14. "Gone for Good" (Lost take)
15. "Judgement Day" (Dub mix)
16. "Diggin' a Hole" (Acoustic version)
17. "Baby's in Black"
18. "Tommy Johnson" (Dub mix)

== Personnel ==
=== Big Sugar ===
- Gordie Johnson - guitar, vocals, bass
- Kelly Hoppe - harmonica, keyboards
- Garry Lowe - bass
- Paul Brennan - drums

=== Guests ===
- Ashley MacIssac - fiddle
- Al Cross - drums
- Matt DeMatteo - drums

== Notes ==
^{1} This track was labelled as "Opem Up Baby" on the CD cover, although both the lyrics and the French version, titled "Ouvres-toi bébé", indicate that the intended meaning was "open". It is not known if this was a spelling error on the cover art or an intentional use of artistic license, but both "Opem" and "Open" have been cited as the song's title by different reference works. The band's own website, however, uses the "opem" spelling, as does the 2003 greatest hits compilation Hit & Run, lending credence to the idea that it was intentional.
