= Double Your Dish =

Canadian television show

Double Your Dish is a Canadian television cooking show, which premiered on CTV Life Channel in 2020. Hosted by broadcaster Meredith Shaw and chef Rodney Bowers, the series focuses on helping families to simplify cooking time and extend their food budgets by centering each episode around a core ingredient that can be turned into two different meals at the same time.

The series had its genesis when Shaw and Bowers responded to the initial lockdowns associated with the COVID-19 pandemic in Canada by streaming live cooking videos on Instagram. After one of their cooking sessions was also broadcast on Shaw's Back in the Day Brunch Sunday morning show on CHUM-FM, CTV Life contacted her to offer the couple a show. The program was shot entirely in the couple's own home, with Shaw herself taking on many of the production tasks such as lighting, filming and styling. Shaw has also stated that because Bowers is the chef of the family while she is far less skilled in the kitchen, their dynamic helps to make the show more engaging for viewers because she needs to ask many of the same questions about food preparation that the viewing audience would need to ask.

The show has also been hailed as a significant advance for body positivity in food television, as Bowers and Shaw are larger-framed and had both previously been rejected for television hosting gigs because of their size.

The series premiered on June 29, 2020, and ran for eight episodes throughout the summer. In December 2020, the show returned with two Christmas-themed specials.

Natalie Lambert received a Canadian Screen Award nomination for Best Direction in a Lifestyle or Information Program or Series at the 9th Canadian Screen Awards in 2021, for the episode "No Leftover Gets Left Behind!"
