= If I Had My Way (song) =

Single by Big Sugar

from the album Hemi-Vision
- Released: December 1996
- Genre: Blues rock, alternative rock
- Length: 5:13; 4:30 (Radio edit)
- Label: A&M
- Songwriters: Gordie Johnson, Patrick Ballantyne
- Producer: Gordie Johnson

Big Sugar singles chronology
"Diggin' a Hole" (1996)	"If I Had My Way" (1996)	"Gone For Good" (1997)

Music video
- "If I Had My Way" on YouTube

"If I Had My Way" is the second single from Canadian rock band Big Sugar's 1996 album, Hemi-Vision.

== Charts ==
=== Weekly charts ===
Chart (1997)	Peak position
Canadian RPM Singles Chart	13
Canadian RPM Alternative 30	11

=== Year-end charts ===
Chart (1997)	Position
Canada Top Singles (RPM)	81
