= Christian Louboutin =

French fashion designer (born 1964)

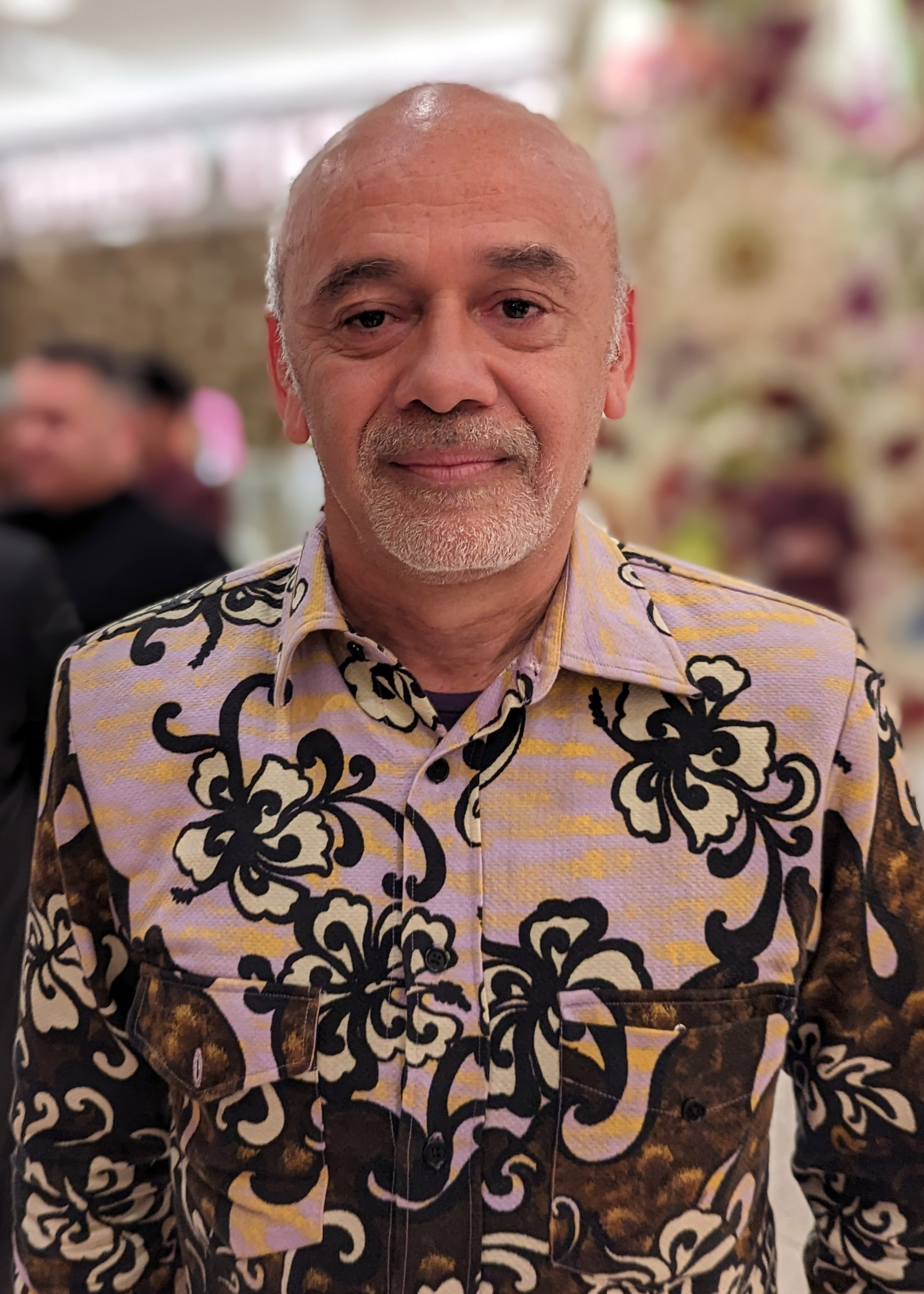
- Louboutin in 2023
- Born: 7 January 1964 (age 62); Paris, France
- Occupation: Fashion designer
- Years active: 1991–present

Christian Louboutin S.A.
- Type: Private, S.A.
- Industry: Luxury goods
- Founded: 1991
- Founder: Christian Louboutin; Henri Seydoux; Bruno Chamberland and Faheema Moosa
- Headquarters: Paris, France
- Key people: Christian Louboutin, co-founder; Bruno Chamberland, co-founder and CEO; Henri Seydoux, co-founder and director; Alexis Mourot, COO and GM; Jaden Smith, creative director
- Products: Shoes, purses, wallets, cosmetics, fragrances, etc
- Revenue: ▲$250 million (31 December 2010)
- Owner: Exor N.V. (24%)
- Number of employees: 1,800 (2024)
- Website: christianlouboutin.com

Christian Louboutin (French: [kʁistjɑ̃ lubutɛ̃]; born 7 January 1964) is a French fashion designer. His stiletto footwear incorporates shiny, red-lacquered soles that have become his signature. Initially a freelance designer for fashion houses, he started his shoe salon in Paris, with his shoes finding favour with celebrity clientele. He has partnered with other organizations for projects including limited edition pieces, gallery exhibits, and a custom bar. His company has since branched out into men's luxury footwear, ladies's handbags, fragrances, and makeup.

== Early life ==
Louboutin was born and raised in Paris's 12th arrondissement. He was the only son of Roger, a cabinet-maker, and Irene, a homemaker from Brittany. He had three sisters. Louboutin said in a 2012 interview that he was "much darker-skinned than everyone else in my family. You know, I felt like I wasn't French. My family was very French and so I decided they had probably adopted me. But instead of feeling it was terrible and that I was an outsider who had to go and find my real family, I invented my own history, full of characters from Egypt, because I was very into the pharaohs." He discovered that he had Egyptian heritage from his biological father, who had been in a secret relationship with his mother Irene, as revealed by one of his sisters in 2014.

Louboutin was expelled from school three times and then he decided to run away from home at the age of 12, at which point his mother allowed him to move out to live at a friend's house. He faced much opposition when he decided to drop out from school. However, he claims that what helped him make up his mind was an interview on TV with Sophia Loren, in which she introduced her sister. She stated that she had to leave school when she was only 12, but got her degree when she was 50. He later remarked, "Everybody applauded! And I thought, Well, at least if I regret it I'm going to be like the sister of Sophia Loren!"

As a preteen he was one of the "Bande Du Palace", a group of hard-partying teens and preteens that included Eva Ionesco, who was a fixture of the Parisian nightclub Le Palace.

== Career ==
Louboutin's passion for designing shoes started at a young age, overshadowing his interest in academics and leading him towards a successful career in fashion. Going through a punk phase, he was in a few films, including the 1979 cult classic Race d'ep and The Homosexual Century, which attracted an English-language audience. His first job was at the Folies Bergère, the cabaret where he assisted the entertainers backstage. He was also a fixture on the city's party scene alongside Mick Jagger and Andy Warhol.

Fascinated by world cultures, he ran away in his teens to Egypt and also spent a year in India. Louboutin returned to Paris in 1981, where he assembled a portfolio of drawings of elaborate high heels. He brought it to the top couture houses. The effort resulted in employment with Charles Jourdan. Subsequently, Louboutin met Roger Vivier, who invented the modern stiletto, or spiked-heel shoe, and the chrome-plated buckle pump. Louboutin became an apprentice in Vivier's atelier, Roger Vivier.

Going on to serve as a freelance designer, Louboutin designed women's shoes for Chanel, Yves Saint Laurent and Maud Frizon. In the late 1980s, he turned away from fashion, to become a landscape gardener and to contribute to Vogue but missed working with shoes and set up his company in 1991.

With funds from two backers, he opened a Paris shoe salon in 1991, with Princess Caroline of Monaco as his first customer. She complimented the store one day when a fashion journalist was present; the journalist's subsequent publication of Princess' comments helped greatly to increase Louboutin's renown. Clients such as Diane von Fürstenberg and Catherine Deneuve followed. Later, those interested in his stiletto heels have included Christina Aguilera, Joan Collins, Jennifer Lopez, Shirley Coates, Madonna, Tina Turner, Marion Cotillard, Nicki Minaj, Gwyneth Paltrow and Blake Lively. Sarah Jessica Parker wore a pair of shoes by Louboutin, for her wedding. Britney Spears wears a pair of high-heeled Louboutins in her music video "If U Seek Amy" that were not available for sale until a month after the video was released.

Louboutin topped the Luxury Institute's annual Luxury Brand Status Index (LBSI) for three years; the brand's offerings were declared the Most Prestigious Women's Shoes in 2007, 2008 and 2009. By 2011, Louboutin became the most searched-for shoe brand online.

The Couture Council of the Museum at the Fashion Institute of Technology honoured Louboutin with its 2019 Couture Council Award for Artistry of Fashion in New York City, on 4 September 2019.

In February 2020, Christian Louboutin had an exhibition in Paris celebrating the 30th-anniversary of Christian Louboutin Ltd.

== Personal life ==
Landscape architect Louis Benech has been Louboutin's partner since 1999. The two divide their time among homes in the 1st arrondissement of Paris, a fisherman's cottage in Lisbon, Portugal, a house in Melides, Portugal, a house in Comporta, Portugal, a palace in Aleppo, a houseboat on the Nile christened Dahabibi-my love boat, and a house in Luxor. The Luxor house is a former craftsman's workshop, made of compressed earthen bricks, to which he has added an additional floor and a rooftop belvedere. Louboutin also shares a 13th-century castle in the Vendée with his business partner Bruno Chamberlain.

Louboutin is Léa Seydoux's godfather.

== Shoes ==
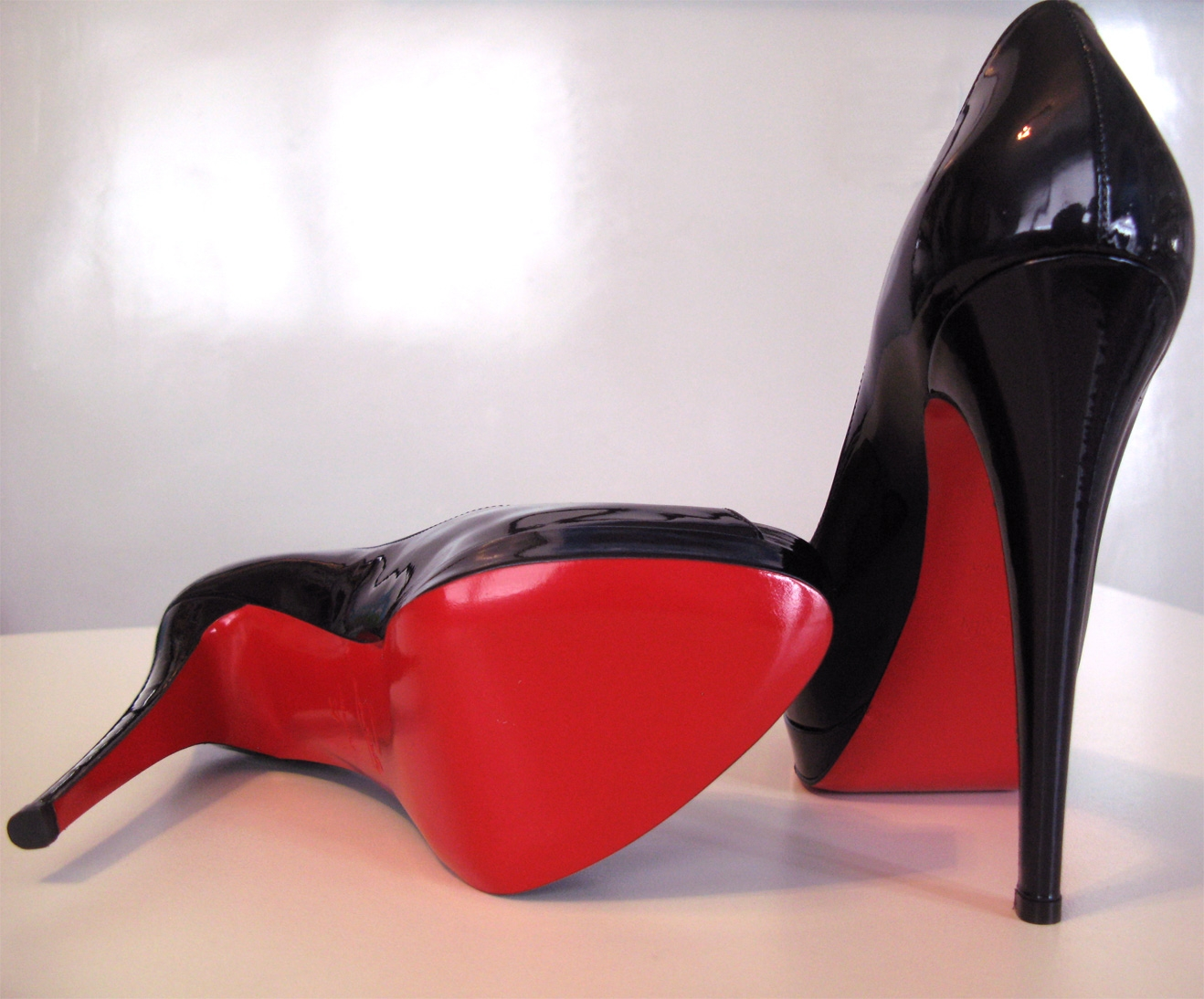
An example of Louboutin's signature red-bottoms

Louboutin helped bring stilettos back into fashion in the 1990s and 2000s, designing dozens of styles with heel heights of 120 mm (4.72 inches) and higher. The designer's professed goal has been to "make a woman look sexy, beautiful, to make her legs look as long as [he] can". While he does offer some lower-heeled styles, Louboutin is generally associated with dressier evening-wear designs incorporating jewelled straps, bows, feathers, patent leather, red soles and other decorative touches. He is most popularly known for the red leather soles on his high-heeled shoes.

The first pair of red-soled Louboutin shoes were created in either 1992 or 1993, when Louboutin used an assistant's red nail polish to add red to a pair with black soles.

Christian Louboutin's red-bottom colour code is Pantone 18-1663 TPX.

His single biggest client is American novelist Danielle Steel, who is reputed to own over 6,000 pairs and is known to have purchased up to 80 pairs at a time when shopping at his stores.

=== Trademark litigation ===
The red sole is protected as a trademark in several countries, and litigation has taken place in various disputes in which Louboutin claimed infringement of its rights. Litigation generally also involved discussion of the validity or the scope of protection of the trademark.

==== Belgium – Louboutin vs. Dr. Adams Footwear ====
In 2013, Louboutin filed a trademark infringement claim of the Benelux trademark against Dr. Adams. The Court of First Instance of Brussels declared the trademark however invalid. That decision was overturned by the Brussels Court of Appeal, who forbade the sale of shoes with a red sole by Dr. Adams.

==== France – Louboutin vs. Zara ====
In France, the trademark of Louboutin was held valid, but not infringed by Zara. The Court of Appeal however considered the French trademark invalid. The latter decision was upheld by the French Supreme Court in 2012.

==== Netherlands – Louboutin vs. Van Haren ====
In 2012, in The Netherlands, Louboutin initiated litigation, based also on the Benelux trademark, against shoe retailer Van Haren, seeking to stop it from selling the red-soled shoe "5th Avenue by Halle Berry". The District Court of The Hague proposed in 2015 to ask preliminary questions to the European Court of Justice that it considered necessary in order to determine whether the trademark would be valid. In June 2018, the European Court of Justice ruled that a trademark of a colour to be placed on a sole could be valid. Based on this decision, the Court of The Hague decided the trademark was valid, and Van Haren was infringing.

==== United States – Christian Louboutin vs. Yves Saint Laurent ====
In 2011, Christian Louboutin company filed a US trademark infringement claim of its red-soled shoes against designer Yves Saint Laurent. The firm expected that the YSL shoe design would be revoked and sought US$1 million in damages. However, in August 2011, U.S. District Judge Victor Marrero denied the firm's request to stop the sale of women's shoes with red soles by Yves Saint Laurent. The judge questioned the validity of the trademark, writing, "Louboutin's claim would cast a red cloud over the whole industry, cramping what other designers do, while allowing Louboutin to paint with a full palette." In his thirty-two-page decision, Judge Marrero compared fashion designers to painters and noted how creativity for both is dependent upon using color as "an indispensable medium" that "plays a unique role." The Court observed that: "The law should not countenance restraints that would interfere with creativity and stifle competition by one designer, while granting another a monopoly invested with the right to exclude use of an ornamental or functional medium necessary for freest and most productive artistic expression by all engaged in the same enterprise." Jewelry company Tiffany & Co., which has its blue box trademarked, filed an amicus curiae brief supporting the right to trademark a color.

In September 2012, the court finally ruled that Louboutin retains the exclusive right to use the color red on the bottom of its shoes whenever the outer portion of the shoe is any color besides red, while Yves Saint Laurent can continue to sell its shoes with red soles as long as the whole shoe is red. The YSL monochromatic shoe – red upper, red outsole – over which the lawsuit originally had been brought and against which Louboutin had tried and failed to get a preliminary injunction, therefore won't infringe the trimmed-down trademark.

==== Switzerland – Christian Louboutin vs. Eidgenössisches Institut für Geistiges Eigentum (IGE) ====
The Swiss Federal Institute of Intellectual Property rejected Louboutin's trademark's extension to Switzerland in 2011, considering the trademark invalid. The Swiss Federal Supreme Court confirmed the invalidity of the trademark in Switzerland in February 2017.

== Turnover and prices ==
In his first year of business, Louboutin sold 200 pairs of shoes. It has since become an internationally recognized brand. The United States accounts for 52 per cent of Louboutin's sales, while Europe, the Middle East and Russia account for 30 per cent and Asia the remaining 18 per cent. Of the firm's $300 million in annual revenue, 95% comes from shoes, with the remainder derived from purses and handbags. They expect the volume of handbags to eventually represent 20% of their annual sales.

In 2009, wholesale purchases represented 88% of the business. Overseas, the company has partnered with Pedder Group of Hong Kong for distribution in their Asian markets and the Chalhoub Group of the United Arab Emirates for their representation in the Middle East.

As of March 2012, Louboutin employed 420 shoemakers (referred to as Loubi's Angels). The footwear is manufactured and produced exclusively at his factory in Milan. He also maintains a small atelier on Rue Jean-Jacques Rousseau, for private customers and one-of-a-kind creations.

Louboutins can sell from $700 and up, with crystal-encrusted pairs exceeding $6,000. The base price for a custom-made pair of Louboutin is $4,000. If the style already exists, it is standard price plus 30%.

== Brand extensions ==
In 2012, Louboutin said that over the previous decade he had been offered licensing deals on everything from cars and glasses to swimwear and ready-to-wear, but turned them down as he does not want his name to be one that can be licensed. In 2003, his first extension outside of shoes was the introduction of his handbags and purses line.

In 2011, he launched a collection of men's footwear at a new exclusive store in Paris. Two explanations were given why Louboutin started a men's line. The first was a story of a French woman who asked him to make her a pair of shoes for her very large feet. He custom-created the size 13 1/2 shoes for her, but she didn't end up buying them. Instead, he passed them along to a friend who gave them to her husband. The second story was that the idea of starting a men's line came from musician Mika, who asked Louboutin to design all the shoes for his show for his tour. He also noticed, "There is a group of men that is thinking a little bit more like women. They're super-excited to buy the 'new thing.' I've noticed on blogs, for example, that men are very serious about their shoes now. They treat shoes very much as objects, as collectors' items. Of course, there is still a group that is more conservative in their tastes. They like to pass their shoes down to their son or say they have had a pair for 25 years". A unique feature introduced was the Tattoo Parlor, where customers could have digital photos taken of their tattoos and embroidered onto their shoes or, embroider the signature brogues in addition to selecting designs by Christian Louboutin with prices starting at around $8,000.

In 2012, Louboutin partnered with Batallure Beauty LLC to launch Christian Louboutin Beauté to enter the luxury beauty market. Catherine Roggero is the New York-based general manager for Christian Louboutin, a venture between Christian Louboutin SAS and Batallure Beauty. Roggero "will be responsible for developing Louboutin's beauty business."

On 23 July 2014, Christian Louboutin Beauté launched a range of nail lacquers, exclusively debuting the signature red shade, Rouge Louboutin, at the Saks Fifth Avenue flagship store in New York and its 15 US boutiques. In support of this launch, the high-end department store created Loubiville, a five-window visual merchandising display. The range was more widely distributed on 6 August 2014 to Bergdorf Goodman, Neiman Marcus, Nordstrom, and select Sephora boutiques. The product is a logical brand extension, as an assistant's nail polish was the impetus for the shoes' red soles. Much like the shoes, the polish is receiving attention for its provocative shape, a long spiky cap, designed to resemble a calligrapher's brush or a spire.

In 2015, he expanded his foray into cosmetics with a lipstick collection. The tube was inspired by Babylonian architecture and Middle Eastern antiquities. As of 2017, the brand had 38 shades, divided into three collections.

Louboutin entered the fragrance market in 2016 with the release of three parfums: Bikini Questa Sera, with jasmine and tuberose notes, Tornade Blonde, with rose and cassis notes, and Trouble in Heaven, with patchouli and amber notes. The bottles were designed by Thomas Heatherwick's studio.

Christian Louboutin invested in the hotel industry in Portugal, starting with Vermelho hotel (meaning Red hotel in Portuguese) like his iconic red soles, that opened on April 1, 2023. Christian Louboutin opened two new hotel villas in Portugal's Alentejo: La Salvada and La Maison des Bateaux, that are an extension of Vermelho hotel, in July 2025. Louboutin is now planning to open a second boutique hotel in the same region in 2026, that will be called Vermelho Lagoa (meaning Red Lagoon).

== Projects ==
In 2007, he collaborated with the filmmaker David Lynch on Fetish, an exhibition of his shoes in Lynch's photographs as erotic sculptural objects including ballet pumps made vertical by an impossible heel, or shoes with heels projecting inches beyond the sole (Viennese heel). He partnered once again with Lynch and Swizz Beats to compose music when Louboutin directed a show at the Crazy Horse, called Feu, which ran from 5 March to 31 May 2012.

In conjunction with Bergdorf Goodman, he held a competition for design students at the Parsons New School for Design who graduated in 2010 and 2011, encouraging them to create apparel inspired by Louboutin's silhouettes of the past two decades, as well as the brand's new capsule collection.

In 2012, he was commissioned by Disney to create a modern-day Cinderella-inspired pair of slippers limited to just 20 pieces, to complement release of the Cinderella: Diamond Edition Blu-ray Combo Pack in the fall. Louboutin also appears in a Disney-produced 10-minute short called The Magic of the Glass Slipper: A Cinderella Story, a bonus feature on the Cinderella Blu-ray DVD. He also partnered with Mattel that same year to create a limited edition "Louboutin Barbie". The first in the series was a cat burglar themed Barbie, which retailed for $150 and sold out the first day.

Louboutin was also one of the judges at the Martini Royale Casting Party to find the new face of the drinks brand.

In 2013, Louboutin was celebrated at Toronto's Design Exchange with a comprehensive exhibit featuring themes of showgirls, fetish, construction and travel.

In 2020, Louboutin created a digitalized Loubi World platform whereby guests can create an avatar with facial recognition technology and choose a variety of shoes and accessories. Louboutin designed the virtual space so that the avatars can interact with virtual locales and landmarks.

In March 2021, Louboutin sold a 25% stake to Exor for $643 million.

== Stores ==
In the spring of 2012, the company opened its first men's store in New York City, with over 93 square metres (1,000 square feet) of space and located next to its existing Horatio Street store. From previous experience in his Paris store, Louboutin claimed that women feel uncomfortable when men stare at them while they try on shoes, hence the separate stores.

The first Louboutin Men's Boutique, Christian Louboutin Boutique Homme on Rue Jean-Jacques Rousseau in Paris, opened in the summer of 2012.

Christian Louboutin Miami is located on 40th Street in the Design District of Miami, Florida. Louboutin chose to open a store in Miami because of the mix of businesses, the small urban scale, and his obvious following there. During Miami Basel art fair when the store opened in 2009, he said, "You don't get this with Europeans—but Americans actually come into my office in Paris to meet me, and a lot of those people are from Miami." The boutique stocks Louboutin's most colorful, strappy, precarious styles, on account of the subtropical climate and the fact that, Louboutin says, "people barely walk in the street."

The 2,400-square-foot space was designed by Eric Clough and 212box. Above a steel awning shaped like a Louboutin shoe in profile, with a red underside to boot, pink orchids sprout from the coral-stone facade. Still more orchids project from a wall in the entry gallery. Dutch artist Madeleine Berkhemer recycled pantyhose into a multi-colored sculpture that stretches over the empty concrete floor with some of Louboutin's shoes dangling in the overhead tangle of nylon "like insects trapped in a psychedelic spider's web." This L-shaped space wraps two sides of a rectangular volume clad almost entirely in a one-way mirror: a box that contains the merchandise for sale while allowing people who've just come in the front door to "witness other people falling in love with the shoes," Clough says.

The inside areas in the store are defined by red carpeting. Blue, blown-glass chandeliers hang from the ceilings. Hieroglyphics, symbols and Braille are carved onto wooden Codebox Tiles that line some of the store's interior walls, hiding the words of a poem by contemporary American poet Lyn Hejinian in plain sight, in the etched wooden tiles lining the gallery wall behind the orchids. "This is the way I / Want to go in and / Out of heaven... / Windows full at 5pm / My skull a place / Except that I think of space as the more exciting," the lines read. These coded tiles appear in many Louboutin stores designed by Clough around the world, including São Paulo, Brazil.

== Counterfeiting ==
Louboutin's website sells some of their products online, and contains a statement that it is the only legitimate online source with the word Louboutin in the domain name to do so. Legitimate Louboutin shoes can be purchased in-store and online from retailers such as Harrods, Harvey Nichols, and Selfridges in the UK. Saks Fifth Avenue, Neiman Marcus, and Bergdorf Goodman sell genuine Louboutin in the US. In Canada, Christian Louboutin shoes are available from Holt Renfrew and Davids.

Online, counterfeit Louboutin shoes are available. In the last few years, the company has served hundreds of DMCA notices on Google to remove many sites selling fake goods from their search results.

The company set up a separate website focused on protecting the brand and detailing more than 3,000 websites that sell fake goods, many of which have been closed down.

== Filmography ==
- 1985: La Nuit Porte Jarretelles by Virginie Thévenet
- 1987: Jeux d'Artifices by Virginie Thévenet
- 1994: La Folie Douce by Frédéric Jardin
- 2009: La Traversée du Désir by Arielle Dombasle
- 2018: Alien Crystal Palace by Arielle Dombasle

=== Television appearances ===
- 2023: Drag Race France as Guest judge

== In popular culture ==
- Breaking Bad antagonist Lydia Rodarte-Quayle frequently wore black Louboutin stilettos. Camera angles often focused on the shoes and trademark soles, particularly during the episode "Buried".
- Lucifer protagonist Lucifer Morningstar often wore red-soled Louboutin shoes.
- Sex and the City protagonist Carrie Bradshaw wore many pairs of shoes designed by Louboutin.
- Jennifer Lopez's single "Louboutins" was inspired by the footwear, and the visual imagery associated with the song—such as the album art—features a woman wearing a pair of Louboutin heels with red bottoms.
- Rapper Cardi B, whose taste for Louboutin shoes is part of her image, alludes to the red-bottomed shoes in her song "Bodak Yellow".
- The corrupted brand name, "Labuten" appears in the chorus of the song "Экспонат" ("Exhibit") by the Russian ska band Leningrad. A counterfeit pair of shoes can be seen in the music video. After numerous mentions in the media, Louboutin representatives in Russia asked them to stop making inappropriate references to the brand.
- Blake Lively often wears Christian Louboutin shoes, highlighting her close relationship with the designer, who even named a shoe after her, the "Blake". She has been photographed wearing Louboutins at various red carpet events, premieres and fashion galas around the world.
- Iggy Azalea prominently references Christian Louboutin shoes in the opening line of her song "Work" ("Walk a mile in these Louboutins…"), highlighting their cultural significance and status as symbols of luxury and fashion.
- Taylor Swift wore custom designed Louboutin shoes during performances of her international The Eras Tour.

== General references ==
- Footwear News, 1 June 1992, p. S8; 9 December 2002, p. 50
- Harper's Bazaar, December 1999, p. 104; April 2001, p. 226
- Newsweek International, 24 February 2003, p. 48
- People, 10 February 2003, pp. 87–88
- Vogue, June 2004, p. 206
- Denardo, Maria (18 January 2012). "Christian Louboutin Hires Priya Mohindra". Daily Front Row. Archived from the original on 22 January 2012.
