= Heated (Big Sugar album) =

Studio album by Big Sugar
- Released: September 1, 1998
- Studio: Opium Den, Toronto; Phase One, Toronto
- Genre: Rock, blues rock
- Length: 56:01
- Label: A&M
- Producer: Gordie Johnson

Big Sugar chronology
Hemi-Vision (1996)	Heated (1998)	Chauffe à bloc (1999)

Heated
- U.S. album cover

Professional ratings
Review scores
Source	Rating
AllMusic	3/5 stars

Heated is the fourth album by Canadian rock band Big Sugar, released on the A&M Records label. It was released in the United States in 1999 on Capricorn Records with an alternate album cover. The US release also includes the hit track "Diggin' a Hole" from Hemi-Vision, which was not released in the US. The album was certified Platinum in Canada, selling over 100,000 copies.

The album features a cover of Bachman–Turner Overdrive's "Let it Ride".

== Track listing ==
Canadian release:

1. "Where I Stand" – 5:58
2. "Better Get Used to It" – 2:55
3. "The Scene" – 4:15
4. "Cop a Plea" – 4:55
5. "Girl Watcher" – 4:09
6. "Round & Round" – 4:43
7. "Kickin' Stones" – 5:14
8. "Hammer In My Hand" - 4:23
9. "100 Cigarettes" – 4:03
10. "Turn the Lights On" – 3:54
11. "Let It Ride" – 5:49
12. "Heart Refuse to Pound (For Alex)" – 5:27

US release:

1. "Where I Stand" – 5:58
2. "Better Get Used to It" – 2:55
3. "The Scene" – 4:15
4. "Girl Watcher" – 4:09
5. "Diggin' a Hole" – 4:39
6. "Cop a Plea" – 4:55
7. "Round & Round" – 4:43
8. "Kickin' Stones" – 5:14
9. "Let it Ride" – 5:49
10. "100 Cigarettes" – 4:03
11. "Turn the Lights On" – 3:54
12. "Heart Refuse to Pound (For Alex)" – 5:27
