= Big Sugar (album) =

Studio album by Big Sugar
- Released: January 1, 1992
- Recorded: 1991
- Genre: Blues rock
- Label: Hypnotic Records
- Producer: Tom Treumuth

Big Sugar chronology
Big Sugar (1992)	Five Hundred Pounds (1993)

Professional ratings
Review scores
Source	Rating
AllMusic	mixed
The Encyclopedia of Popular Music	3/5 stars

Big Sugar is the debut album by Canadian rock band Big Sugar, released 1992 on Hypnotic Records.

== Critical reception ==
AllMusic wrote that "Gordie Johnson himself pens the discs two highlights: both 'Groundhog Day' and 'Goodbye Train' feature funky, lurching rhythms and muscular guitar work that offer just the right blend of originality and familiarity."

== Track listing ==
1. "Sleep in Late" (Dave Wall, Andrew Whiteman)
2. "Come Back Baby" (B.B. Arnold)
3. "Motherless Children" (traditional)
4. "So Many Roads" (Marshall Paul)
5. "Bemsha Swing" (Denzil Best, Thelonious Monk)
6. "Stardust" (Hoagy Carmichael, Mitchell Parish)
7. "Groundhog Day" (Gordie Johnson)
8. "Just About Sunrise" (Johnson)
9. "Goodbye Train" (Johnson)
10. "Nowhere to Go" (Colin Linden)
11. "'Round Midnight" (Bernie Hanighen, Monk, Cootie Williams)
12. "Devil Got My Woman" (Skip James)

== Personnel ==
=== Big Sugar ===
- Gordie Johnson: Guitars, vocals
- Terry Wilkins: Bass, vocals
- Al Cross: Drums

=== Additional Personnel ===
- Patrick Ballentyne, Andrew Whiteman: Acoustic guitars, vocals
- Nick Gotham, Gene Hardy, Johnny Johnson: Saxophone
- Jim Bish: Flute
- Ken Whiteley: Mandolin
- Greg Beresford: Percussion
- Kate Fenner, David Wall: Additional vocals
  - Beresford, Fenner, Hardy, Wall and Whiteman all appear "Courtesy of the Bourbon Tabernacle Choir" (according to liner notes)
