= Chris Colepaugh =

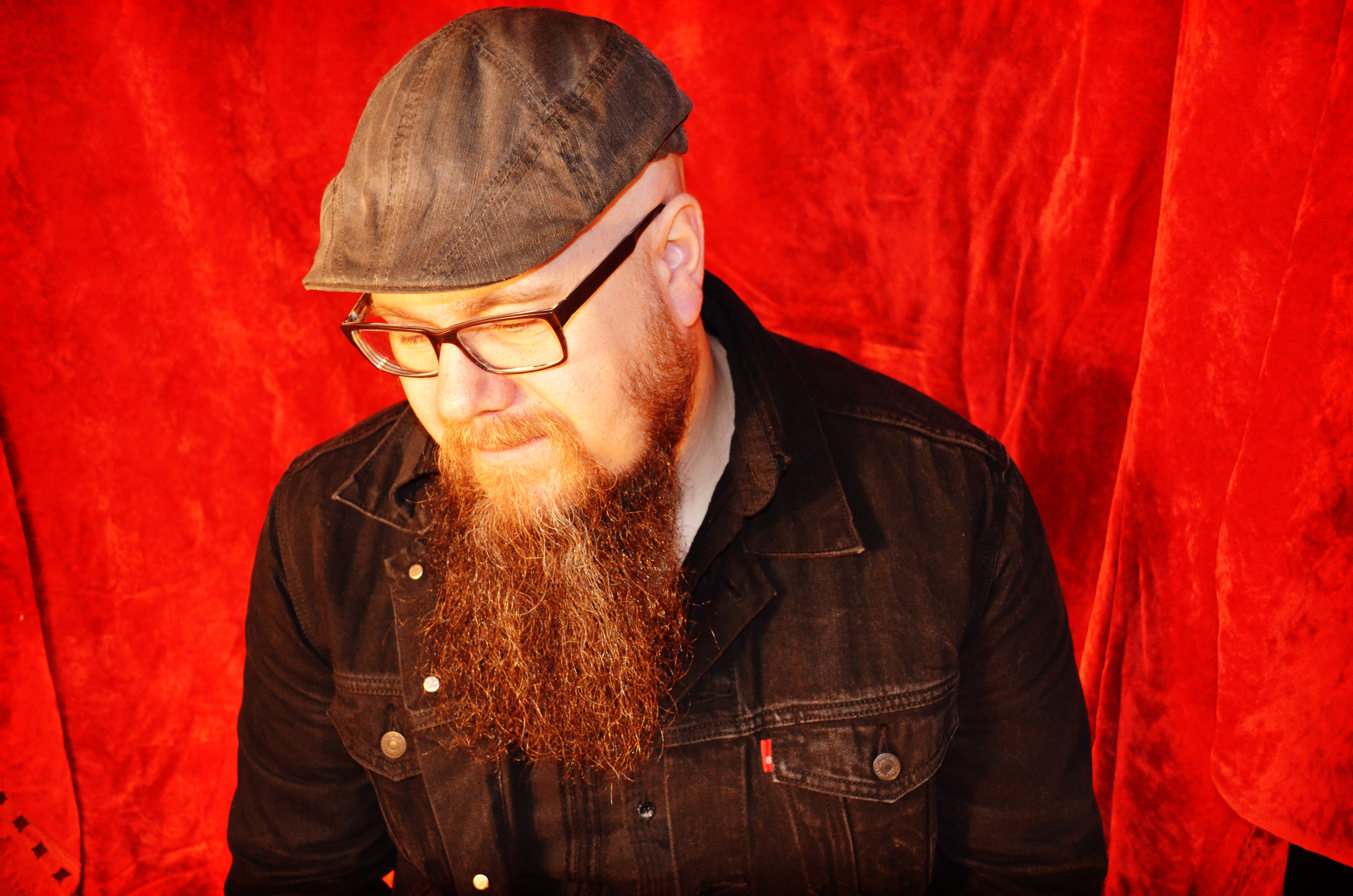
- Colepaugh in 2019

Background information
- Origin: Moncton, New Brunswick, Canada
- Genres: Rock
- Occupations: Musician, singer
- Instruments: Vocals, Guitar, Drums
- Years active: 1996–present
- Label: Heavy Gauge Records Ltd.
- Website: colepaugh.com

Chris Colepaugh is a blues-rock musician and front man of the band Chris Colepaugh and the Cosmic Crew. The band was founded in Moncton, New Brunswick, Canada, in 1996. A busy touring band, Chris Colepaugh and the Cosmic Crew won the East Coast Music Awards Entertainer of the Year Award in 2011. The band has opened in Canada and the United States for headliners such as Big Sugar, Gov't Mule, and the North Mississippi All-Stars.

== Career ==
=== The Cosmic Crew ===
Chris Colepaugh and the Cosmic Crew got together in 1996 with Chris Colepaugh on lead guitars and vocals, Lynn Daigle on bass, and Craig Watson on drums. Colepaugh, Daigle, and Watson recorded the group's first album, Galaxy in one day, and the band began playing regularly throughout Canada's Maritime Provinces.

The band's next album, Mazes and Mirrors, was recorded live in a recording studio in Halifax, and produced by Kevin MacMichael (Cutting Crew, Robert Plant). The band went through a couple of different drummers after this, but by the time they recorded their next album, 16 Second Solace, Watson had returned.

=== Solo work ===
Starting with 2001's Trip, Colepaugh began playing all the instruments himself on his albums, but still credited them to Chris Colepaugh and the Cosmic Crew. The Canadian music site Exclaim! compared the album favorably to the psychedelia-tinged folk-rock of San Francisco in the late '60s.

Colepaugh's career took an unexpected hiatus when he required emergency surgery on his gall bladder in 2004, and suffered through a long recovery process. He did not return to recording until 2006, with the album In Your Backyard. The next release was the live album Burning (2009), recorded with bandmates Daigle and drummer Danny Bourgeois.

Colepaugh's 2010 album, Missed a Page was widely acclaimed. Relix Magazine hailed it for its variety, and praised Colepaugh's skill on his double-necked Gibson, saying, "Guitar riffs don't get much thicker than this." Missed a Page won a prestigious East Coast Music Award in 2011 for best rock album, and Colepaugh also won the ECMA Entertainer of the Year award that same year.

Colepaugh has been in demand as a session musician, most notably playing pedal steel, electric and acoustic guitar with Canadian singer-songwriter/entertainer Roch Voisine, playing drums with Canadian rock artist Big Sugar, as well as appearing on albums by Dominique Dupuis, Jason Haywood, and others.

Colepaugh's album, RnR, was released in 2016. The album featured "an infusion of southern-inspired rock greased with some rhythm & blues, and packed with all the energy of a live album," according to The East, an online arts and culture magazine focused on the Maritime Provinces. A reviewer on the CBC said that on this album Colepaugh was "reminiscent of Jeff Healey". and was "really on the top of his game here."

Colepaugh's most recent releases are spread out over the year of 2019 with one song being released each month.

== Discography ==
=== Albums ===
- Galaxy (1996)
- Mazes and Mirrors (1997)
- 16 Second Solace (1999)
- Trip (2001)
- In Time (2003)
- Your Backyard (2006)
- Burning (live album) (2009)
- Missed a Page (2010)
- RnR (2016)

=== Singles ===
- "Hark! The Herald Angels Sing" (2017)
- "Angels We Have Heard On High" (2018)
- "Louder" (2019)
- "Mama's Eyes" (2019)
- "Sunday Night" (2019)
- "Walk On" (2019)
- "I Want to See the Bright Lights" (2019)
- "Only One Left" (2019)
- "Could Have Been" (2019)

== TV/film placement ==
- "Caught Up in You" - DeGrassi: The Next Generation (Season 8, Episode 8)

== Awards ==
- 2011: East Coast Music Award: Winner, Entertainer of the Year
- 2011: East Coast Music Award: Winner, Rock Album of the Year
- 2010: Music New Brunswick Award: Winner, Musician of the Year
- 2010: Music New Brunswick Award: Winner, Rock Album of the Year
