= Mystery on Fifth Avenue =

New York Times article

"Mystery on Fifth Avenue" is the title of a New York Times article written by Penelope Green in June 2008 about a mystery apartment on Fifth Avenue in New York City. The apartment, a 4,200-square-foot luxury co-op formerly inhabited by Marjorie Merriweather Post and E.F. Hutton, was purchased by Wall Street mogul Steven B. Klinsky and his wife Maureen Sherry for $8.5 million. They hired architectural designer Eric Clough and his firm 212box for the renovation, during which Clough embedded an extensive mystery in the apartment in the form of riddles, ciphers, puzzles, and hidden objects, for Klinsky’s and Sherry's four children. It was done without his clients' knowledge, and they did not discover the mystery until several months after moving in.

The apartment's hidden dimension began to reveal itself with the arrival of a letter stamped "Lost Post." It was addressed to the family, apparently written by a former occupant who had died decades earlier. It contained a poem full of riddles leading to puzzles covertly embedded throughout the apartment in the form of hidden keys, secret compartments, and glowing boxes. In total, eighteen clues were hidden, including a novel and a soundtrack with original music written by Canadian singers Kate Fenner and Chris Brown.

The clues embedded in the mystery apartment were a vast collaboration by many people at the firm, and outside artists enlisted by Clough. His first choice for the author of the narrative book that would accompany the mystery was Jonathan Safran Foer. Clough sent Foer a cube sculpture made of anodized aluminum, encased in an acrylic cube that opens into a puzzle stamped with his firm’s phone number and the word “Please.” Clough also reached out to sculptor Tom Otterness. but both declined due to being busy and unable to work on a project for free.

== Feature film rights ==
In 2008, The rights to the "Mystery on Fifth Avenue" article were purchased by J. J. Abrams.
