= Five Hundred Pounds =

Studio album by Big Sugar
- Released: October 27, 1993
- Recorded: 1993
- Genre: Blues rock
- Length: 47:32
- Labels: Hypnotic Records; Third Man Records (30th Anniversary vinyl)
- Producers: Gordie Johnson; Peter Prilesnik

Big Sugar chronology
Big Sugar (1991)	Five Hundred Pounds (1993)	Dear M.F. (1995)

500 Pounds
- U.S. album cover

Professional ratings
Review scores
Source	Rating
Allmusic	4/5 stars

Five Hundred Pounds is an album by Canadian rock band Big Sugar, released in 1993 on Hypnotic Records. In 1995, the album was released in the United States as 500 Pounds, with an alternate album cover and an alternate track listing.

== Commercial performance ==
Based on Big Sugar's burgeoning reputation as a live band, the album sold 10,000 copies solely by word of mouth before it garnered any significant radio airplay. The album was certified Gold in Canada in 1999.

== Influence ==
Jack White is a fan of Five Hundred Pounds, having bought the album at a Big Sugar concert in Detroit in 1993. He has stated that the album is "the best blues-based record to ever come out of Canada." White performed "Ride Like Hell" live during his concert in Toronto in 2022 and has continued to perform it live occasionally.

== Track listing ==
1. "Ride Like Hell" – 4:48
2. "Standing Around Crying" – 3:56
3. "I'm a Ram" – 3:31
4. "Sugar in My Coffee" – 5:12
5. "All Over Now" – 3:41
6. "AAA Aardvark Hotel" – 2:13
7. "How Many Times" – 4:05
8. "Deliver Me" – 4:16
9. "Still Waitin'" – 5:31
10. "Wild Ox Moan" – 5:41
11. "Ride On" – 6:49

== Personnel ==
=== Big Sugar ===
- Gordie Johnson: Guitars, vocals
- Al Cross: Drums

=== Additional Personnel ===
- Dave Wall: drums (Standing Around Crying)
- Kelly Hoppe: harmonica, saxophone
- Michael Johnson: trumpet
- Gene Hardy: saxophone
- James Monroe, Chris Brown: trombone
- Patrick Ballantyne: vocals, acoustic guitar
- A. Whitman: "for loan of Merc" (according to liner notes)
