= Bourbon Tabernacle Choir =

Canadian alternative rock band

- Origin: Toronto, Ontario, Canada
- Genres: Alternative rock
- Years active: 1985–1995
- Labels: Yonder Records
- Past members: Kate Fenner; Chris Brown; Andrew Whiteman; Chris Miller; Chris Plock; Jason Mercer; Gregor Beresford; Dave Wall; Gene Hardy; Tom Bona; Derek Sinclair; Peter Mercier
- Website: bourbontabernaclechoir.com

The Bourbon Tabernacle Choir were a Canadian alternative rock band that formed in 1985 in Toronto.

== History ==
The band consisted of vocalist Kate Fenner, vocalist and organist Chris Brown, vocalist and guitarist Andrew Whiteman, guitarist Chris Miller, saxophone and vocalist Chris Plock, bassist Jason Mercer, drummer Gregor Beresford, and guitarist and vocalist Peter Mercier when all of the founding members were high school classmates. Vocalist Dave Wall joined the band in 1988, and vocalist and saxophonist Gene Hardy joined in 1989.

They released three independent cassettes: First Taste of Bourbon in 1987, If Hell Had a Houseband in 1989 and Sister Anthony in 1990. The single "Put Your Head On" b/w "As Right as They Want to Be" (1990), produced by Bob Wiseman and recorded at Metalworks Studios in Mississauga, attracted the attention of film director Bruce McDonald, who included it on the soundtrack to his 1991 film Highway 61. Both songs were later available on the CD reissue of Sister Anthony in 1995, although the original version of "As Right as They Want to Be" was replaced with a live version.

With the exposure they gained from "Put Your Head On", the band signed to the independent label Yonder Records, and released Superior Cackling Hen in 1992. The singles "Make Amends", "Afterglow" and "Original Grin" were all hits on campus and modern rock radio stations in the next year.

Following the release of Superior Cackling Hen, Whiteman left the band in 1993. After leaving the Bourbons, Whiteman recorded as a solo artist, and subsequently became a member of the bands Que Vida, Broken Social Scene and Apostle of Hustle. Beresford left the band in 1994, and performed drum tracks on Tom Cochrane's 1995 album, Ragged Ass Road; Tom Bona replaced him in 1995.

Howie Beck and Daniel Barnes played with the band during this era.

In 1995, the band released Shy Folk, which featured contributions from Ani DiFranco and was produced by Michael Phillip Wojewoda, and which featured the singles "All Peace" and "Be My Witness". Despite strong critical reviews, however, an expected mainstream breakthrough did not materialize, as the band's manager pursued a strategy of keeping them off the road at first, in the hope of allowing market demand for their live show to build up so that he could book the band into larger venues than they had previously played. Instead of having the intended effect, the strategy merely reduced the album's sales to barely half those of Superior Cackling Hen, and effectively derailed the band's commercial momentum. In addition, when the band did finally tour they maintained a policy of refusing to play venues or music festivals, including Canadian Music Week, which involved sponsorship by tobacco companies, which further limited the number of venues available for them to play.

A CD reissue of Sister Anthony was also released in 1995.

Following Shy Folk, the band relocated to New York City to make its final bid for commercial success in the larger American market, but instead the band soon broke up.

== Post-breakup ==
After the breakup, Brown and Fenner continued to record and perform as a duo. Jason Mercer played with DiFranco's band and continues to tour with Ron Sexsmith as his bass player. He lives in Brooklyn, New York, and works as a producer. Dave Wall recorded two albums (Lozenge and The Spell I Was Under) as a solo artist, performed in a duo with Marilyn Lerner and performed as a member of the Flying Bulgar Klezmer Band and Both Ends of the Earth. Chris Miller worked in film post-production. Hardy, Bona and Plock became session musicians who have played on albums by a wide variety of Canadian rock, pop, jazz and blues musicians, and Beresford joined David Wilcox's band.

A retrospective album, Simply the Best 1985–1995, was released in 2000.

In 2008, the band played a reunion show at the Hillside Festival in Guelph on July 26, 2008 at the insistence of the festival's director Sam Baijal. He felt it was important that they headline the festival's 25th anniversary. The reunion lineup consisted of Brown, Fenner, Miller, Mercer, Wall, Hardy, Whiteman and Bona.

== Discography ==
- A First Taste of Bourbon (1985)
- If Hell Had a Houseband (1987)
- Sister Anthony (1990)
- Superior Cackling Hen (1992)
- Shy Folk (1995)
- Simply the Best 1985–1995 (2000)
