= Brothers and Sisters, Are You Ready? =

2001 album by Big Sugar

Studio album by Big Sugar
- Released: July 3, 2001
- Genres: Blues rock, reggae fusion, alternative rock
- Label: Universal
- Producer: Gordie Johnson

Big Sugar chronology
Extra Long Life (2000)	Brothers and Sisters, Are You Ready? (2001)	Hit & Run (2003)

Professional ratings
Review scores
Source	Rating
Allmusic	2.5/5 stars

Brothers and Sisters, Are You Ready? is the fifth album by Big Sugar, It was released concurrently with a separate album containing French versions of the same songs, Brothers and Sisters, Êtes Vous Ready?. The album was nominated for Best Rock Album at the 2002 Juno Awards. Brothers and Sisters, Are You Ready? was certified Gold (50,000 units) by the CRIA in August 2003.

== Track listing ==
1. "Red Rover" – 4:57
2. "Nashville Grass" – 3:49
3. "She Left Ashes" – 4:04
4. "Nicotina (She's All That)" – 4:02
5. "So Not Over" – 3:33
6. "Butterball" – 4:06
7. "Bump on the Head" – 4:12
8. "Lost and Found" – 3:55
9. "Bad Old Days" – 3:36
10. "We Could Live" – 4:10
11. "Pretty Bird" – 3:12
12. "All Hell for a Basement" – 4:00
13. "O Canada" – 2:17

== Year-end charts ==
Chart (2002)	Position
Canadian Alternative Albums (Nielsen SoundScan)	162

== Brothers and Sisters, Êtes Vous Ready? ==
Brothers and Sisters, Êtes Vous Ready?

Studio album by Big Sugar
- Released: 2001
- Genres: Blues rock, reggae fusion, alternative rock
- Label: Universal
- Producer: Gordie Johnson

Brothers and Sisters, Êtes Vous Ready?, released in 2001, contains French versions of songs from Brothers and Sisters, Are You Ready?, along with four songs found only on the French release: "La Bombe", "Busté", "Harmonie" and "À nu (Pom Pom)".

Track listing

1. "Le Vainqueur"
2. "Nashville Grass (For Woody)"
3. "Elle est passée"
4. "Tina Gasolina (Elle est tout çà)"
5. "(Loin d'être) Over"
6. "La Bombe"
7. "Bump on the Head"
8. "Lost and Found"
9. "Busté"
10. "Harmonie"
11. "L'Oiseau reggae"
12. "À nu (Pom Pom)"
13. "O Canada"

The album was also released in an international version which did not include the band's rendition of "O Canada".
