= Dear Mr. Fantasy =

1967 song by Traffic

Song by Traffic

from the album Mr. Fantasy
- Released: 8 December 1967
- Recorded: November 1967
- Studio: Olympic, London
- Genre: Folk rock; blues rock; psychedelic rock
- Length: 5:44
- Label: Island (UK); United Artists (US)
- Composers: Steve Winwood; Chris Wood
- Lyricist: Jim Capaldi
- Producer: Jimmy Miller

Audio
- "Dear Mr. Fantasy" on YouTube

"Dear Mr. Fantasy" is a song by English rock band Traffic and the title track of their 1967 debut album, Mr. Fantasy. Jim Capaldi contributed the lyrics, while Steve Winwood and Chris Wood composed the music.

In a song review for AllMusic, Lindsay Planer writes:

A slightly trippy dark and foreboding tone permeates both the lyrics and arrangement contrasting the rock-solid pop delivery. Tying it all together are Winwood’s emotive and residually mournful lyrics. With a distinct blue-eyed soul intonation – perfected during a seminal stint in the Spencer Davis Group – he effortlessly increases the drama with a combination of slightly behind the beat timing and empathic vocals.

Dave Matthews mentioned this song specifically as part of his speech inducting Traffic into the Rock and Roll Hall of Fame, and this is the song they played as part of that same induction.

== Renditions ==
Traffic recorded an extended version (10:57) for their live album Welcome to the Canteen (1971). Winwood played the song at Eric Clapton's 2007 Crossroads Guitar Festival and the song appears on the festival DVD. Winwood and Clapton played the song on their joint tour; a live recording appears on the album Live from Madison Square Garden (2009). Planer also notes performances by Mike Bloomfield and Al Kooper (1969, The Live Adventures of Mike Bloomfield and Al Kooper); the Grateful Dead (1980s–1990s), and Crosby, Stills, & Nash (1991, CSN box set). Canadian rock band Big Sugar recorded a version of the song which was first released as the title track of their 1995 EP, Dear M.F., and which was later included on their greatest hits compilation, Hit & Run in 2003.

== In popular culture ==
The song was used near the beginning of Avengers: Endgame when Tony Stark and Nebula are floating through space after the events of Avengers: Infinity War.
