= Big Sugar (band) =

Canadian band

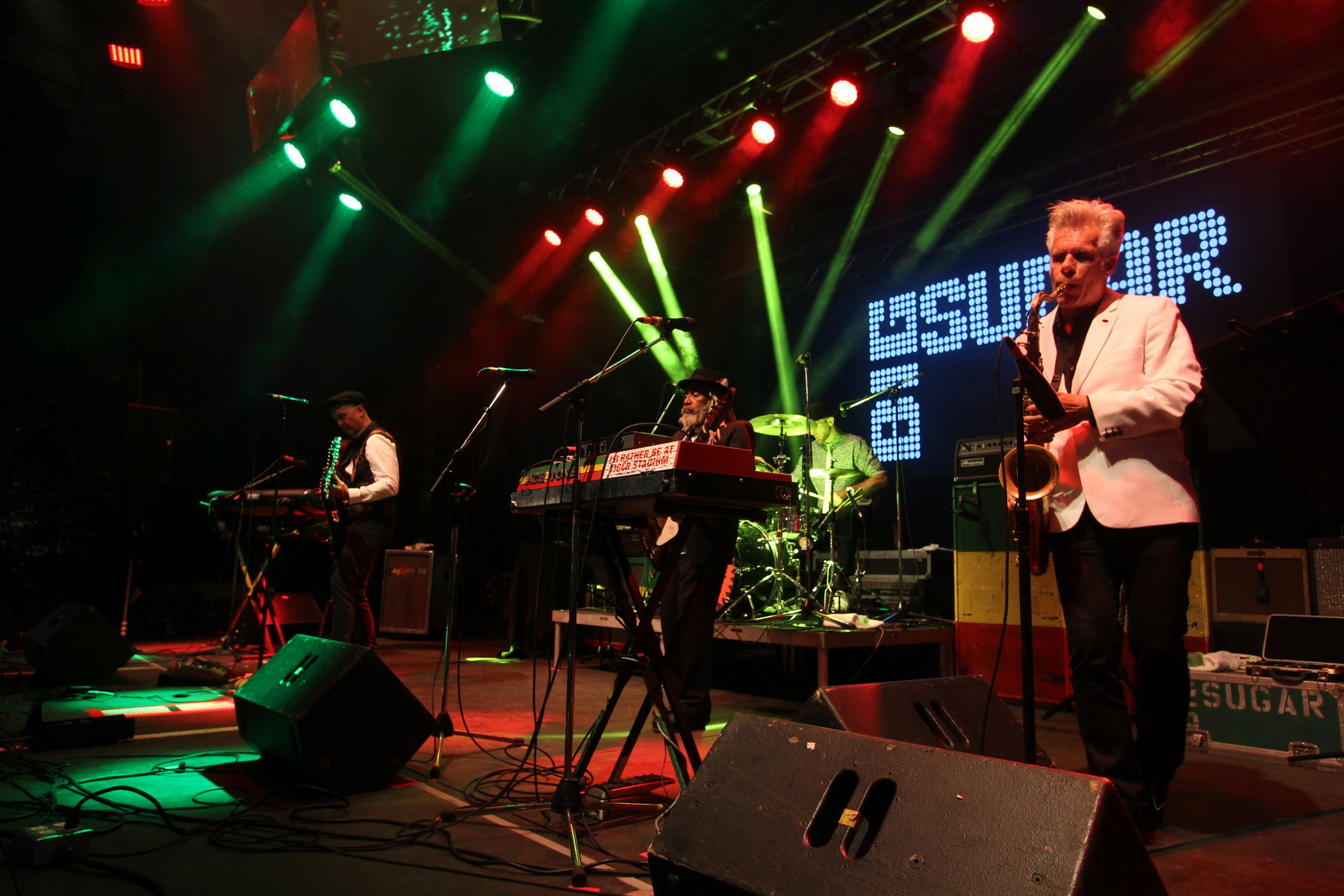
- Big Sugar at Kitchener Blues Festival 2016

Background information
- Origin: Toronto, Ontario, Canada
- Genres: Rock, reggae, alternative rock, acoustic rock, progressive rock, reggae rock, blues rock, stoner rock
- Years active: 1988–present
- Labels: Bread & Butter Productions, eOne Entertainment, Universal, A&M, Hypnotic, Silvertone, Capricorn
- Members: Gordie Johnson; Anders Drerup; Root Valach
- Past members: Terry Wilkins; Al Cross; Walter 'Crash' Morgan†; Paul Brennan; Lloyd 'Mojah' Benn; Kelly Hoppe; Garry Lowe†; Tony 'Raffa' White†; Stich Wynston; Stephane Beaudin; Christopher Friendlyness Hatton; Chris Gormley; Chris Colepaugh; Rey Arteaga; Big Ben Richardson; Ben Lowe; Joe Magistro
- Website: bigsugar.com

Big Sugar is a band formed in Toronto in 1988 by Gordie Johnson, the band's lead singer, lead guitarist and main songwriter. Between 1996 and 2016, Big Sugar was among the top 25 best-selling Canadian bands in Canada. They are still active today, releasing new music, vinyl re-releases and touring.

== History ==
Big Sugar originally consisted of Johnson, bassist Terry Wilkins, and drummer Al Cross. The three musicians had already played together for several years as a supporting band for Molly Johnson's jazz performances, and as an informal jam band with members of the Bourbon Tabernacle Choir. When Molly Johnson returned to rock music with Infidels, she helped her former bandmates secure a record deal, leading to the eponymous debut album released in 1991 on Hypnotic Records.

== Success ==
Wilkins left the band in 1993. Big Sugar recorded the album Five Hundred Pounds with the help of guest musicians, including harmonica and tenor saxophonist Kelly Hoppe, a.k.a. Mr. Chill. Hoppe and Johnson were longtime friends from the same home town; Hoppe had given Johnson his first gig as a guitarist. He brought a blues and old-school R'n'B influence into the band's sound and later added keyboards and melodica. He became a regular member of the band in September 1994, while bassist Garry Lowe had joined the band that July.

Lowe moved to Toronto in the mid-1970s from Kingston, Jamaica, became a bass player for touring reggae recording artists, and was a founding member of Culture Shock, a popular Toronto reggae band. Johnson had long admired Lowe; his was the bass sound that Johnson had been looking for. Johnson told The Globe & Mail, "His bass sound became how I envisioned Big Sugar's sound—a blend of blues and rock anchored by his reggae groove." Johnson told Artsfile Ottawa of their unique musical language, "...so much of our connection was unspoken. We didn't work things through musically. If I played a little something, he would play a little something back. It was a very symbiotic relationship."

In 1993, Big Sugar released the album Five Hundred Pounds, which had little publicity or radio airplay but sold 10,000 copies in Canada on the strength of their live shows. In 1995, Johnson also recorded an album under the name Don't Talk Dance, with Tyler Stewart of Barenaked Ladies and Chris Brown of the Bourbon Tabernacle Choir.

In 1994 they appeared in the drama film The Circle Game, portraying the blues band of which the film's lead character was a member, and performing several numbers in that context.

In 1995, Big Sugar released two EPs, Dear M.F. (which featured a cover version of Traffic's "Dear Mr. Fantasy") and Ride Like Hell. Drummer Stich Wynston, who had taken over from Al Cross, was replaced by Walter "Crash" Morgan. During a show in Iowa, Morgan suffered a heart attack and died on stage. Tyler Stewart flew in to help finish the tour, followed by Tony Rabalao. Lowe's musical partner Tony 'Raffa' White was enlisted for recording and other live performances, becoming Johnson's favorite studio drummer and appearing on many Big Sugar albums. Former Odds member Paul Brennan subsequently joined as the band's new drummer, playing on one of their most commercially successful albums, 1996's Hemi-Vision. Brennan left the band in May 1997 leading to Al Cross' return.

A French version of Hemi-Vision's single "Opem Up Baby" was recorded, titled "Ouvres-Toi Bébé", for radio stations in Quebec. The song gained widespread airplay in the province, and for their next album, 1998's platinum-selling Heated, the band recorded a French version of each single they released; the French songs were collected on the 1999 EP Chauffe à bloc. Also that year, Johnson and Hoppe began to perform acoustic shows as a duo, billed as "Big Sugar Acoustic—Two Fools on Stools".

In 1999, Big Sugar added a new rhythm guitarist, Lloyd 'Mojah' Benn. In February that year they opened for The Rolling Stones at the Air Canada Centre, and in July, performed at Woodstock 1999.

In 2000, the band released a dub album, Extra Long Life, under the stage name AlKaline, which toured as an eight-piece band, complete with horn section. In 2001, Big Sugar released Brothers and Sisters, Are You Ready?; a complete track-for-track French version, Brothers and Sisters, Êtes Vous Ready?, was released the same year. The English album concluded with a blistering rendition of "O Canada" that became their signature version and was included on the 2017 Universal Music box set Canada 150: A Celebration of Music, released as part of the 150th anniversary of Canada.

== Hit And Run: The Best Of Big Sugar ==
The two-CD compilation Hit & Run, that included a special edition, limited-run live concert performance disc, was released in 2003. The live performance disc, Run, sold out on release day, with the two-disc set becoming a collector's item.

== Hiatus ==
After a farewell national tour for Big Sugar, Johnson moved to Austin, Texas, where, in 2003, he had co-founded the band Grady with "Whipper" Chris Layton (Double Trouble) on drums and Big Ben Richardson on bass. Described as 'cowboy metal', Grady recordings included some alternate versions of Big Sugar songs and was signed to the Jello Biafra label Alternative Tentacles as well as the Norwegian metal label Voices of Wonder. After 3 Grady albums and many tours, Johnson was stricken with carpal tunnel syndrome and had surgery, being warned by doctors he might not be able to play guitar again. While recovering he taught himself to play triple neck steel guitar. Pairing that with Moog bass pedals, Johnson formed the duo Sit Down, Servant!!, first with drummer Stephane Beaudin, who was replaced by Brannen Temple. Sit Down, Servant!! toured the world, opening for Joe Satriani and George Thorogood. Kelly Hoppe formed Mr. Chill and The Witnesses, a roots music group. Mojah and Garry Lowe formed the reggae band Truth and Rights Revue, releasing one album. In recent years Johnson has also formed the group Snakes of Central Texas with bassist Bobby "Rock" Landgraf (Corrosion of Conformity) (Down (band)), which is still active when Johnson is not on tour.

== Reunion ==
Big Sugar reunited at the Telus World Ski & Snowboard Festival in Whistler, B.C. on April 23, 2010, with tour dates through that summer. In June 2011, they released the album Revolution Per Minute, which included keyboard player and rapper DJ Friendlyness. Revolution Per Minute was released on CD and vinyl, with the vinyl album containing Alkaline dub remixes and bonus songs. This album contained the number one radio hit "Roads Ahead". In 2012, Big Sugar released Eliminate Ya! Live!, a double CD/DVD set that included a new single covering Al Tuck's "Eliminate Ya!", recorded at the Burton Cummings Theatre in Winnipeg, Canada.>

In 2012, the band welcomed special guest reggae legend Willi Williams on their national tour.

In 2014, Big Sugar released the album Yard Style, which contains unplugged versions of nine of their original songs, plus four previously unreleased songs. The album was recorded live off the floor with the large group of musicians, most on hand drums, sitting in a circle 'yard style'. This release was followed by a three-month national theatre tour with the ensemble of musicians from the studio recording, resulting in 10–12 musicians on stage nightly. In June 2014, Raffa died of cancer.

Their next studio album, Calling All The Youth, was released in 2015 and distributed by eOne Records. The next two years were spent touring, including Big Sugar European tours, the North American acoustic tour, and summer festival dates. In 2015, Johnson's wife, Alex Johnson, Big Sugar's manager since the '90s, joined the band on percussion, keyboards and backing vocals.

In May 2017, Hoppe retired from touring and the band. DJ Friendlyness left to focus on his band, The Human Rights. This created the opportunity for Austin-based Rey Arteaga, master of Afro-Cuban Congas, to join Big Sugar, which had become a percussion-heavy, guitar-based band as it no longer had keyboards, harmonica or horns. On July 7, 2018, Garry Lowe died of cancer. Big Ben Richardson, Johnson's partner in Grady who played bass in Big Sugar briefly before Lowe joined the band, returned to the stage and Chris Colepaugh joined on drums.

On December 28, 2018, the date of Garry Lowe's birthday, Big Sugar played a tribute concert for him in Toronto of the Big Sugar song catalogue. Joining them were members of Barenaked Ladies, Bedouin Soundclash, Broken Social Scene, Sloan, Danko Jones, Dream Warriors, The Road Hammers, The Human Rights, I Mother Earth, The New Deal, Culture Shock, and Wide Mouth Mason, plus Tom Wilson, Isax Injah, Maestro Fresh Wes, Julian Taylor, Willi Williams, Errol Blackwood, Mojah Benn, Adrian Sheriff Miller, and Leroy Sibbles.

In 2018, Universal Music's ICON album series released a Big Sugar ICON album. In 2020, Universal released the first album of new music in 5 years, the Big Sugar album Eternity Now. Recorded and mixed at the Johnsons' studio, The Sound Shack, it features Alex Lifeson of Rush playing guitar on the title track. With the world going into lockdown due to the COVID-19 pandemic, the release show and tour was cancelled and Johnson performed a record release show online, singing and playing live, accompanied by the recorded bedtracks. Later that year, still in lockdown he performed an online record release show for the Deluxe Anniversary Hemi-Vision 25th Anniversary album, this time re-recording all parts himself and performing guitar and vocals live along with Warren Haynes, Chris Robinson, Rich Robinson, Colin James and Jason McCoy. A rendition of "If I Had My Way" saw hundreds of fans videos edited into the performance. It was such a feat that the record release show had to be delayed a day as it crashed the site upon going live. During the lockdown, Johnson also produced a one-season popular weekly series on YouTube called "GJ in the SoundShack", in which he talked about songwriting, recording and the equipment he uses.

In 2021, Johnson launched the tour "One Man Big Sugar Show—The Acoustical Sounds of Gordie Johnson", which is an acoustic performance of his songbook along with a showcase of his surprising comedic skills.

In the years of pandemic shutdown, Gordie Johnson reimagined the band as a power trio. Resuming touring in 2022 he welcomed Garry Lowe's son, bassist Ben Lowe, to the band and 22-year-old phenom drummer Root Valach. Universal Music Group released a deluxe 25th anniversary edition of the Big Sugar platinum album Heated, which featured "An Evening With" concert format of two sets, with the first being the album played live in its entirety for the first time, followed by hit songs and rarities after an intermission. Big Sugar's much-anticipated “Heated 25th Anniversary Tour” continued through 2023 as Gordie Johnson returned to the stage with new bassist and fellow Austinite Anders Drerup and drummer Valach. “Our music has always been about roots and culture and this is a perfect piece of that evolution."

2024 started with a Third Man Records vinyl deluxe release of Five Hundred Pounds, which sold out when announced, before the official release day. Multiple pressings of the album were necessary, in part due to the support of label owner Jack White who is a longtime fan of the band since seeing them in Detroit while in high school. He recorded a video for the release stating Five Hundred Pounds is "the best blues-based record to ever come out of Canada." White performs "Ride Like Hell" live during his during concerts culminating in its inclusion on his 2025 live album Break It All Down.

2024-25 saw Big Sugar support their success with the "500 Pounds Theatre Tour", which again featured "An Evening With" concert format of two sets, treating fans to the entire album played live in the first set followed by hits and favorites in the second set. This tour included a concert with Jack White in Vancouver at the Commodore Ballroom May, 2025. Gordie Johnson declared "I can think of no better way to spend my birthday!".

While Big Sugar has recorded a new album, 2026 will first begin with a "Hemi-Vision Live" tour. Given the vinyl release came out during lockdown, the well honed power trio of Johnson, Drerup and Valach decided to give fans a live concert after having a blast on stage at their Buffalo, NY show. They were playing on the bill with Govt Mule and during soundcheck Warren Haynes asked them to play "Hemi-Vision". It was such a success a tour was booked. A new album release is planned for late 2026.

== Awards and recognition ==
Gordie Johnson has earned numerous gold and platinum records with his band Big Sugar and as producer or musician with Govt Mule, Joel Plaskett, The Trews and Default, earning Grammy Awards as a producer for Taj Mahal and Warren Haynes.

Big Sugar received five Juno Award nominations: as Best New Group in 1995, Rock Album of the Year (Hemi-Vision) in 1997, Group of the Year in 1998, Best Video ("The Scene") in 2000 and, in 2002, Best Rock Album (Brothers and Sisters, Are You Ready?).

In 1995, Big Sugar won the European Edison Award, one of the oldest music awards in the world.

In 1998, the SOCAN awarded Big Sugar the songwriting award for "The Scene".

In 2003, Gibson guitar released a special edition limited-run Gordie Johnson Signature Series SGJ guitar with a hardshell case and Hugo Boss neckstrap. In 2013, the Hard Rock Café Hotel & Casino in Vancouver created a Gordie Johnson display that featured the SGJ.

In 2007, the Canadian Organization of Campus Activities (COCA) inducted Big Sugar into its Hall of Fame.

In 2010, Gordie Johnson was inducted into the Canada South Blues Society Hall of Fame.

Johnson received nominations by the WCMA as Producer of the Year in 2012, and Engineer of the Year in 2013.

In 2017, the Canadian Independent Music Association awarded Big Sugar its Road Gold Award.

== Discography ==
=== Albums ===
Year	Title	Chart positions	Certifications
Year	Title	CAN	CAN
1991	Big Sugar	-	-
1993	Five Hundred Pounds	-	Gold
1996	Hemi-Vision	5	Platinum
1998	Heated	3	Platinum
2000	Extra Long Life (as Alkaline)	20	-
2001	Brothers and Sisters, Are You Ready?	12	Gold
2001	Brothers and Sisters, Êtes Vous Ready?		
2011	Revolution per Minute	34	-
2013	Eliminate Ya! Live!	-	-
2014	Yard Style	-	-
2015	Calling All The Youth	-	-
2020	Eternity Now	-	-

=== Live albums ===
- Eliminate Ya! Live! – 2012
- El Seven Nite Club Featuring Big Sugar - 1993

=== DVDs ===
- Eliminate Ya! Live! – 2012

=== EPs ===
- Dear M.F. – 1995
- Ride Like Hell – 1995
- Chauffe à bloc – 1999

== Compilations ==
- Hit & Run - 2003

== As AlKaline ==
- Extra Long Life – 2000

== Singles ==
Year	Title	Peak Chart Position				Album
Year	Title	CAN	CAN Alt.	CAN Rock.	US Heritage Rock	Album
1991	"Sleep in Late"	—	×		—	Big Sugar
1992	"Goodbye Train"	—	×			Big Sugar
1992	"Come Back Baby"	—	×			Big Sugar
1992	"So Many Roads"	—	×			Big Sugar
1992	"Groundhog Day"	—	×			Big Sugar
1993	"Ride Like Hell"	—	×		—	Five Hundred Pounds
1994						Five Hundred Pounds
1994	"I'm a Ram"	—	×		—	Five Hundred Pounds
1994	"All Over Now"	—	×		—	Five Hundred Pounds
1994	"Wild Ox Moan"	—	×		—	Five Hundred Pounds
1995	"Dear Mr. Fantasy"	59	—		—	Dear M.F.
1996	"Diggin' a Hole"	9	—		—	Hemi-Vision
1996	"If I Had My Way"	13	11		—	Hemi-Vision
1997	"Gone For Good"	90	—		—	Hemi-Vision
1997	"Open Up Baby"	52	16		—	Hemi-Vision
1998	"The Scene"	36	1		—	Heated
1998	"Better Get Used to It"	17	18		26	Heated
1999	"Turn the Lights On"	—	8		—	Heated
1999	"Girl Watcher"	—	7		—	Heated
2001	"Red Rover"	—	×	×	—	Brothers and Sisters, Are You Ready?
2001	"Nicotina (She's All That)"	28	×	5	—	Brothers and Sisters, Are You Ready?
2001	"All Hell For A Basement"	—	×	×	—	Brothers and Sisters, Are You Ready?
2003	"I Want You Now"	—	×	×	—	Hit & Run
2011	"Roads Ahead"	—	45	8	—	Revolution Per Minute
2011	"Little Bit a All Right"	—	—	23	—	Revolution Per Minute
2011	"If Santa Don't Bring You No Funk"	—	—	—	—	non-album- Christmas single
2012	"Eliminate Ya!"	—	—	—	—	Eliminate Ya! Live!
2015	"Just Can't Leave You Alone"	—	—	50	—	Calling All The Youth
2020	"The Better It Gets"	—	—	16	—	Eternity Now
2020	"Wonder Woman"	—	—	43	—	Eternity Now
"—" denotes releases that did not chart. "×" denotes periods where charts did not exist or were not archived.

== See also ==
- Canadian rock
- Music of Canada
