= Gordie Johnson =

Canadian musician and producer

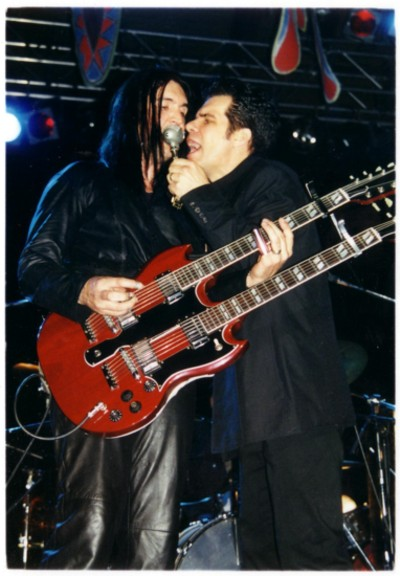
- Johnson (left) with Kelly Hoppe

Background information
- Born: Gordie Johnson; 22 May 1964 (age 62); Winnipeg, Manitoba, Canada
- Origin: Windsor, Ontario, Canada Medicine Hat, Alberta, Canada
- Genres: Reggae, rock
- Occupations: Guitarist, singer
- Instruments: Guitar, vocals, bass
- Years active: 1988–present
- Website: bigsugar.com

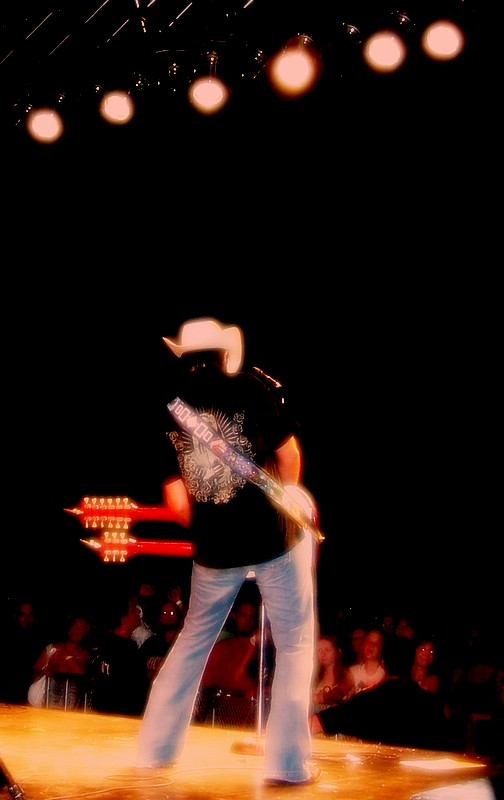
Johnson performing with Grady at the London Balloon Festival, 2006

Gordie Johnson is a Canadian musician, best known as the front man for the blues/reggae rock band Big Sugar, Austin-based blues/gospel band Sit Down Servant, southern rock band Grady and blues band Snakes of Central Texas.

Johnson is a Grammy nominated producer, mixer and session musician. He has produced, or mixed, albums and tracks for artists such as Gov't Mule, Warren Haynes, The Glorious Sons, Taj Mahal, Bushwick Bill, Toots Hibbert, Sarah Slean, The Trews, Joel Plaskett Emergency, The Respectables, Tim Chaisson, Len, Reel Big Fish, Chris Duarte, Caroline Neron, Meredith Shaw, as well as playing and/or recording with Chris Robinson, Rich Robinson, Colin James, Default, Honky, Len, Molly Johnson, Jonny Lang and Double Trouble, Ashley MacIsaac, the Bourbon Tabernacle Choir, and Big Rude Jake, Wide Mouth Mason.

== Biography ==
Johnson was born in Winnipeg, Manitoba, of Ukrainian descent, and grew up in Windsor, Ontario, starting his professional music career while still in high school as he frequently crossed the river to play in Detroit, Michigan. He played all genres of music in both Detroit and Windsor. Johnson's family moved to Medicine Hat, Alberta as he was about to go into his last year of high school. He completed school and then immediately returned to the Windsor/Detroit area to become a full-time musician. He is a vocalist and guitarist for the reggae rock band Big Sugar, the latin jazz band Sit Down Servant in which he plays a triple-neck steel guitar along with Moog bass pedals, the cowboy metal band Grady and heavy blues trio Snakes of Central Texas. Alex Johnson, his wife, is also his long-time manager and has performed and cowritten in Big Sugar.

Johnson is a bandleader, solo artist and also periodically plays in other bands. In 1999, Johnson performed solo as part of The White Ribbon Concert at the Phoenix Concert Theatre in Toronto. He has toured in the past as a bass player with Rich Robinson and Wide Mouth Mason and currently plays bass and tres guitar with Rey Arteaga's Latin music group based in Austin, Texas as well as his own group Snakes of Central Texas when not on tour with Big Sugar.

In 2020, with the world going into lockdown, the record release show and tour for Big Sugar's new album Eternity Now was cancelled and Gordie Johnson performed the release show "live" online that saw him playing and singing live, accompanied by the recorded bedtracks. During the pandemic, the Johnsons added a full video studio to their music studio allowing Gordie to hone his video production skills along with his record producing. Over the next two years, Johnson would go on to perform a record release show for the Deluxe Anniversary Hemi-Vision 25th Anniversary album, this time re-recording all parts himself and again performing guitar and vocals live along with friends Warren Haynes, Chris Robinson, Rich Robinson, Colin James, Jason McCoy and a rousing edition of "If I Had My Way" closing out the show that saw hundreds of fans videos edited into the performance. It was such a feat that the record release show had to be delayed a day as it crashed the site upon going live.

Critical acclaim accompanied the release of a one season "GJ in the SoundShack" series on YouTube that saw Gordie Johnson in a weekly episode talking (and occasionally performing) about a myriad of topics from songwriting to recording to a detailed look at equipment he uses.

As the world opened up again, "One Man Big Sugar Show- The Acoustical Sounds of Gordie Johnson" started touring and brought his songbook to life with an acoustic performance steeped in blues and folk music that inspired Johnson's Big Sugar catalogue. It consists of tales of triumph and disaster, spoken by Johnson.

Post pandemic Big Sugar returned to the stage with a new show and lineup. After the tragic death of Garry Lowe followed by the long shutdown, Gordie Johnson reimagined Big Sugar as a power trio now playing with bassist and fellow Austinite Anders Drerup and 23-year-old phenom drummer Root Valach. “Our music has always been about roots and culture and this is a perfect piece of that evolution."

== Awards and recognition ==
Gordie Johnson has earned numerous gold and platinum records with his band Big Sugar and as producer or musician with Govt Mule, Joel Plaskett, The Trews and Default, earning Grammy Awards as a producer for Taj Mahal and Warren Haynes.

Johnsons' Big Sugar received five Juno Award nominations: as Best New Group in 1995, Rock Album of the Year (Hemi-Vision) in 1997, Group of the Year in 1998, Best Video ("The Scene") in 2000 and, in 2002, Best Rock Album (Brothers and Sisters, Are You Ready?).

In 1995, Big Sugar won the European Edison Award one of the oldest music awards in the world.

In 2000, Johnson was named to the 'Toronto Star Best Dressed' list, a culmination of his decades-long Hugo Boss endorsement.

SOCAN #1 Song Awards as songwriter for Big Sugar "The Scene" in 1998 and The Trews "Not Ready To Go" in 2002 and "Highway of Heroes" in 2010.

In 2003, Gibson guitar released a special edition limited run "Gordie Johnson signature series SGJ" guitar that incorporated fashion house Hugo Boss with a HUGO neckstrap and hardshell case (as the longtime clothing endorser of Gordie Johnson and Big Sugar). Hard Rock Café Hotel & Casino created a Gordie Johnson display in the Vancouver, Canada location for its opening in 2013 that featured the "SGJ".

In 2005, Johnson and his Grady bandmates won Best New Band at the Austin Music Awards.

In 2007, COCA (Canadian Organization of Campus Activities) inducted Johnsons' Big Sugar into the Hall of Fame.

In 2010, Gordie Johnson was inducted into the Canada South Blues Society Hall of Fame.

In 2011, Gordie Johnson was nominated for a Grammy for his producer role on the Warren Haynes album "Man in Motion". This followed the Grammy-nominated Taj Mahal album that he co-produced/engineered in 2008.

Johnson received nominations by the WCMA as Producer of the Year in 2012, and Engineer of the Year in 2013.

In 2017, the Canadian Independent Music Association awarded Big Sugar its Road Gold Award.

== Discography ==
=== Big Sugar ===
- 1991 – Big Sugar
- 1993 – Five Hundred Pounds
- 1995 – Dear M.F. (EP)
- 1995 – Ride Like Hell (EP)
- 1996 – Hemi-Vision
- 1998 – Heated
- 1999 – Chauffe à bloc (EP)
- 2000 – Extra Long Life (as Alkaline)
- 2001 – Brothers and Sisters, Are You Ready?
- 2001 – Brothers and Sisters, Êtes Vous Ready?
- 2003 – Hit & Run
- 2011 – Revolution Per Minute
- 2012 – Eliminate Ya! DVD live CD
- 2014 – Yardstyle
- 2015 – Calling All The Youth
- 2020 – Eternity Now

=== Sit Down Servant ===
- 2012 – I Was Just Trying To Help
- 2014 – Sit Down Servant

=== Grady ===
- 2006 – Y.U. So Shady?
- 2007 – A Cup of Cold Poison
- 2009 – Good As Dead

=== Wide Mouth Mason ===
- 2011 - No Bad Days

== See also ==
- Music of Canada
- Canadian rock
- List of Canadian musicians
