= Juno Award for Music DVD of the Year =

Canadian music award

The Juno Award for "Music DVD of the Year" has been awarded since 2004, as recognition each year for the best music DVD in Canada. It was discontinued in 2014.

== Winners ==
- 2004 — Rush/Andrew MacNaughtan/Daniel Catullo (directors) /Allan Weinrib/Pegi Cecconi/Ray Danniels (producers), Rush in Rio by Rush
- 2005 — Blue Rodeo/Ron Mann, In Stereovision by Blue Rodeo
- 2006 — The Tragically Hip/Pierre Lamoureux/François Lamoureux/Christopher Mills/Gord Downie/Allan Reid/Shawn Marino, Hipeponymous by The Tragically Hip
- 2007 — Sarah Harmer/Andy Keen/Patrick Sambrook/Bryan Bean, Escarpment Blues by Sarah Harmer
- 2008 — Billy Talent/Pierre Lamoureux/François Lamoureux/Pierre Tremblay/Steve Blair, 666 Live by Billy Talent
- 2009 — Blue Rodeo/Christopher Mills/Geoff McLean, Blue Road by Blue Rodeo
- 2010 — Iron Maiden/Stefan Demetriou/Sam Dunn/Scott McFadyen/Rod Smallwood/Andy Taylor, Iron Maiden: Flight 666 by Iron Maiden
- 2011 — Rush/Scot McFadyen/Sam Dunn/Pegi Cecconi/Shelley Nott/Noah Segal/John Virant, Rush: Beyond the Lighted Stage by Rush
- 2012 — Anthony Seck/Janine McInnes/Chip Sutherland, Feist: Look at What the Light Did Now by Feist
- 2013 — The Tragically Hip/Andy Keen/Bernie Breen/Patrick Sambrook/Shawn Marino, Bobcaygeon by The Tragically Hip
