= Lost Channels =

Studio album by Great Lake Swimmers
- Released: March 31, 2009 (Canada)
- Recorded: Thousand Islands
- Genre: Folk rock
- Length: 39:39
- Label: Nettwerk
- Producer: Andy Magoffin

Great Lake Swimmers chronology
Ongiara (2007)	Lost Channels (2009)	The Legion Sessions (2009)

Lost Channels is the fourth studio album by Canadian folk rock band Great Lake Swimmers, released on March 31, 2009. It was recorded in the Thousand Islands area near the New York–Ontario border and features several guest appearances by other artists, including Serena Ryder, Bob Egan (of Blue Rodeo), Erin Aurich (of A Northern Chorus) and Paul Aucoin (of The Hylozoists).

== Background and recording ==
Great Lake Swimmers, who are "notorious" for their unconventional recording locations, recorded Lost Channels in a variety of locations in and around the Thousand Islands, including Singer Castle near Hammond, New York. The band was originally invited to the Thousand Islands area by Ian Coristine, a historian and aerial photographer from the area, after he heard the band on Stuart McLean's radio program The Vinyl Cafe. When Tony Dekker and the band were prepared to record a new album, they accepted Coristine's invitation and asked him if there were any "interesting spaces in the area"; one of these suggested locations was Singer Castle. Despite a tight schedule and what Dekker called a "very limited amount of time and limited resources", part of the band managed to travel to the castle by boat and record the vocals and acoustic instruments for several tracks. Though most of the songs were already written by then, Dekker tried to "incorporate the mood and the imagery of the surroundings" and "capture a little bit of the energy of the place" into his songs; the track "Singer Castle Bells" actually consists entirely of the castle's hourly chimes. This incorporation was noted by Sarah Liss of the CBC, who wrote that "[t]he delicately layered banjo plucking and resonant Hammond organs that surge on the jubilant chorus of 'Pulling on a Line' draw you right into the room where the song was recorded."

The album itself is named for the Lost Channel, a spot in the Thousand Islands photographed by Coristine where a British naval boat with a crew of fourteen mysteriously vanished on August 14, 1760, because the band had "spent so much time [in the area], and made such an effort to record there". In addition to Singer Castle, the band also recorded in several locations in Ontario: the Brockville Arts Centre in Brockville, St. Brendan's Church in Rockport, the House of Miracles in London, Halla in Toronto, and the Lincoln County Social Club in Toronto.

Dekker has explained in concert that "Concrete Heart" was written for a project in which various Canadian musicians were asked to write songs about Toronto architecture, and "The Chorus in the Underground" was written about a concert by Canadian indie rock band A Northern Chorus.

== Reception ==
Professional ratings
Review scores
Source	Rating
Allmusic	4/5 stars
Eye Weekly	4/5 stars
PopMatters	(6/10)
Pitchfork Media	(7.2/10)
Toro	(7/10)

Lost Channels was called a "beautiful" album by both Uptown and The Georgia Straight and "pleasantly inoffensive and well-constructed" by Toro. The band's sound was compared to "the jangly folk-pop of Fleet Foxes [and] hushed intimacy of Iron & Wine".

A reviewer at the CBC praised the album as being the group's best, saying:

There's a magical, warm quality to the songs on Lost Channels, a richness and collective spirit that hasn't always been present in Great Lake Swimmers' songs. The Swimmers' first two albums, while still lovely, often felt a bit too breakable, that the airy arrangements supporting Dekker's plaintive confessionals might dissolve if you listened too hard. The seeds for a rootsier sound were planted on Ongiara and now they've come into full bloom.

The album was a shortlist nominee for the 2009 Polaris Music Prize.

== Track listing ==
1. "Palmistry" – 2:34
2. "Everything Is Moving So Fast" – 4:19
3. "Pulling on a Line" – 3:19
4. "Concrete Heart" – 3:31
5. "She Comes to Me in Dreams" – 4:03
6. "The Chorus in the Underground" – 3:21
7. "Singer Castle Bells" – 0:48
8. "Stealing Tomorrow" – 3:47
9. "Still" – 2:51
10. "New Light" – 3:20
11. "River's Edge" – 4:21
12. "Unison Falling Into Harmony" – 3:25

iTunes-only bonus tracks

13. "It's Too Late" – 3:49
14. "The Storms Are on the Ocean" – 4:05

== Personnel ==
- Erik Arnesen – twelve-string guitar, electric guitar, tenor banjo
- Paul Aucoin – vibraphone
- Erin Aurich – violin, backing vocals
- Tony Dekker – vocals, guitar, Hammond organ, piano
- Bob Egan – mandolin, pedal steel guitar
- Julie Fader – flute, backing vocals
- Andy Magoffin – Hammond organ
- Greg Millson – drums
- Justin Nace – dobro
- Mike Olsen – cello
- Serena Ryder – vocals
- Darcy Yates – bass, backing vocals
