= Are You Gone =

Studio album by Sarah Harmer
- Released: February 21, 2020
- Length: 41:32
- Label: Arts & Crafts Productions
- Producer: Marcus Paquin

Sarah Harmer chronology
| Oh Little Fire (2010) | Are You Gone (2020) |

Are You Gone is the sixth album by Canadian singer-songwriter Sarah Harmer, released on February 21, 2020. It is her first new album since Oh Little Fire in 2010, and was released on Arts & Crafts Productions.

Harmer has described the album as a spiritual successor to her 2000 album You Were Here. In an interview with CBC Music, she expanded on her reasons for viewing it that way, including the fact that both albums contain songs about deceased friends and both albums contain covers of songs written by her friend and colleague Dave Hodge.

Three weeks after the album's release was announced, Harmer also announced that she would promote it with her first large-scale tour in many years, featuring dates in both Canada and the United States. After the tour dates were postponed due to the COVID-19 pandemic, Harmer performed a live streamed home concert on Instagram and Facebook on March 26, 2020. In May she also participated in a livestreamed Juno Songwriters' Circle, alongside Dallas Green, Joel Plaskett and Buffy Sainte-Marie.

== Production ==
To produce the album, Harmer opted to work with Marcus Paquin, a producer she had not worked with before, on the grounds that having not recorded a full album in ten years, she wanted to "do this with somebody I have to be on my best game with." Paquin, conversely, described Harmer as "one of those artists [who] doesn't need a lot of bells and whistles for the songs to translate", and said that his main challenge in working on the album was trying not to overproduce or "step on" Harmer's material.

== Songs ==
The album's lead single was "New Low", which CBC Music described as "a fiery two-and-a-half minutes that the singer hopes will get 'people to their feet, and not only to dance'." Harmer described the song as having been inspired by the spirit of community activism that followed events such as the 2017 Quebec City mosque shooting. "St. Peter's Bay" followed on January 13, 2020.

"Just Get Here" is a new recording of a track Harmer originally released on the 2018 compilation album The Al Purdy Songbook, while "What I Was to You" is a tribute to her lifelong friendship with the late Gord Downie.

== Critical response ==
Professional ratings
Review scores
| Source | Rating |
|---|---|
| Entertainment Focus | 4/5 stars |
| The Spill Magazine | 4/5 stars |

The Spill Magazine called the album "a welcome one, a warm blanket on a cold day, a moment of solace amidst it all. Brimming with quality and every inch an impressive release". Vish Khanna of Exclaim! rated the album 9 out of 10, calling it "one of the most accomplished and affecting albums in her already remarkable catalogue". In a review for Entertainment Focus, Pip Ellwood-Hughes called the album "a welcome return for Sarah. She’s one of the most gifted storytellers in music and her music is always worthy of your time and attention."

The album received a Juno Award nomination for Adult Alternative Album of the Year at the Juno Awards of 2021.

== Track listing ==
1. "St. Peter's Bay" – 3:14
2. "New Low" – 2:39
3. "Just Get Here" – 3:41
4. "Take Me Out" – 2:22
5. "Squeaking Voices" – 3:51
6. "What I Was to You" – 4:15
7. "The Lookout" – 4:13
8. "Wildlife" (David Hodge) – 3:22
9. "Cowbirds" – 3:56
10. "Little Frogs" – 2:46
11. "Shoemaker" – 4:02
12. "See Her Wave (For Jacqui)" – 3:11

== Charts ==
Sales chart performance for Are You Gone
| Chart (2020) | Peak position |
|---|---|
| Canadian Albums (Billboard) | 63 |

== See also ==
- List of 2020 albums
