= All of Our Names =

Studio album by Sarah Harmer
- Released: March 23, 2004
- Recorded: 2003–2004
- Genre: Singer-songwriter
- Length: 44:05
- Label: Cold Snap Records/Universal Music Canada
- Producers: Sarah Harmer, Martin Kinack, Gavin Brown

Sarah Harmer chronology
| You Were Here (2000) | All of Our Names (2004) | I'm a Mountain (2005) |

All of Our Names is an album by Canadian singer-songwriter Sarah Harmer, released in 2004. It peaked at number 6 on the Top Canadian Albums chart and number 43 on the Billboard Top Heatseekers chart. "Almost" b/w "Pendulums" was released as a single with "Almost" reaching the top 20 on Canadian pop charts. A different version of the track "Silver Road", recorded with The Tragically Hip and for the soundtrack for the film Men with Brooms had been previously released as a single in 2003.

The album won the Juno Award for Adult Alternative Album of the Year at the Juno Awards of 2005.

== History ==
The album was recorded using Digital Performer at Harmer's home. Drums and bass and guitars were recorded together using different rooms, and the rest of the album was multi-tracked individually.

Guest musicians on the album include Howie Beck, Gavin Brown, Jim Bryson and Ian Thornley. Harmer plays a number of instruments on the album, including guitar, bass, and drums.

It was released in the U.S. on Zoë Records.

== Reception ==
Professional ratings
Review scores
| Source | Rating |
|---|---|
| Allmusic | 4.5/5 stars |
| Rolling Stone | 3/5 stars |
| Entertainment Weekly | B+ |
| No Depression | favorable |

Music critic Johnny Lofthus, writing for Allmusic, praised the album, calling it "homey and gorgeous" and calling Harmer's voice "starkly beautiful." "There's fully formed adult alternative stuff here, from the robust head-nod lilt of 'Almost' to 'New Enemy's more stately melody... This immediacy helps sell All of Our Names, since music like this can be smothered by over-production." Rolling Stone gave the album 3 of 5 stars, stating it is "suffused with a peaceful fatalism, a mood that's as casually downbeat as Harmer's overcast voice itself."

Entertainment Weekly gave All of Our Names a B+ rating, writing: "While it doesn't top her priceless 2000 debut, You Were Here, the fluid, moody Names comes respectably close. With a voice as silvery and luminous as a full moon, Harmer constructs daring metaphors to convey emotional perplexities... songs like the rueful 'Tether' display Harmer's gift for setting human drama to fresh melodies." Paul Cantin of No Depression praised the album and remarked on its themes of rural life and the outdoors, also writing "... while there's nothing here that quite reaches the dramatic punch of the latter album's standout songs... All Of Our Names confirms that Harmer is, by any other name, a formidable, singular talent who has amply rewarded the patience of her fans."

== Track listing ==
All songs written by Sarah Harmer.

1. "Pendulums" – 3:26
2. "Almost" – 3:57
3. "Greeting Card Aisle" – 4:37
4. "New Enemy" – 3:54
5. "Silver Road" – 3:38
6. "Dandelions in Bullet Holes" – 6:02
7. "Things to Forget" – 3:34
8. "Came on Lion" – 3:10
9. "Took it All" – 4:41
10. "Tether" – 3:21
11. "Go to Sleep" – 3:38

== Personnel ==
- Sarah Harmer – vocals, guitar, bass, piano, synthesizer, drums, glockenspiel, Wurlitzer, Juno
- Gavin Brown – guitar, drums, Wurlitzer, baritone guitar
- Howie Beck – bass, drums
- Jim Bryson – guitar
- Kevin Fox – cello
- Fuzzy – drums
- Maury LaFoy – bass, upright bass
- John Obercian – drums
- Benji Perosin – trumpet on "Came On Lion" and "Tether"
- Ian Thornley – guitar on "Pendulums"

== Production ==
- Produced by Sarah Harmer, Martin Kinack and Gavin Brown
- Engineered by Eric Ratz and Sarah Harmer
- Mixed by Eric Ratz, Gavin Brown and Sarah Harmer
- Mastered by Greg Calbi
- Art direction by Steven Jurgensmeyer and Sarah Harmer
- Cover photo by Andrew MacNaughten
