= Know Your Mushrooms =

- Directed by: Ron Mann
- Written by: Ron Mann
- Screenplay by: Ron Mann
- Produced by: Ron Mann
- Starring: Larry Evans; Gary Lincoff
- Cinematography: Andy Keen; Brian T. Moore
- Edited by: Simon Ennis; Nick Taylor
- Music by: The Flaming Lips
- Production company: Sphinx Productions
- Distributed by: Films We Like
- Release date: 5 December 2008
- Running time: 74 minutes
- Country: Canada
- Language: English

Know Your Mushrooms is a 2008 documentary film by Canadian director Ron Mann.

The 74 minute Sphinx Productions film examines the counterculture Telluride Mushroom Festival, held annually in Telluride, Colorado and some of the mycologists and funghiphiles that gather there such as Larry Evans and Gary Lincoff, author of seven mushroom identification guidebooks, including the Audubon Field Guide to Mushrooms.

The soundtrack includes music by the Flaming Lips and The Sadies.

Know Your Mushrooms is more about hard science and gourmet cuisine than space-outs and the munchies.

== Synopsis ==
Director Ron Mann and his partners at the first Telluride Mushroom Festival in Colorado, collect and consume mushrooms of every variety, particularly the aesthetically unappealing. Mushroom fans and fungi experts explore and investigate during the four-day festival. Gary Lincoff and mycologist Larry Evans lead a wild mushroom hunt.

- Day One: Displays of local mushrooms and cooking demonstrations.
- Day Two: Discussion and lecture.
- Day Three: Health effects of fungi and cultural roles. Discussion include mushroom's potential, for example, possible anti-cancer properties or mythological significance in shamanistic cultures.
- Day Four: A parade. Quizzes and short animations present controversial fungi, such as magic mushroom and fly agaric, the documentary provides an in-depth introduction to fungi.

== Cast ==
- Larry Evans as Larry Evans
- Gary Lincoff as Gary Lincoff
- Andrew Weil as Andrew Weil
- John Cage as John Cage
- Terence McKenna as Terence McKenna
- John Allegro as John Allegro
