= Chambers Corners =

Chambers Corners or Chambers Corner may refer to:

- Chambers Corner, New Jersey
- Chambers Corners, Ontario
