= Euringer =

Euringer is a surname. Notable people with the surname include:

- James Euringer (born 1969), known professionally as Jimmy Urine, American musician
- Jason Euringer (fl. 1999), Canadian musician
- Richard Euringer (1891-1953), German writer
