= Bodies and Minds =

Studio album by Great Lake Swimmers
- Released: March 15, 2005
- Recorded: St. Theresa's Church, Long Beach, Ontario
- Length: 46:36
- Label: Weewerk
- Producer: Tony Dekker

Great Lake Swimmers chronology
Great Lake Swimmers (2003)	Bodies and Minds (2005)	Ongiara (2007)

Professional ratings
Review scores
Source	Rating
Allmusic	4/5 stars
PopMatters	7/10 stars

Bodies and Minds is the second studio album by Canadian folk rock group Great Lake Swimmers, released in 2005.

Bodies and Minds was recorded in a lakeside church in Wainfleet, Ontario, continuing the emphasis on atmosphere from the debut album Great Lake Swimmers.

The album features gentle, thoughtful compositions and understated instrumentation, while also moving fluidly into alt-country pop territory with sweet harmonies, light orchestration, and even a few up-tempo numbers. The record includes songs about bipolar disorder ("Various Stages"), the sense of a higher power ("Song for the Angels") and finding spirituality in nature ("I Saw You in the Wild").

Guest musicians appearing on the album include Sandro Perri (of Polmo Polpo), Almog Ben-David on Wurlitzer piano and Colin Huebert on drums.

Bodies and Minds was released internationally in 2005: on March 15 on Weewerk in Canada; on April 4 on Fargo Records in Europe; in October on Speak N Spell in Australia; and on October 11 on Misra in the United States.

== Track listing ==
1. "Song for the Angels" - 5:19
2. "Let's Trade Skins" - 5:24
3. "When it Flows" - 3:34
4. "Various Stages" - 4:11
5. "Bodies and Minds" - 3:48
6. "To Leave it Behind" - 4:05
7. "Falling into the Sky" - 3:05
8. "Imaginary Bars" - 2:23
9. "I Saw You in the Wild" - 3:47
10. "I Could Be Nothing" - 5:16
11. "Long into the Evening" - 5:44
