= New Wild Everywhere =

Studio album by Great Lake Swimmers
- Released: April 3, 2012 (Canada)
- Recorded: Revolution Recording
- Genre: Folk rock
- Length: 53:42
- Label: Nettwerk
- Producer: Andy Magoffin

Great Lake Swimmers chronology
| The Legion Sessions (2009) | New Wild Everywhere (2012) | A Forest of Arms (2015) |

New Wild Everywhere is the fifth studio album by Canadian folk rock band Great Lake Swimmers, released April 3, 2012 on Nettwerk.

The album was recorded at Toronto's Revolution Recording studio, the first time the band has recorded in a traditional studio. However, in keeping with the band's more established process of recording in unconventional locations, one track, "The Great Exhale", was recorded in the Lower Bay station of the Toronto Transit Commission's subway system in Toronto. A preview track, "Easy Come Easy Go", was released in January 2012 and was the number-one song on the CBC Radio 3 R3-30 singles chart for the week ending on February 25.

The track "Les Champs de progéniture" is a French translation of another album track, "Fields of Progeny".

The album is also available in a "deluxe edition" for advance orders, featuring several live recordings and rarities.

The album debuted at number 33 on the Canadian Albums Chart. The album was named as a longlisted nominee for the 2012 Polaris Music Prize on June 14, 2012.

== Artwork ==
The artwork used throughout the layout of New Wild Everywhere was created by Midwest-based printmaker Nick Wroblewski. The woodcut print featured on the cover is entitled "Suspension of Disbelief".

== Track listing ==
All songs written by Tony Dekker, except as noted.

| No. | Title | Length |
|---|---|---|
| 1. | "Think That You Might Be Wrong" | 4:15 |
| 2. | "New Wild Everywhere" | 3:47 |
| 3. | "The Great Exhale" | 4:39 |
| 4. | "The Knife" | 4:23 |
| 5. | "Changes with the Wind" | 4:25 |
| 6. | "Cornflower Blue" | 4:07 |
| 7. | "Easy Come Easy Go" | 4:24 |
| 8. | "Fields of Progeny" | 2:57 |
| 9. | "Ballad of a Fisherman's Wife" | 3:18 |
| 10. | "Quiet Your Mind" | 4:51 |
| 11. | "Parkdale Blues" | 3:55 |
| 12. | "On the Water" | 5:33 |
| 13. | "Les Champs de progéniture" | 3:08 |

=== Deluxe edition ===
1. "New Wild Everywhere (Acoustic)"
2. "The Great Exhale (Demo)"
3. "Easy Come Easy Go (Acoustic)"
4. "Les Champs de progéniture"^{1}
5. "I Will Never See the Sun (TTC Version)"
6. "Something Heavy"
7. "What Was Going Through My Head" (Tom Hooper)
8. "Easy Come Easy Go (Radio Edit)"

=== Notes ===
^{1} In Canada, "Les Champs de progéniture" is included as the final track on the "regular edition" album, but appears on the bonus disc instead of the primary album in the "deluxe edition"; in all non-Canadian markets, the track appears only on the "deluxe edition" bonus disc.

== Personnel ==
- Tony Dekker - vocals and guitars
- Erik Arnesen - banjo and guitars
- Miranda Mulholland - backing vocals and violin
- Bret Higgins - upright bass
- Greg Millson - drums

Guest musicians:

- Paul Aucoin – vibraphone (11)
- Bryden Baird – fluegelhorn (4, 10)
- Michael Boguski – accordion (6, 9), Hammond organ (6), piano (7, 9)
- Bob Egan – pedal steel (5)
- Aleksandar Gajic – violin (1, 10)
- John Jowett – euphonium (4, 10)
- James MacDonald – French horn (4, 10)
- Andy Magoffin – backing vocals (7), baritone guitar (8)
- Karen Moffat – viola (1, 10)
- Mike Olsen – cello (1, 10)
- Joel Schwartz – dobro (5, 7), guitar (5, 6, 7), mandolin (6)
