= Shchelkanov =

Shchelkanov or Schelkanov (Russian: Щелканов) is a Russian masculine surname. It originates from the word shchelkach that refers to an arrogant, rude person, a bully. Its feminine counterpart is Shchelkanova or Schelkanova. The surname may refer to

- Ekaterina Shchelkanova (born 1970), Russian ballerina and singer
- Tatyana Shchelkanova (1937–2011), Soviet pentathlete
