= A Forest of Arms =

Studio album by Great Lake Swimmers
- Released: April 21, 2015 (Canada)
- Genre: Folk rock
- Label: Nettwerk

Great Lake Swimmers chronology
New Wild Everywhere (2012)	A Forest of Arms (2015)	The Waves, the Wake (2018)

Professional ratings
Review scores
Source	Rating
Exclaim!	8/10

A Forest of Arms is the sixth studio album by Canadian folk rock band Great Lake Swimmers, released April 21, 2015 on Nettwerk.

The album was recorded in a variety of locations, including the Tyendinaga Caves in Ontario's Hastings County. The songs were inspired in part by bandleader and songwriter Tony Dekker's experiences working with the World Wildlife Fund on environmental projects.

Guest musicians on the album include Kevin Kane of The Grapes of Wrath.

The track "Zero in the City" was released in February as a streaming preview.

== Track listing ==
All songs written by Tony Dekker.

1. "Something Like a Storm"
2. "Zero in the City"
3. "Shaking All Over"
4. "Don't Leave Me Hanging"
5. "One More Charge at the Red Cape"
6. "I Was a Wayward Pastel Bay"
7. "A Bird Flew Inside the House"
8. "A Jukebox in a Desert of Snow"
9. "I Must Have Someone Else's Blues"
10. "The Great Bear"
11. "With Every Departure"
12. "Expecting You"
