= Great Lake Swimmers (album) =

Studio album by Great Lake Swimmers
- Released: January 28, 2003
- Recorded: "In an abandoned grain silo," Wainfleet, Ontario, Canada
- Genre: Folk rock
- Length: 48:39
- Label: weewerk
- Producers: Victor Szabo, Tony Dekker

Great Lake Swimmers chronology
Great Lake Swimmers (2003)	Bodies and Minds (2005)

Professional ratings
Review scores
Source	Rating
Allmusic	4/5 stars
Pitchfork Media	(7.8/10)

Great Lake Swimmers (2003) is the debut studio album by the Canadian folk rock band Great Lake Swimmers.

The album was recorded over several months in an abandoned grain silo in Dekker's hometown of Wainfleet, Ontario.

Led by songwriter-vocalist Tony Dekker, their sound finds its roots in vintage folk and alt-country colourings, shaped by accordion and piano, lap steel and acoustic guitar.

The record was issued by weewerk in March 2003, in Europe by Fargo Records in March 2004, and Misra in the United States in April 2005.

== Track listing ==
1. "Moving Pictures, Silent Films" - 5:31
2. "The Man with No Skin" - 5:26
3. "Moving, Shaking" - 5:22
4. "Merge, A Vessel, A Harbour" - 4:44
5. "I Will Never See the Sun" - 3:35
6. "This Is Not Like Home" - 3:45
7. "The Animals of the World" - 5:31
8. "Faithful Night, Listening" - 4:08
9. "Three Days at Sea (Three Lost Years)" - 3:52
10. "Great Lake Swimmers" - 6:45
