= End of Silence =

End of Silence may refer to:

- End of Silence (Red album), 2006
- The End of Silence, a 1992 album by Rollins Band
- The End of Silence (2005 film), a 2005 Canadian film directed by Anita Doron
- The End of Silence (2011 film), a 2011 French film directed by Roland Edzard
