= Julie Fader =

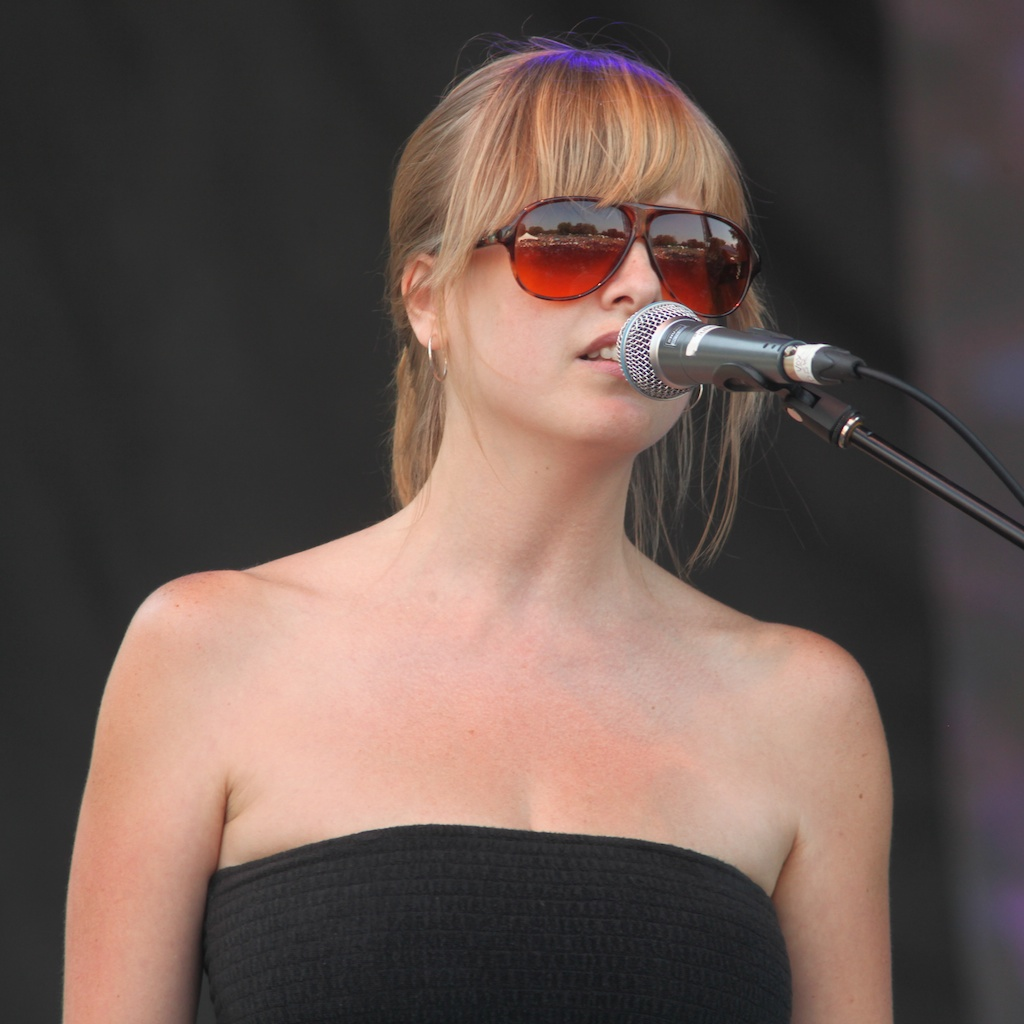
- Julie Fader playing with Sarah Harmer at the Greenbelt Harvest Picnic, August 27, 2011

Background information
- Origin: Hamilton, Ontario, Canada
- Genres: Folk; Pop
- Occupation: singer-songwriter
- Instrument(s): vocals, guitar, organ, flute, melodica
- Labels: Hand Drawn Dracula

Julie Fader is a Canadian musician, songwriter and visual artist best known as a keyboard player and backing vocalist for Sarah Harmer, Chad VanGaalen and Great Lake Swimmers. In September 2009, she released Outside In, her debut album as a solo artist.

Outside In was recorded and produced by Graham Walsh of Holy Fuck, and features guest appearances by Sarah Harmer, Chad VanGaalen, Tony Dekker and Erik Arnesen of Great Lake Swimmers, Justin Rutledge, Pete Hall of A Northern Chorus, and Brian Borcherdt of Holy Fuck.

She was previously the lead vocalist for Hamilton indie rock band Flux A.D. Her bandmates included Graham Walsh, Bill Majoros of The Foreign Films, Erin Aurich of A Northern Chorus and Hey Rosetta!, and Joel Stouffer of Dragonette. At the time, she was credited as Julie MacDonald.

== Discography ==
- Outside In (2009)

=== Guest appearances ===
- Sarah Harmer, I'm a Mountain (2005)
- Chad VanGaalen, Soft Airplane (2008)
- Attack in Black, Years (by One Thousand Fingertips) (2008)
- Baby Eagle/Attack in Black split (2008)
- Great Lake Swimmers, Lost Channels (2009)
- SunBear, Sun Streaming In (2009)
- Cuff the Duke, Way Down Here (2009)
- Blue Rodeo, The Things We Left Behind (2009)
- Evening Hymns, Spirit Guides (2009)
- Justin Rutledge, The Early Widows (2010)
- Sarah Harmer, Oh Little Fire (2010)
