= Escarpment Blues =

- Directed by: Andy Keen
- Produced by: Bryan Bean; Sarah Harmer
- Starring: Jason Euringer; Spencer Winston Evans; Julie Fader; Sarah Harmer
- Cinematography: Andy Keen
- Edited by: Andy Keen
- Release date: October 31, 2006
- Running time: 61 minutes
- Country: Canada
- Language: English

Escarpment Blues is a Canadian concert and documentary film starring singer-songwriter Sarah Harmer. Directed by Andy Keen and produced by Keen, Harmer, Bryan Bean and Patrick Sambrook, it was released theatrically in 2006.

In June 2005, Harmer launched a tour, called I Love the Escarpment, across southern Ontario to promote Protecting Escarpment Rural Land (PERL), a conservation group she cofounded to battle a proposed quarry development on the Niagara Escarpment near her hometown of Burlington. Harmer toured communities near the escarpment, both performing and speaking about the PERL campaign. The film documents both her live performances and her activist work from the tour, and takes its name from "Escarpment Blues", a song from her 2005 album I'm a Mountain.

Poet Tanis Rideout also participated in the PERL tour and appears in the film.

Escarpment Blues won the award for Best Music DVD at the 2007 Juno Awards.
