= Songs for Clem =

Studio album by Sarah Harmer
- Released: 1999
- Recorded: 1998
- Genre: Rock
- Length: 32:00
- Label: Cold Snap Records/Universal Music Canada
- Producer: Jason Euringer, Sarah Harmer

Sarah Harmer chronology
This Great Black Night (1998)	Songs for Clem (1999)	You Were Here (2000)

Songs for Clem is an album by Canadian singer-songwriter by Sarah Harmer, credited to Harmer and Jason Euringer, and released in 1999.

== History ==
The album was never intended by Harmer for widespread release, but as a 1998 Christmas gift for her father, Clem Harmer. It features Harmer's personal, home-recorded renditions of several of her father's favourite pop and country standards. Upon hearing the recording, Harmer's friends and family convinced her to release it independently. She did so in 1999; following her commercial breakthrough in 2000 with You Were Here, the album was re-released under Harmer's new major label distribution deal with Universal Music Canada.

Clem Harmer subsequently appeared on Sarah's 2005 album I'm A Mountain, contributing backing vocals to two songs.

== Reception ==
Professional ratings
Review scores
Source	Rating
Allmusic	4.5/5 stars

Allmusic music critic Johnny Lofthus wrote the album feels "lovingly handmade, with cover art right out of a child's Father's Day art project and an immediate, field-type recording quality that features accompaniment from crickets and a passing rainstorm. This isn't to say it's lo-fi; on the contrary, it's crystal clear." and that "... it's a true sentimental journey for people inspired by their parents to love music."

== Track listing ==
1. "Blue Moon of Kentucky" (Bill Monroe) – 2:07
2. "Tennessee Waltz" (Redd Stewart, Pee Wee King) – 2:52
3. "Black Coffee" (Sonny Burke, Paul Francis Webster) – 2:53
4. "Stormy Weather" (Harold Arlen, Ted Koehler) – 3:00
5. "Oh Bury Me Not" (Traditional) – 1:25
6. "Just a Closer Walk With Thee" (Traditional) – 3:22
7. "Shine on Harvest Moon" (Jack Norworth, Nora Bayes) – 2:13
8. "Trouble in the Fields" (Nanci Griffith, Rick West) – 4:02
9. "Your Cheatin' Heart" (Hank Williams) – 2:32
10. "Summertime" (George Gershwin, DuBose Heyward, Ira Gershwin) – 3:45
11. "Sentimental Journey" (Les Brown, Ben Homer, Bud Green) – 2:44
12. "O, My Beloved Father" (Giacomo Puccini, Giovacchino Forzano) – 2:07

== Personnel ==
- Sarah Harmer – vocals, guitar, piano, harmonica
- Jason Euringer – bass, guitar, background vocals, slides
- Spencer Evans – clarinet, piano, background vocals
- Benji Perosin – trumpet

== Production ==
- Produced by Sarah Harmer
- Mastered by Jan Turney and Graeme McCann
- Engineered and mixed by Robin Aube, assisted by Tom Lawless
- Photography by Kelsey Finlayson
