= The Waves, the Wake =

Studio album by Great Lake Swimmers
- Released: August 17, 2018 (Canada)
- Genre: Folk rock
- Label: Nettwerk

Great Lake Swimmers chronology
A Forest of Arms (2015)	The Waves, the Wake (2018)	Uncertain Country (2023)

Professional ratings
Review scores
Source	Rating
AllMusic	3.5/5
Exclaim!	8/10
Paste	6.7

The Waves, the Wake is the seventh studio album by Canadian indie folk band Great Lake Swimmers, released August 17, 2018 on Nettwerk. The album was marked by a shift in the band's traditional folk rock instrumentation, with bandleader Tony Dekker choosing to avoid acoustic guitar and instead incorporating instruments including marimba, flute, pipe organ, harp, congas, vibraphone and lute to expand the band's sound.

The album was preceded by Side Effects, an EP which previewed three tracks from the album alongside three songs from their prior catalogue.

In November 2019, the band released an acoustic reinterpretation of the album.

== Track listing ==
All songs written by Tony Dekker.

1. "The Talking Wind"
2. "In a Certain Light"
3. "Alone but Not Alone"
4. "Falling Apart"
5. "Side Effects"
6. "The Real Work"
7. "Root Systems"
8. "Unmaking the Bed"
9. "Visions of a Different World"
10. "Holding Nothing Back"
11. "Mouth of Flames"
12. "The Open Sea"
