= Oh Little Fire =

Studio album by Sarah Harmer
- Released: June 22, 2010
- Genre: Indie rock
- Length: 34:07
- Label: Cold Snap Records/Universal Music Canada
- Producers: Sarah Harmer, Gavin Brown

Sarah Harmer chronology
I'm a Mountain (2005)	Oh Little Fire (2010)	Are You Gone (2020)

Oh Little Fire is the fifth album by Canadian singer-songwriter Sarah Harmer, released in 2010. It is her first album of new material since 2005's Polaris Music Prize-nominated I'm a Mountain. The album debuted at #7 on the Canadian Albums Chart and #24 on the US Heatseekers Chart.

== History ==
In the five years prior to Oh Little Fire, Harmer was involved with environmental activism and made guest appearances on albums of Bruce Cockburn, Neko Case, Blue Rodeo, The Weakerthans, and Great Big Sea.

Recorded in a Toronto warehouse and part recorded in a house on Lake Ontario's Wolfe Island, Harmer says the home recording gave some of the songs "a different, kind of country feel." Harmer played much of the album's instrumentation herself.

Guest musicians on the album include Neko Case, Julie Fader and James Shaw of the band Metric.

Harmer was nominated in four categories for the 2011 Juno Awards.

It was released in the U.S. on Zoë Records.

== Reception ==
Professional ratings
Review scores
Source	Rating
Allmusic	4/5 stars
Coke Machine Glow	65%
musicOMH	4/5 stars
Paste	6.8/10
The Washington Post	(no rating)

Music critic James Christopher, writing for Allmusic wrote: "Harmer's winning blend of country, folk, and indie pop is propelled, in part, by her even, expressive tenor... Likable and accessible, it would be easy to write her off as just another capable singer/songwriter in an industry stuffed to the rafters with capable singer/songwriters, were it not for her ability to take a simple melody and turn it into something special. Oh Little Fire is filled with those moments... It’s a subtle record to be sure, but one that rewards those who are willing to take the time to let it enter the bloodstream."

Michael Joyce of The Washington Post praised the album, writing "...she's still capable of coming up with poetic musings perfectly suited to her wistful soprano, as the minor-key ballad "New Loneliness" illustrates. (A cover of "Silverado," a soulful duet with Neko Case, is even better.) But this time Harmer casually asserts her pop passions with songs that bounce, spin and charm. More often than not, the best of them boast lyrics that are succinct and disarming... Perhaps best of all, "Oh Little Fire" is likely to wear well, adding a vibrant pop pulse to Harmer's concerts for years to come."

musicOMH gave the albums 4 of 5 stars and wrote "Oh Little Fire is a perfectly packaged container for pop gems, and Harmer falls right in place in the midst of such a sugar-sweet and swooning backdrop. Oh Little Fire is an unexpected turn in Sarah Harmer's musical progression, to be sure. But as such, it blindsides the listener with its carefully crafted and deftly executed sense of melody and meaning."

Paste magazine was less enthusiastic and called it "a collection of poppy tracks that earns its title—failing to ignite any blazing passions, these songs instead evoke the familiar warmth of a smoldering campfire." and noted that "one of the prevailing characteristics of these eleven songs is that they mostly lack a distinctive style, erring instead toward the kind of spiceless pleasantness that would make Harmer’s music easy to slip into pop-country radio rotation. The real treasures here are her lyrics, in which she confronts such themes as regret and self-absorption with a maturity that sets her apart from the rest of the “accessible” crowd." In their Indieclick review, Coke Machine Glow was also unenthusiastic, and while praising the recorded sound, called it "the latest in a drawn-out series of diminished returns... Those still holding out hope for a full-on return to form a long five years since I’m a Mountain seemingly set it in motion, no such luck: in repeating many of the same pros and cons of her last two albums, Oh Little Fire is another pleasant collection of very okay folk, country, and radio rock. It’s actually pretty good for an album that appears to aim for nothing more and nothing less, but…well, that I can’t think of a better compliment pretty much sums it up."

== Track listing ==
All songs written by Sarah Harmer, except as noted.

1. "The Thief" – 3:25
2. "Captive" – 2:33
3. "New Loneliness" – 3:14
4. "One Match" – 3:12
5. "Careless" – 3:55
6. "Washington" – 3:46
7. "Late Bloomer" – 4:09
8. "The City" – 2:30
9. "Silverado" (Trevor Henderson) – 2:41
10. "The Marble in Your Eye" – 2:43
11. "It Will Sail" – 1:59

iTunes-only bonus tracks

12. "New Loneliness (Acoustic Version)"
13. "The City (Acoustic Version)"
14. "Our Dark Clouds"

== Personnel ==
- Sarah Harmer – vocals, drums, guitar, Mellotron, organ, Wurlitzer
- Gavin Brown – drums, ruitar, Mellotron, piano, tambourine, Wurlitzer
- Kieran Adams – drums, drum fills, percussion
- Bryden Baird – trumpet
- Chris Brown – clavinet, organ
- Burke Carroll – pedal steel
- Neko Case – vocals
- Steve Donald – trombone
- Dean Drouillard – guitar
- Spencer Evans – clarinet
- Julie Fader – harmony vocals
- Kevin Fox – cello
- Trevor Henderson – lap Steel Guitar
- Paul Mathew – double bass
- Marc Rogers – bass, double bass
- Jimmy Shaw – guitar, vocal harmony
- Perry White – clarinet

Production notes:

- Sarah Harmer – producer
- Gavin Brown – producer, engineer
- Virginia Clark – photography
- Lenny DeRose – engineer, mixing
- Noah Mintz – mastering
- Dave Mohacis – engineer
- Jud Haynes – art direction, layout
