= The Saddletramps =

- Also known as: Tin Mitten
- Origin: Toronto, Ontario, Canada
- Genres: Alternative country
- Years active: 1980s–1995
- Past members: Ken Horne; Andrew Lindsay; John DeHaas; Brian Duguay; Sarah Harmer; Mia Basso

The Saddletramps were an alternative country band from Toronto, Ontario, in the 1980s and 1990s. Core members of the band included Ken Horne, Andrew Lindsay, John DeHaas, and Brian Duguay, although the band is now most noted for the early participation of singer-songwriter Sarah Harmer.

== History ==
In the early 1980s, several Fanshawe College students from the Greater Toronto Area who shared a rented house in London, Ontario got together to form the band Tin Mitten. The band was soon renamed The Saddletramps, after deciding that the name Tin Mitten, which had been conceived as a parody of a heavy metal band name, didn't fit their actual style.

Lindsay met seventeen-year-old Sarah Harmer while working at Sunrise Records in Burlington, and she joined the band, later commuting to Toronto to perform on weekends while attending Queen's University.

In 1989, the Saddletramps released their first album, The Saddle Tramps, on cassette tape, with Dehaas on bass, Duguay on lead guitar and vocals, Harmer on vocals, Horne on percussion, Lindsay on vocals and guitar. Mike Northcott also contributed some instrumental work. The album was recorded at Grant Ave and Axon Studios, and all but one of the songs were written by the band members.

In 1990, the band released a second cassette album, Yardsale. Harmer left to concentrate on her studies after Yardsale, and later started her own band, Weeping Tile. She was briefly replaced by Mia Basso as the band's new vocalist, although Basso was no longer in the band by the time of their 1993 album Well Gone Bad, on which all vocals were performed by Lindsay and Duguay. That album, their only one to receive full national commercial distribution, was produced by Ken Greer.

The Saddletramps disbanded in 1995.

== Post-breakup ==
In 1999, following Weeping Tile's breakup, Harmer began a solo career; her solo album You Were Here included a new recording of "Don't Get Your Back Up", which she had originally recorded with The Saddletramps on Yardsale.

Lindsay, Duguay, and Dehaas formed a new band called Loomer along with Michael Taylor, Iain Thomson, and Scott Loomer. The band released an album, Love Is A Dull Instrument in 2004. They followed up in 2006 with Songs of the Wild West Island, which included a guest appearance by Harmer as a duet vocalist on "Only Lovers".

Andrew Lindsay died in May 2023.

== Discography ==
=== Albums ===
- The Saddle Tramps (1989) Tracks: "Christ", "Life and Times", "Church", "Winds of Change", "Alaska", "I Don't Mind", "Blue Eyes" and "Fallen Angel"
- Yardsale (1990) Tracks: "Weight of the World", "Deal With It", "Boomerang", "4000 Roads", "She Don't Love", "Rain of Gold", "Wastin' It On You", "Race Along The Edge", "Passin' Thru", "Don't Get Your Back Up"
- Well Gone Bad (1993)
