= Tanis Rideout =

Canadian writer

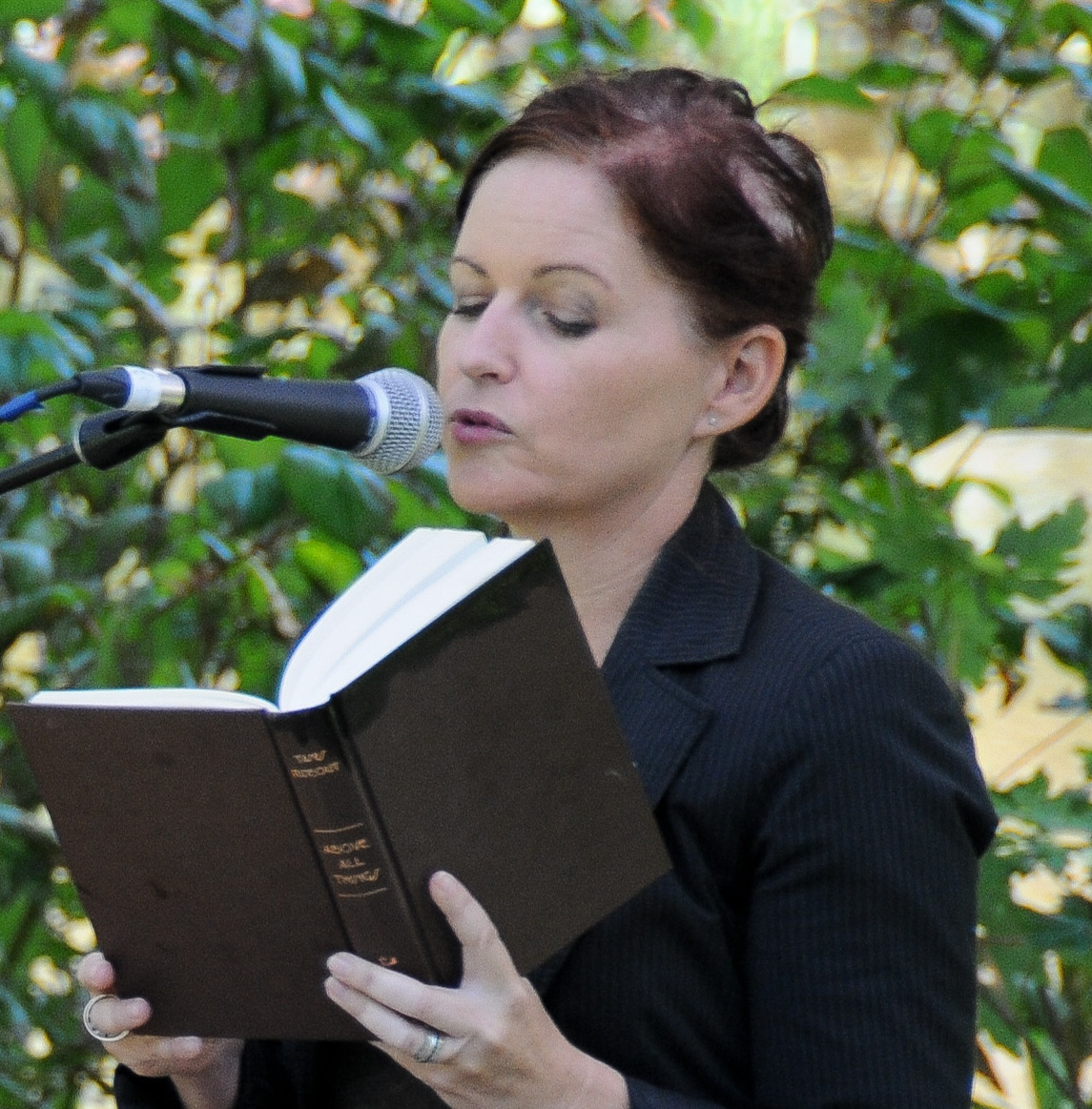
Rideout at the Eden Mills Writers' Festival in 2012

Tanis Rideout is a Canadian writer based in Toronto, Ontario.

== Biography ==
Born in Belgium, Rideout grew up in Bermuda and Canada, particularly Kingston, Ontario where she became involved with the music scene. Rideout has often been referred to as the "Poet Laureate of CanRock."

She has performed on CBC Radio, BookTelevision, ZeD and Citytv. She has toured extensively in North America. Her work has appeared in a range of quarterlies and magazines including A Room of One's Own, Black Heart Magazine, grey borders, Spire, Pontiac Quarterly, Fireweed, echolocation, Witual and Chart, and has been short-listed for a number of prizes, including the Bronwen Wallace Memorial Award, and has received a grant from the Toronto Arts Council.

In the spring of 2005, Rideout joined Sarah Harmer to read her poetry on Harmer's I Love the Escarpment Tour to draw attention to damage being done to the Niagara Escarpment by ongoing quarrying, and appears in the 2006 June award-winning documentary Escarpment Blues. In August 2006 she was named the Poet Laureate for Lake Ontario by the Lake Ontario Waterkeeper and joined Gord Downie (of Canadian band The Tragically Hip) on a tour to promote environmental justice on the lake.

In 2010, Rideout won second prize in the CBC Literary Awards for her poems about Marilyn Bell. Her first novel, Above All Things, was released in Canada in 2012, and in the US and UK in 2013.

== Books ==
- Above All Things, McClelland & Stewart, 2012, ISBN 0-77107-635-5
- Arguments with the Lake, Wolsak & Wynn Publishers, 2013, ISBN 1-89498-771-3
