= The Legion Sessions =

EP by Great Lake Swimmers
- Released: September 2009
- Recorded: February 2009
- Genre: Folk rock
- Label: Nettwerk

Great Lake Swimmers chronology
Lost Channels (2009)	The Legion Sessions (2009)	New Wild Everywhere (2012)

The Legion Sessions is a live EP by Canadian folk rock band Great Lake Swimmers, released in September 2009.

Prior to the release of their 2009 album Lost Channels, the band rented a Royal Canadian Legion hall to record a number of live renditions of songs from the album.

Throughout the year, individual videos from the session were posted to Internet video sites such as YouTube and Vimeo, as well as being made available for sale from iTunes. The full performance was subsequently released as an EP on iTunes in September 2009, and was released to other online music retailers on October 20. A limited edition CD was also released in 2010 in conjunction with Record Store Day.

== Track listing ==
1. "Palmistry"
2. "Everything Is Moving So Fast"
3. "Pulling on a Line"
4. "Concrete Heart"
5. "She Comes to Me in Dreams"
6. "The Chorus in the Underground"
7. "Stealing Tomorrow"
8. "Still"
9. "New Light"
