= Doug Paisley =

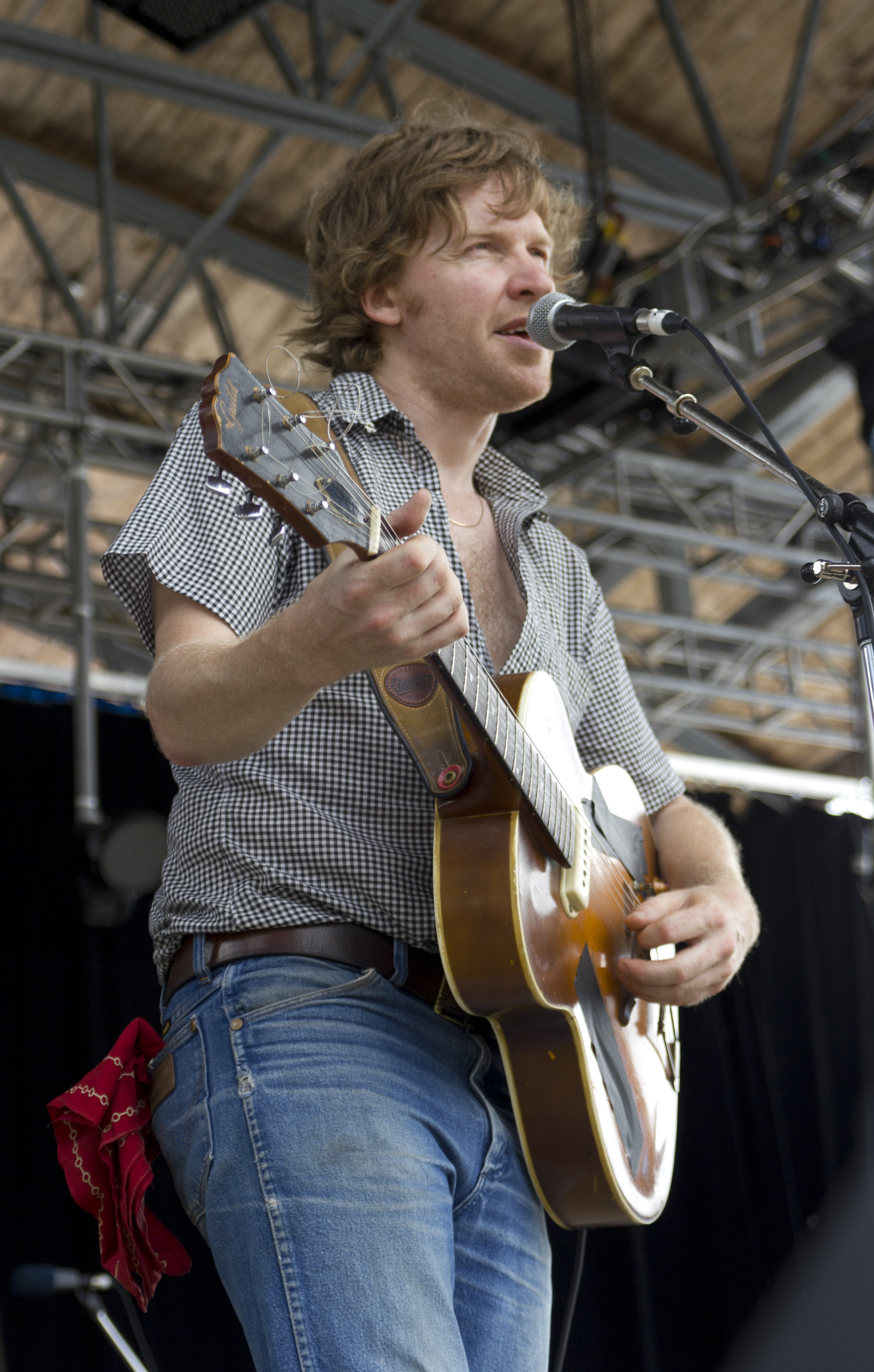
- Paisley performing at the 2011 Hillside Festival

Background information
- Born: Douglas K. S. Paisley
- Origin: Toronto, Ontario, Canada
- Genres: Folk, country
- Instruments: Vocals, guitar
- Labels: No Quarter Records, Outside Music
- Formerly of: Dark Hand and Lamplight, Russian Literature, Stanley Brothers: A Loving Tribute, Live Country Music

Douglas K. S. Paisley is a Canadian alternative country singer and songwriter, formerly with record label No Quarter Records and now with Outside Music. He was born in Toronto.

Paisley's "What About Us?" was featured in Mojo magazine as part of a complimentary CD entitled New Harvest. Paisley had previously toured with Bonnie Prince Billy under the name Dark Hand and Lamplight with artist Shary Boyle. Boyle would illuminate her art in the background while Paisley played the guitar and sang his songs. The pairing received recognition when they were selected to showcase at the Brooklyn Academy of Music in 2008. Doug performed for ten years alongside Chuck Erlichman as a duo entitled Russian Literature and as a tribute act entitled Stanley Brothers.

Paisley's released his first solo album, Doug Paisley, in 2008. Paisley's 2010 release Constant Companion received positive reviews in major publications such as The New Yorker and Spin.

Paisley has been featured both on CBC Radio in Canada and on National Public Radio in the United States.

His 2014 album Strong Feelings featured guest appearances by Mary Margaret O'Hara and Garth Hudson. It received positive reviews from Rolling Stone and Pitchfork.

In 2018 Paisley released the album Starter Home, which the New Yorker praised for its "enriching" songwriting.[9] Paisley's also contributed the song "Transient" to the compilation album The Al Purdy Songbook.

In November 2022, Paisley announced his forthcoming album, Say What You Like, which was released March 17, 2023 to positive reviews in Pitchfork, and elsewhere.

On January 19, 2024, Paisley self-released an album of country covers called Sad Old World. Paisley followed that album with the May 2, 2025 release of rough-hewn original songs on the album Rough Master.

== Albums ==
- Doug Paisley (No Quarter 2008)
- Digging in the Ground (EP, Download)
- Constant Companion (No Quarter 2010)
- No One But You / If I Wanted To (Heavenly, UK 7″ 45 RPM 2011)
- Golden Embers (EP, No Quarter 2012)
- Strong Feelings (No Quarter 2014)
- Until I Find You (EP, No Quarter 2014)
- Starter Home (No Quarter 2018)
- Say What You Like (Outside Music, 2023)
- Sad Old World (self-released, 2024)
- Rough Master (self-released, 2025)
