= Strong Feelings =

Studio album by Doug Paisley
- Released: January 21, 2014
- Genre: Country
- Length: 39:14
- Label: No Quarter

Doug Paisley chronology
Constant Companion (2010)	Strong Feelings (2014)

Professional ratings
Aggregate scores
Source	Rating
Metacritic	80/100
Review scores
Source	Rating
Allmusic	3.5/5 stars
Consequence of Sound	C+

Strong Feelings is the third studio album by country musician Doug Paisley. It was released in January 2014 under No Quarter Records.

== Track listing ==
No.	Title	Length
1.	"Radio Girl"	4:37
2.	"Song My Love Can Sing"	4:04
3.	"It's Not Too Late (To Say Goodbye)"	4:42
4.	"Our Love"	3:09
5.	"What's Up Is Down"	5:26
6.	"Old Times"	3:01
7.	"Growing Souls"	3:21
8.	"To and Fro"	4:09
9.	"Where the Lights Take You"	4:30
10.	"Because I Love You"	2:15
