= The End of Silence (2005 film) =

- Directed by: Anita Doron
- Written by: Anita Doron
- Produced by: Anita Doron; Erin Faith Young
- Starring: Ekaterina Shchelkanova; John Tokatlidis; Sarah Harmer
- Cinematography: Anita Doron
- Edited by: Duncan Christie
- Music by: Fernando Albert Yu
- Production companies: Faith Films; Riverside Entertainment
- Distributed by: Mongrel Media
- Release date: December 2005 (Whistler)
- Running time: 94 minutes
- Country: Canada
- Languages: English; Russian

The End of Silence is a 2005 Canadian romantic drama film, directed by Anita Doron. The film stars Ekaterina Shchelkanova as Darya, a Russian ballerina who decides to abandon her dance company after an argument with her director (Max Ratevosian) while on tour in Toronto; without money and with very little knowledge of English to communicate, she is preparing to return home to Russia on her own when she meets Eddie (John Tokatlidis), who becomes a love interest despite their communication barriers.

The film also stars Sarah Harmer as Nora, Eddie's ex-wife who remains friendly with him despite their separation, and who also becomes a friend and employer to Darya.

== Production ==
Doron stated that she was interested in making a film about communicating through and around silence, as well as in depicting a strong, healthy and supportive friendship between women rather than the more common filmic depiction of female friendships as competitive or duplicitous. She has also stated that she was influenced by the video diaries of Jim Jarmusch.

The film was Harmer's first-ever acting role. Despite her renown as a musician, however, she did not contribute music to the film's soundtrack, as she and Doron agreed on the importance of maintaining a separation between Harmer's music and acting; however, her real-life friends Tanis Rideout, Luther Wright and Chris Brown have small roles in the film as friends of Nora's. Harmer has also stated that she played Nora as a more repressed and uptight version of herself, rather than trying to create a character more dissimilar to herself.

== Distribution ==
The film premiered in the Borsos Competition program at the 2005 Whistler Film Festival. It was subsequently screened at the 2006 Canadian Filmmakers Festival, where it won the award for Best Feature Film.
