= I'm a Mountain =

Studio album by Sarah Harmer
- Released: November 15, 2005
- Recorded: July 2005
- Genre: Singer-songwriter
- Length: 40:31
- Label: Cold Snap Records
- Producer: Sarah Harmer, Martin Kinack, Gavin Brown

Sarah Harmer chronology
All of Our Names (2004)	I'm a Mountain (2005)	Oh Little Fire (2010)

I'm a Mountain is an album by Canadian singer-songwriter Sarah Harmer, released in 2005. She received three Juno Award nominations for her work on the album.

== History ==
Unlike her two previous albums, You Were Here and All of Our Names, I'm a Mountain is an acoustic folk and bluegrass album, for the most part. The instrumentation on the album consists mainly of acoustic guitars, double basses, fiddles, mandolins, and percussion. The entire album was completed in one week. Harmer noted this was due to most of the material having been previously worked out during her latest tour. Harmer stated in a Billboard magazine interview: "There's nothing like confidence when you [are] in the studio. We were feeling really good." No single was released and the complete album was shipped to radio stations playing music in Americana, bluegrass and folk formats.

Some of the songs were written as early as 1998 and others just prior to recording. All the songs but two were recorded live in the studio. Two songs on the album, "Oleander" and "Goin' Out", feature Harmer's father Clem on backing vocals.

Harmer grew up near the Niagara Escarpment in southern Ontario, and learning of the threat of development there, she began to raise awareness about the situation. The song "Escarpment Blues" was written to present Harmer's concern over its future.

The album was nominated for the 2006 Polaris Music Prize, a jury-selected $20,000 cash prize for the Canadian album of the year. In February 2007, Harmer received three Juno Award nominations at the Juno Awards of 2007. I'm a Mountain was nominated for Best Adult Alternative Album and her DVD Escarpment Blues for Best Music DVD. Harmer herself was nominated for Songwriter of the Year for her work on "I Am Aglow", "Oleander" and "Escarpment Blues".

It would be five years before Harmer's next release.

== Reception ==
Professional ratings
Review scores
Source	Rating
Allmusic	4/5 stars
Billboard	(no rating)
Entertainment Weekly	B+

Music critic Marisa Brown, writing for Allmusic noted the traditional tone of I'm a Mountain and wrote: "The musicianship on the entire album is fantastic, especially the guitar, which ranges in style from Lynyrd Skynyrd-type riffs to bluegrass fingerpicking with a classical bent. Harmer's lyrics also show this versatility." She also writes "Harmer occasionally falls victim to the folksinger's greatest vice, the overextended metaphor, but for the most part her lyrics are direct and personal without being too sentimental, and her melodies are tuneful and catchy but not too predictable... it is Harmer's voice that her fans want to listen to, and I'm a Mountain delivers that perfectly."

Billboard magazine's review singled out several songs, writing "Harmer's ongoing personal discovery has been a joy through these past few years, and with this latest turn is no different."

Entertainment Weekly gave the album a B+ rating, specifically praising Harmer's cover of Dolly Parton's "Will He Be Waiting for Me", writing: "The soothing lo-fi-ness of Sarah Harmer's folk-country tunes, and her warm crystal-clear vocals... offer a lovely respite."

== Track listing ==
All tracks written by Harmer except as noted.

1. "The Ring" – 3:09
2. "I am Aglow" – 2:44
3. "Oleander" – 3:28
4. "I'm a Mountain" – 3:09
5. "Goin' Out" – 4:56
6. "Will He be Waiting for Me" (Dolly Parton) – 3:36
7. "Escarpment Blues" – 4:01
8. "The Phoenix" – 3:55
9. "Salamandre" (Chris Brown, Kate Fenner) – 2:37
10. "Luther's Got the Blues" (Luther Wright) – 3:50
11. "How Deep in the Valley" – 5:07

== Personnel ==
- Sarah Harmer – vocals, guitar
- Chris Bartos – fiddle
- Willie P. Bennett – harmonica
- Luther Wright – banjo, harmonica, harmony vocals
- Dan Curtis – guitar
- John Dinsmore – bass
- Jason Euringer – harmony vocals, upright bass
- Spencer Evans – clarinet, piano, accordion
- Dean Stone – percussion
- Clem Harmer – harmony vocals

== Production ==
- Produced by Sarah Harmer, Martin Kinack and Gavin Brown
- Mixed by Denis Tougas and Martin Kinack
- Engineered by Denis Tougas and Martin Kinack
- Mastered by Joao Carvalho
