= Ongiara =

Studio album by Great Lake Swimmers
- Released: March 27, 2007
- Recorded: Aeolian Hall; London, Ontario
- Genre: Folk rock
- Length: 43:21
- Label: Nettwerk
- Producer: Andy Magoffin

Great Lake Swimmers chronology
Bodies and Minds (2005)	Ongiara (2007)	Lost Channels (2009)

Professional ratings
Review scores
Source	Rating
Allmusic	3.5/5 stars
Pitchfork Media	5.5/10 stars
PopMatters	9/10 stars

Ongiara is the third studio album by Canadian folk rock band Great Lake Swimmers, released in Canada on March 27, 2007 and in the United States on May 8, 2007. The album was released on Nettwerk.

The band recorded most of the album in London, Ontario's historic music venue Aeolian Hall with producer Andy Magoffin.

The title Ongiara was the name of the boat that ferried the band to Toronto Island, where they recorded the initial demo. "Ongiara" is also the original name for Niagara Falls; although Dekker grew up in Ontario's Niagara Region, he did not know the word's meaning until after selecting the album title based on the name of the boat. The name is said to have originated from the Iroquois word Onguiaahra and the local tribe of Iroquois inhabitants known as the Ongiaras.

Guest musicians appearing on the album include Serena Ryder, Sarah Harmer, Owen Pallett and Bob Egan.

Ongiara was available for purchase on iTunes during March 2007, before its scheduled release on March 27. The song "Your Rocky Spine" reached #1 on CBC Radio 3's The R3-30 charts the week of June 14, 2007.

The song "Changing Colors" has been covered by American pop singer Josh Groban. Groban used the song as the opening song on his 2011 "Straight To You Tour."

== Reception ==
The album received a positive review from Vue Weekly, which praised the "stellar songcraft".

== Track listing ==
1. "Your Rocky Spine" – 3:36
2. "Backstage with the Modern Dancers" – 4:28
3. "Catcher Song" – 4:11
4. "Changing Colours" – 4:44
5. "There Is a Light" – 5:06
6. "Put There by the Land" – 2:43
7. "I Am Part of a Large Family" – 4:23
8. "Where in the World Are You" – 3:49
9. "Passenger Song" – 4:28
10. "I Became Awake" – 5:53
