= Andy Keen =

Canadian documentary filmmaker

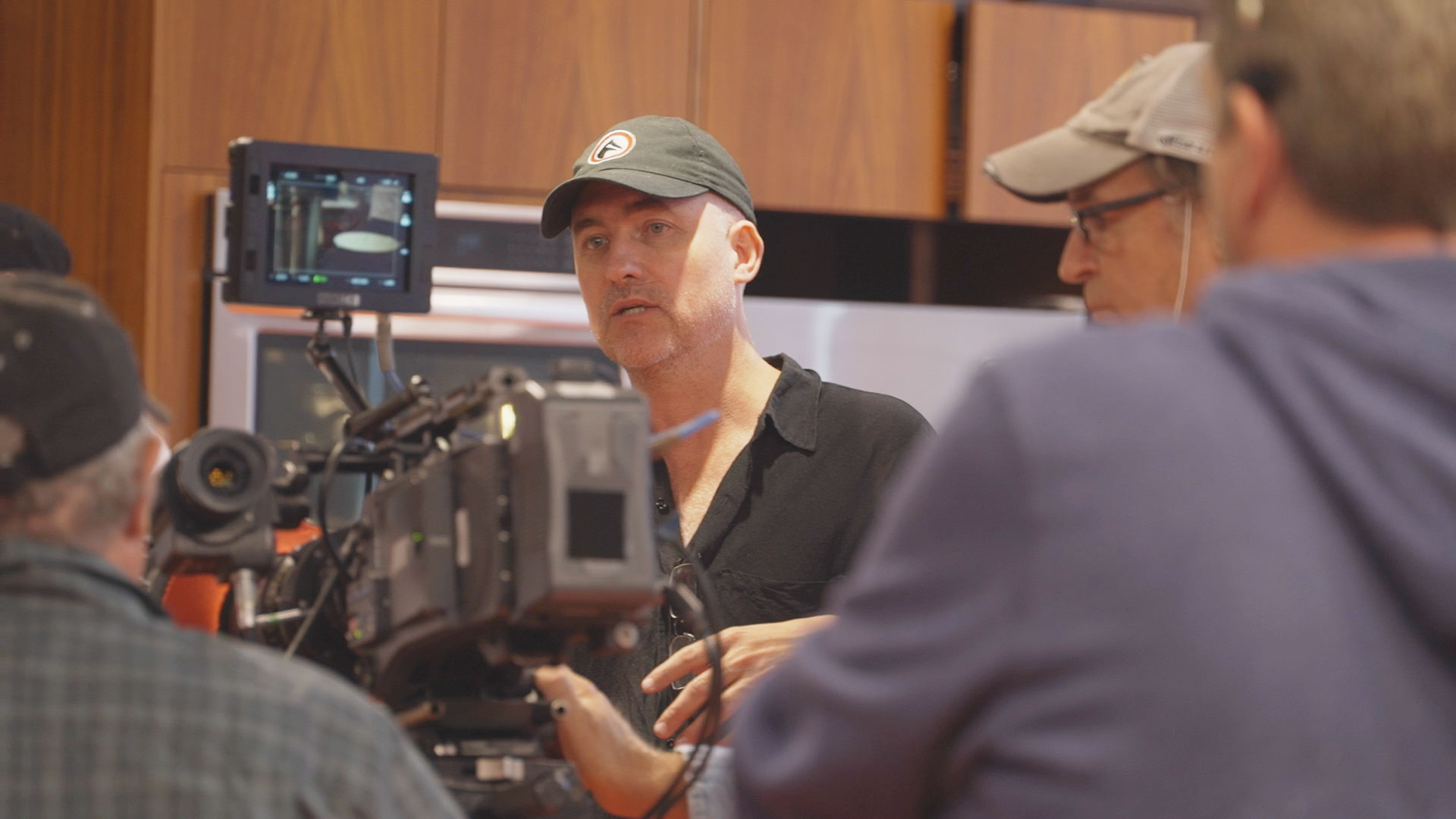

Andrew Keen is a Canadian documentary filmmaker who has received several accolades including two Juno Awards for his music documentaries.

Andy started out as a director of music videos and commercials before he directed his first documentary Seven Painters, Seven Places (1998) which was nominated for a Gemini Award, now the Canadian Screen Awards.

He collaborated with singer/songwriter Sarah Harmer to produce the documentary "Escarpment Blues" (2005), and with The Tragically Hip to produce "Bobcaygeon"(2012). The film had its World Premiere at the 2012 Vancouver International Film Festival (VIFF). Both films won Juno Awards for best music DVD of the year. He was a director of photography on "Know Your Mushrooms" (2009), directed by Ron Mann, and produced and edited "Shooting War, Shall We Close Our Eyes" with The Globe and Mail.

== Biography ==
Keen was born in Galt, Ontario. Raised in Oakville, Ontario. Studied at Bishop's University in Lennoxville, Quebec, and Ryerson University (now Toronto Metropolitan University) in Toronto, before completing a Bachelor of Fine Arts (Art History) at Concordia University in Montreal. After graduating, Keen moved to Toronto, where he began work in film and television as a production assistant.

== Filmography ==
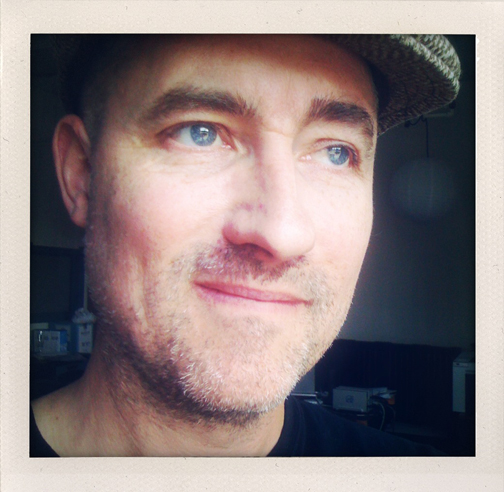

- Shooting War, Shall We Close Our Eyes, (2022) (producer, editor)
- The Tragically Hip in Bobcaygeon, 2012 (producer, director)
- Know Your Mushrooms, 2008 (director of photography)
- Escarpment Blues, 2006 (producer, director, editor, camera)
- Seven Painters Seven Places, 1999 (director, editor, camera)

== Awards ==
- 2000 Best Picture Editing in a documentary Gemini Award Nominee Seven Painters Seven Places (1999)
- 2006 Music DVD of The year Juno Awards Escarpment Blues 2006
- 2010 Winner People's Voice Award 2010 Webby Awards Best Website (Activism) www.stemcellcharter.org
- 2011 Award of Merit Advertising and Design Awards "Manifest Moves Issues" 2010
- 2013 Music DVD of The Year 2013 Juno Awards "Bobcaygeon" 2012
