= Al Purdy Was Here =

- Directed by: Brian D. Johnson
- Written by: Brian D. Johnson; Marni Jackson
- Produced by: Brian D. Johnson; Ron Mann; Jake Yanowski
- Cinematography: Nicholas de Pencier
- Edited by: Nick Taylor
- Production companies: Purdy Pictures; Rogers Documentary Fund
- Distributed by: Documentary; Films We Like
- Release date: September 15, 2015 (TIFF)
- Running time: 90 minutes
- Country: Canada
- Language: English

Al Purdy Was Here is a 2015 Canadian documentary film. Directed by Brian D. Johnson, the film is about the A-Frame Campaign, a literary and artistic project to raise funds for the restoration of influential Canadian poet Al Purdy's cabin in Prince Edward County as a writers’ and artists’ retreat. It also touches upon Purdy's quest to become a great Canadian poet, and the artists wrapped up in his legacy.

In addition to archival footage of Purdy, the film also features writers Leonard Cohen, Margaret Atwood, Michael Ondaatje, George Bowering and Joseph Boyden, actor Gordon Pinsent, and musicians Gordon Downie, Bruce Cockburn, Jesse Zubot, Sarah Harmer, Tanya Tagaq and Doug Paisley.

The film debuted at the 2015 Toronto International Film Festival, where it was named second runner-up for the People's Choice Award for Documentaries.

== The Al Purdy Songbook ==
An album of songs and poems inspired by Purdy, titled The Al Purdy Songbook, was also prepared as a companion piece to the film, and was released in 2018 to mark the 100th anniversary of Purdy's birth.

=== Track listing ===
1. "3 Al Purdys" — Bruce Cockburn (6:05)
2. "Transient" — Doug Paisley (4:14)
3. "Just Get Here" — Sarah Harmer (4:28)
4. "The East Wind" — Gord Downie (4:28)
5. "Sensitive Man" — Jason Collett (5:32)
6. "Outdoor Hotel" — Snowblink (3:43)
7. "Unprovable" — Greg Keelor (4:26)
8. "Wilderness Gothic" — Margaret Atwood (3:00)
9. "At the Quinte Hotel" — Gord Downie (3:08)
10. "Say the Names" — Bidiniband & the Billie Hollies (4:19)
11. "The Country North of Belleville" — Felicity Williams (4:54)
12. "Necropsy of Love" — Leonard Cohen (1:22)
13. "Cowboy" — Casey Johnson (3:08)
