= You Were Here =

Studio album by Sarah Harmer
- Released: August 29, 2000
- Recorded: 1999–2000, Toronto, Canada
- Genre: Alternative rock
- Length: 46:30
- Label: Cold Snap Records/Universal Music Canada
- Producer: Peter Prilesnik, Sarah Harmer

Sarah Harmer chronology
Songs for Clem (1999)	You Were Here (2000)	All of Our Names (2004)

You Were Here is an album by Canadian singer-songwriter Sarah Harmer, released in 2000.

== Background ==
You Were Here was Harmer's commercial breakthrough in Canada after years of almost reaching the pop charts with Weeping Tile. The album's lead single, "Basement Apt.", had previously been a Weeping Tile song, appearing on that band's 1995 release eepee. The album's second single, "Don't Get Your Back Up", had previously been recorded by Harmer with The Saddletramps. Three other songs, "Weakened State", "Lodestar" and "Coffee Stain", had also been previously recorded by Weeping Tile, on 1998's This Great Black Night.

Harmer stated "I always had kind of high expectations for You Were Here, but I was holding onto it for as long as I could, to find a proper, appropriate home." She self-financed and self-released the album on her own Cold Snap Records label before it was licensed by Zoë Records and Universal Music Canada.

Harmer appeared in support of the album on the Late Show with David Letterman on October 2, 2001, in an appearance in which stage manager Biff Henderson jumped in to sing impromptu backing vocals. She had originally been scheduled to appear the previous week, but was bumped when Rudy Giuliani's first post-9/11 appearance ran overtime.

The album's title track is a tribute to her former Weeping Tile bandmate Joe Chithalen, who died in 1999.

The Art of Time Ensemble featuring Sarah Slean recorded a Roberto Occhipinti arrangement of "Lodestar" on their 2009 album Black Flowers.

== Reception ==
Professional ratings
Review scores
Source	Rating
Allmusic	4/5 stars
Rolling Stone	3.5/5 stars
Q	3/5 stars

The album was warmly received. TIME ranked You Were Here in its year-end Top Ten list, calling it the year's best debut album.

You Were Here was named the 24th greatest Canadian album of all time in Bob Mersereau's 2007 book The Top 100 Canadian Albums.

Music critic Lisa M. Smith, writing for Allmusic, praised the album, and wrote of Harmer that "it is certain that she is an artist choosing wisely from a great scope of colors. With a pleasing and misleading start, the rollicking opening track asserts its individuality with a Vaudevillian clarinet, keeping one foot in Kinks pop and one in some elusive species of country rock." She describes the album as one of a pleasing ebb and flow. "Songs may begin with a soft acoustic, then unfold assuredly toward their climax. Various instruments add character now and then, such as a muted trumpet or a harmonica, and the energy level can sway between a lullaby and full pop treatment with a definite destination… the album as a whole feels sincere, answering to a variety of moods and whims. It is a work of quality, from the songwriting clear to the production." Rolling Stone gave the album 3.5 of 5 stars, stating it contained "Plainly hooky, tender-but-tough songs...Harmer lovingly chronicles the rough-and-tumble of real-life romance....a marvelously compelling meditation"

Q gave You Were Here 3 of 5 stars and called it "Lounge jazz, drum loops and lead guitar chops support a vocalist whose lyrical panache...marks her out from the crowd."

In an interview with No Depression, Paul Cantin called it "a welcome break from the Lilith school of flinchy girl singers. Her music is at once heartfelt and hardy, sensitive and sanguine."

== Track listing ==
All songs written by Sarah Harmer, except where noted.

1. "Around This Corner" – 3:15
2. "Basement Apt." – 4:08
3. "The Hideout" – 4:01
4. "Capsized" – 3:57
5. "Lodestar" – 5:28
6. "Weakened State" – 2:53
7. "Don't Get Your Back Up" – 3:54
8. "Open Window (The Wedding Song)" – 4:09
9. "Uniform Grey" – 3:43
10. "Coffee Stain" – 2:56
11. "You Were Here" – 4:53
12. "Everytime" (Dave Hodge) – 3:12

== Personnel ==
- Sarah Harmer – vocals, guitar, organ, harmonica, tambourine, Wurlitzer
- Gord Tough – guitar
- Benji Perosin – trumpet
- Gavin Brown – drums
- Peter Prilesnik – bass, beats, electric guitar, dobro, guitar
- Cam Giroux – drums
- Al Cross – drums
- Jason Euringer – background vocals
- Spencer Evans – clarinet
- Maury LaFoy – bass, upright bass
- Kevin Fox – cello
- Damon Richardson – drums
- Jenny Whiteley – background vocals
- Luther Wright – guitar

== Production ==
- Produced by Peter Prilesnik and Sarah Harmer
- Mixed by Eric Ratz
- Engineered by Pete Prilesnik
- Mastered by Brett Zilahi
- Editing by Blair Robb, Steve Webster and Brett Zilahi
- Cover photo by Yael Staav
- Photography by Luther Wright
- Design by Greg Hall

== Year-end charts ==
Year-end chart performance for You Were Here
Chart (2001)	Peak position
Canadian Albums (Nielsen SoundScan)	134

Chart (2002)	Position
Canadian Alternative Albums (Nielsen SoundScan)	110
