= A Northern Chorus =

Canadian band

- Origin: Hamilton, Ontario, Canada
- Genres: Space rock Folk music Post-rock
- Years active: 1999–2008
- Label: Sonic Unyon
- Members: Stu Livingstone; Pete Hall; Alex McMaster; Owen Davies; Craig Halliday; Erin Aurich
- Past members: Dan Jagt; Julie (MacDonald) Fader; Sarah MacGregor; Mark Raymond; Marshall Bureau; Steve Hesselink
- Website: www.sonicunyon.com/anorthernchorus www.myspace.com/anorthernchorus

A Northern Chorus was a Canadian band from Hamilton, Ontario. They released four records on the Sonic Unyon label.

== History ==
The band was formed in 1999 by singers/guitarists Stu Livingstone and Pete Hall after their previous group, Datura Dream Deferred, disbanded. The band's initial lineup also included bassist Mark Raymond, drummer Dan Jagt, violinist Erin Aurich, and flautist/guitarist Julie MacDonald, who also sang backup vocals.

In 2001, the band's first album, Before We All Go To Pieces, was originally released by Black Mountain Music. Later, it was re-released on Sonic Unyon with a slightly different track list. Prior to recording the next album, Spirit Flags, Jagt and Raymond left the band and were replaced by bassist Owen Davies and drummer Marshall Bureau, while violinist Sarah MacGregor replaced Aurich. In 2003, the band released its second album, Spirit Flags. In 2004, MacDonald left the band to join Sarah Harmer's band, and cellist/vocalist Alex McMaster joined soon after. In 2005, after releasing the third album, Bitter Hands Resign, drummer Marshall Bureau left and was replaced by Steve Hasselink.

Erin Aurich rejoined the band in time to be included on their fourth album, The Millions Too Many. This album also included drummer Craig Halliday and horn player Ben Bowen.

Between 2001 and 2008, the band toured Canada and the United States several times. They also toured the United Kingdom in 2004.

In May 2008, A Northern Chorus announced it would be disbanding. They played two final shows on June 27 (Horseshoe Tavern, Toronto) and June 28 (Hamilton), 2008.

In August 2011, the band reunited its Millions Too Many lineup to play two shows in Toronto and Hamilton, Ontario. In June 2014, they reunited once again to play a show in Hamilton.

== Members ==
- Stu Livingstone (guitars, vocals)
- Pete Hall (guitars, vocals)
- Alex McMaster (cello, vocals)
- Owen Davies (bass)
- Craig Halliday (percussion)
- Erin Aurich (violin)
- Graham Walsh (piano, organs and producer on Bitter Hands Resign and The Millions Too Many)
- Ben Bowen (horns on The Millions Too Many)

== Discography ==
=== Albums ===
- Before We All Go to Pieces (2001)
- Spirit Flags (May 20, 2003)
- Bitter Hands Resign (May 3, 2005)
- The Millions Too Many (March 20, 2007)
