= Great Lake Swimmers =

Canadian folk rock band

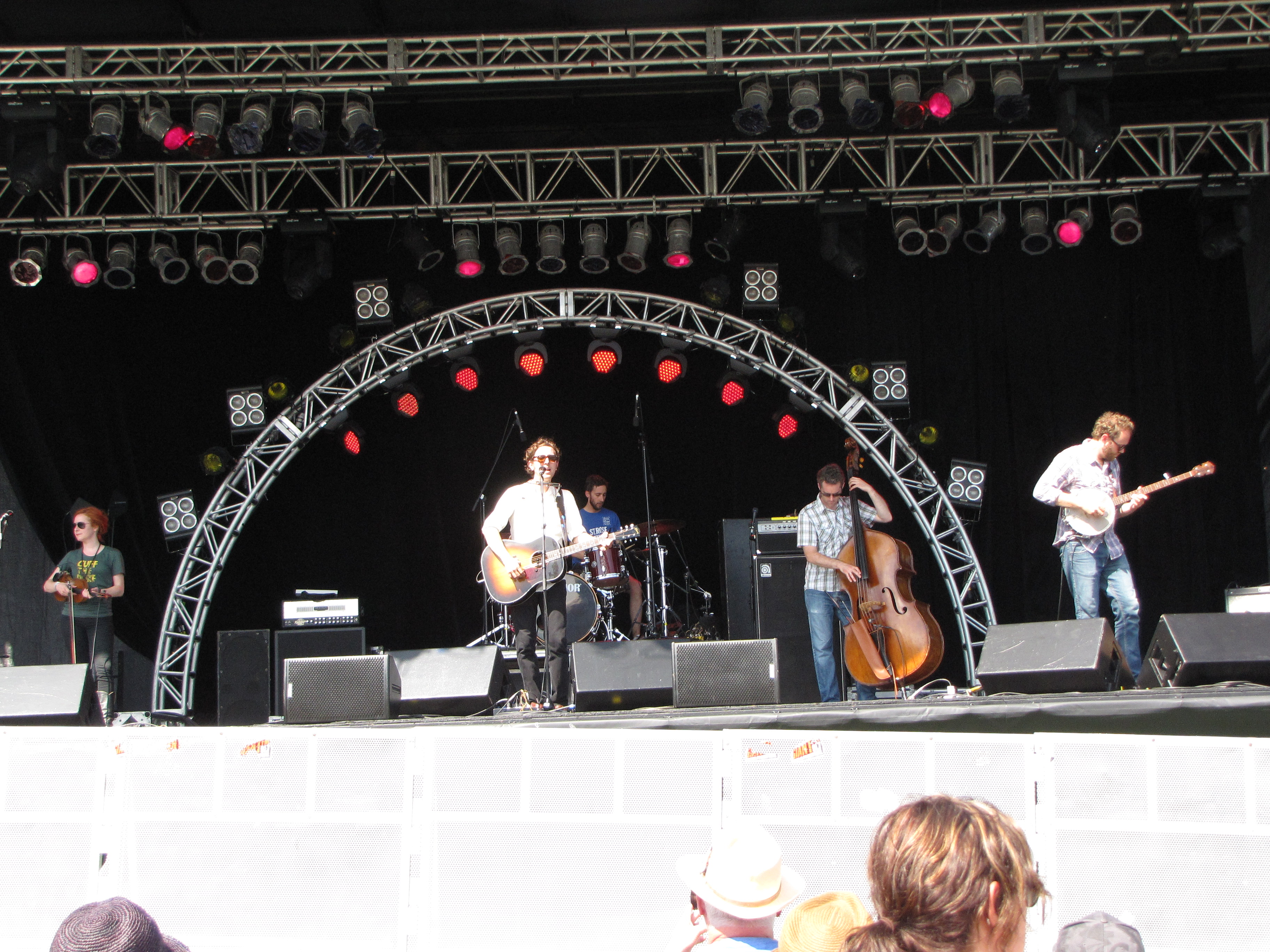
- Performing at the Burlington Sound of Music festival

Background information
- Origin: Wainfleet; Toronto, Ontario, Canada
- Genres: Folk rock, Indie
- Years active: 2003–present
- Labels: Weewerk, Nettwerk
- Members: Tony Dekker; Erik Arnesen; Kelsey McNulty; Bret Higgins; Ryan Granville-Martin
- Past members: Julie Fader; Colin Huebert; Mike Overton; Sandro Perri; Greg Millson; Miranda Mulholland; Bret Higgins; Joshua Van Tassel; Darcy Yates
- Website: greatlakeswimmers.com

Great Lake Swimmers is a Canadian folk rock band from Wainfleet, Ontario, and currently based in Toronto.

The current touring line-up is Tony Dekker on lead vocals, acoustic guitar and harmonica, Erik Arnesen on banjo, electric guitar and harmonium, Ryan Granville-Martin on drums and backing vocals, Bret Higgins on upright bass and Kelsey McNulty on keyboards and backing vocals. Past members included Julie Fader on backing vocals, Sandro Perri on guitar, and Greg Millson and Colin Huebert on drums.

The band's style has been compared to Red House Painters, Nick Drake, Iron & Wine and Neil Young, as well as Will Oldham (Bonnie "Prince" Billy) and Sufjan Stevens. Dekker has cited influences including Gordon Lightfoot, Gram Parsons and Hank Williams.

== History ==
The band released two albums, Great Lake Swimmers in 2003 and Bodies and Minds in 2005, on the independent label (weewerk) before signing to the larger Nettwerk in 2007.

The band released its third full-length album, Ongiara, on March 27, 2007, in Canada and in May for the rest of the world. Although signing to Nettwerk early in 2007, Great Lake Swimmers continue to be managed by (weewerk). In September 2007, (weewerk) released a limited edition vinyl version of Ongiara. It was available in Australia through native indie label Speak N Spell.

Their fourth album, Lost Channels, was released on March 31, 2009. It was shortlisted for the 2009 Polaris Music Prize, and was nominated for a Juno Award, in the category of Roots & Traditional Album of the Year – Group, and a Canadian Folk Music Award.

In 2009, Great Lake Swimmers took part in an interactive documentary series called City Sonic. The series, which featured 20 Toronto artists, had Tony Dekker talk about his daily underground commute along Toronto’s subway system. In 2011, Dekker participated in the documentary series National Parks Project, visiting Cape Breton Highlands National Park in Nova Scotia with filmmaker Keith Behrman and musicians Daniela Gesundheit and Old Man Luedecke.

The band's fifth studio album, New Wild Everywhere, was released on April 3, 2012. The band also composed an instrumental soundtrack for photographer Ian Coristine's One in a Thousand, an e-book of photography from the Thousand Islands region of Ontario, also released in April 2012.

Dekker released a solo album, Prayer of the Woods, in October 2013. The album includes eight original songs as well as covers of Gordon Lightfoot's "Carefree Highway" and Human Sexual Response's "Land of the Glass Pinecones". In 2014, he followed up with Sings 10 Years of Zunior, an album of covers of other Canadian artists — including Old Man Luedecke, Chad VanGaalen, Christine Fellows, Ohbijou, Rae Spoon, Matt Mays, Martin Tielli, Jennifer Castle and Cadence Weapon — released to mark the 10th anniversary of Canadian web music store Zunior.

The sixth studio album by the full band, A Forest of Arms, was released on April 21, 2015. In 2017, they followed up with the Christmas-themed EP They Don't Make Them Like That Anymore.

In February 2018, the band released the single "Falling Apart"/"The Talking Wind", as an advance preview of the forthcoming album The Waves, the Wake.

Their eighth album, Uncertain Country, was released on April 28, 2023. In 2024, they appeared on several tracks from Abigail Lapell's album Anniversary. The 5th track on the album, "Swimming Like Flying", was written in memory of Bonnie O'Donnell, a passionate swimmer and close friend of Tony Dekker and Serena Ryder. O'Donnell managed Ryder from 2004 until her sudden death in January 2008 at age 32. Ryder sang the guest vocals on the track.

Their ninth album, Caught Light, was released in October 2025.

== Discography ==
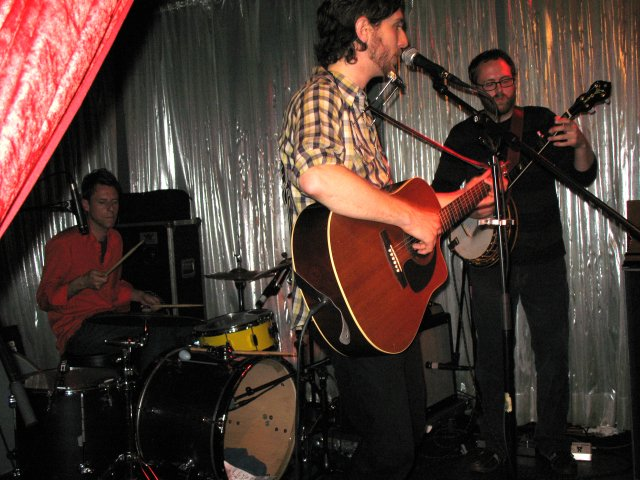
Playing at the Tsunami Club in Köln.

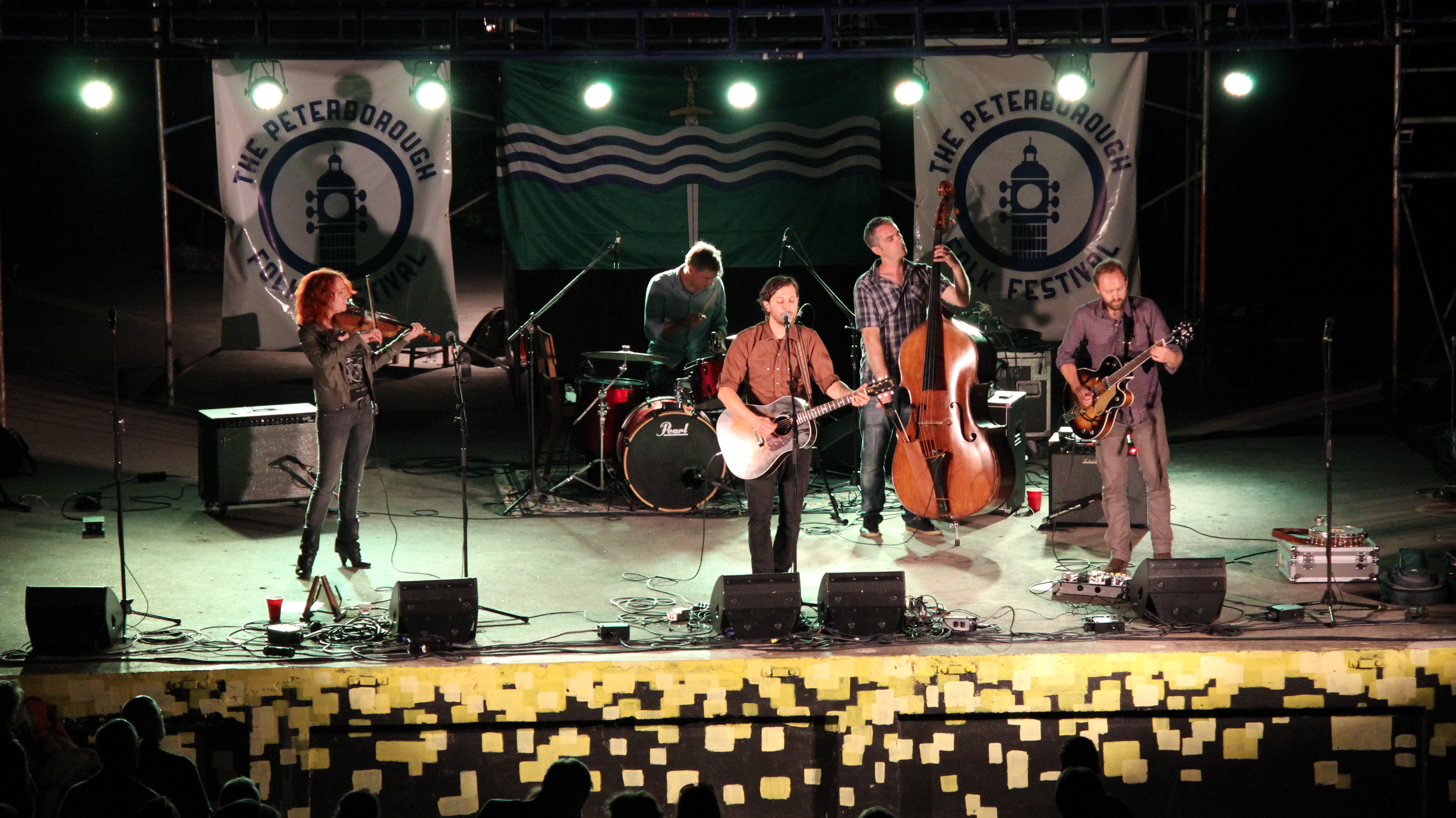
Great Lake Swimmers on stage at the Peterborough Folk Festival in 2014

=== Studio albums ===
- Great Lake Swimmers (weewerk, 2003)
- Bodies and Minds (weewerk, 2005)
- Ongiara (Nettwerk, 2007)
- Lost Channels (Nettwerk, 2009)
- New Wild Everywhere (Nettwerk, 2012)
- A Forest of Arms (Nettwerk, 2015)
- The Waves, the Wake (Nettwerk, 2018)
- Uncertain Country (2023)
- Caught Light (2025)

=== Acoustic albums ===
- The Waves, the Wake (Acoustic) (Nettwerk, 2019)
- In Pieces: An Acoustic Retrospective (2024)

=== Cover albums ===
- When Last We Shook Hands: Cover Songs, Vol. 1 (2020)

=== EPs ===
- Hands in Dirty Ground (weewerk, 2006)
- Swimming Away (2016)
- They Don't Make Them Like That Anymore (2017)
- Side Effects (2018)

=== Live albums ===
- Live at the Church of the Redeemer (Nettwerk, 2007)
- The Legion Sessions (Nettwerk, 2009)
- Live in Ottawa at the 27 Club, October 3, 2019 (2020)
- Live at the Redeemer 2007 (Weewerk, 2021)

=== Singles ===
Year	Song	Chart peak	Album
Year	Song	CAN Alt	Album
2005	"To Leave It Behind"	×	Bodies and Minds
2005	"Bodies and Minds"	×	Bodies and Minds
2007	"Your Rocky Spine"	×	Ongiara
2007	"Backstage with the Modern Dancers"	×	Ongiara
2009	"Pulling on a Line"	×	Lost Channels
2012	"Easy Come Easy Go"	28	New Wild Everywhere
2012	"The Great Exhale"	×	New Wild Everywhere
"—" denotes a release that did not chart. "×" denotes periods where charts did not exist or were not archived.

=== Compilations ===
- See You on the Moon! (2005): "See You on the Moon!"
- The Sound the Hare Heard (2006): "Where in the World Are You"
- Borrowed Tunes II: A Tribute to Neil Young (2007): "Don't Cry No Tears"
- Peace on Earth (2007): "Gonna Make It Thru This Year"
- Northern Songs: Canada's Best and Brightest (2008): "Your Rocky Spine"
- (weewerk) is 6! (2008): "Song for the Angels (Miracle Version)", "Gonna Make It Thru This Year". (Dekker also appears as a guest musician on tracks by Audiotransparent, Julie Fader and United Steel Workers of Montreal.)
- Friends in Bellwoods II (2009): "Send Me a Letter"
- Introducing Townes Van Zandt via the Great Unknown (2009): "Our Mother the Mountain"
- A Country Blues Christmas: The 2010 Zunior Holiday Album (2010): "When the Snow Starts to Fall"
- Paint it Black: An Alt-Country Tribute to the Rolling Stones (2011): "Before They Make Me Run"
- Have Not Been the Same - Vol. 1: Too Cool to Live, Too Smart to Die (2011): "What Was Going Through My Head" (The Grapes of Wrath cover)
- My Name Is Mathias (2014): "The Things That People Make (Part 3)"

=== Soundtrack ===
- This is not like home (Silver Road, 2007)
- Your Rocky Spine (Weeds, 3x06 Grasshopper, 2007)
- Passenger Song (Numb3rs, 5x08 Thirty-Six Hours, 2008)
- Song Sung Blue (original film score, weewerk, 2008)
- There Is a Light (The Light of Family Burnam, 2008)
- I Could Be Nothing (Personal Effects), 2010)
- Leave It Behind (Personal Effects), 2010)
- Imaginary Bars (Out of Place: a Portrait of Surfing in Cleveland, Ohio, 2010)

=== Other ===
In 2006, the band released a "digital box set" on Zunior, consisting of their first two albums, the limited edition Hands in Dirty Ground EP, several digital tour photos and the video for their song "To Leave It Behind" on a 512 MB USB flash drive.

In 2008, Dekker appeared on Jenny Omnichord's album Charlotte or Otis: Duets for Children, Their Parents and Other People Too, performing a duet vocal on the song "Do You Know Karate".

In 2009, the band released a limited double 7" vinyl split single with the Dutch band Audiotransparent. This release includes a cover of the Elvis Presley classic "Don't Be Cruel" and the original song "Send Me a Letter". Dekker and Arnesen also appear on the Audiotransparent song "You Are a Movie".

In 2010, the band contributed four tracks to the online music community Swim Drink Fish Music, including live versions of their songs "Your Rocky Spine", "I Could Be Nothing" and "Everything Is Moving So Fast" and a previously unreleased track, "Ballad of a Fisherman's Wife".

The songs “I Became Awake” and “Various Stages” are heard in the 2010 independent Canadian horror film The Corridor.

The song "Moving Pictures Silent Films" was featured in the August 8, 2011 episode of Warehouse 13, entitled "3...2...1..."

In 2012, the band contributed the Christmas song "Hang a String of Lights" to Paste magazine's annual online Holiday Sampler music collection.

== Awards ==
Year	Nominee / work	Award	Result
2009	Lost Channels	Juno Awards of 2009 - the Roots & Traditional Album of the Year	Nominated
2009	Lost Channels	Polaris Short List	Nominated
2010	Great Lake Swimmers	CMW Indie Awards - Favourite Folk/Roots Artist/Group	Won
2013	New Wild Everywhere	Juno Awards of 2013 - Roots & Traditional Album of the Year	Nominated
