= Ekaterina Shchelkanova =

Russian singer, actress and dancer (born 1970)

Ekaterina Nikolaevna Shchelkanova
- Born: May 2, 1970 (age 56); Leningrad, Russian SFSR, Soviet Union
- Other name: Ekaterina Chtchelkanova
- Occupations: Ballerina, singer, actress
- Years active: 1991–present

Ekaterina Nikolaievna Shchelkanova (Russian: Екатерина Николаевна Щелканова, also spelled Chtchelkanova; born May 2, 1970) is a Russian ballerina, singer and actress from Leningrad, RSFSR, USSR (now St. Petersburg, Russia). To American audiences, she is best known as Hunyak, the Hungarian death row prisoner, from the musical Chicago (2002). Chtchelkanova was also cast as Darya in the Canadian film The End of Silence, and held parts in the films Odin's Shield Maiden, and Center Stage.

Shchelkanova is a graduate from the Vaganova Academy, where she studied under Ludmila Safronova, then joined the Kirov Ballet. During a tour to the US in 1992, she defected. From 1995-2001, she was a member of the American Ballet Theatre. She has appeared with Les Grands Ballets Canadiens de Montréal in 2008, and with the Space Coast Ballet in 2005. In 2010, she founded the Open World Dance Foundation.
