= Men with Brooms =

- Promotional poster
- Directed by: Paul Gross
- Written by: Paul Gross; John Krizanc; Paul Quarrington
- Produced by: Robert Lantos
- Starring: Paul Gross; Connor Price; Leslie Nielsen; Peter Outerbridge; Kari Matchett; Molly Parker; Polly Shannon
- Cinematography: Thom Best
- Edited by: Susan Maggi
- Distributed by: Alliance Atlantis Releasing
- Release date: March 8, 2002
- Running time: 102 minutes
- Country: Canada
- Language: English
- Budget: $7.5 million
- Box office: $4.2 million

Men with Brooms is a 2002 Canadian romantic comedy film, starring and directed by Paul Gross. Centred on the sport of curling, the offbeat comedy tells the story of a reunited curling team from a small Canadian town as they work through their respective life issues and struggle to win the championship for the sake of their late coach.

The cast also includes Connor Price, Leslie Nielsen, Peter Outerbridge, Kari Matchett, Molly Parker and Polly Shannon. Members of the Canadian rock band The Tragically Hip make a cameo appearance in the film as a competing rink representing Kingston, Ontario, the band's home city. Winnipeg curler and three-time Brier champion Jeff Stoughton also made a cameo appearance throwing his trademark "spin-o-rama" shot.

A television adaptation, also titled Men with Brooms debuted October 4, 2010 on CBC Television for the 2010-11 television season.

== Plot ==
The movie begins with Donald Foley retrieving curling stones from a lake near Long Bay, Ontario. Foley dies after retrieving the stones, and a codicil to his will demands that the curling rink he formerly coached be re-assembled, and enter a bonspiel to win the Golden Broom by placing a stone containing his ashes on the button.

The team's skip, Chris Cutter, had skipped town ten years ago over the shame of failing to call a burnt stone, abandoning his fiancée Julie Foley (Donald's daughter) at the altar, and throwing the team's stones into the lake. Chris returns to Long Bay, where he convinces the former members of his team, Neil Bucyk, James Lennox, and Eddie Strombeck, to enter the competition for the Golden Broom.

While the rink practices for the Golden Broom tournament, Chris tries to make amends with Julie, which is complicated by his feelings for her younger sister Amy. Neil deals with his resentment towards his wife, and unhappiness at running a funeral home inherited from his father-in-law. Eddie deals with his low sperm count and dissatisfaction about being unable to father children. James is working as a minor drug dealer, and tries to raise money to pay off a supplier to whom he is indebted.

After losing a match to an extremely elderly rink, the team realises they need a coach to be prepared for the bonspiel. Chris reconciles with his estranged father Gordon Cutter, so he will coach them. Gordon trains the team for the upcoming bonspiel.

In the first match of the bonspiel, the rink plays another one, skipped by former Olympian Alexander Yount. Chris again fails to call a burnt stone, demoralising himself, the rest of his rink, and his father. Chris goes drinking at a bar, where Amy meets him and informs him she and Julie have come to an understanding; Julie accepts that he and Amy love one another, and once Chris accepts it they can be together. Julie, an astronaut will meanwhile be blasted off into space. Chris goes to his mother's grave where he encounters his father; they reconcile, and Gordon tells him to go be with Amy.

Neil quits the rink, and is replaced by Gordon. However, in the second to last match, Gordon once again throws out his back and is unable to curl. However, Chris and his rink manage to win the match.

In the final match of the bonspiel, the rink once again meets Yount's. With Gordon injured, Chris is forced to curl with a rink of three. Down 6-0 early, Gordon laments that they "need a good lead man." At this time, Neil and his wife are at the country club. Joanne rushes to the club and convinces Neil to rejoin the rink. Chris and his rink stage a comeback, and are now within victory.

On the critical final shot, one of the sweepers burns the stone, noticed only by Chris. In this instance, Chris calls the burn. Yount allows Chris to retake the shot, to which Chris changes up his shot. Chris throws his father's rock directly at the centre of the house with great force, smashing it and the rock it collided with. A large piece of granite lands directly on the button, along with Coach Foley's ashes. Chris and his rink have not only won the Golden Broom bonspiel, but have also fulfilled Coach Finley's final wish.

In the end the team resolves their issues: Chris finally connects with Amy, Neil and Joanne talk about his dream to own a plant nursery and not run the funeral home, Eddie finally impregnates his wife and James finally is forgiven his debt to his drug supplier, as the collector is from a long line of curlers.

== Cast ==
- Paul Gross as Chris Cutter
- Peter Outerbridge as James Lennox
- Jed Rees as Eddie Strombeck
- James Allodi as Neil Bucyk
- James B. Douglas as Donald Foley
- Leslie Nielsen as Gordon Cutter
- Barbara Gordon as Eva Foley
- Molly Parker as Amy Foley
- Connor Price as Brandon Foley
- Michelle Nolden as Julie Foley
- Michael Yebba as Police Officer Foley
- Polly Shannon as Joanne
- Jane Spidell as Lilly Strombeck
- Kari Matchett as Linda Bucyk
- Bob Bainborough as Greg Guinness
- A. Paul Savage as Paul Savage
- George Karrys as Barnhart
- Greg Bryk as Alexander "The Juggernaut" Yount
- Stan Coles as Minister
- Darryl Casselman as Ronnie
- Mike "Nug" Nahrgang as Nug McTeague
- Timm Zemanek as Marvin Fleiger
- George Buza as Stuckmore

== Production ==
=== Origins ===
The film began from a discussion that Gross had with producer Robert Lantos right after Due South was cancelled. Lantos had an idea for a hockey film: "I talked to (co-writer) John Krizanc about it, but it was too complicated with that number of characters. Besides, hockey is political. It's hard to talk hockey in this country since we think of it as our game, but it's largely owned by others." Gross solved those problems by replacing hockey with curling.

In October 2000, Gross was still working on the script with Krizanc and another writer, Paul Quarrington.

=== Pre-production and filming ===
According to Thom Best (the film's director of photography), the film had three weeks of pre-production, which mostly consisted of scouting locations in Ontario. Six weeks of principal photography took place in Toronto, in locations such as a studio space and the streets in Uxbridge. Four days of exteriors were shot around the mines in Sudbury, and two more weeks of principal photography occurred in Hamilton and Brampton curling rinks.

Alliance Atlantis invested $1.5 million or more in the film's print and advertising campaign, which included an eight-city, private jet tour for cast, the director, and producer Robert Lantos.

== Reception ==
The film attracted $1.04 million in North American box office, opening on 215 screens in 207 theatres for a $5,024 per-screen average, the third highest among all North American releases for the three-day opening period starting March 8. It ended up grossing over $4.2 million in Canada – making it the top-grossing English Canadian film subsidized by Telefilm Canada between 1997 and 2002. Released on 27 screens in the United States, it grossed $14 765.

American magazine Entertainment Weekly gave the film a grade of C-, calling the film's cast "charming" but criticized the script for being "alternately overdetermined and touching, crass and sharply comic." Reviewers for Jam! were split. One called it a "perplexing example of promise unfulfilled, despite many charming moments...[whose] romantic elements are light, like watery beer with the alcoholic kick removed. And the comedy elements are often too crude and clumsy to do justice to the movie's situations." Another called it a "winning ensemble comedy that shows Canadians can put gentle laughs and equally gentle sentiments on the button, just as easily as their counterparts anywhere else in the world." Hollywood trade paper Variety called it a "wan romantic comedy" with "ineffective physical comedy in slightly crude Brit geezer vein...[and] a load of unneeded expletives."

The film now has a cult following on DVD. Many relish the gentle Canadian comedy with its wry look at its country.

In September 2002, Lantos told Playback that he and Gross had a sequel in development.

The film won a Canadian Comedy Award for its "Pretty Funny Direction", and received two nominations at the 23rd Genie Awards, one for Molly Parker's performance and another for the screenplay.

== Soundtrack and book ==
A soundtrack album for the film was released, with songs by The Tragically Hip, Kathleen Edwards, The New Pornographers, and Our Lady Peace among others. A best-selling novelization by Diane Baker-Mason (ISBN 1-55278-263-8) was also published in 2002.

Not included on the soundtrack is the opening theme, an arrangement by Jack Lenz of the Canadian folksong Land of the Silver Birch performed by Paul Gross, Jack Lenz and D Cameron. The song's lyrics and relevance remain the focus of debate for many fans.
