= Brasse-Camarade =

Canadian francophone rock group

- Origin: Ontario, Canada
- Genres: Rock
- Years active: 1991–1999
- Members: François Lamoureux; Pierre Lamoureux

Brasse-Camarade was a Canadian francophone rock band from Ontario, Canada. The group's two core members, brothers François and Pierre Lamoureux, were born in Sudbury and later lived in Toronto, Ottawa, and Penetanguishene before moving to Montreal to study music at McGill University.

The band released its debut album in 1993 and went on to issue four additional albums before disbanding in 1999. Brasse-Camarade became known for creating and organizing a network of performance venues across Canadian schools, one of which eventually developed into Réseau Ontario. The group performed more than 500 concerts across North America, from Alabama and Louisiana to Yellowknife, and from Vancouver to Baie Sainte-Marie in Nova Scotia. They also toured in Portugal, the Azores, and France.

Although the band achieved several top ten hits, members have stated that they faced resistance from some radio stations in Quebec due to their Franco-Ontarian background. According to the band, certain program directors refused to play their music for that reason. Following this, Brasse-Camarade focused on their growing audience in Portugal, which ultimately led Pierre and François Lamoureux to opportunities in New York City and the eventual creation of FogoLabs Corp.

Despite building a large fan base through extensive touring, the band struggled to gain exposure on radio and television. Their disbandment coincided with the emergence of the internet, and they later reflected that social media could have helped them overcome the barriers they faced in Quebec radio.

After Brasse-Camarade disbanded, the Lamoureux brothers founded FogoLabs Corp. and Cinemusica, both of which specialize in producing concert films. Their credits include concert releases for Rush, Branford Marsalis, The Who, Cowboy Junkies, Brian Setzer, Pat Metheny, Joe Satriani, Peter Frampton, and Willie Nelson.

Their Zappa Plays Zappa concert film earned a Grammy Award for Best Instrumental Rock Performance. Pierre and François Lamoureux also received the Juno Award for Music DVD of the Year on two occasions—once with The Tragically Hip (That Night in Toronto) and once with Billy Talent (666). The brothers directed and produced Harry Connick Jr.'s Only You – The Concert and In Concert on Broadway, both of which won Emmy Awards for Outstanding Music Direction. Their other productions have received multiple industry honours, including two Gemini Awards with Cowboy Junkies, as well as recognition from the DVD Association, DVD Awards, and Surround Music Awards for their work with artists such as Rush, Branford Marsalis, Willie Nelson, the Stray Cats, and the Brian Setzer Orchestra.

In 2010, the brothers established Cinemusica as a production company dedicated to creative and performing arts projects. FogoLabs has since evolved into a full-service audiovisual production company with a broader focus beyond concert films. Its recent productions include broadcasts of the Fragrance Foundation FiFi Awards, the NEA Jazz Masters Awards, and other live events. FogoLabs currently produces the Front and Center and Speakeasy series on PBS, with Pierre and François serving as directors and François handling audio mixing. Featured artists have included Joe Satriani, Christina Perri, Alt-J, and Lady Antebellum.

As of recent reports, Brasse-Camarade is considering a reunion, and a box set is in development, though no release date has been announced.

== Members ==
- François Lamoureux - vocals, guitars
- Pierre Lamoureux - bass

=== Drummers ===
- Arnold Bondi (until 1993)
- Jim Pistilli (1993–1994)
- Tim Rideout (1994–1995)
- Francois Paré (1996)
- Shawn Sasyniuk (1997–1999)

Other drummers to have performed and or recorded with Brasse-Camarade include Jo Anne Blondin, Pierre Pineault, Claude Desjardins, Martin Gaboury, Marc-André Fortin, and Pascal Racine.

== Discography ==
- 1993: Brasse-Camarade
- 1994: Fonce!
- 1996: Princesse des Bayous
- 1996: "Mas Voltarei" (Portuguese, English and French album.)
- 1997: Les étrangers
- 1997: Mil Razoes (Portuguese album)
- 1998: Rêve et réalité (5-song EP)
- 1998: Mil Razoes/Mille raisons (Singles)
- 1998: Tard/Éternel/Éterno (Singles)
