= Gary Lincoff =

American mycologist and author

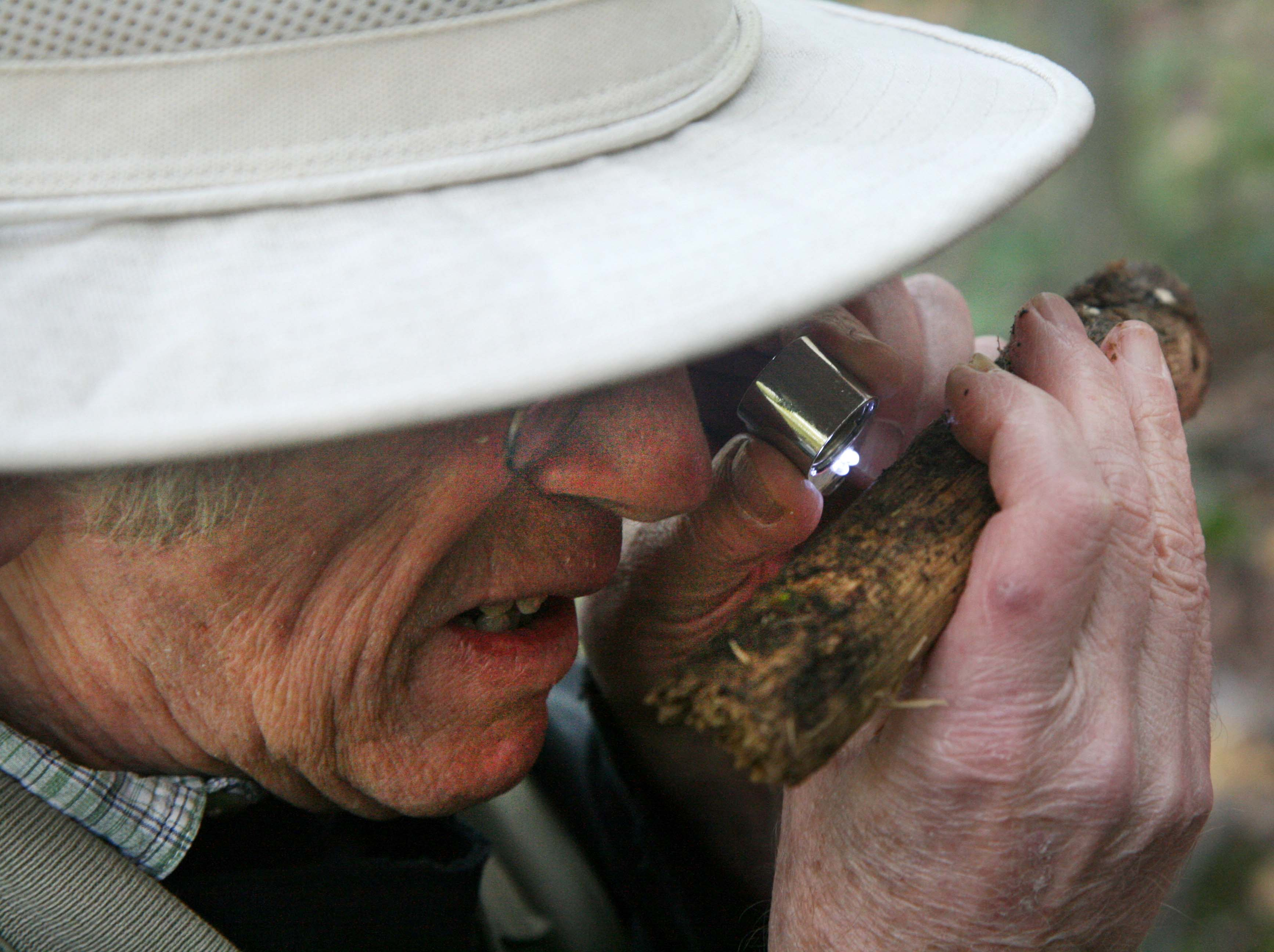
- Lincoff in 2012 identifying a fungus
- Died: March 16, 2018 (aged 75); Manhattan, New York
- Education: University of Pittsburgh
- Occupations: mycologist, author
- Spouse: Irene Liberman
- Children: 1
- Writing career
- Notable work: National Audubon Society Field Guide to North American Mushrooms
- Website: garylincoff.com

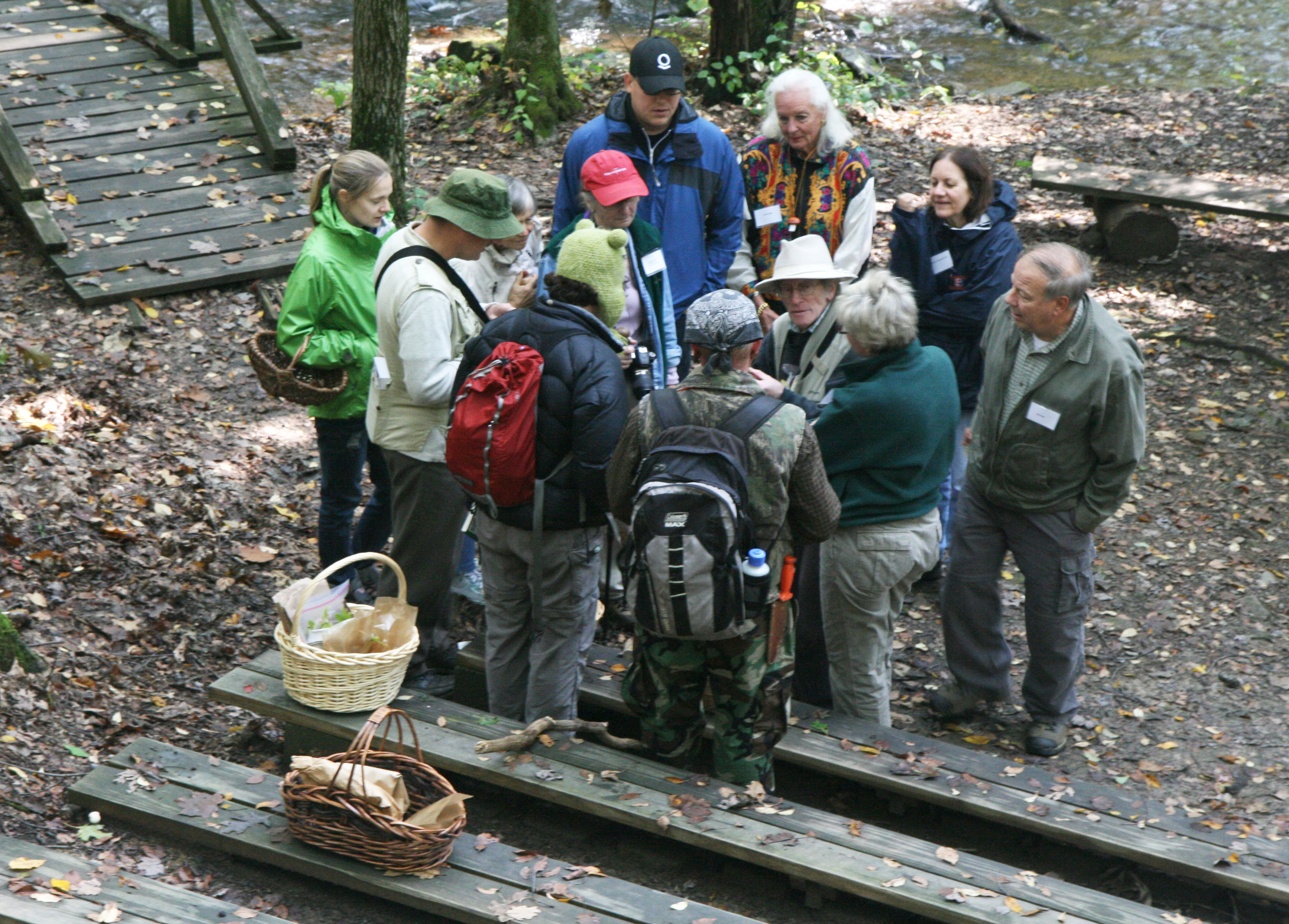
Mushroom foray in Pennsylvania with Gary Lincoff, 2012

Gary Lincoff (1942–2018) was an American mycologist and naturalist. Lincoff taught at the New York Botanical Garden for over 40 years and authored numerous books and field guides on mushrooms.

== Early life and education ==
Lincoff was born in Pittsburgh in 1942 to Bette Forman and Leonard Lincoff, an optometrist. He attended the University of Pittsburgh, and graduated with a BA degree in philosophy in 1963.

== Career ==
Lincoff began foraging for wild foods, including mushrooms, in the early 1970s. He began teaching at the New York Botanical Garden where he continued to teach for 40 years. In 1978, Lincoff published a book on toxic mushrooms; and was shortly thereafter recruited to write Field Guide to North American Mushrooms for the National Audubon Society. The book sold over 500,000 copies. He held the position of president of the North American Mycological Association for nine years.

In 1981, Lincoff co-founded, with Emanuel Salzman and Andrew Weil, Paul Stamets and others, the Telluride Mushroom Festival. Lincoff wrote scientific papers in peer-reviewed academic journals as well as in popular science publications, and was a regular contributor to FUNGI Magazine. Books that he authored or co-authored include Guide to Mushrooms (Simon and Schuster), The Complete Mushroom Hunter, The Mushroom Book (Eyewitness Guides), Toxic and Hallucinogenic Mushroom Poisoning: A Handbook For Physicians and Mushroom Hunters, among others.

== Personal life ==
Lincoff met Irene Liberman in 1967, whom he married. They had one son, Noah. Gary also had a brother, Bennett.

== Awards ==
In 2016, Lincoff received the MSA Award from the Mycological Society of America, and in 2017 received the Gordon and Tina Wasson Prize award from the Mycological Society of America.

== Legacy ==
The North American Mycological Association's Gary Lincoff Award for Contributions to Amateur Mycology is named for him.

== See also ==
- Giuliana Furci
- Paul Stamets
