= Men with Brooms (soundtrack) =

Soundtrack album by Various Artists
- Released: May 3, 2002
- Genre: Soundtracks
- Length: 54:27
- Label: Universal Music Canada

Men with Brooms is the soundtrack album to the Canadian film Men with Brooms, released in 2002.

== Track listing ==
1. Sarah Harmer with The Tragically Hip, "Silver Road" (2:48)
2. Kathleen Edwards, "Hockey Skates" (4:25)
3. The Tragically Hip, "Throwing Off Glass" (3:27)
4. Our Lady Peace, "Life" (4:22)
5. The New Pornographers, "Mass Romantic" (4:03)
6. Sean MacDonald, "God" (2:34)
7. Big Sugar, "Diggin' a Hole" (4:37)
8. Tom Wilson, "Planet Love" (2:52)
9. Matthew Good Band, "Hello Time Bomb" (3:55)
10. Pepper Sands, "Can U Tell" (3:13)
11. Chantal Kreviazuk, "Leading Me Home" (4:37)
12. Paul Gross, "Kiss ’Til You Weep" (3:40)
13. Holly McNarland, "Watching Over You" (3:44)
14. The Tragically Hip, "Oh Honey" (2:17)
15. Jack Lenz, "Men With Brooms Theme" (3:53)
