= Jason Euringer =

Canadian musician

Jason Euringer is a Canadian musician.

A guitarist/vocalist and bass player, he frequently appears on recordings by artists in the Kingston, Ontario scene, including Weeping Tile, Sarah Harmer and Luther Wright and the Wrongs. Harmer's 1999 album Songs for Clem included a cover credit for Euringer.

His harmonies and stand-up bass on tracks like "See her Wave" and "Little Frogs," along with his enduring connections with collaborators like Gord Tough, emphasize the lasting impact he has had on the musical journey.

He also appears in Harmer's 2006 documentary film Escarpment Blues.
