= Wainfleet, Ontario =

Wainfleet
- Township (lower-tier)
- Township of Wainfleet
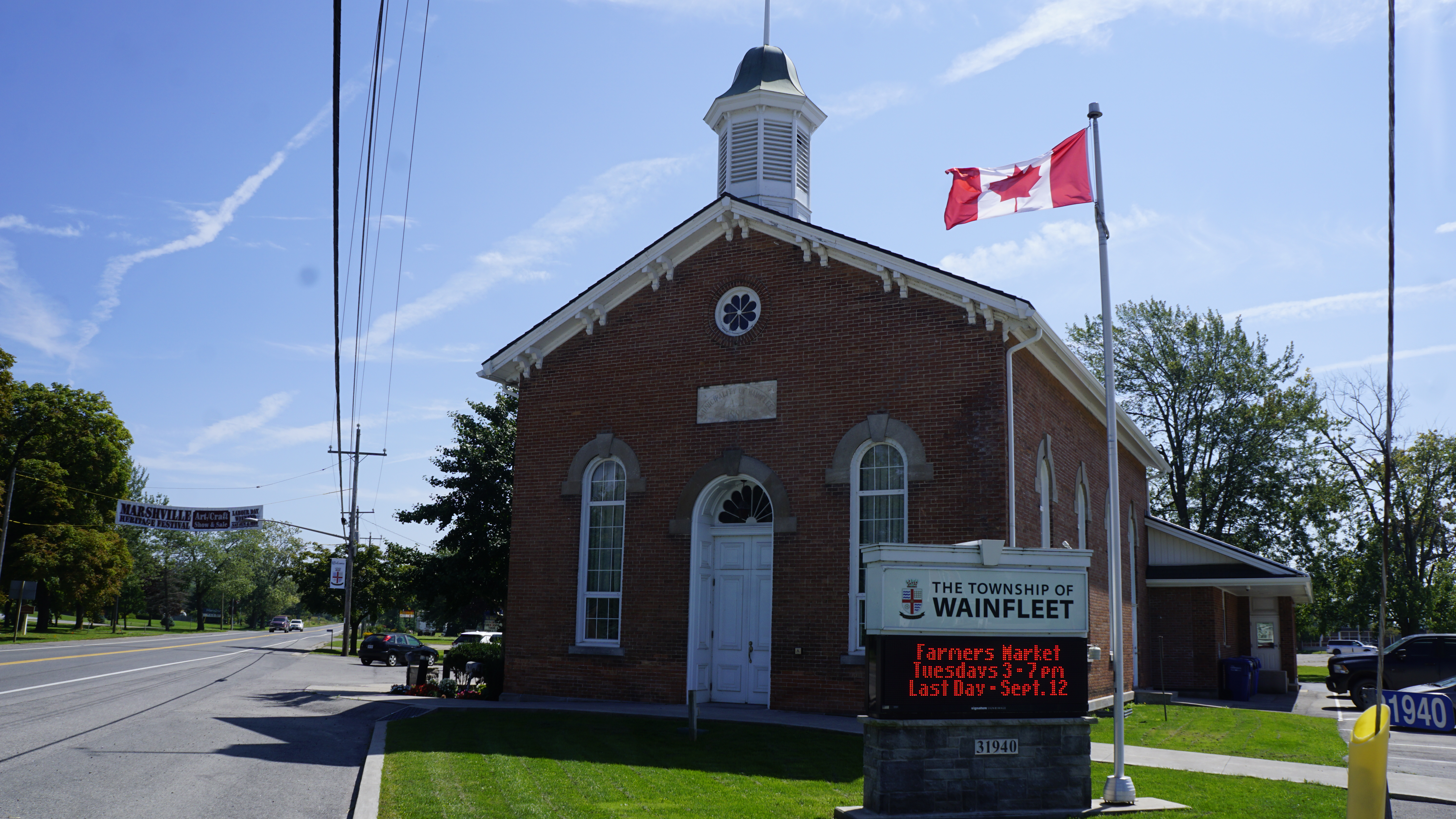
- Wainfleet Township Hall

- Location within Regional Municipality of Niagara Location within Southern Ontario
- Coordinates: 42°55′30″N 79°22′30″W
- Country: Canada
- Province: Ontario
- Region: Niagara
- Formed: 1970

Government
  - Mayor: Brian Grant
  - Federal riding: Niagara West
  - Prov. riding: Niagara West

Area
  - Land: 217.53 km^{2} (83.99 sq mi)
- Elevation: 177 m (581 ft)

Population
  - Total: 6,887
  - Density: 31.7/km^{2} (82/sq mi)
- Time zone: UTC-5 (EST)
  - Summer (DST): UTC-4 (EDT)
- Postal Code: L0R, L0S
- Area codes: 905, 289, 365, and 742
- Website: www.wainfleet.ca

Wainfleet is a rural township in southern Niagara Region, Ontario, Canada.

There is a small and growing tourist industry, near and on Lake Erie at the southern area of Wainfleet called Long Beach. Wainfleet is also the home of the Marshville Heritage Village, a living history museum, recreating life in Ontario c. 1850–1910.

== Communities ==
The township includes the communities of Attercliffe, Beckett's Bridge, Belleview Beach, Burnaby, Camelot Beach, Chambers Corners, Long Beach, Morgan's Point, O'Reilly's Bridge, Ostryhon Corners, Perry, Wainfleet (known until the 1920s as Marshville), Wellandport (which straddles the border with the neighbouring Township of West Lincoln), Willow Bay and Winger. Wainfleet is near Willow Bay. The administrative offices of the township are located in Wainfleet.

== Coat of arms ==
Wainfleet Township's coat of arms consists of a white shield depicting a red cross, which symbolizes the arms of Lincoln, England, with a maple leaf in its centre. The maple leaf represents Canada and divides the shield into four quarters. Two of the quarters are filled with blue wavy lines symbolizing water. A third section contains a wagon wheel, and the other a harrow. The Harrow represents development of agriculture in the area. A cranberry bush crown on the coat of arms is indicative of the natural flora in Wainfleet.

Anglo-Saxon meaning of Wain "a wagon" and Fleet "a creek - a river" is "a creek through which a wagon can pass."

Two men stand on either side of the coat of arms: a Mississauga native who represents the tribe that settled a long Lake Ontario and a Franciscan Priest who represents Father Daillon, the first European among the priests that established the settlement in 1626–1678.

== Demographics ==
In the 2021 Census of Population conducted by Statistics Canada, Wainfleet had a population of 6,887 living in 2,615 of its 3,116 total private dwellings, a change of 8.1% from its 2016 population of 6,372. With a land area of 217.53 km^{2} (83.99 sq mi), it had a population density of 31.7/km^{2} (82.0/sq mi) in 2021.

Historical population
Year	Pop.	±%
1991	6,203	—
1996	6,253	+0.8%
2001	6,258	+0.1%
2006	6,601	+5.5%
2011	6,356	−3.7%
2016	6,372	+0.3%
2021	6,887	+8.1%

This population is diverse in age: the largest population bracket is the 45-49 age range with 595 residents, and the smallest is 85 and older with only 65 residents.

== People ==
Tony Dekker, singer/songwriter/guitarist for indie folk band Great Lake Swimmers, grew up on a farm in Wainfleet. A&E Network personality Tanya Memme is also a native of Wainfleet.

== Attractions ==
- Long Beach Conservation Area and Campground
- Wainfleet Bog Conservation Area
- Wainfleet Wetlands Conservation Area

== See also ==
- List of townships in Ontario
