= Tony Dekker =

Canadian singer and songwriter

- Born: Wainfleet, Ontario, Canada
- Genres: Indie folk
- Member of: Great Lake Swimmers

Tony Dekker is a Canadian singer and songwriter. Most noted as leader of the indie folk band Great Lake Swimmers, he has also released two solo albums.

== Early life and education ==
Born and raised in Wainfleet, Ontario, Dekker studied literature at the University of Western Ontario.

== Career ==
Dekker recorded his band's first two albums, Great Lake Swimmers and Bodies and Minds, in Wainfleet, in an abandoned grain silo and a Catholic church, respectively. By the time of the band's third album Ongiara, Dekker and the band were based in Toronto full time. In 2008, Dekker composed the score for Song Sung Blue, a documentary film.

In addition to his work with Great Lake Swimmers, Dekker released his debut solo album Prayer of the Woods in 2013. He followed up in 2014 with Tony Dekker Sings 10 Years of Zunior, an album of covers of other Canadian artists, including Old Man Luedecke, Chad VanGaalen, Christine Fellows, Ohbijou, Rae Spoon, Matt Mays, Martin Tielli, Jennifer Castle and Cadence Weapon.
