= Sarah Harmer =

Canadian musician (born 1970)

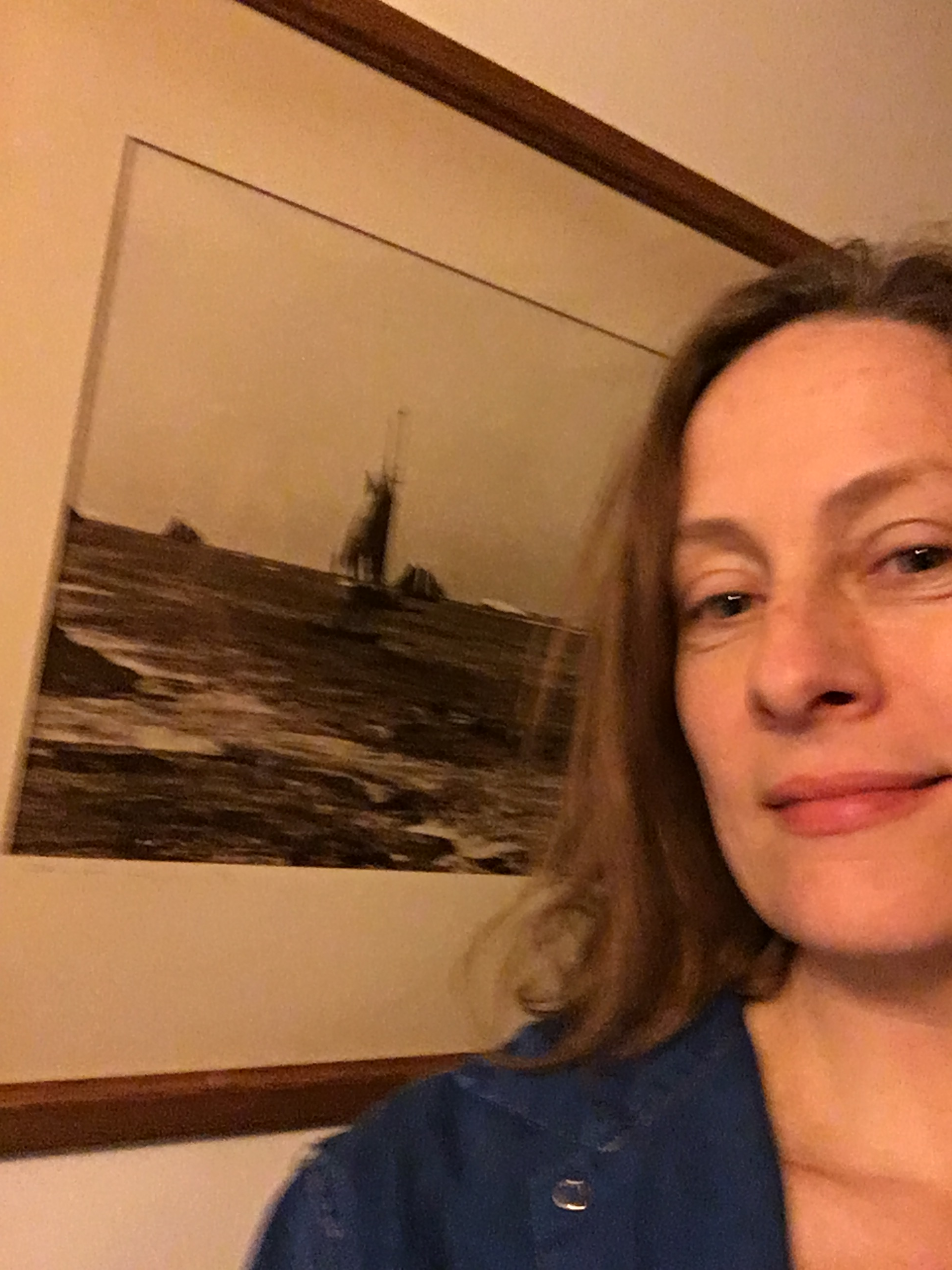
- Harmer in 2020

Background information
- Born: Sarah Lois Harmer; November 12, 1970 (age 55)
- Origin: Burlington, Ontario, Canada
- Genres: Folk; pop; rock
- Occupation: Singer-songwriter
- Instruments: Vocals; guitar; bass; drums
- Years active: 1987–present
- Label: Cold Snap
- Formerly of: The Saddletramps; Weeping Tile
- Website: sarahharmer.com

Sarah Lois Harmer (born November 12, 1970) is a Canadian singer, songwriter and environmental activist.

== Early life ==
Born and raised in Burlington, Ontario, Harmer gained her first exposure to the musical lifestyle as a teenager, when her older sister started taking her to Tragically Hip concerts.

== Career ==
At the age of 17, Harmer was invited to join a Toronto band, the Saddletramps. For three years, she performed with them while pursuing her studies in philosophy and women's studies at Queen's University.

After leaving the Saddletramps, Harmer put together a band of her own with several Kingston, Ontario musicians, and chose the name Weeping Tile. The band released its first independent cassette in 1994. Soon afterward, they signed to a major label, and the cassette was re-released in 1995 as Eepee. The band performed regularly on the rock club circuit and on campus radio with their subsequent albums, but never broke through to the mainstream, and broke up in 1998 after being dropped from their label.

Also in 1998, Harmer recorded a set of pop standards as a Christmas gift for her father. After hearing it, her friends and family convinced her to release it as an album; in 1999 she released it independently as Songs for Clem. Harmer began working on another album; in 2000, she released You Were Here. In 2001, she toured around Canada and the US in support of the album.

A poppier, more laid-back effort than her work with Weeping Tile, You Were Here was a commercial success, and led to the hit singles "Basement Apartment" and "Don't Get Your Back Up". The album also appeared on many critics' year-end lists, including Time magazine, which called it the year's best debut album. It was eventually certified platinum for sales of 100,000 copies in Canada. Almost half of the album (including both of its major hits) consisted of songs she had previously recorded with Weeping Tile or the Saddletramps.

In 2002, Harmer's song "Silver Road" was featured as the lead track of the soundtrack of the film Men With Brooms.

In 2004, Harmer released All of Our Names. The album included the singles "Almost", which made the top 20 on Canadian pop charts, and "Pendulums". All of Our Names won the JUNO Award for Best Adult Alternative Album, a new award category in 2005.

Her fourth album, I'm a Mountain, was released in Canada in November 2005 and in the United States in February 2006. It was nominated for the 2006 Polaris Music Prize, a jury-selected $20,000 cash prize for the Canadian album of the year. Also in 2005 she had an acting role in Anita Doron's film The End of Silence.

Harmer has also appeared as a guest vocalist on albums by other artists, including Blue Rodeo, Great Big Sea, Rheostatics, Bruce Cockburn, Luther Wright and the Wrongs, Loomer, Skydiggers, The Weakerthans, Neko Case, Great Lake Swimmers, The Tragically Hip, and Bob Wiseman.

In February 2007, Harmer received three Juno Award nominations. I'm a Mountain was nominated for Best Adult Alternative Album and her DVD Escarpment Blues won the JUNO Award for Best Music DVD. Harmer herself was also nominated for Songwriter of the Year for her work on "I Am Aglow", "Oleander", and "Escarpment Blues".

In 2010, Harmer released a fifth album, Oh Little Fire, which was nominated for three Juno Awards. The album signaled a shift toward a more rock-based sound.

In 2011, Harmer participated in the National Parks Project, visiting British Columbia's Gwaii Haanas National Park Reserve and Haida Heritage Site with Bry Webb, Jim Guthrie, and filmmaker Scott Smith. She was also commissioned by CBC Radio 2 to write an original campfire song for the network.

On August 19, 2016, Harmer and Jim Creeggan appeared on CBC Radio's Q to perform a live cover of The Tragically Hip's "Morning Moon". That year Harmer also performed at the Edmonton Folk Music Festival.

In 2018, Harmer contributed the song "Just Get Here" to the compilation album The Al Purdy Songbook. In the same year, she performed at the Juno Awards of 2018 in a tribute to the late Gord Downie, performing a medley of "Introduce Yerself" and "Bobcaygeon" in collaboration with Dallas Green and Kevin Hearn.

Her newest album, Are You Gone, was released in February 2020 on Arts & Crafts. It was longlisted for the 2020 Polaris Music Prize, and nominated for Best Adult Alternative Album at the Juno Awards of 2021.

== Activism ==
In 2005, Harmer co-founded PERL (Protecting Escarpment Rural Land), an organization which campaigned to protect the Niagara Escarpment from a proposed gravel development which would see some parts of wilderness near the escarpment removed. To support the organization, she and her acoustic band embarked on a tour of the escarpment, hiking the Bruce Trail and performing at theatres and community halls in towns along the way. A documentary DVD of this tour was released in 2006 as Escarpment Blues. Harmer also coauthored a book about the campaign, The Last Stand: A Journey Through the Ancient Cliff-Face Forest of the Niagara Escarpment, which was published in 2007. In October 2012, PERL won their case against the development.

Harmer has performed and canvassed in support of the NDP and politician Marilyn Churley, who also promoted the protection of the Niagara Escarpment. She has also performed in support of Ontario Green Party Leader and MPP Mike Schreiner.

On March 24, 2018, she joined the demonstration at Kinder Morgan's Burnaby Terminal to protest against the expansion of the Trans Mountain pipeline.

In February 2019, she spoke against the Ontario government's proposed Bill 66 at a Kingston City Council meeting.

In January 2022, Sarah helped launch the Reform Gravel Mining Coalition with co-chair Graham Flint. The RGMC seeks to reform the gravel mining industry in Ontario.

At the Juno Awards of 2025, Harmer was presented with the Juno Humanitarian Award in honour of her environmental activism.

== Family ==
Her niece Georgia Harmer, the daughter of Sarah's sister Mary with their former Weeping Tile bandmate Gord Tough, is a singer-songwriter whose debut album Stay in Touch was released in April 2022 on Arts & Crafts Productions.

== Discography ==
=== Albums ===
Title	Details	Peak chart positions		Certifications (sales thresholds)
Title	Details	CAN	US Heat	Certifications (sales thresholds)
Songs for Clem	Release date: 1999; Label: Cold Snap Records	—	—	
You Were Here	Release date: August 29, 2000; Label: Cold Snap Records	—	—	CAN: Platinum
All of Our Names	Release date: March 23, 2004; Label: Cold Snap Records	6	43	CAN: Gold
I'm a Mountain	Release date: November 15, 2005; Label: Cold Snap Records	31	—	CAN: Gold
Oh Little Fire	Release date: June 22, 2010; Label: Cold Snap Records	7	24	
Are You Gone	Release date: February 21, 2020; Label: Arts & Crafts Productions	63	—	
"—" denotes releases that did not chart

=== Singles ===
Year	Single	Album
2000	"Basement Apartment"	You Were Here
2001	"Don't Get Your Back Up"	You Were Here
2001	"Weakened State"	You Were Here
2003	"Silver Road"	Men with Brooms
2004	"Almost"	All of Our Names
2004	"Pendulums"	All of Our Names
2005	"I Am Aglow"	I'm a Mountain
2006	"Oleander"	I'm a Mountain
2010	"Captive"	Oh Little Fire
2018	"Just Get Here"	The Al Purdy Songbook
2019	"New Low"	Are You Gone
2020	"St. Peter's Bay"	Are You Gone

In 2007, Harmer also reunited with Weeping Tile to record a song, "Public Square", for the Rheostatics tribute album The Secret Sessions.

== Publications ==
- Peter E. Kelly, Douglas W. Larson, Sarah Harmer, The Last Stand : A Journey Through the Ancient Cliff-Face Forest of the Niagara Escarpment, Natural Heritage Books, 2007, ISBN 978-1-897045-19-0 (paperback).
