= Westray (disambiguation) =

Westray is one of the Orkney Islands in Scotland.

Westray may also refer to:

- Westray Airport, on Westray in the Orkney Islands
- Papa Westray, one of the Orkney Islands
- Westray Mine, in Nova Scotia, Canada
- "Westray", a song by Weeping Tile on their album Cold Snap (album) and EP eepee
- Ron Westray, jazz trombonist
