= Family business (disambiguation) =

A family business is a company owned and operated by members of one or more families.

Family Business may also refer to:

== Music ==
=== Albums ===
- Family Business (2-4 Family album), 1999
- Family Business (Ronnie Penque album), 2019
- A Family Business, a compilation soundtrack album from the TV series Brandy & Ray J: A Family Business, 2011
- The Family Business (album), an album by Jonas Brothers

=== Songs ===
- "Family Business" (song), by Kanye West from The College Dropout, 2004
- "Family Business", a song by Fish from Vigil in a Wilderness of Mirrors, 1990
- "Family Business", a song by the Fugees from The Score, 1996
- "Family Business", a song by Jesper Kyd from the 2018 Indian film Tumbbad

== Television ==
=== Films ===
- Family Business (1986 film), a French comedy film directed by Costa-Gavras
- Family Business (1989 film), an American crime film directed by Sidney Lumet

=== Series ===
- Family Business (American TV series), a 2003–2006 American reality series
- Family Business (British TV series), a 2004 British drama series
- Family Business (French TV series), a 2019 French streaming series
- The Family Business (Australian TV series), a 1989 Australian sitcom
- The Family Business (American TV series), an American crime family drama series that premiered in 2018
  - The Family Business: New Orleans, a spinoff

=== Episodes ===
- "Family Business" (American Dragon: Jake Long)
- "Family Business" (Burn Notice)
- "Family Business" (Courage the Cowardly Dog)
- "Family Business" (Highway Thru Hell)
- "Family Business" (Law & Order)
- "Family Business" (New Tricks)
- "Family Business" (Once Upon a Time)
- "Family Business" (Star Trek: Deep Space Nine)
- "Family Business" (Yu-Gi-Oh! GX)
- "The Family Business" (Dexter: New Blood)
- "The Family Business" (Ghosts)
- "The Family Business" (Kate & Allie)

== Other media ==
- Family Business (game), a dedicated deck card game
- Family Business Review, an academic journal
- Family Business, a 1985 novel by Vincent Patrick, basis for the 1989 film
- "Family Business", a 2014 graphic novel by Marvel Comics
- Family Business, a 2008 chapbook by Judith Arcana

== See also ==
- Family office
- Crime family
- Organized crime
