= Weeping Tile (band) =

Canadian rock band

- Weeping Tile, 1996. L-R: Sarah Harmer, Mary Harmer, Cam Giroux and Luther Wright.

Background information
- Also known as: The Wadds
- Origin: Kingston, Ontario, Canada
- Genres: Alternative rock
- Years active: 1992–1998, 2007
- Labels: Warner, Cold Snap, Seed
- Past members: Sarah Harmer; Joe Chithalen; Gord Tough; Chris Smirnios "Sister Mary" Harmer; Sean Kelly; Luther Wright; Cam Giroux; Rebecca "Sticky" Henderson; Paul Gurnsey; Chris Ward

Weeping Tile was a Canadian rock band formed in 1992 in Kingston, Ontario.

== History ==
The band was started by singer-songwriter Sarah Harmer in 1992, when she was invited to fill in for the opening band at a Thomas Trio and the Red Albino concert in Ottawa, Ontario. Taking the name Weeping Tile from the pipes that are placed around the foundations of homes to draw groundwater away from the building, she did the show as a duo with Joe Chithalen on bass, and later added other musicians, Gord Tough on guitar and Chris Smirnios on drums, to round out the lineup.

The band released a seven-song debut cassette in 1994, and was quickly signed to a major label. That cassette was re-released in 1995 with the title Eepee, and in 1996 they released Cold Snap, their first full-length album.

Between Eepee and Cold Snap, the band's line-up changed almost completely, leaving Harmer as the only original member. Chithalen was replaced by Harmer's sister Mary, Tough was replaced by Luther Wright, and Smirnios was replaced by Cam Giroux. Upon the departure of Mary Harmer, Spin the Susan alumnus Rebecca Henderson (a.k.a. Sticky) was brought in on bass guitar. Her presence led to the formation of The Wadds, an alter-ego band which would perform after the Weeping Tile set was completed, usually with the musicians switching instruments. This gave Harmer the opportunity to demonstrate her versatility on the drums, and showcased Sticky as a bandleader and singer. Some live recordings of these performances are extant. The Wadds also recorded five songs but they were never released.

In 1997, they released their follow-up album, Valentino. Although they were a popular draw on the live music circuit and a regular presence on campus radio, Weeping Tile never broke through to mainstream success, and in 1998 they were dropped from their record label. Later that year they recorded another independent cassette, This Great Black Night, but shortly afterward the band broke up.

According to Harmer, "We were never a super ambitious commercial band. We just did our thing and we were lucky to be able to get people to hear our music. It was a great situation, but it wasn't economical for [Warner]. When we got dropped, it was freeing, it was good." She attributes the band's breakup soon afterward to interpersonal dynamics rather than being dropped from the label.

== Post-breakup activities ==
Sticky partnered with Merrill Nisker in a live project called The Shit, and later started a group called Ass Machine. The latter group released three independent albums and was locally notorious for its on-stage aggressiveness, but no record deals ensued, despite having received media attention as a band worth watching during the 1999 NXNE Festival. Sticky later played bass with the bands Music Maul and Velvet Claws, and released the solo album Life on the Sideboard in 2013.

Harmer covered "Silverado", a song by Music Maul's Trevor Henderson, on her 2010 solo album Oh Little Fire.

Harmer went on to success as a solo artist, and Wright's new band, Luther Wright and the Wrongs, have made six albums to date and attracted considerable attention with their 2001 release Rebuild the Wall, a country music interpretation of Pink Floyd's album The Wall.

Although Weeping Tile have not recorded a new album as a group since the breakup, they still play together on stage in Kingston, and sometimes perform on each other's solo recordings. They also recorded a cover of Rheostatics' "Public Square" for the 2007 tribute album The Secret Sessions, with both Wright and Harmer sharing vocal duties.

== Related ==
Mary Harmer and Gord Tough's daughter, Georgia Harmer, is a singer-songwriter who released her debut album in 2022.

== Discography ==
=== EPs ===
- 1995: Eepee
- 1998: This Great Black Night

=== Albums ===
- 1996: Cold Snap
- 1997: Valentino

=== Compilations ===
- 2007: The Secret Sessions
