= Valentino (album) =

Studio album by Weeping Tile
- Released: August 26, 1997
- Recorded: 1997
- Genre: Alternative rock
- Label: Warner Music Canada
- Producer: Weeping Tile, Robin Aubé

Weeping Tile chronology
Cold Snap (1996)	Valentino (1997)	This Great Black Night (1998)

Valentino is an album by Canadian band Weeping Tile, released in 1997. It was the band's second and final album for Warner Music Canada. "South of Me" and "Can't Get Off" were released as singles.

== Track listing ==
All tracks are written by Sarah Harmer.

Valentino track listing
No.	Title	Length
1.	"South of Me"	4:08
2.	"Through Yr Radio"	3:34
3.	"Unshaven"	3:06
4.	"Judy G."	4:17
5.	"2""	4:51
6.	"I'm Late!"	3:01
7.	"Old Perfume"	3:05
8.	"I Repeat"	4:02
9.	"Can't Get Off"	2:37
10.	"Every Good Story"	3:50
11.	"Chicken"	3:26
12.	"Tom's Shoe Repair"	3:38
13.	"Goin' Out"	4:28
14.	"8 Guitars and a Broken Nose"	2:11
Total length:		50:14

A French language version of "South of Me", titled "Au sud de moi", was also recorded and released as a B-side on the "South of Me" single.

== Personnel ==
- Sarah Harmer – vocals, guitar
- Luther Wright – guitar, bass, backing vocals
- Sticky – bass, flute, backing vocals
- Cam Giroux – drums, backing vocals
