= Eepee =

eepee

EP by Weeping Tile
- Released: 1995
- Recorded: 1994
- Genre: Alternative rock
- Label: Warner Music Canada
- Producer: Weeping Tile

Weeping Tile chronology
| eepee (1995) | Cold Snap (1996) |

eepee is the debut EP by Weeping Tile. It was the band's first recording, released in 1995.

Originally released independently, eepee was rereleased the following year after the band signed with Warner Music Canada.

== Track listing ==
All songs written by Sarah Harmer, except "Don't Let it Bring You Down" by Neil Young. Some lyrics in "Westray" are patterned after Robert W. Service's poem "The Cremation of Sam McGee".

1. "Anyone" – 3:13
2. "Basement Apt." – 4:04
3. "Dogs and Thunder" – 5:09
4. "Don't Let it Bring You Down" – 3:51
5. "The Room with the Sir John A. View" – 5:04
6. "Westray" – 4:33
7. "King Lion" – 5:03

== Credits ==
- Sarah Harmer – vocals, guitar
- Joe Chithalen – bass, viola, cello, backing vocals
- Gord Tough – guitar, backing vocals
- Chris Smirnios – drums
- Jason Euringer – bass, backing vocals
- Luther Wright – backing vocals
- Spencer Evans – piano
- James Chithalen – cello
- Grant Ethier – backing vocals
