= Cold Snap (Weeping Tile album) =

Studio album by Weeping Tile
- Released: 1996
- Recorded: 1995–1996
- Genre: Alternative Rock
- Length: 39:04
- Label: Warner Music Canada
- Producer: Weeping Tile, Robin Aubé

Weeping Tile chronology
eepee (1994)	Cold Snap (1996)	Valentino (1997)

Professional ratings
Review scores
Source	Rating
Allmusic	3/5 stars

Cold Snap is an album by the Canadian band Weeping Tile. As the band's first major label release, the album features a more rock-oriented sound than their independent debut. The title track and "UFO Rosie" were released as singles.

== Track listing ==
All songs written by Sarah Harmer

1. "Poked" – 2:59
2. "Cold Snap" – 2:48
3. "Pushover" – 2:27
4. "UFO Rosie" – 3:46
5. "Good Fortune" – 3:44
6. "In the Road" – 4:10
7. "L'il Interlude" – 0:44
8. "The Grin" – 3:39
9. "First Lady" – 0:41
10. "Joint Account" – 2:43
11. "Dolores Haze" – 0:43
12. "Westray" – 4:17
13. "The Highway" – 4:39
14. "Handkerchiefs and Napkins" – 1:44

== Personnel ==
- Sarah Harmer – vocals, guitar, piano, cowbell
- Luther Wright – guitar, backing vocals
- Mary Harmer (credited as "Sister Mary") – bass, backing vocals
- Paul Gurnsey – drums
- John Richardson – drums
- Kevin Fox – cello
- Pauli Ryan – tambourine
- Cam Giroux – percussion
- Robin Aubé – helicopter bass
