= This Great Black Night =

EP by Weeping Tile
- Released: 1998
- Recorded: 1998
- Genre: Alternative rock
- Label: Cold Snap Records
- Producer: Sarah Harmer and Luther Wright

Weeping Tile chronology
Valentino (1997)	This Great Black Night (1998)

This Great Black Night is a 1998 EP by Weeping Tile.

It was recorded following the band's departure from Warner Music Canada. It was sold only at live shows; the band toured that year as a supporting act for Ani DiFranco.

The EP sold out, and is now considered a collector's item. However, three of the EP's five tracks were later rerecorded by Sarah Harmer on her 2000 solo album You Were Here, and another was rerecorded for her 2005 album I'm A Mountain.

== Track listing ==
All songs written by Sarah Harmer.

1. "Weakened State"
2. "Lodestar"
3. "Odessa Nights"
4. "Coffee Stain"
5. "I'm A Mountain"
