= Family Business (game) =

Dedicated deck card game

- Original 1982 edition, Mayfair Games
- Players: 2–6
- Setup time: 5 minutes
- Playing time: 30 minutes
- Chance: Medium
- Skills: Alliances

Family Business is a card game of "mob vengeance" for 2 to 6 players, published by Mayfair Games in 1982, and then again in 1989.

== Components ==
The 1989 Mayfair edition of the game includes:

- One 54-card deck, composed of six families of nine mobsters drawn from historical gangs:
  - The Moran Gang (headed by Bugs Moran)
  - The New York Mob
  - The Capone Mob (headed by Al Capone)
  - Murder, Inc.
  - The Purple Gang
  - The Bank Robbers (including Bonnie and Clyde, Alvin Karpis, John Dillinger, and Ma Barker)
- One 54-card deck of action cards, composed of 26 "contract" cards, 6 "attack" cards, 10 "block" cards and 14 "rescue" cards.
- One "Up Against the Wall" card
- One Cemetery card
- a 4-page rule sheet

== Game play ==
The purpose of the game is to use contract or attack cards to force other players to place their mobsters in the "Up Against the Wall" queue, where they are in danger of being eliminated from the game.

=== Setup ===
Each player is given one family of nine mobsters, which are displayed face-up on the table in front of the player. The Up Against the Wall card and Cemetery cards are placed face-up in the centre of the table. The deck of action cards is shuffled and placed facedown on the table.

=== Play ===
- If Mob War is active, then the first mobster in the Up Against the Wall queue is eliminated. (see Mob War below)
- The active player draws a card and then plays a contract card or attack card against another player, or a rescue card to save one or more of the player's mobsters from elimination.
  - If the active player plays a contract card
    - and the defending player plays a block card, then play passes to the defending player.
    - and the contract card is not blocked, then the defending player places a mobster in the queue beside the Against the Wall. If, as a result, the queue exceeds five mobsters, then a Mob War starts.
  - If the active player plays an attack card, and this results in the queue beside the Against the Wall exceeding five mobsters, then a Mob War starts. Regardless, play passes to the active player's left.
  - If the active player plays a rescue card,
    - and it is not blocked, then play passes to the player on the active player's left.
    - and it is blocked, the play passes to the player who blocked the rescue.

=== Mob War ===
A Mob War automatically starts when the Up Against the Wall queue exceeds five mobsters. (Some attack cards can also start a Mob War even if there are five or less mobsters in queue.)

Once a Mob War has begun, at the start of each player's turn, the mobster first in the Up Against the Wall queue the is permanently removed from play and placed on the Cemetery card.

The Mob War ends when all mobsters on the wall have been eliminated, or when someone plays a rescue card that ends the Mob War.

Near the end of the game, when there are six or fewer surviving mobsters, the Mob War is continuous and cannot be stopped.

=== Winning the game ===
The player who is the last to have a surviving mobster is the winner.

== Reception ==
In the March 1989 edition of Games International (Issue #3), Brian Walker was happy this "very good game" had been reissued, since it had previously been "very difficult to obtain in the UK when it was first published by the Illinois based Mayfair Games." Walker pointed out that this was a game of luck, not skill, but concluded by giving the game an above-average rating of 4 out of 5, saying, "Go ahead, make your day. Buy this game."

In the February 1991 edition of Dragon (Issue 166), Jim Bambra called the game "an ideal ending to an evening of role-playing when the adventure is finished but it’s too early to go home... It's fast, fun, and simple enough to pick up quickly."

== Reviews ==
- Backstab #6 ("Service Compris"; French version)
- Games #99
- Jeux & Stratégie #59
- Family Games: The 100 Best
