= Joe Chithalen =

- Born: Francis Joseph Chithalen; November 17, 1967
- Origin: Canada
- Died: May 1, 1999 (aged 31) Amsterdam, Netherlands
- Genres: Rock, funk
- Occupation: Guitarist
- Instrument: Bass guitar

Francis Joseph (Joe) Chithalen (November 17, 1967 – May 1, 1999) was a Canadian musician. He was a bassist for a number of bands in the Kingston music scene of the 1990s, most notably Weeping Tile, The Mahones, Bucket, Wild Blues Yonder, and Bloom.

== Death ==
On May 1, 1999, Chithalen died in Amsterdam shortly after a Mahones concert, said to be from ingesting food containing peanuts. His former Weeping Tile bandmate Sarah Harmer wrote "You Were Here", the title track from her 2000 solo album, in memory of Chithalen.

After his death, The Joe Chithalen Memorial Musical Instrument Lending Library (JOE'S M.I.L.L.) was established in Kingston, Ontario by some of his friends (like members of The Tragically Hip), family and past bandmates (including the late Wally High). The Library loans instruments to aspiring musicians who can't afford them. Some of Chithalen's own bass guitars and other stringed instruments sit in the lending Library, and are occasionally loaned out for performances.
