= Rebuild the Wall =

Studio album by Luther Wright and the Wrongs
- Released: 2001
- Genre: Bluegrass
- Length: 61:42
- Label: Snakeye Muzak

Luther Wright and the Wrongs chronology
Roger's Waltz (1999)	Rebuild the Wall (2001)	Guitar Pickin' Martyrs (2003)

Rebuild the Wall is a 2001 album by Canadian alternative country band Luther Wright and the Wrongs. The album is a cover of Pink Floyd's progressive rock classic The Wall, reimagining each track as a bluegrass country song. Guests include Sarah Harmer and Carolyn Mark.

== Reception ==
Professional ratings
Review scores
Source	Rating
Allmusic	3/5 stars

Music critic Robert Kaups, writing for Allmusic, suggested "music fans with more open (and less cynical) minds may well find that this prog-bluegrass fusion works better than it should."

== Track listing ==
1. "In the Flesh?"
2. "The Thin Ice"
3. "Another Brick in the Wall, Pt. 1"
4. "The Happiest Days of Our Lives"
5. "Another Brick in the Wall, Pt. 2"
6. "Mother"
7. "Goodbye Blue Sky"
8. "Empty Spaces"
9. "Young Lust"
10. "One of My Turns"
11. "Don't Leave Me Now"
12. "Another Brick in the Wall, Pt. 3"
13. "Goodbye Cruel World"
14. "Hey You"
15. "Is There Anybody Out There?"
16. "Nobody Home"
17. "Vera"
18. "Bring the Boys Back Home"
19. "Comfortably Numb"
20. "The Show Must Go On"
21. "In the Flesh"
22. "Run Like Hell"
23. "Waiting for the Worms"
24. "Stop"
25. "The Trial"
26. "Outside the Wall"
