= Luther Wright and the Wrongs =

Canadian alternative country and bluegrass band

- Also known as: Butterfingers
- Origin: Kingston, Ontario, Canada
- Genres: Alternative country; roots music
- Years active: 1998–present
- Label: Snakeye Muzak/Wolfe Island Records
- Members: Luther Wright; Tara Dunphy; James Taylor; Kelsey McNulty; Cam Giroux Burke Carroll Casey Fisher
- Past members: Dan Curtis; Dan Whiteley; H.Chris Brown; Sean Kelly; Miranda Mulholland; Megan Palmer; Mauro Sepe; Jason Mercer; Brian Flynn; Olesh Maximew; Julie Penner
- Website: lutherwright.com

Luther Wright and the Wrongs are a Canadian alternative country and bluegrass band formed in 1998 in Kingston, Ontario.

== History ==
The band began as a side project for Wright when he was a member of Weeping Tile. When that band amicably parted ways following their 1998 recording This Great Black Night, the Wrongs became Wright's primary band. The band membership has shifted a number of times since its inception. Original members Wright, Cam Giroux (drums), Sean Kelly (bass), Brian Flynn (fiddle), Dan Curtis (electric guitar), and Olesh Maximew (pedal steel guitar) toured Canada and established themselves on the burgeoning alt-country scene. Consistent contributors and guests include Sarah Harmer, Jason Mercer, and Chris Brown. Pedal steel player Burke Carroll joined the band in 2001 and was followed by Columbus, Ohio-based fiddler Megan Palmer. Other band members that have come and gone and come back are mandolin player Dan Whiteley, fiddler Miranda Mulholland, bassist James Taylor, drummers, Casey Fisher, Bruce Martin, Daria Grace and Russ Meissner, vocalist and pianist Emily Fennell, keyboardist Hugh Christopher Brown, and long time friend and guitarist Tony Scherr.

The band's debut album, Hurtin' for Certain, recorded at Grant Avenue studio in Hamilton, was released in 1997 on Snakeye Muzak. Guelph based D.R.O.G. records released Roger's Waltz in 1999. Both of these albums are original roots/country efforts with the songs written primarily by Wright. Guitarist Dan Curtis added two songs to Roger's Waltz, one a snappy duet entitled "Celia" with Sarah Harmer.

The band's best-known album, Rebuild the Wall, was released in 2001 on Back Porch Records. It is a track-by-track reimagining of Pink Floyd's progressive rock classic The Wall as a bluegrass country album. The band signed with Universal Records Canada and Back Porch Records in the U.S. and embarked on a North American tour to perform their version of The Wall, intermixed with their own compositions.

Their fourth album, Guitar Pickin' Martyrs, was also released on Back Porch and Universal Canada in 2003.

In 2006, the band released Instrumentality on Snakeye Muzak. They also recorded two tracks for the 2006 Steve Goodman tribute album My Old Man, reimagining Goodman's "City of New Orleans" and "Jessie's Jig".

Man of Your Dreams was released March 25, 2008, on Snakeye Muzak, distributed by Outside Music. Hearts and Lonely Hunters was released on November 25, 2015, by Wolfe Island Records and distributed by Outside Music. The members of Luther Wright and the Wrongs have also recorded two albums for children under the name 'Butterfingers'. Wright continues to record and produce local Kingston area bands including Rueben de Groot, Emily Fennell, Dan & Jenny Whiteley with Riley Bagus and Vancouver based Rusty Ford.

Mother
The first thirty seconds of "Mother" from Rebuild the Wall.

== Discography ==
- 1997: Hurtin' for Certain (Snakeye Muzak)
- 1999: Roger's Waltz (Snakeye Muzak)
- 2001: Rebuild the Wall (Snakeye Muzak)
- 2003: Guitar Pickin' Martyrs (Snakeye Muzak)
- 2006: Instrumentality (Snakeye Muzak)
- 2008: Man of Your Dreams (Snakeye Muzak)
- 2012: The Jack Grace Band with Luther Wright, Live at The Acoustic Grill
- 2015: Hearts and Lonely Hunters (Snakeye Muzak)
