= List of Ghosts (American TV series) episodes =

Ghosts is an American television sitcom about married New Yorkers Samantha and Jay Arondekar, who believe that their dreams have come true when they inherit a beautiful country house, only to find that it is falling apart and inhabited by ghosts who died on the property and are now bound to the area, appearing as they did at the times of their deaths, until they can reach the afterlife.It was adapted to American television for CBS by Joe Port and Joe Wiseman from the British series of the same name. Port & Wiseman serve as showrunners. The American series premiered on October 7, 2021.

In February 2025, the series was renewed for a fifth and sixth season. The sixth season premiered on October 29, 2026. As of October 29, 2026, 96 episodes of Ghosts have aired, currently in its sixth season.

== Series overview ==
Season	Episodes	Originally released	
Season	Episodes	First released	Last released
1	18	October 7, 2021	April 21, 2022
2	22	September 29, 2022	May 11, 2023
3	10	February 15, 2024	May 2, 2024
4	22	October 17, 2024	May 8, 2025
5	22	October 16, 2025	May 21, 2026
6	TBA	October 29, 2026	TBA

== Episodes ==
=== Season 1 (2021–22) ===
No. overall	No. in season	Title	Directed by	Written by	Original release date	Prod. code	U.S. viewers (millions)
1	1	"Pilot"	Trent O'Donnell	Teleplay by : Joe Port & Joe Wiseman	October 7, 2021	GHO101	5.52
Samantha "Sam" and Jayanth "Jay" Arondekar, a young married couple living in a cramped New York City apartment, inherit Woodstone Manor, an old Upstate mansion, from Sophie Brimble, Sam's great aunt. However, the house is inhabited by ghosts from different eras of American history who died on the property, are invisible and intangible to the living, can phase through walls but not floors or ceilings, cannot eat or drink but require sleep, and possess individual powers related to either their lives or their deaths. Learning that Sam and Jay plan to open a bed and breakfast, the ghosts struggle to haunt them out of the house, fearing constant disturbance and risk of being walked through by the living, a deeply painful experience for ghosts. Party-loving stockbroker Trevor, the most recently deceased ghost who can interact with the corporeal world to a limited degree, accidentally causes Sam to trip over a vase he moves and fall down the stairs. At the hospital, she is placed under an induced coma that leaves her briefly clinically dead. Two weeks later, she revives with the ability to see, hear, and interact with the ghosts.
2	2	"Hello!"	Trent O'Donnell	Joe Port & Joe Wiseman	October 7, 2021	GHO102	5.52
Sam tries to ignore the ghosts, with Jay assuring her they are a symptom of her injuries and induced coma. However, after encountering more ghosts during a doctor's appointment and in the mansion's basement, she eventually accepts their existence. Because she and Jay can't back out of the renovation project since they will go bankrupt if they try, and because the ghosts can't leave the property until they can move on into the afterlife (which they refer to as being "sucked off", though most of them are unaware the phrase is considered innuendo in modern times except for Trevor, who enjoys using it), Sam offers to fulfill each of the ghosts' requests so they can cohabitate peacefully. Jay comes to accept the existence of the ghosts when a collection of basement-dwelling cholera victims give him instructions via Sam on how to fix the house's heating system. Meanwhile, Revolutionary officer Isaac enlists Trevor's help in looking up Alexander Hamilton on the Internet and discovers Hamilton became greatly successful, while Isaac is a literal footnote in history.
3	3	"Viking Funeral"	Trent O'Donnell	Josh Malmuth	October 14, 2021	GHO103	5.27
After beginning the renovations at the mansion, the construction crews uncovers the remains of Viking Thorfinn, the oldest ghost, which poses a threat to the renovations, so Samantha and Jay attempt to dispose of the remains. Despite learning the value of Viking skeletons and being tempted to sell Thor's remains to fund the renovations, Sam and Jay ultimately hold a Viking funeral. Thor appears to begin ascending into the afterlife, only to realize the light is coming from a police cruiser responding to the flames from the funeral boat.
4	4	"Dinner Party"	Trent O'Donnell	John Blickstead & Trey Kollmer	October 21, 2021	GHO104	5.20
Sam and Jay meet the Farnsbys, an older couple living on an adjacent property, who attempt to sabotage their renovations, which leads them to invite them over for dinner. At the dinner party, the ghosts attempt to sabotage Sam until she points out they need her to maintain a connection to the world of the living. In the end, with the help of the ghosts, especially scoutmaster Pete's knowledge of 1980s television, the Farnsbys promise to support their permit applications for their renovations.
5	5	"Halloween"	Katie Locke O'Brien	Talia Bernstein	October 28, 2021	GHO106	5.76
The ghosts are unable to get into the Halloween spirit, being unable to participate (e.g. eating candy and wearing costumes) and thinking it to be insulting to ghosts because of the bedsheets. Taking advantage of Sam's ability to see and hear them, Isaac, Gilded Age aristocrat Hetty, Lenape storyteller Sasappis, and Thorfinn guard the mansion against middle school vandals. Meanwhile, lounge singer Alberta, Pete and Trevor are horrified by media depictions of ghosts and how they're treated as they watch Ghostbusters. After Thorfinn uses his powers to accidentally set the front yard gazebo on fire and Isaac blames one of the young vandals, the ghosts argue over whether to tell Sam the truth.
6	6	"Pete's Wife"	Trent O'Donnell	Kira Kalush	November 4, 2021	GHO105	5.94
As Sam introduces the ghosts to the Internet and social media, Trevor believes that he fathered a child from one of his one-night stands in 2000. After Sam locates Pete's wife Carol online, she invites her to the mansion at Pete's insistence, using his old Trooper's manual as an excuse. Pete finds that his wife and best friend were not only involved before his death, but are now married and he is furious until Sam reads one of his notes from his manual on forgiveness. Pete's daughter, Laura, then reveals his grandson has been named after him in his honor. Meanwhile, Thorfinn and Sasappis become obsessed with a reality show, which the former binge-watches without the latter.
7	7	"Flower's Article"	Katie Locke O'Brien	Emily Schmidt	November 11, 2021	GHO107	5.23
To land a permanent job at a local magazine, Sam decides to write a human interest article about a 'Robin Hood-esque' bank robbery carried out by forgetful hippie Flower during her time in a 'commune', but Flower refuses to be interviewed as she swore to secrecy. Having heard about the incident ad nauseam since Flower's death, Isaac and Alberta decide to learn about the robbery on Sam's behalf. Meanwhile, Sam encounters Shiki: the ghost of a Lenape woman on whom Sasappis had a crush, and she and Jay try to establish long-distance communication between them.
8	8	"D&D"	Nick Wong	John Blickstead & Trey Kollmer	November 18, 2021	GHO109	5.42
Sam volunteers to help Jay and the ghosts play Dungeons & Dragons together when Jay's D&D group abandons him. Also, Sam discovers that an old shed on the mansion's grounds was a British barracks during the Revolutionary War, now occupied by three ghosts of British soldiers, one of whom, Nigel, learns that Isaac, who has secretly requited feelings for him, accidentally shot and killed him.
9	9	"Alberta's Fan"	Nick Wong	Lauren Bridges	December 2, 2021	GHO108	5.46
Todd Pearlman, an obsessive fan of Alberta's, visits the mansion to do research for a biography he is writing about her and discovers that her briefcase contains vintage moonshine. He nearly dies from drinking it, as it was poisoned, confirming Alberta's suspicions that she was murdered. Elsewhere, Thorfinn tries reconnecting with Hetty during walks outside the mansion, as he remembers that she could see and hear ghosts as a child, which is a rare gift among living human children.
10	10	"Possession"	Katie Locke O'Brien	Rishi Chitkara	December 9, 2021	GHO111	5.75
While trying to repair a sconce, Jay accidentally falls on top of Hetty, who possesses him and takes on-and-off control of his body. Sam struggles to keep this a secret from a wedding planner who is difficult to impress and visits the mansion to sample Jay's cooking. Refusing to be exorcised, Hetty attempts to escape the mansion in Jay's car, only to be separated from him because she cannot leave the mansion's grounds.
11	11	"Sam's Mom"	Katie Locke O'Brien	John Timothy	January 6, 2022	GHO110	6.48
Sam and Jay travel to the restaurant where Sam's mother died to find out if she became a ghost. On arrival, they find her. After some tense moments with her daughter, Sam's mother admits that she loves and admires her and ascends to the afterlife. Meanwhile, Sasappis reveals that he overheard that Pete has feelings for Alberta. When it appears that she doesn't reciprocate those feelings, Pete denies it, and convinces Cholera Victim Nancy to pretend to be his girlfriend in exchange for getting to move upstairs.
12	12	"Jay's Sister"	Christine Gernon	Julia Harter & Ian Murphy	January 13, 2022	GHO112	6.47
Jay's sister, Bela, comes to visit after a break up, but reveals that she's been having great conversations with someone online. Sam and Jay are shocked when they realize that it's Trevor. Trevor reveals that he used their iPad to make a dating account. When Bela discovers the account on the iPad, she assumes that Jay created the profile and is furious. Sam tells her the truth about her talking to ghosts, and while Bela is as first skeptical, Sam is able to convince her with the help of the ghosts. Meanwhile, Nancy, still pretending to be Pete's girlfriend, threatens to tell Alberta the truth if Pete doesn't start to be more assertive. While Pete initially listens to her, he becomes upset when it leads to the other ghosts fighting. When Pete assertively tells Nancy that he enjoys being the one who keeps the peace, Nancy is proud of him for standing up for himself and pretends to break up with him and goes back to the cholera pit.
13	13	"The Vault"	Christine Gernon	Joe Port & Joe Wiseman	January 20, 2022	GHO113	6.68
On the eve of hosting a wedding of a major online influencer, a worker discovers a passageway and vault under the house containing the ghost and corpse of Hetty's amoral husband Elias (Matt Walsh), a robber baron. Shocked at how modern Hetty has become, he uses his power (making living people sexually aroused by passing through them) to destroy the wedding, hoping to force Sam and Jay into bankruptcy and out of the house. Sam and Jay plan to sell his corpse's gold pocket watch to temporarily thwart his plan. When Elias threatens to become a permanent nuisance, Hetty tells him to "Go to hell", at which point ominous unseen forces drag him through the floor. Despite it being unclear if Hetty caused this to happen, she uses the threat of this power to intimidate the other ghosts.
14	14	"Ghostwriter"	Kimmy Gatewood	Josh Malmuth & John Timothy	February 24, 2022	GHO114	5.85
Sasappis wants to help Sam write a creative piece for her planned inn's Website, although she dismisses his unusual manner of writing. After Trevor accidentally deletes the site while trying to open it for editing, Sass admits the truth and explains that his father believed he had a gift for storytelling, but was worried his son would fail at it the same way he did. After symbolically giving his storyteller's feather to Sam, Sass tells a meaningful Lenape legend that moves her, Jay, and the other ghosts. Meanwhile, Pete feels lonely with no one else around who wants to watch basketball with him until he learns Flower has an extensive knowledge of the sport.
15	15	"Thorapy"	Kimmy Gatewood	John Blickstead & Trey Kollmer	March 3, 2022	GHO115	5.52
As pairs of ghosts begin bunking with each other in various bedrooms to accommodate future living guests, Sam and Jay learn that Thorfinn has been experiencing night terrors for the past 500 years. Jay arranges for a therapist to visit the mansion with Sam pretending to have Thor's problems so she can interpret them for the therapist. Sam discovers Thor killed a friend named Oskar after being abandoned by his shipmates and assumes Oskar was human until Thor explains he was a squirrel that he ate for survival. Meanwhile, feeling nervous about his secret attraction to Nigel, Isaac feigns romantic interest in Hetty, his bunkmate, but hearing Thorfinn's story inspires him to come out to her in private.
16	16	"Trevor's Pants"	Trent O'Donnell	Kira Kalush & Talia Bernstein	March 31, 2022	GHO116	6.23
Trevor recognizes a man seeking to purchase the timepiece found on Elias's corpse as Ari, one of his former friends and fellow stockbrokers at Lehman Brothers. He then recounts the story of his death and how he lost his pants. When Pinkus, another former coworker, was promoted to Trevor's group at the company, they celebrated at Woodstone Manor, as David, another friend, was the late Sophie's son. Although Trevor claims he died of a drug and alcohol overdose after having sex with a limousine driver, Sasappis reveals he actually died after giving his wallet, pants, and boxer shorts to Pinkus, who was to make his way back to the city wearing nothing but a white T-shirt in a ritualistic haze as part of the friends' "bro code". Sam helps Trevor exact revenge on Ari by playing a prank that would force him to follow the same haze, and Ari agrees to pay twice his original price for the timepiece. Meanwhile, Thorfinn tells Flower about his romantic feelings for her, although she would prefer to have group sex with an additional ghost. After going through several candidates, they agree to take their relationship more slowly.
17	17	"Attic Girl"	Trent O'Donnell	Emily Schmidt & Lauren Bridges	April 14, 2022	GHO117	5.96
Stephanie, a teenage ghost who was murdered by a chainsaw killer on her prom night in 1987, comes down from the attic after sleeping there for a year. For her one day of being awake, she invites the ghosts to a ghost-only prom. Alberta discovers she can communicate with Sam and Jay's new Alexa. Sam opens up to Jay about how she was catfished by high school classmates into thinking she had a romantic French penpal who wanted to come to her prom night. Pete overhears only part of the story and shares it with the other ghosts, inspiring Stephanie to play a mean prank on Sam by having Alberta order a bag of baguettes via Alexa. Feeling betrayed after learning the whole story, the main ghosts abandon Stephanie, but Sam convinces them to help her organize a prom anyway.
18	18	"Farnsby & B"	Cortney Carrillo	Joe Port & Joe Wiseman	April 21, 2022	GHO118	6.25
When Sam and Jay refuse the Farnsbys' offer to buy their bed and breakfast, the Farnsbys open a rival B&B to drive the younger couple out of business. Thorfinn reveals that he placed a Norse curse on the mansion to prevent a B&B from ever being opened; and he claims the curse, which may or may not have been real, has caused every misfortune over the past season, including Sam's accident that gave her the ability to see the ghosts. Sam almost reverses the alleged curse by mixing cinnamon and sugar in hot water but decides not to do so, as she does not want to take the very small chance of losing her ability. She tells Jay that, no matter how many obstacles they encounter, they should continue working to get their business started. Meanwhile, Isaac sets out to tell Nigel that he likes him but is heartbroken when Jenkins, a subordinate, informs him that Nigel has ascended into the afterlife. Nigel later confronts Isaac, believing he was having an affair with Thorfinn, and the Revolutionary-era ghosts clear up their confusion and admit that they like each other. The Arondekars keep their business after they win by forfeit in a pickleball match against the Farnsbys, but, as they welcome their first guests, they fall through a weakened floor into the basement.

=== Season 2 (2022–23) ===
No. overall	No. in season	Title	Directed by	Written by	Original release date	Prod. code	U.S. viewers (millions)
19	1	"Spies"	Trent O'Donnell	John Blickstead & Trey Kollmer	September 29, 2022	GHO201	6.46
Sam and Jay welcome Tom and Debbie, their first guests since the floor incident, which earned their B&B a one-star review on Yelp, but the ghosts become suspicious of the newcomers' overly friendly demeanor. When the Arondekars discover Tom and Debbie's reputation for writing harshly negative reviews, the ghosts spy on them for Sam against Jay's wishes, and she struggles to act on the ghosts' multitude of suggestions to appease the visiting couple. Taking offense to his wife and cooking being insulted, Jay stands up for Sam, who tells the guests what they know about their Yelp activity, which they mistakenly thought was anonymous and ultimately earns the B&B a five-star review. Meanwhile, Nigel confides to Isaac how he feels about Thorfinn energetically disrupting their TV time, and when Isaac asks Thor to be more quiet, the Viking dejectedly leaves for the cholera pit. That evening, he apologizes to Thor, who turns out to share Nigel's love of watching ants.
20	2	"Alberta's Podcast"	Trent O'Donnell	Talia Bernstein	October 6, 2022	GHO202	6.21
A murder mystery podcast inspires Sam to develop her own based on Alberta's turbulent life. To gather more information, she invites Alberta's obsessive fan Todd back to the mansion despite Jay and the ghosts' warnings, and he comes across Alberta's secret diary. This prompts the singer to open up about being discriminated against because of her size; to this end, she ratted out Clara Brown, a rival singer, for bootlegging alcohol so she could earn a gig on stage. Sasappis recognizes Clara's name and recalls how she was present in the mansion at one time, making her a suspect for Alberta's murder and bringing more excitement and intrigue to the podcast. Meanwhile, Flower shows Hetty how to use the mansion's broken washing machine as a sexual stimulant.
21	3	"Jay's Friends"	Trent O'Donnell	Guy Endore-Kaiser	October 13, 2022	GHO204	6.54
A small cult claiming to be a business group visits the manor, and their charismatic leader Micah deceives Jay into joining them, delighting Flower but concerning Sam and the other ghosts. While Sam gradually convinces Jay of the truth, Flower opens up to Alberta about how she chose to join a hippie commune instead of supporting her brother Rob, who went M.I.A. during his service in the Vietnam War. The cultists refuse to leave when asked because, as Jay realizes, the contract he had signed gave them permission to stay on the land indefinitely. At Flower's suggestion, Sam lies about being intimate with Micah to stir up a conflict and drive them out of the mansion. Meanwhile, Sasappis, tired of rooming with Pete, asks the scout leader to be less overly cheerful, and he feigns adopting a more dour and cynical personality. During a sunset, Pete tells Sass that his optimistic attitude regarding eternity comes from cherishing special moments that happen along the way, which he points out when Sam shows Flower that she wrote an email as a pretend commune member to Rob, who is still alive and wrote back a heartwarming message about his sister.
22	4	"The Tree"	Trent O'Donnell	Josh Malmuth	October 20, 2022	GHO203	6.08
Sam and Jay's new neighbors, June and Ally, want to cut down an old tree. Sasappis has Sam tell the neighbors that the tree has a special significance to the Lenape people who lived on the land, noting the thirteen marks on the tree that he claims represent the Lenape language's dialects. Sam writes an op-ed in the local paper to get people's attention, but Sass confesses to the other ghosts that the thirteen marks are for every time Shiki said hello to him. As protesters arrive at the tree, Bob, who represents the Hudson Valley Lenape Culture Center, arrives and tells Sam that she is incorrect about her Lenape information, so Sass tells her the truth. The tree is cut down, and June and Ally give Sam seeds from the old tree to grow new ones. Meanwhile, acting on Trevor's advice, Thorfinn tries to get closer to Flower by learning about environmental issues, which interest her, but becomes overly concerned with protecting the environment. Flower tells him to use what he has learned to inspire rather than harass people.
23	5	"Halloween 2: The Ghost of Hetty's Past"	Katie Locke O'Brien	Kira Kalush	October 27, 2022	GHO205	6.78
Jay hosts a last minute Halloween party after the Arondekars' new neighbors, June and Ally, say they want to go to Liam Neeson's party. To liven up their dull party, the ghosts tell Sam to do a séance with their guests. They bring back Molly, Hetty's Irish-born maid and her husband's mistress, from the afterlife. While the guests leave, Sam tricks Hetty and Molly into entering the ghostproof vault so they can resolve their old tensions. One man passes through Isaac and smells him, but Isaac tells Nigel that Pete is the source of the stench. Flower forgets Sam is in there and shuts the door, trapping her. Realizing a feather duster that Ally borrowed for her maid costume is the key ingredient that brought back Molly, Jay hurries to Liam Neeson's house and retrieves the duster. Back in the manor, Jay fogs up a mirror so Trevor can write where Sam is but misinterprets Trevor's incomplete message. Isaac reluctantly passes through Jay, using his stench as a signal to read the full message so Jay can rescue Sam, and Nigel appreciates his honesty. Having made peace with Hetty, Molly returns to the afterlife through a reverse séance.
24	6	"The Baby Bjorn"	Katie Locke O'Brien	Joe Port & Joe Wiseman	November 3, 2022	GHO206	6.15
Sam discovers Thorfinn has a son named Bjorn, who has not seen his father since he was a young child, came to North America to find him in adulthood, and ended up haunting the Farnsbys' house. Because the Arondekars and the Farnsbys are not next-door neighbors, Sam decides to have the Vikings shout to each other through the houses' windows to reconnect. While reading Sam's notes from her interview with Bjorn, Thor is enraged to discover his son married and had three children with a Danish woman. He plans to announce that he has disowned Bjorn during their conversation but has a change of heart when he hears Bjorn call him "Father", something he was too young to do when they last saw each other. Meanwhile, Trevor schemes to outcompete Hetty, who has amassed an impressive afterlife "wealth" in back rub time, by using TV time as a new currency. Hetty convinces him to share his TV time, although he discovers that this was a trick so she could watch her favorite show: Bodices and Barons.
25	7	"Dumb Deaths"	Nick Wong	Sophia Lear	November 10, 2022	GHO207	6.61
Paula, a producer behind the documentary TV series Dumb Deaths, wants to make a short film about Flower's death, although Flower is reluctant to having her image used in an unflattering light to raise money for the B&B. A chat between Sam and Paula leads the latter to prepare for a short film about Pete's death instead, but Pete does not want to be remembered as a failed scout leader. Sam and Jay reach out to Jennifer, a now-grown former member of Pete's troop, so she can provide a positive eye witness case for him. The ghosts plot to sabotage the production, and after Thorfinn runs out of energy from draining a camera battery, a production crew member gets high from passing through Flower, then shoots an arrow into Jay's rear. Jennifer follows safety precautions needed to remove the arrow that she learned from Pete, reminding him that he was a good leader after all. Meanwhile, Sam's interview with Isaac and Nigel about the American Revolution causes their old sentiments from the war to resurface, but she resolves their tensions by reminding Isaac of the U.S. and Britain's much friendlier present-day relations. At the end of the day, the ghosts gather to watch Sam portray Flower in a televised Dumb Deaths episode. Executive Producer Mathew Baynton, one of the co-creators, writers and cast members of the original UK version, guest stars as Pete's actor.
26	8	"The Liquor License"	Nick Wong	Zora Bikangaga	December 8, 2022	GHO208	6.35
Jay admits to Sam that he neglected to apply for a liquor license when the B&B is about to host a whiskey tasting event. Since they have been selling alcohol illegally, Alberta encourages them to keep up the ruse for one more day despite Pete's objections. The liquor license inspector unexpectedly arrives during the whiskey tasting, so the Arondekars keep her from discovering the liquor by sending their guests into the vault for a "speakeasy" experience. When Alberta recalls a stash of Prohibition-era whiskey hidden in a wall, Sam and Jay try to convince the inspector to move to a room where she won't hear the wall being hammered open, but she sets up her final review work in the kitchen next to the whiskey wall. Jay tenderizes some meat loudly to drown out Sam breaking open the wall, and their party is a success, although they realize too late that selling the whiskey instead could have made them more money. Meanwhile, Isaac, who claims to have been in the Freemasons, wants to start his own intellectual fraternity for the ghosts, who all end up joining Trevor's fraternity because of the fun he promises. Trevor has a change of heart and invites Isaac, who was never really a Mason, to join the speakeasy party in the vault. In the whiskey hole, Sam discovers a letter adding two more suspects to Alberta's murder mystery.
27	9	"The Christmas Spirit"	Jay Karas	Emily Schmidt	December 15, 2022	GHO209	7.00
28	10	"The Christmas Spirit"	Jay Karas	Joe Port & Joe Wiseman	December 15, 2022	GHO210	7.00
Part 1: When Jay's sister Bela and her friend Eric visit the manor on Christmas Eve, Sam is inspired by her love of made-for-TV Christmas movies to bring them together romantically. Trevor, previously Bela's "boyfriend", hatches a plan to possess Eric so he can be intimate with her for one night, and Bela agrees to his text invitation. After learning from Jay about how he was possessed by Hetty, Bela convinces Eric, who is genuinely interested in her, to go forward with the plan as well. That night, Jay catches Bela and Eric attempting to recreate the circumstances that led to Jay's possession and orders them to stop. Meanwhile, Isaac attempts to kiss Nigel for the first time under some mistletoe, but his nerves cause Nigel to leave for the shed. On Christmas Morning, Sam converses with Thorfinn, who despises Christmas for appropriating elements from Norse traditions, as she attempts to fix the sconce that caused Hetty's possession, gets shocked, and falls onto Thor, making him possess her. Part 2: A heartbroken Eric leaves for the nearby train station, so Jay sets out to bring him back. At the station, they eventually agree to allow Trevor to possess Eric. While everyone waits for Jay's return, Thor, now in full control of Sam's body, opens his Christmas present: a decorative Viking ship model in a bottle, and he has a change of heart about the holiday. Jay returns with Eric, who attempts to shock himself on the sconce but fatally electrocutes himself and becomes a ghost. Thor revives Eric using his powers as a defibrillator, exposing himself as Sam's possessor, so Jay drives Sam over the ghost barrier, freeing the Viking. The livings and ghosts celebrate Christmas in full the next day. Elsewhere, Isaac has a nightmare about his wife Beatrice calling him a "big gay liar". In telling this to his friends, he shows a cricket Beatrice embroidered for him, making Sasappis remember how Beatrice visited Isaac on his deathbed. Realizing his wife wanted him to be happy, Isaac gains the confidence to kiss Nigel. After the Christmas celebrations, Trevor and Hetty secretly start their own relationship.
29	11	"The Perfect Assistant"	Matthew Cherry	Lauren Bridges	January 5, 2023	GHO211	6.55
Sam and Jay hire Freddie, a food deliveryman, as their new assistant. The ghosts, who are concerned about the attention Sam is giving Freddie, discover that Jessica, a woman in Freddie's car, is a permanently drunk ghost who died in an accident that left her bound to a small area around the vehicle. Jessica lies and states that Freddie is a hit-and-run driver responsible for her death, leading the Arondekars to fire him over a cover story. However, she soon confides to the ghosts that she actually died upon crashing into a telephone pole, and that Freddie bought the car at a sale a few years later, but she does not want to give up life on the road. The ghosts break the news to Sam and Jay, who purchase copious burritos for online delivery until Freddie returns so they can hire him back. Elsewhere, Bjorn seeks counsel from Thorfinn when Judy, the ghost of Henry Farnsby's mother, bullies him. Though Thor wants his son to bully her back, Pete, who had a distant and strict father, tells Bjorn to use his words instead. Bjorn then learns Judy has a crush on him, and they start a relationship.
30	12	"The Family Business"	Nick Wong	Zora Bikangaga	January 12, 2023	GHO212	6.47
Hetty is taken aback when Sam treats Freddie with respect for his strong performance as an employee, insisting she treat him as harshly as Hetty treated her servants in life. Together, Trevor and Hetty secretly tamper with guest booking information at the front desk computer in the night, causing mass confusion the next morning. Sam takes out her frustration on Freddie, who promptly quits. Upon reviewing the incorrect data and learning that no livings were awake at the time, Sam and Jay deduce that the ghosts were responsible and are forced to beg Freddie to return. Hetty opens up about how she couldn't give her children guidance after her death and now wants to be a positive mentor for Sam despite her outdated methods. As Freddie checks the security footage from the previous night, he notices the keyboard keys moving by themselves. Meanwhile, Sasappis begins a relationship with Jessica the car ghost but grows jealous when she describes her encounters with charismatic ghosts during her time on the road. Acting on relationship advice from Pete, he confirms that she has not been cheating on him with any other ghost.
31	13	"Ghost Hunter"	Alex Hardcastle	Rishi Chitkara	February 2, 2023	GHO213	6.91
Following his discovery of the front desk computer's keys moving seemingly on their own, Freddie purchases ghost-hunting equipment, including a ghost trap from Latvia. The ghosts are skeptical that the trap works, dismissing it as a children's toy, but when a worried Pete refuses to test it, Thorfinn, wanting to show his bravery, gets sucked inside. Flower soon naively follows suit. Freddie calls the company that sent him the trap, and Sam presses a button that causes the device to prepare to eviscerate the ghosts from existence. As the group realizes the label on the device means it can only hold a maximum of two ghosts, Pete willingly risks his afterlife existence and allows the device to trap him, malfunction, and free all three of its captives. Due to their heartfelt conversation in the trap, Flower decides she wants to date only Thor, and he warmly agrees. Freddie, fed up with the chaos in the mansion, quits for good after hearing Alberta's humming again. Meanwhile, Sass convinces Jay via Sam to buy back Freddie's recently sold car with Jessica, but they break up as they come to grips with neither being able to participate in each other's afterlife activities.
32	14	"Trevor's Body"	Alex Hardcastle	Ian Murphy	February 9, 2023	GHO214	6.98
Trevor's skull is discovered in a lake when Jay is taking a visiting couple out to fish for their supper. The discovery of Trevor's remains brings his parents, Lenny and Esther Lefkowitz, to Woodstone Manor. Trevor is distressed to find out his parents are now divorced, so he hatches a plan to "Parent Trap" his parents and reestablish their marriage via making the Arondekars hold a memorial for himself. Despite a romantic meal, plus a special song and film, Lenny takes a work phone call, causing Esther to leave. Meanwhile, Isaac's relationship with Nigel hits a roadblock when he learns Nigel had an affair with his subordinate Jenkins. Seeking a rebound, he learns from Thorfinn about George: a Puritan ghost on the Farnsby property who is now open about his repressed homosexuality due to failing to reach the afterlife. Discovering George is far too forward about his sexual tastes, Isaac invites Nigel to move into the mansion, albeit in another room, and Nigel chooses the library.
33	15	"A Date to Remember"	Richie Keen	John Blickstead & Trey Kollmer	February 16, 2023	GHO215	6.53
Sam and Jay put their Valentine's Day plans on hold to make Thorfinn's first date with Flower perfect. The next day, Flower does not appear to remember the previous night, so Thor requests to have the same night recreated exactly. When Flower helps Sam remember something she said before, she admits that she only pretended to forget the date because she is afraid her relationship with Thor will not last forever; her last two-person relationship in life ended when her then-boyfriend Michael died. Thor assures her that, as long as neither can die, they can stay together. Elsewhere, Nigel moves into the library but does not invite Hetty to his welcoming party, so Hetty, who used to be closer with Isaac before he started dating Nigel, seeks revenge by starting her own party. They seemingly apologize while Isaac is listening, although they secretly tell each other that their conflict over him will continue. The Arondekars ultimately have their romantic dinner six days after Valentine's Day.
34	16	"Isaac's Book"	Richie Keen	Josh Malmuth	March 2, 2023	GHO216	6.46
With Isaac watching, Sam tries to pitch his autobiography to a publisher. The publisher later passes, but Sam lies to Isaac to make him happy, even posting on Facebook about the book being accepted by a fictitious publisher. An old friend of Sam's from journalism school arrives for a stay at the mansion, forcing Sam to keep up the lie. Just as Sam's friend is about to contact the book's fictitious publisher, Sam admits the truth in front of Isaac, to whom she explains that being loved and remembered by friends is more important than being remembered by history. The real publisher, having read Sam's posts and thinking another publisher accepted, makes Sam an offer for the book. Meanwhile, Flower tells Thorfinn she can't continue dating him unless he does something about his anger issues, so the Viking asks Pete to become more mild mannered. When Sam's friend's husband, a native of Copenhagen, begins speaking harshly of Norway, Thor loses his patience. Flower apologizes, admitting that she likes Thor for who he is and should not force him to change. In the basement, Nancy gives Nigel a tour and walks in on Trevor and Hetty in bed.
35	17	"Weekend from Hell"	Trent O'Donnell	Sophia Lear	March 9, 2023	GHO217	6.62
Hetty's husband Elias returns from Hell for a 48-hour furlough and tries to get her to sign a document of forgiveness that will release him from Hell's torture. Hetty refuses until Elias tricks Pete into selling his soul, but she cannot write on the document because her forgiveness isn't genuine. Hearing Alberta's words about letting go of past toxic relationships, Hetty forgives Elias and signs the document, freeing both him and Pete. Elias is allowed to stay unless he misbehaves, in which case Thorfinn will throw him back into the ghost-proof vault. Meanwhile, Jay walks through Flower and cooks a chicken dish that inspires a guest to invite the Menu Hunter, a TV food critic with whom she has ties. Unable to remember the recipe, Jay tries walking through Flower repeatedly without success but goes forward with a newly improvised lamb chop recipe. Elias, deciding he cannot control himself, states he will voluntarily return to Hell and passes through the Menu Hunter, who ecstatically enjoys the lamb chops. When the portal to Hell reopens, Elias almost drags Pete down with him, but Pete escapes using self-defense techniques he learned from Thor.
36	18	"Alberta's Descendant"	Trent O'Donnell	Guy Endore-Kaiser	March 30, 2023	GHO218	6.31
Alicia, a lawyer and a descendant of Alberta's younger sister Theresa, books a stay at the mansion to participate in Sam's podcast. She is particularly interested in meeting Todd, who cohosts the show, and when he arrives, they start forming a relationship, much to Alberta's horror. With the ghosts' encouragement, Sam breaks up the couple during their dinner by divulging all of Todd's embarrassing secrets about his obsession with Alberta. Despite this, Alicia is inspired by her conversation with Todd to pursue singing and demonstrate her voice on the podcast to get some exposure. Although Alberta notes that music is a difficult career to pursue, she enjoys her descendant's voice and sings a duet with her. Meanwhile, Nigel uses his knowledge of Trevor and Hetty's affair as blackmail. Trevor, realizing his selfishness, breaks up with Hetty, and they finally recount their story to the other ghosts. During an episode of the podcast, new clues suggest that Theresa may have been Alberta's killer.
37	19	"Ghost Father of the Bride"	Jay Karas	Julia Harter & Liz Alexander	April 13, 2023	GHO219	6.26
Pete wants to be part of his daughter Laura's upcoming wedding. Sam and Jay file a anonymous complaint to close an unlicensed deck that Pete built, so Laura, her mother Carol, and her son Little Pete arrive at the mansion, but Pete disagrees with all of Laura's wedding ideas, including her refusal to include lilies. This leaves Pete heartbroken as he remembers "marrying" Laura to a stuffed bear when she was a child and giving her a bouquet of lilies. Sam attempts to include a passage about lilies in Pete's old diary, but Little Pete, who has memorized it, quickly discovers the truth. As the Martinos leave, Sam uses a slang word that Laura remembers only her father using, and she recalls him giving her a bouquet of orchids. The scoutmaster "walks" his daughter down the aisle on her wedding day. Meanwhile, the ghosts recover Crash's head, which was thrown into the property's forest a year ago. Isaac and Alberta interrogate each of the ghosts until Flower confesses that she discarded the head. Alberta then notices a key detail in Isaac's story that only he would have known, and he admits he threw away the head to create a mystery to solve, but because she enjoyed the experience, they agree to start another mystery soon. That evening, Crash irritates Flower with a doo-wop-type love song, and she tosses his head out the window.
38	20	"Woodstone's Hottest Couple"	Jay Karas	Kira Kalush	April 27, 2023	GHO220	6.35
In New York City, Jay reapplies for a position at his old restaurant and buys an expensive pair of sneakers, hiding both from Sam. While hiding the shoebox in the attic, he accidentally awakens Stephanie the prom ghost, who has long had a crush on Trevor and is furious when she learns of his relationship with Hetty, plotting to break up all the couples at Woodstone Manor. This includes trying to show Thor and Flower that they have nothing in common and leading Sam to the shoebox, and when Sam asks Jay about it, he lets slip about the application and they get into an argument. However, Nancy gives away Stephanie's plan. Sam soon understands Stephanie is lonely and sets her up with Ralph, a teenage cholera victim. Thor and Flower realize that they both love owls and think this is proof that they are meant for each other. Discovering during tea with Isaac and Nigel that having their relationship out in the open isn't working out, Trevor and Hetty stage a fake breakup to start over in secret.
39	21	"Whodunnit"	Christine Gernon	Joe Port & Joe Wiseman	May 4, 2023	GHO221	6.40
Sam's new podcast editor tells her that she has to post the solution to Alberta's murder within 24 hours. With help from the ghosts, she and Jay arrange a murder board, and much to Alberta's dismay, all the evidence keeps pointing back to her younger sister Theresa, making her feel betrayed. However, Hetty admits the love note to Alberta's boyfriend Earl signed "T" was not from Theresa, but Thomas Woodstone, Hetty's son. Thomas and Earl were secretly lovers, and when Earl broke it off, Thomas killed Alberta out of jealousy, using poisoned whiskey Theresa took from Al Capone while he was attempting suicide. Alberta is furious to learn Hetty saw what Thomas did and thus knew the truth all along, so she refuses to forgive her for keeping this a secret. Meanwhile, Trevor and Flower make Pete an email account so he can read daily jokes from Reader's Digest (despite Sam banning Trevor from using the computer following the Christmas incident), and the three end up falling victim to a Nigerian prince scam by wiring money from Jay's bank account. Sam stops the wire transfer upon receiving a fraud alert.
40	22	"The Heir"	Christine Gernon	Talia Bernstein	May 11, 2023	GHO222	6.51
Kelsey, a guest claiming to be the daughter of David Woodstone, Sam's uncle and Trevor's former coworker, states she is the rightful heiress. Trevor counters that this is impossible because David was banned from a strip club where he met Kelsey's mother, an exotic dancer. At the club, Sam and Jay encounter David's ghost, who explains that he had been sterile since before he met Kelsey's mother. Using this information, the couple gets Kelsey and her lawyer to admit that they had plotted to buy and resell the mansion at an immensely high profit to pay off gambling debts. Elsewhere, the ghosts put Hetty on trial for concealing the truth that her son killed Alberta, and although she is sentenced to staying in the forest for a year, Alberta forgives her on the condition that she shares a room with Flower, to which Hetty agrees. Sam reluctantly gives half the profits from Isaac's book to him, which he plans to spend on a new one-person bed. Understanding that Nigel is worried about what this means for their relationship, Isaac proposes to him, and he happily accepts. That evening, as the Arondekars reflect on how the ghosts have enriched their lives, and vice versa, Sam notices a beam of light from the mansion's roof, indicating that one of the ghosts has moved on to the afterlife, but it is unclear which ghost.

=== Season 3 (2024) ===
No. overall	No. in season	Title	Directed by	Written by	Original release date	Prod. code	U.S. viewers (millions)
41	1	"The Owl"	Jay Karas	John Blickstead & Trey Kollmer	February 15, 2024	GHO301	7.05
Sam frantically checks the mansion to see which ghosts are still present and deduces that Flower has moved on to the afterlife. Thorfinn struggles to find closure, so Jay tries comforting him by explaining the Hinduist concept of reincarnation. Jay's plans to convert the barn on the property into a restaurant are stunted when he and Sam find an owl perched on the rafters, which Thor immediately believes is Flower reincarnated, as they fell in love over their affinity for owls. Hoping to reach a compromise, Sam keeps the owl caged in the main house, only for guests to find it too noisy. The Arondekars help Thor let go of the owl as they remind him of Flower's free spirit, and he agrees that "Flower" should be free. Following a memorial service for Flower, Jay releases the owl into the wild, only for it to turn back and attack him. At the same time, Pete tries to make up for unintentionally offending the cholera ghosts by inviting them to move upstairs. Cholera victim Nancy tells him she liked coming upstairs alone to get away from the other basement ghosts, so she pretends to hear another accidental insult from Pete, and the other cholera ghosts return to the basement out of spite.
42	2	"Man of Your Dreams"	Jay Karas	Joe Port & Joe Wiseman	February 22, 2024	GHO302	6.05
While Sam argues with Jay about where to put up a new TV so they can watch their favorite shows separately from the ghosts, Sasappis uses his secret power—entering living people's dreams to influence their thoughts—to convince Jay to buy a pizza oven for his planned restaurant. He admits this secret to Sam, who persuades him to manipulate Jay into setting up the TV where she wants it. Pete confronts Sass about the ethics of his actions, but Trevor persuades him to trick Jay into buying a Kathy Ireland poster for him. That night, Jay overhears Sass talking to Trevor, blowing his cover. Sass apologizes in the next dream and forms a new friendship with Jay. Elsewhere, Isaac informs Sam and the younger ghosts about Thorfinn's previous ghost girlfriends before Flower, both of whom moved on to the afterlife while dating him. Thinking they can move on as well, Hetty and Alberta try to form intimate relationships with the still somewhat depressed Thor, who rebuffs their advances when he learns of their intentions, explaining that Flower was his first girlfriend who genuinely listened to him. After the Arondekars agree not to put up their new TV after all, their preparations for Halloween give Trevor the idea to bring Flower back from the afterlife through a seance, restoring Thor's enthusiasm.
43	3	"He Sees Dead People"	Pete Chatmon	Talia Bernstein	February 29, 2024	GHO303	6.10
After Sam leaves for a trip to a bachelorette party, Bela visits and catches up on the ghosts' activities with Jay, then claims Eric can now see ghosts following his temporarily being one at Christmas. However, Eric makes several inaccurate statements about which ghosts are in the same room and what they are saying or doing. Jay fears that revealing the truth will end their relationship, while Eric confides that he lied to bring some new life into the romance. Sam returns due to a flight cancellation and learns this as well. Eric plans to pretend to lose his "power" by purposely falling down the stairs but blows his cover when he lies about passing through Flower first despite Jay informing Bela that Flower has moved on. The Arondekars persuade Bela to give him one more chance, as they are a good match. Meanwhile, Hetty brings Isaac and Nigel together to discuss financial arrangements for their wedding in light of the book money Sam has allowed Isaac to spend as he decides. The possibility of a prenup causes the soldiers to argue over the future of their relationship and if it will last, so Hetty opens up about how she broke up with an artist in her youth to avoid having her father cut her off from the family fortune, wanting the men to marry for love instead of money.
44	4	"Halloween 3: The Guest Who Wouldn't Leave"	Pete Chatmon	Josh Malmuth	March 7, 2024	GHO304	5.64
The Arondekars are welcoming guests to their Halloween party when Pete's widow Carol arrives, as they accidentally sent an invitation to her instead of their bookstore friend Caroline. While alone in the kitchen, Carol, hoping to cheat on her diet, dies from choking on one of the doughnut holes she brought, unknowingly becoming a ghost. During the party, Sam talks to Carol in front of her successful friends Sasha and Nico, unaware that she has died. Confused, Sasha and Nico find Carol's body in the kitchen and suspect Sam and Jay have killed her, especially when Jay returns from digging where Flower died to find a focus object for Thorfinn's planned seance to bring her back from the afterlife. The ghosts try to tell Sam the truth, but she refuses to speak to them to avoid looking strange in front of the party guests. She and Jay try to stop Nico and Sasha from leaving when Carol talks to Sam about her hand passing through a chair and sees Pete, making the Arondekars and ghosts scream as their friends flee the mansion. Using a ring Flower wore when she died, Sam, Jay, and the ghosts try to bring her back to no avail. Flower is then shown to be still on Earth, having fallen down a well in the forest a month earlier, and hears Thor shouting her name in the distance. Note: Sheila Carrasco has an uncredited voiceover as Flower
45	5	"The Silent Partner"	Trent O'Donnell	Kira Kalush	March 14, 2024	GHO305	5.51
The Arondekars plan to borrow the $10,000 from Isaac's book, which Jay hasn't yet read, to invest in Jay's barn restaurant. Though Isaac reluctantly concedes, Trevor sets up a brokerage account and invests the money in stocks, which multiplies the total to $187,000, inspiring Isaac to try to keep the money. Sam encourages Jay to let Isaac share ownership in the restaurant, though Jay disagrees with all of the Revolutionary's suggestions, leaving him offended. That night, Jay decides to read the book and is inspired to go through with naming the restaurant in Isaac's honor, demonstrating accurate knowledge of his life in paying an admiring tribute to him. Meanwhile, the recently deceased Carol, unaware that Pete knows of her affair with Jerry, assumes Pete must have a girlfriend when he and the other ghosts explain their dating history. In a panic, Pete says he has one, leading Alberta and Nancy to separately pretend to be his girlfriend. When Pete tells Carol that Nancy is his "mistress," she tries to advise him on how to successfully have an affair, although his conscience leads him to confront Carol about her unfaithfulness. Soon after, Pete apologizes to Alberta for dragging her into his ruse, but as he removes his arrow from his neck, she realizes she indeed has romantic feelings for him.
46	6	"Hello, Brother"	Trent O'Donnell	Guy Endore-Kaiser	April 4, 2024	GHO306	5.86
Trevor's brother Jeremy visits the manor, having been fired from their father's business. Though he claims to be worse off financially, he starts buying the most expensive items available to guests. He then reveals he has exploited a loophole in the Woodstone guest rewards program and amassed over one million reward points using 10,000 fake email addresses, allowing him to stay at the mansion for free for a year. Jay challenges him to Super Mega Bowl, a football video game that the Lefkowitz brothers played growing up. Despite losing to Trevor throughout his childhood, Jeremy is now a world record holder, so Hetty, via Sam, tries to help Jay cheat. Trevor catches Sam in the act, leaving Jay alone against his competitor. Jeremy admits he actually quit his father's business because he didn't want to take it over. Just before Jeremy can score a winning goal, Trevor gives him a wet willy in his ear, costing him the game but motivating him to act more maturely and leave to start a new venture. At the same time, Carol charms Pete into rekindling their intimate relationship. When she later flirts with Thorfinn, he agrees to Sassapis's plan to subject Carol to a loyalty test and ends up sleeping with Carol. Infuriated to learn this, Pete punches Thor, who ultimately congratulates him for using violence to solve a problem. Also, Isaac becomes intensely fascinated to learn about dinosaurs for the first time.
47	7	"The Polterguest"	Jude Weng	Akilah Green	April 11, 2024	GHO307	6.08
A Negro league baseball player ghost named Saul arrives at the mansion alongside new guest Gene. He explains that he is a poltergeist and has the power to travel anywhere by forcibly binding himself to small perimeters around different human hosts, then demonstrates by binding himself to Jay so he can start a relationship with Alberta. This frustrates the Arondekars as they now know the two are having an intimate relationship in close proximity. Alberta begins having second thoughts when Saul states his plan to continue to become attached to new human hosts as long as he remains on earth so he can continue their relationship. They part on amicable terms when Saul admits his clingy nature and returns to having Gene as his host. Meanwhile, the main male ghosts except Isaac throw a bachelor party for Nigel, whose subordinate and ex-lover Jenkins performs a lap dance. When Isaac finds out, Nigel claims it was "in good fun" and suggests his fiancé have a lap dance of his own. Sam hires Chris, an Australian male stripper, and tells him to perform before what he sees as an empty chair, though Isaac is so aroused by both the stripper's performance and his knowledge of dinosaurs that he cannot concentrate on his conversation with Nigel the next morning.
48	8	"Holes Are Bad"	Jude Weng	Sophia Lear	April 18, 2024	GHO308	6.20
While Sam and Jay are out of town for the weekend, Stephanie comes down from the attic and bemoans how Ralph, her cholera victim boyfriend, moved on to the afterlife several months earlier. While the other ghosts realize that Flower may not have moved on but is lost somewhere, Thorfinn claims to have communicated with her from beyond and heard her saying she is "well" whenever he walks in the forest. The other ghosts correctly conclude that Flower is still on earth and stuck down the well in the woods, where they find her unable to climb out due to her phasing through the walls into the dirt. Sasappis and Isaac recall a time they, Thor, and Puritan ghost named Patience were stuck in a hole but navigated their way through dirt back to the manor's basement. Along the way, Isaac, who was holding Patience's hand, sneezed and let her go, leaving her to an unknown fate. Mark prepares to fill the well with cement, so Trevor, unable to open a drawer to access Sam's tablet, uses Mark's phone to contact the Arondekars, though they can't see any of the ghosts over video chat. Hetty reluctantly reveals she strangled herself using an early telephone cord to avoid trouble with the law for her husband's crimes and to protect her son. She uses this cord, now part of her ghost being, to rescue Flower, who joyfully reunites with Thor as the Arondekars arrive home.
49	9	"The Traveling Agent"	Christine Gernon	Skander Halim & Emily Schmidt	April 25, 2024	GHO309	6.07
Pete is discussing Isaac and Nigel's honeymoon when he runs away from a bee over the property line. He realizes he can go anywhere but is reluctant to leave the property until the Arondekars encourage him to go on errands with Jay. He is soon distracted by the selection of razors in the superstore Jay takes him to and gets lost, encountering a ghost couple that was trampled to death in a 2005 Black Friday sale. After the store closes for the night, a violent gang of ghosts, whose leader was a butcher killed by a meat cleaver in his head, chases Pete out. Using some key locations from the Hudson Valley he once knew that still exist as well as the stars, he finds his way back home. Concluding that his power is the result of never being able to travel as much as the clients he served did, Pete accepts Sam and Jay's offer to be sent on a vacation to St. Lucia so he can spend time with his family. Meanwhile, Thorfinn struggles to admit to Flower that he had an affair with Nancy while the hippie was stuck in the well. Flower is taken aback when he tells her the truth, but she and Nancy eventually agree to a polyamorous relationship with him. As they celebrate, Thor reveals he also slept with Carol, and Nancy remarks that she did the same.
50	10	"Isaac's Wedding"	Christine Gernon	Lauren Bridges & John Timothy	May 2, 2024	GHO310	5.95
Isaac has an erotic dream about Chris. Sasappis assures him that this was only induced by pre-wedding anxiety, but when Jay hires a DJ for the wedding reception, Chris arrives. He also mentions having a boyfriend and disliking Alexander Hamilton, making Isaac only more attracted. The captain becomes excited by the possibility of Chris dying from an allergic reaction to Jay's crab recipe, but is later disappointed to hear he was rushed to the hospital and will survive. Although Nigel is upset by his reaction, they talk things through. When Nancy learns that the basement ghosts have been excluded from the wedding, Thorfinn and Flower join her in the basement out of sympathy. The two then agree to attend the wedding in Nancy's honor. In St. Lucia, Pete sleeps with Donna, a ghost who died in 1982 when an early cell phone fell on her head. He ends the affair when he starts disappearing in pieces due to being away from Woodstone for too long. Returning to Woodstone and interrupting the wedding, the restored Pete gives a speech that causes Isaac to change his mind. Though he and Nigel break up on largely unfriendly terms, Sam and the other ghosts encourage Isaac to maintain hope for the future. Thor declares he only wants to date Flower, but they agree not to marry right away out of respect for Isaac. Carol then announces she is about to marry Nigel's subordinate Baxter. Nancy invites Isaac to the basement for a "present", and a vengeful Patience, the ghost he lost in the dirt, drags him through the wall.

=== Season 4 (2024–25) ===
No. overall	No. in season	Title	Directed by	Written by	Original release date	Prod. code	U.S. viewers (millions)
51	1	"Patience"	Richie Keen	Trey Kollmer	October 17, 2024	GHO401	5.57
The Arondekars ask the other ghosts about where the absent Isaac was last seen until a suspiciously nervous Nancy admits she witnessed Patience the Puritan ghost dragging him through the basement wall into the soil, having been alerted by the loud bass from Isaac's wedding music. While Patience holds him hostage, Isaac mentions missing his friends, prompting Patience to briefly reenter the basement and abduct Sasappis. Sam and Jay then begin looking for where to dig to rescue their friends using clues from Flower, which turn out to be 1960s song lyrics. Sass and Isaac reminisce about their time underground and make fun of Patience's tendency to shout her own name as a sign of her instability, so Patience, feeling unloved, returns them both to the basement. Sam convinces the ghosts to show Patience how much they care. Trevor, who has been struggling with self-image issues due to Thorfinn's teasing, directs both the upstairs and basement ghosts to form a chain leading to Patience's hiding spot under the mansion's fountain, and Isaac, who had made a promise to become a better person, persuades Patience to join them. Patience spends that night in Alberta's room, making Alberta panic.
52	2	"Sam's Dad"	Richie Keen	Josh Malmuth	October 24, 2024	GHO402	5.55
Sam's father Frank, who was absent for most of her life after her parents divorced, arrives at the manor with his new girlfriend Diane. Enraged that the two of them share a bed despite not being married, Patience causes a wall to bleed. To keep her happy and prevent Frank and Diane from learning of the ghosts, the Arondekars try to separate the pair into two bedrooms for an "authentic" luxury experience, but when Frank sneaks out at night to sleep with Diane, Patience makes their shared bedroom wall bleed the word "Sin". Sam convinces Frank it was a prank and calls him out for his absence, and he and Diane start to leave, but Sam convinces them to stay by explaining she wants to be closer to her father; in response, the main ghosts tell Patience that Frank and Diane were instantly married in their car. The livings and ghosts gather to listen to Sam playing a recorder like she did in the 5th grade at a recital Frank missed. Meanwhile, Thorfinn and Flower agree to help Isaac persuade Nigel to move back to the shed in return for Isaac informing Nancy that the couple no longer considers her their third partner. Seeing Nigel in a dour mood, however, Flower and Thor allow him to stay. When Isaac finally musters the courage to tell Nigel to leave, Nigel reflects on how he now thinks of the mansion ghosts as family, so Isaac agrees to move to the shed instead. That night, Nigel decides they should switch places again, as Isaac had annoyed the other shed ghosts with a rant about becoming a better person.
53	3	"Halloween 4: The Witch"	Katie Locke O'Brien	Joe Port & Joe Wiseman	October 31, 2024	GHO403	5.82
To appease Patience, Jay cancels Halloween, to the disappointment of Sam and the other ghosts, and instead hosts a yard sale. Patience, convinced that Sam is a witch, places her on trial in absentia, and after most of the ghosts get revenge by voting that she is guilty of witchcraft, Patience declares that she will turn Sam to stone as punishment. At the yard sale, Jay sells a statue that strikingly resembles Sam, who was wearing one of Hetty's old dresses as a period costume; in response, Trevor texts Jay to go after Jamie, the man who bought the statue and hosts a Web video series where he detonates various items. At Jamie's house, which is haunted by a Vietnam veteran Pete befriends, Jay reluctantly trades in one of his favorite sci-fi collectibles for the Sam-like statue. Isaac introduces Patience to television, which she believes is sinful despite being entertained by it, and tactically threatens to use her enjoyment against her as blackmail in Sam's retrial. The ghosts almost agree to overturn their verdict as Flower hugs Jay in celebration; in his brief high, he accidentally decapitates the statue. The real Sam shows up alive, explaining that she found the statue among the multitude of artifacts in the ballroom. Later, Patience announces she is going back underground, hinting that there are other ghosts dwelling in the dirt.
54	4	"The Work Retreat"	Katie Locke O'Brien	Sophia Lear	November 7, 2024	GHO404	5.31
Trevor has been secretly working remotely in a job for three months under the pseudonym "Michael Jackson". When the company requires him to partake in a mandatory work retreat, he persuades his employer to host it at Woodstone, with Jay serving as his body double and Sam as Jay's secret dialogue coach. Though the retreat starts well, the other attendees notice how Jay behaves nothing like how Trevor did during his remote work, making Trevor feel as if he left no lasting legacy on the business world. His spirits are lifted when Jay calls Trevor his mentor, and the other attendees say they remember Trevor as a hero who helped his former coworker Pinkus, now the founder of the new firm who ended the hazing ritual that cost him his own pants. Trevor celebrates his legacy as he joins his coworkers and Jay in running through the backyard without pants; Isaac, who has undone his ponytail and adopted a carefree attitude to cope with his breakup, follows suit. Hetty and Sasappis start a rumor that Pete's Caribbean girlfriend Donna is imaginary. When word gets out, they apologize to Pete, who is still disappointed he has no way to prove that Donna is real. Sam learns from her research that Donna murdered her husband and fled to the Caribbean, leaving Pete horrified.
55	5	"A Star Is Dead"	Kabir Akhtar	Liz Alexander	November 14, 2024	GHO405	5.40
The Hudson Valley Players, a local acting troupe, rents out the manor's ballroom for a production of Anything Goes. Alberta encourages Sam to audition for the part of principal character Reno Sweeney, which she tried to audition for in high school before vomiting out of stage fright. She then subjects Sam to an intense training regimen for acting; despite initial struggles, Sam's performance improves until she successfully lands the audition. The performance goes well as Alberta dances and sings alongside Sam, who gets an inflated ego after the production. Meanwhile, Sasappis becomes smitten with Marisa, an actress in the troupe, and convinces Jay via Sam to fill his head with thoughts about her before going to sleep each night so he can talk to a manifestation of Marisa in Jay's subconscious. He soon ends his scheme as he realizes that this version of Marisa shares all of Jay's interests.
56	6	"The Primary Source"	Kabir Akhtar	Talia Bernstein	December 5, 2024	GHO406	5.44
Sharon, a local publisher, tells Sam she must find any primary sources to confirm if any of the information in Isaac's book is true. To protect Isaac's existence as a ghost from being discovered, she and Jay follow his instructions to find his lost journal, conveniently found beneath a cobblestone outside Fort Ticonderoga, but every entry in the journal is useless and related to food, especially sandwiches. Jay proposes a scheme to fill the blank pages with knowledge about Isaac's life, which the Revolutionary dramatically narrates, drawing the attention of both the upstairs and cholera ghosts. William, an assessor, arrives and puts on his smock for work, making Sam mistake him for a cholera ghost and admit her and Jay's scheme. Sam works out an agreement with the publisher whereby Isaac's book can still be published as a young adult vampire romance fiction and persuades Isaac to go forward with the plan. Several of the ghosts observe Jay stepping on a ghost snail and plan to take turns caring for it. When the snail goes missing, everyone assumes Thorfinn ate it until Trevor, who feigned indifference at first, admits he took it because he died while his dog Bucky was still alive and misses having a pet. After Trevor shows the snail The Cutting Edge, he has an emotional moment and appears to begin moving on to the afterlife, only to realize the snail is ascending very slowly instead.
57	7	"Sad Farnsby"	Heather Jack	Guy Endore-Kaiser	December 12, 2024	GHO407	5.53
Jay wants to open his restaurant in time for a visiting couple planning to get married at Woodstone in the spring but earns the wrath of Henry, who threatens to forcibly shut down his plans due to pipe damage caused by the construction. To get the Farnsbys off their case, Sam tries bonding with Margaret but causes her to kick Henry out of their house when she describes a book both ladies have read as being a metaphor for a failing relationship. A depressed Henry checks in at Woodstone and offers to form a band with Jay. After Henry turns against Jay when he and Margaret have an argument, Thorfinn learns from Bjorn that Henry forgot their anniversary, so the Arondekars lure them into having a romantic dinner to rekindle their marriage, only to discover that their "anniversary" was actually to celebrate the first time they had an orgy. Isaac receives a backordered children's dinosaur bed meant for him and Nigel to share after their wedding, and Nigel seeks to claim ownership, prompting Jay to move it to the shed. Nigel regifts the bed to Baxter and Carol. Isaac is taken aback but then impressed when Nigel criticizes the bed as anatomically inaccurate. Realizing Nigel learned about dinosaurs to be able to talk about them with him, Isaac agrees to remain friends. Sam later buys Isaac a dinosaur night light that changes colors at the press of a button.
58	8	"A Very Arondekar Christmas"	Richie Keen	Rupinder Gill	December 19, 2024	GHO408	4.90
59	9	"A Very Arondekar Christmas"	Richie Keen	Skander Halim	December 19, 2024	GHO409	4.90
Part 1: Jay's parents, Mahesh and Champa, and sister Bela are about to visit Woodstone for Christmas when the cholera ghosts inform Sam and Jay that the water heater is malfunctioning. Unable to get help from Mark, who is vacationing in Fiji with his family, the couple's attempt to fix the heater results in them both getting shocked; consequently, Nancy possesses Sam, while Pete possesses Jay. Sam struggles with Nancy for control over her body as Jay's family arrives, and to the ghosts' amazement, Champa makes a connection with Nancy's personality. Despite the struggle intensifying, Sam successfully drives over the property line, freeing Nancy but wrecking Jay's parents’ car. She and the ghosts attempt to perform an exorcism on Jay, only to expel Jay's soul, leaving Pete in full control of his body. Meanwhile, Thorfinn decides to be more open with Flower about his secrets and shares his knowledge that Sasappis died a virgin. Flower arranges for Carol to be Sass's first sexual experience, but Carol tells Sass she would rather not go through with the plan. Sass confronts Thor about having his trust broken. Part 2: While the disembodied Jay finally meets the ghosts face to face, Bela walks in on Sam and Pete, the latter possessing Jay's body. Pete drives the Arondekars out to the local DealMart for last-minute shopping but soon learns that his daughter Laura will be moving to Australia for a new job after the holiday. Fearing he would disappear before making it back to Woodstone from that long of a trip, Pete takes the car to Philadelphia spend one last Christmas with Laura and her son Little Pete. He stops at a gas station to use the restroom, allowing Sam to track him down. Back at the manor, Jay spies on his parents discussing their son's decision to pursue a risky career of running a restaurant instead of more stable work. Mahesh reflects on how they immigrated from India to America to make life better for their children. Moved by his father's words, Jay decides to let Sam and Pete visit Laura's house, where Pete, maintaining character as Jay, gives his daughter a snow globe per his classic tradition and tells her he is proud of her. They embrace, expelling Pete from Jay's body, which starts acting as a zombie with no soul in control. Returning home, Sam lures the body with a French fry to the sconce by the fireplace, shocking it and allowing Jay's soul to reenter. Jay reveals to his family that he named the restaurant in Mahesh's honor. At the same time, Sass talks to Flower about having his trust broken, but when he remembers becoming a ghost and meeting Thor for the first time, the two elder ghosts mend their friendship. Pete stays with his family on Christmas morning until he starts to disappear and promptly exits.
60	10	"The Not-So-Silent Partner"	Heather Jack	Emily Schmidt	January 30, 2025	GHO410	5.38
After Isaac turns down yet another tile sample for Jay's restaurant, Mark wants to speak to the restaurant's investor on the matter with the opening deadline approaching, unaware that the investor is Isaac. Against Jay's warning, Sam hires Kelsey, the con artist who previously feigned being her cousin, to play the part of the investor. She keeps trying to convince Kelsey to leave, but Kelsey becomes so absorbed by the false narrative she spins that she cons $15,000 off of Mark. To convince Mark to withdraw the check he gave Kelsey, Sam tries telling the truth but claims the Jay had no idea of the scam and that Mahesh was the investor. Isaac finally agrees to let the Arondekars have more of a voice in planning the restaurant. Meanwhile, Hetty asks Sam to investigate her ancestry, hoping to find out if she is descended from royalty, but she is horrified to learn she had an Irish grandmother named Mary Shaughnessy. Thorfinn, who observed Mary's arrival in America, explains to Hetty that he kept this a secret to comfort her, which evokes her warm memories of her ability to see him in her childhood. Pete and Trevor then teach Hetty more about Irish history and culture using the Internet.
61	11	"Thorapy 2: Abandonment Issues"	Rebecca Asher	Akilah Green	February 6, 2025	GHO411	5.47
Thorfinn starts acting more aggressively as the anniversary of his desertion in North America approaches. Following another therapy session where Sam translates for him, the livings and ghosts agree to send Pete to Norway and find a Viking ghost who can finally answer why Thor was left behind. As Pete travels, Thor learns from Bjorn that their tribe later moved to another village due to a cod shortage, so the Arondekars remotely configure a traffic control trailer sign to redirect Pete. In the right village, now a historic tourist site, the Viking ghost Gorm explains that Thor was left behind because one Viking was counted twice after removing his hat, and the crew decided it was too risky to go back and rescue Thor after they realized their mistake. Pete attempts to leave by ferry but struggles to find an alternate route home since ferry services are closed for Sámi National Day. Seeing Pete return half-faded, Thor's appreciation for his present-day friends and the sacrifices they make for him grows. Meanwhile, Jay's sister Bela returns to help him with the restaurant despite her failings in many previous jobs. As the ghosts observe her ordering a pound of expensive shrimp when Jay asked for 100, Trevor orders another hundred, unaware that Bela ordered 100 pounds of a cheaper but better-quality shrimp. Jay dismisses Bela until he learns the truth from Sam, after which he brings her back aboard as the interim manager.
62	12	"It's the End of the World as We Know It and What Were We Talking About?"	Rebecca Asher	Kira Kalush	February 13, 2025	GHO412	5.40
Jay's restaurant is set to open the night of February 13th as he hires three new staff members. Flower remembers her old cult leader Bruce saying this is the day that a meteorite would destroy the world at sundown and desperately tries to convince everyone that the opening needs to be cancelled. None of the livings nor the upstairs ghosts takes Flower seriously, so she goes to the basement ghosts. The basement ghosts use their power of walking through livings and giving them cholera symptoms for 24 hours to incapacitate Jay's new staff. The Arondekars are furious and explain that Bruce lied. Though Flower self-deprecates, the Arondekars and ghosts comfort her. Since the ghosts know Jay's recipes by heart, Flower has the idea for them to watch Sam, Bela and Mark and in the kitchen and relay instructions to Sam for the others. The opening night is a success. Meanwhile, Trevor and Hetty partake in a competition for the four seats at the restaurant's ghost table. They declare themselves "Power Friends" and work together on schemes. Two cholera ghosts sit at the table, frightening Hetty away.
63	13	"Ghostfellas"	Rose McIver	Brian Bahe	February 20, 2025	GHO413	5.61
Pete gives Jay an arrabbiata sauce recipe for the restaurant that immediately becomes popular. Carol's nephew Anthony visits, accusing Jay of stealing the family secret. Carol explains that Anthony is actually head of the local mafia, and Pete's travel agency was a front for the mob to launder the money while he never guessed the truth. Jay apologizes and takes the sauce off the menu, but the mob continues eating at the restaurant, taking valuables that they ask be added to their tab without paying. Carol warns Sam that they will eventually take over and burn down the restaurant, then flee with the insurance money. Apologizing to Pete, Carol tells Sam where to find decades of her mob accountant paperwork. The Arondekars make copies and threaten to notify the police should anything happen to them, forcing the mafia to leave, then show Pete hundreds of postcards from people he helped as a travel agent, reminding him of the differences he made in his clients' lives. Meanwhile, Hetty convinces Flower to move into Thorfinn and Trevor's room, and Trevor threatens to move into Hetty's room. Isaac and Alberta do not want this as Trevor and Hetty would likely get back together, creating drama. Isaac gives his room to Flower and Thorfinn while rooming with Alberta. As Hetty and Trevor celebrate getting individual rooms, Flower nearly figures out what happened but forgets before her conclusion.
64	14	"Alexander Hamilton and the Ruffle Kerfuffle"	Richie Keen	John Blickstead & Trey Kollmer	February 27, 2025	GHO414	5.41
When Jay expresses his frustrations over his struggle to compete with a rival restaurateur, Isaac tells the story of how his rivalry with Alexander Hamilton began. In a flashback to 1776, Isaac hopes to buy a neck ruffle to impress his mentor John Jay at a meeting to discuss the first draft of the Declaration of Independence. After a brief chat with Hamilton, who bought a ruffle himself, Isaac learns the ruffles at the shop are sold out and assumes Hamilton stole his from him. At the meeting, Jay reluctantly gives Isaac an embarrassing out-of-style ruffle. The meeting goes peacefully until Isaac gives into temptation and attempts to forcibly seize Hamilton's ruffle, knocking over a candle and setting the document on fire. As Hamilton escorts Isaac out, he quietly confirms his suspicions that he stole the ruffle. Back in the present, Pete consoles Isaac by explaining that the phrase "pursuit of happiness", which Isaac used when speaking to the Founding Fathers after the fight, became part of the final Declaration, leading the overjoyed Revolutionary to boast about being "famous". Elias arrives from Hell to announce that, due to his voluntary return to Hell in the second season, he has been promoted to a demon who administers torture and collects souls for the Devil. He almost tempts Thorfinn to sell his soul until his friends remind him of the good deeds he has done in the afterlife. Later, Elias, who can now also physically reincarnate, tries to entice Jay to sell his soul in exchange for improved business, but Jay decides to think it over.
65	15	"The Bachelorette Party"	Pete Chatmon	Akilah Green	March 6, 2025	GHO415	5.75
When Alberta’s descendant Alicia arrives to hold her bachelorette party at Woodstone, Alberta objects to her marrying Derek, a musician, since she once was engaged to a musician whom she claims abandoned her. Derek visits the day before the party, and the ghosts suspect he is having an affair with the maid of honor. Alberta orders Sass to enter Alicia’s dreams to inform her of Derek’s infidelity. The next day, the ghosts learn the maid of honor is actually Derek’s sister, and they were talking about a TV show. Alberta admits she abandoned her musician fiancé instead. Feeling her ancestor's presence, Alicia asks for a sign, and she hears Alberta humming a love song, confirming that Derek has been faithful. Sam researches Alberta’s former fiancé and learns he had a happy life with a loving family; although his wife was one of Alberta's rivals, she is happy for him. Meanwhile, Jay is ecstatic when a famous critic gives an extremely positive review on his restaurant, only to discover that Trevor bribed the critic in exchange for Jay covering for him at his work retreat. Jay is crestfallen and invites the critic back, asking him to give an honest review, in which the critic writes that he indeed liked the restaurant. Chris, the stripper from Isaac's bachelor party, attempts a parachuting stunt for Alicia's party, but his parachute fails, and he fatally crashes through the restaurant's roof, becoming a ghost.
66	16	"St. Hetty's Day"	Pete Chatmon	Josh Malmuth	March 13, 2025	GHO416	5.35
On St. Patrick's Day, in the aftermath of Chris falling to his death, Isaac is excited for the two of them to finally connect. However, he is too nervous during his attempted conversation. Nigel arrives and starts making a connection with Chris, to the humiliation of Isaac, who admits his romantic feelings and storms out. As Chris learns that he can leave the property by using his parachute to fly over the ghost boundaries, he reconciles with Isaac before leaving to watch a sports event in Australia. Isaac lies to Nigel by stating Chris has moved on to the afterlife, but Nigel still feels renewed hope for having known Chris at all. Meanwhile, when Jay's cousin Sunil visits, having recently broken up with his girlfriend, he notices Hetty and becomes attracted to her, unaware that she is a ghost. Hetty realizes she can be seen by the living and spends the day with Sunil; though she is unsure how frequently her power works, the ghosts conclude it has to do with her overcoming her anti-Irish sentiments and embracing that part of her heritage. Sunil attempts to kiss her, but she retreats, and he discovers she is a ghost when his hands pass through hers. Despite Sunil's fears, Hetty encourages him not to give up on finding romantic love. At midnight, Hetty confirms her suspicions that her power only works on St. Patrick's Day as she vanishes before Jay's eyes.
67	17	"His Girl Shiki"	Todd Biermann	Joe Port & Joe Wiseman	April 3, 2025	GHO417	5.21
To help Sassapis have his first sexual experience, Pete introduces him to Joan, another roaming ghost and one of the first female screenwriters from the Golden Age of Hollywood, who has enough experience roaming that she can leave her home haunting place without ill effect for at least a year. Reflecting on his habit of pursuing physically impossible romances, Sass asks Pete to confirm with Shiki if she has feelings for him. Although Shiki is not interested at first due to Sass's shyness, Pete reveals that, in life, Sass left the body of a deer he had hunted at the door of Shiki's house, making Shiki realize how much he wanted her. The ghosts trust Sam and Jay to keep this a secret in order to help Sass move on and pursue Joan, but Sam forgets to share this with Jay, who accidentally blurts out the secret while Sass is listening. Sass reconciles with Joan, who suggests "thinking outside the box", which in turn reminds him of the ghost trap Freddie brought to Woodstone two years prior and gives him the idea that it could help him leave the property and meet up with Shiki. Meanwhile, Thorfinn gets an idea from the Arondekars to "revenge-ditch" Alberta to get back at her for not attending his 1,000th birthday party 50 years earlier: he promises to attend a special performance of hers but deliberately does not attend, except for when he briefly checks up on the party to see Alberta's reaction. He tells Alberta the truth about his plan, who promises to spend time with him at the fountain to make up for lost time. Once Thor arrives, however, Jay informs him that Alberta chose not to join him in retaliation for his revenge-ditch.
68	18	"Smooching and Smushing"	Todd Biermann	Rupinder Gill & Sophia Lear	April 10, 2025	GHO418	5.13
To fix the ghost trap so Sasappis can use it to cross the ghost boundary, the Arondekars invite Janis, a Latvian ghost hunting expert, to Woodstone. Sass reconsiders his plan as Janis explains that attempting to bring a ghost in a trap over the barrier could result in that ghost being squashed into oblivion between the barrier and the trap walls. Joan, whose romantic feelings for Sass have become sincere, rehearses her confession with Pete, while Sass overhears them and concludes that Joan, in whom he has become interested, is seeing Pete instead. Heartbroken, Sass enters the upgraded trap, now able to hold up to 100 ghosts, but after hearing the truth from Joan, he unsuccessfully begs Jay, who is about to run some errands, to release him. Thorfinn enters the trap and shocks its circuits, allowing him and Sass to escape back over the barrier just as Jay crosses it. Sass and Joan reunite and begin passionately kissing. Meanwhile, Flower criticizes Trevor for wasting the money from his corporate job by bidding on a pair of ice skates from The Cutting Edge, rather than helping the world by donating to charity. Trevor and Hetty plan to teach Flower a lesson by having Trevor give her $5,000 to use as she sees fit, but then have Hetty tempt her by mentioning scented candles Flower could buy and smell. Instead, Flower has Sam outbid Trevor on the skates for her, then demands $10,000 from him for charity, or else she will tell Thor to zap the lights and set the skates on fire.
69	19	"Pinkus Returns"	Christine Gernon	Skander Halim & Talia Bernstein	April 17, 2025	GHO419	5.03
Pinkus, Trevor's former coworker to whom he lent his pants, arrives at the mansion with his daughter Abby and tells the Arondekars how he found a phone number in Trevor's pants for Trevor's now-deceased girlfriend Laurie Goldstein, whom Pinkus married. However, he has not told Abby that Trevor is her biological father, so he confides this to the Arondekars. At Trevor's insistence, Sam asks Abby questions so he can get to know her better. However, when he tries texting Pinkus to tell Abby the truth, he mistakenly sends the message to Abby due to the similarity of her name to Adam, Pinkus's first name. Though Abby is angry with Adam for lying, Trevor puts together a photo montage on her phone of the father/daughter moments she and Adam shared as she was growing up, motivating her to reconcile with her living father. Elsewhere, Pete prepares to break up with Donna, who swears she did not kill her husband Gerald and requests that Pete interview other ghosts to clear her name. Pete meets Richard, the late husband of Linda and Donna's former neighbor who died with a Walkman that only plays the album Purple Rain, but he assures him that Donna was the killer and he could not intervene as a ghost. Taking notes, Jay realizes that Prince released Purple Rain in 1984, meaning Richard was alive at the time. Richard admits Linda killed Gerald out of revenge for accidentally trampling her flower garden while parking his car. The Arondekars file an anonymous tip to incarcerate Linda and exonerate Donna. Sam considers investigating more cold cases with Pete before deciding that meeting the other ghosts' needs is enough work.
70	20	"I Know What You Did Thirty-Seven Summers Ago"	Richie Keen	Kira Kalush & Guy Endore-Kaiser	April 24, 2025	GHO420	5.05
On April 20, the Arondekars host a reelection fundraiser for Tad, the mayor of Hudson Valley, at Jay's restaurant. The ghosts recognize Tad as Stephanie's prom date, and he uses the story of how he tried to defend her from her killer to promote his image as a brave leader. Stephanie is furious to see him, telling Sam that he ran away in fear instead. To gain Stephanie's approval, the Arondekars prepare to call out Tad during his speech, but Nancy confirms with Isaac that Stephanie lied yet again, having witnessed Tad's attempt to defend Stephanie. Just as Sam and Jay claim that Tad ran away during his speech, Isaac whispers the truth to Sam, who then claims they were making a false accusation as a test of Tad's courage. Stephanie confesses she lied because she was upset that, five days after her murder, Tad became romantically involved with former classmate Melanie del Vecchio. Sam and Jay apologize, claiming they were high on marijuana because it was 4/20. Melanie, who is now Tad's wife, clarifies that she and Tad bonded over their grief for Stephanie, for whom they named their daughter. They forgive the Arondekars and agree to help them with their restaurant license. Meanwhile, Jay tasks Pete with keeping his marijuana-loving chef Gabe in check; when Pete catches Gabe smoking pot in his car, he smells the smoke and becomes high himself. Flower encourages him to be more relaxed about life, and Alberta finally becomes interested in Pete due to his new attitude and recent history of standing up for himself, but before she can kiss him, he snaps out of his high and decides to remain faithful to Donna. That night, Flower takes Stephanie, Trevor, and Hetty to Gabe's car to smell his pot smoke and listen to Grateful Dead music.
71	21	"Kyle"	Trent O'Donnell	Joe Port & Joe Wiseman	May 1, 2025	GHO421	4.86
In Montreal, Pete encounters Kyle, a man who started seeing ghosts after colliding with a bird on a roller coaster. He brings Kyle to Woodstone, where he and Sam immediately connect over their shared ability and she hires him as a new assistant. Feeling left out, Jay starts digging into Kyle's past when Bela, who is attracted to him, says she has been looking up pictures of him online. Jay learns that Kyle spent six months in prison for breaking and entering, but as he attempts to use this information against him, Kyle explains that he knew an old woman named Marian who, when she died and became a ghost, asked him to recover a family brooch she left behind in the house and had planned to pass on to her daughter. Failing to negotiate a peaceful way back into the house, Kyle resorted to crime in order to give Marian closure. Moved by his words, Sam reconsiders her decision to fire him but then dismisses him anyway as he attempts to kiss her. Elsewhere, Sasappis expresses his worries about his first night of being intimate with Joan to his friends. Thorfinn suggests acting strongly by picking up and carrying her to bed, as he demonstrates with Flower; when Sass tries to do the same, he accidentally throws Joan out of the house through the bedroom wall. That evening, Joan reminds him to let go of his worries and trust his instincts, and they share a kiss, awakening a napping Pete, who sees himself out. Later, Sass subtly informs his friends that sex with Joan was a success, and the ghosts rejoice.
72	22	"The Devil Went Down to Woodstone"	Christine Gernon	Story by : Brian Bahe; Teleplay by : Emily Schmidt & Greg Worswick	May 8, 2025	GHO422	4.80
Sam convinces her publisher Sharon to let her host the launch party for Isaac's autobiographical vampire novel at Jay's restaurant so Isaac can celebrate with the Arondekars. Patience, who comes out of the dirt to pursue an evil presence, threatens to ruin the party, believing it is the source of the evil as she learns about vampires from the main ghosts. Sasappis and Trevor send her to investigate the mansion, where Alberta privately tells Hetty she had an erotic dream about Pete. Hetty reveals this secret to Patience to keep her from going back to the restaurant, and Patience rallies most of the Woodstone ghosts to place Alberta on trial. Alberta describes how her feelings for Pete have become sincerely romantic, and she notices Pete listening among the crowd before walking away. Jay's sister Bela, who has been seeing Kyle without her boyfriend Eric's knowledge, enters the room, gossiping on the phone with Kyle about Sam and Jay's plans to stall Patience, who furiously returns to the restaurant and makes the walls bleed while Sam reads a passage from the book. Jay passes this off as a special effect, making a humiliated Patience leave amid the applause. During a conversation with Sam, another publisher mentions Jay's publicist, whom he had neglected to tell Sam about. Sam is horrified to learn the publicist is Elias, who made a deal with Jay under the name "Brett McAfee" to doom his soul to Hell and warns Jay he has little time left on Earth, causing Jay to avoid anything that could kill him. Pete returns from a trip to St. Lucia to break up with Donna and shares a kiss with Alberta, who brings him up to speed on how the launch party ended.

=== Season 5 (2025–26) ===
No. overall	No. in season	Title	Directed by	Written by	Original release date	Prod. code	U.S. viewers (millions)
73	1	"Soul Custody"	Richie Keen	John Blickstead & Trey Kolmer	October 16, 2025	GHO501	4.14
Jay repairs the ghost trap and puts in a doll-sized recliner, thinking that, after Elias kills him, he can hide out in the ghost trap to avoid being sent to Hell. Patience attempts to "smite" Elias, now believing that doing so will allow her passage to the afterlife, but has a crisis of confidence when she fails to summon any superhuman abilities to do so. Flower suggests Alberta flirt with Elias to convince him to change back into ghost form, then trap Elias inside it and threaten to eviscerate him unless he releases Jay from the contract. The plan works, but after Jay starts the timer to destroy Elias, he discovers he accidentally caught Carol as well. Most of the ghosts are willing to sacrifice Carol, but Jay and Pete refuse, freeing them both. After talking with Isaac, Patience tries to do good and offers to sacrifice herself for Jay, who repels Elias's telepathic attacks, but backs out. Pete offers to sacrifice himself for his best friend, but Carol takes the deal to finally do right by Pete. Carol is initially sent to Hell, but her selfless action allows her to instead move on to the afterlife. In celebration, a free Jay buys a real recliner. Pete and Alberta announce to everyone they kissed, though the ghosts point out after this that Pete was willing to go to Hell.
74	2	"Viking Wedding"	Richie Keen	Joe Port & Joe Wiseman	October 23, 2025	GHO502	4.23
The Farnsbys leave on a swingers' trip for several months and rent out their house. Sam and Jay learn the renters are Garret and Libby, who think they are crazy, having heard about the Halloween when Carol died. Wanting to go on the couples' trips Garret and Libby are known for, the Arondekars invite them to the restaurant. On the Farnsby property, Thorfinn's son Bjørn announces to his father that he is about to marry Judy Farnsby the next day, at which point Garret and Libby move a bookshelf in front of the window Bjørn uses to see and yell to Thor. At the dinner, Sam's attempt to mention the bookcase is rebuffed, though Sam and Jay make a good impression. Trevor and Sasappis wait on hold for several hours with the water company on Sam's behalf, as Trevor gives Sass the idea that enough small good deeds could add up and get them to the afterlife. Isaac learns about their competition for good deed "points" and decides to compete as well. Pete hears that Garret and Libby are leaving for the weekend, so Sam and Jay break into the house and move the bookcase, allowing Thor to see the wedding. Garret and Libby return early, and Sam sneaks out the window just in time to speak to the water company. Jay moves the bookcase back in front of the window and hides in the closet, returning home after listening in horror as Garret and Libby watch what they realize is a Farnsby orgy DVD.
75	3	"Halloween 5: The Mummy"	Pete Chatmon	Josh Malmuth	October 30, 2025	GHO503	4.74
Looking in the basement for Halloween decorations, Sam and Jay come across an ancient Egyptian sarcophagus bought by Hetty and Elias in 1890. Jay translates the hieroglyphs on the enclosed scroll and accidentally releases the ghost of Amunhotep, who was unintentionally bound to the mummy inside. While he couldn't see, he could hear everything and thus has a hatred for the Woodstone family, as being taken from his tomb separated him from his wife's spirit, who was also bound to her mummy. Although Hetty hides her identity at first, an unknowing Nancy tells Amunhotep the truth when he sees a painting of Hetty; rushing down to the basement, he hears Jay comment that Sam is a descendant. He curses them, sending a swarm of locusts to destroy Jay's vegetable garden and reanimating his mummy to attack Sam. Sam and Hetty make peace with Amunhotep, offering to send his sarcophagus to a museum in Egypt, where his wife is now located, and send Pete with him to say the incantation to free her as well. Meanwhile, Nigel approaches Sam about holding a séance on Halloween to call back the spirit of Chris the stripper, whom Isaac lied about moving onto the afterlife. Sam tells Nigel the truth about Chris choosing to fly away with his parachute. Nigel confronts Isaac about this, though he realizes Isaac lied to protect Nigel's feelings as Chris didn't say goodbye.
76	4	"Bring Your Daughter to Work Day"	Pete Chatmon	Guy Endore-Kaiser	November 6, 2025	GHO504	4.54
Trevor learns that Abby recently lost her job, and he persuades the Arondekars to hire her at the restaurant so he can be close to his estranged daughter. Neel, one of the chefs, offers to take out Abby for ice cream in a seemingly flirtatious manner, prompting Sam and Jay to host an emergency seminar discouraging workplace romantic relationships. Tired of being deceived like she was last time concerning her father, Abby, who was simply receiving help from Neel to buy her meals, threatens to quit, but Trevor convinces Sam to reveal her ability to see ghosts. Abby believes this to be another lie and challenges Trevor to push her large water bottle off a table, which he does using all his strength, proving his existence as a ghost. Meanwhile, with support from Pete, Alberta, and Sasappis, Flower runs against Isaac to be elected representative leader of the upstairs ghosts as part of a larger campaign to become leader of both the upstairs and basement ghosts. The trio has trouble coaching her until she passes through Gabe, temporarily nullifying the effects of her drugs and causing her to speak intelligently and articulately enough to win a debate with Isaac. Pete and Alberta then suggest that Isaac campaign to become the leader of the cholera ghosts, which he accepts, allowing the couple to finally have their own room together.
77	5	"T-Daddy"	Heather Jack	Rupinder Gill	November 13, 2025	GHO505	4.51
Using money from his job, Trevor buys Abby a Porsche, but she isn't interested, while Sam becomes obsessed with it. Trevor asks Sam to talk to Abby about her direction in life. While in the car, Sam mishears Abby say she wants to earn a degree in finance, which Trevor agrees to pay for, unaware that Abby actually said she wants to study poetry "in France," to Trevor's derision. He tries sending Bela to talk about her own misadventures in studying arts abroad and how her pottery degree didn't work out well financially, but Sam tells them that Trevor is trying to manipulate Abby. Sam explains to Trevor he can try and guide Abby, but she is a grown woman who will make her own decisions, so Trevor apologizes. After hearing Abby wants to live life to the fullest because Trevor, her mother and others Abby knew died young, he agrees to pay for the trip by selling the Porsche, disappointing Sam. Meanwhile, the restaurant staff wants raises from Jay. He truthfully says he and Sam are barely scraping by, but they believe he's lying when they see Sam in the Porsche. They form a union to strike, even after the car is gone. Jay gets his workers back after Hetty reveals how she tricked the child workers in her factory by giving them meaningless job titles as promotions.
78	6	"Planes, Shanes and Automobiles"	Heather Jack	Akilah Green	November 20, 2025	GHO506	4.50
With Jay's parents on a cruise, Sam and Jay decide to spend their first Thanksgiving at Woodstone. Sam has to go to Chicago for a book signing of her and Isaac's vampire novel but promises to make it back in time. Pete travels with Sam, annoying her with his constant chatter of travel facts and people he used to know. Jay refuses to do Sam's list of inane ghost tasks, so Trevor, pretending to be Jay, invites Kyle to service them. Jay reluctantly agrees to let Kyle be with the ghosts after they threaten to tell Sam about Jay's secret unhealthy eating habits. Since Kyle is legitimately lonely as seeing ghosts drives people away from him, the ghosts offer to help him make peace with Jay. Trevor feeds Kyle NFL facts, but Jay catches on when he realizes Kyle does not know anything about 21st century football. An airport labor strike cancels Sam's flight home. She rents a car and trusts Pete with the GPS, but he tries to take a shortcut he knew which damages the car. Sam is angry with Pete for this and annoying her but admits she is really hurt nobody came to the book signing. As Pete motivates her, Sam apologizes and remembers Pete had an old friend in the area that ran a tour company. The company is now run by Shane, the friend's son, who flies them home on a private helicopter. Kyle is about to leave but Jay decides to let him stay as the dinner includes traditional Lenape dishes and a modern favorite of Sasappis.
79	7	"The Proposal"	Christine Gernon	Sophia Lear	December 4, 2025	GHO507	N/A
Bela's boyfriend Eric plans to propose to her at Woodstone but she is hurt when Eric suddenly cancels on her. Sasappis, despondent over Joan's continued absence, enters Bela's dream that night to commiserate, and he and Bela have sex. They learn too late that Sam told Eric against Jay's wishes to say he was canceling to surprise Bela with the proposal, as Jay's proposal to Sam had gone wrong years ago. They admit what happened to Sam and Jay, who suggest not telling Eric since the event was a dream. Eric overhears the discussion, having hidden in a dishwasher box to surprise Bela. Sass enters Eric's Bob Ross-inspired dream the next night, convincing him to not end things over one misunderstanding. The next day, Bela tells Jay she is more concerned with starting over in dating then losing Eric. Jay convinces her this means Eric isn't the right person for her. Eric overhears again, alongside his parents hiding in nearby bins, and breaks up with Bela. That night, Jay recreates how he wanted his proposal to Sam to go. Meanwhile, Isaac is still trying to live as a basement ghost, but sneaks back upstairs to sleep on a couch and is caught by Nancy. To win the basement ghosts back, he must participate in their Fight Club against the massive "Trunk"; Pete encourages Isaac to not surrender for once. Although Trunk brutally beats him, Isaac wins back the basement ghosts' respect.
80	8	"The Life and Times of Esther Greene"	Christine Gernon	Emily Schmidt	December 11, 2025	GHO508	N/A
Sam wants to pitch Isaac's novel on Todd's successful new podcast in order to continue having the book published. However, Todd is more interested in discussing Jay's restaurant. Despite Jay's attempts to back out, Todd refuses to take no for an answer. Thorfinn seeks revenge on Alberta's revenge-ditch from months earlier by acting on an off-hand remark she made about "Alberta Haynes" not being her real name. Alberta confides that she killed someone, and Thor blabs about this to Pete. When Pete asks Alberta, she reveals her birth name as Esther Greene: a ventriloquist who wanted to give up the act and pursue singing against the public's wishes. She symbolically "murdered" her dummy with a baseball bat, fled to New York, and assumed a new identity while adopting its hat as her own. Todd threatens to have his fanbase ruin the B&B's reputation with a flood of negative reviews after he overhears Sam and Jay criticizing his behavior. Though Todd claims he has lost interest in Alberta, having found no paper trail related to her before 1923, Sam persuades Todd to let both her and Jay appear on the podcast by telling him Alberta's full story. That night, Alberta performs a ventriloquist act with Pete as her dummy, but her jokes provoke Thor to repeatedly attack Pete.
81	9	"It's a Wonderful Christmas Carol"	Richie Keen	Talia Bernstein	December 18, 2025	GHO509	N/A
82	10	"It's a Wonderful Christmas Carol"	Richie Keen	John Blickstead & Trey Kollmer	December 18, 2025	GHO510	N/A
Part 1: Sam has a national news interview for Isaac's novel as a last minute Christmas gift. Thorfinn decides his gift to Flower should be helping her possess a living to enjoy food. Without knowing about the interview and Sam saying he should surprise everyone with his gift, he shocks some decorations, allowing Flower to possess Sam. Meanwhile, Patience bonds with Trevor over not celebrating Christmas, butter churning, and the Hebrew language. They make out, which Trevor regrets, but Patience breaks it off as they come from two different worlds. Flower-as-Sam gets some drugs from Gabe. At the interview, she gives incoherent answers and wrestles with Jay as he tries to stop her from eating the gingerbread replica of Woodstone made by Mark and his son David. Jay drives Sam over the property line, freeing Flower without memories of the possession and ruining Thor's gift. Sam is furious at the ghosts for wrecking the interview and wishes she never got the ability to see and hear them. She wakes up the next morning to find the ghosts ignoring her and another version of herself sitting down in the living room. Part 2: Carol, who can grant wishes at Christmastime as part of her afterlife existence, shows Sam what life would be like without her special ability. In this reality, Sam is best friends with Sasha and Libby, Freddie is still her assistant, and the B&B is thriving. However, Isaac is still closeted and about to marry Hetty after much procrastination, Thor still has night terrors and never learned about Bjorn, Pete never tried leaving the property nor learned about his family, Alberta never solved her murder, Sass is still a secret virgin, Trevor catfishes women online, including Sam, and Flower was lost in the dirt after the well was sealed. Jay never agreed to stay at Woodstone to take care of Sam nor got the idea for his own restaurant, so he took a job in the city, straining their marriage. As Carol says this is permanent, a despondent Sam wishes for her reality back. Carol congratulates Sam, who is sent back to before the interview. Learning what happened from Sam as she wakes up, Thor, Alberta, and Trevor use their powers to delay the interview so Sam can free herself of Flower, who now happily remembers the possession, and the interview goes well. The ghosts believe Sam had a dream from Gabe's drugs, though Sam finds a candy cane from Carol in her pocket. Patience returns, Trevor's seeming sadness making her reconsider, and introduces him and Sass to her friends from the underground.
83	11	"The Others"	Todd Biermann	Skander Halim	February 26, 2026	GHO511	N/A
The underground "others" are actually several members of Flower's former cult, still led by the ghost of Bruce. While at Woodstock, Flower told an undercover cop about the cult's tax evasion. After her death, the cult hid from the police in an underground Cold War bunker on the property, and all accidentally died from carbon monoxide poisoning. Bruce welcomes Flower back and she appears to break up with Thor, but is actually planning to discredit Bruce to free her old friends from his control. Pete overhears Bruce and the cult planning to take Flower to the bunker then trap her in the dirt, as revenge for indirectly causing their deaths. Patience is still pursuing Trevor, who is instead attracted to Patience's best friend, cult member Barbara. Trevor tries to trick Patience into dumping him, but her loyalty to him surprises him. Barbara offers to hook up with Trevor, he refuses, but Patience sees them and returns to the dirt thinking Trevor betrayed her. Sam and Jay postpone leaving for their multiple couples' trip with Garret and Libby, finding the bunker with Jay's new metal detector. The house ghosts save Flower and prove the meteorite Bruce uses to listen to the cosmos is actually just a decorative rock with his car key inside, as all the bodies are still in the bunker. The cult ghosts banish Bruce to the dirt. Sam and Jay have a successful trip (though they missed the first day of social bonding), and call the coroner about the bodies in the bunker the next week.
84	12	"The List"	Todd Biermann	Brian Bahe	March 5, 2026	GHO512	N/A
Sam and the house ghosts meet the bunker ghost of Eugene Woodstone, a wannabe magician who invited the cult to the property in the first place. Sam and Jay wish to impress Paul, who owns a prestigious online list of local B&Bs. Looking for a gift for Paul, Eugene suggests a 19th century antique parlor box. After giving it to him, Hetty reveals the box has cocaine hidden inside. While Sam tries to retrieve it, Eugene distracts Isaac from watching for Paul who later catches Sam hiding under the bed. Eugene reveals he did this on purpose, wanting revenge on Hetty and Sam as his family was always ashamed of and belittled him, saying he wasn't worthy of being a Woodstone. Hetty apologizes saying their family always tried to appear perfect and cover up problems like Hetty hiding how she died and the truth about Alberta's murder. This inspires Sam to be honest with Paul about the cocaine in the box and that the mansion's sordid history would make it worthy to be on his list. Paul agrees to let them be on the list in exchange for keeping the cocaine. Meanwhile, Jay moves his recliner into Thor and Flower's room. Flower doesn't want it there as it is made of leather. Thor dismisses this, thinking any argument is a battle to be won. They attend couples' counseling with Pete who makes Thor realize he is repeating the same mistake he made with his wife Olga and keeping a severed head from battle in their home. Thor apologizes and makes up with Flower.
85	13	"St. Hetty's Day 2: The Help"	Rose McIver	Joe Port & Joe Wiseman	March 12, 2026	GHO513	N/A
Hetty is excited to be seen by the living again on St. Patrick's Day, having Trevor set up an online dating profile for her. Sam must go out of town so she calls in Kyle to babysit the ghosts. At the restaurant, Jay's new trained waiter, Jeff, impresses a writer whose recommendation would be good publicity for the restaurant. Hetty's date stands her up, and Hetty lashes out at Jeff, making him cry and leave. Jay admonishes Hetty for not understanding the skill Jeff had, as she never worked a day in her life. Hetty decides to take over waiting on the writer's table though struggles with remembering the orders. Posing as Sam's aunt to meet the kitchen staff, they teach her tricks to remember and it then goes well. Jeff returns, and Jay dismisses Hetty. But having found pride at work she returns, and the staff rally to support her finishing the shift. Her ghost power wears off at midnight, though only Gabe sees her vanish, and Jay plays it off as Gabe being high. Meanwhile, Bela has been napping a lot and has started seeing Sasappis in her dreams. After Trevor tells him he gets attached too fast, Sasappis tries to play it casual with Bela. Jay suggests Bela and Kyle go on a date as they get along and she knows he can see ghosts. At the restaurant, Sasappis returns and has Kyle tell Bela that Sasappis wants her to be his girlfriend. Bela accepts and goes to have a dream, leaving Kyle dejected.
86	14	"The Water Heater"	Katie Locke O'Brien	Liz Alexander	April 2, 2026	GHO514	N/A
On the day the basement ghosts must choose between Isaac or Creepy Dirk in the run up to elect Ghost Representative, Mark tells Sam and Jay they need a new water heater. Knowing the basement ghosts worship the old one, Isaac convinces Sam to wait one day to replace it so Isaac can win the nomination and deal with the basement ghosts' anger later. Mark installs the new one anyway, and the basement ghosts storm upstairs, thinking Sam broke a promise to Isaac to not replace it. As they prepare to give the guests temporary cholera symptoms with their ghost power as revenge, Isaac admits the truth. The basement ghosts are angry but spare the guests, though Jay accidentally walks through Nancy and is incapacitated. Isaac has Sam hold a funeral for the old water heater. This makes the basement ghosts realize Sam often does what Isaac wants, and they vote for him, having Isaac win his first election. Meanwhile, seeing as the other ghost couples go on double dates, Sasappis asks that he and Bela join Pete and Alberta, with Kyle as ghost translator. The attempt to play charades goes poorly and Alberta makes Sasappis realize he and Bela are from two different worlds. Sasappis and Bela break up amicably in her next dream.
87	15	"Michael Jackson Goes to HR"	Utkarsh Ambudkar	Josh Malmuth	April 9, 2026	GHO515	N/A
Trevor gets in trouble at his job for sending a strip-o-gram to his boss for his birthday. H.R. demands to see "Michael Jackson" in person the next day. Jay refuses to do this at first, but Sam tells him the B & B is struggling and they are dependent on Trevor's salary to stay afloat. Jay poses and "Michael" again, apologizing for things Trevor has said online. It appears to go well, but when Jay mentions and anecdote about his mother, the H.R. representative remembers it and then recognizes him as Jay the chef from Todd's podcast. "Michael" is fired for identity fraud. Sam apologizes for not telling Jay the truth to both protect him and that she was embarrassed her main business is still struggling after years, while Jay's restaurant has had success. The ghosts make Sam realize the struggle of having goals is part of life and Jay later says any success they have is for both of them as a team. In the mail it is discovered "Michael Jackson" never paid taxes and thus Sam and Jay owe the IRS. Jay sits on Trevor as revenge. Meanwhile, Pete went to Jamaica and discovered Alberta's grandmother, Hortense, is a ghost. However he also stopped in St. Lucia to see Donna as friends, offending Alberta. Alberta starts hanging out with Baxter the shed ghost, whom, had a crush on Alberta when she first died in 1929. Alberta laughing at Baxter's subpar impressions make Pete openly angry. Pete apologizes to Alberta and says he will not see Donna, (or any of the other ghosts he hooked up with in his wanderings before they were a couple) anymore.
88	16	"Woodstone Royale"	Cortney Carillo	Sophia Lear	April 16, 2026	GHO516	N/A
Sam and Jay are told Jay can probably avoid jail if they pay the IRS $220K by the end of the month. The only major asset they have would be to sell Woodstone. Brett, from Trevor's former company calls and says they can get $10K if they host an illegal poker tournament. The ghosts propose helping Sam cheat at poker to win the cash they need. The poker game includes a Russian named Boris and actor Iain Armitage, studying for a role. Sam must rely on Flower to go all in against Boris, but loses. Flower insists she saw the cards correctly and that Boris must be cheating. Trevor looks through Boris' pants to confirm this, then uses his ghost power to make the extra cards fall out of the pants. Sam and Jay win, but two police officers enter the mansion, wanting to meet Iain, whom Jay posted a selfie with. The police confiscate the money, leaving Sam and Jay back at square one. Meanwhile, Pete and Sasappis want to do something nice for the basement ghosts who still miss the old water heater. They have Jay's recliner sent down to the basement, but the basement ghosts then get into a brawl as only one ghost can sit on it at a time. Pete and Sasappis apologize, and the basement ghosts are thrilled when the new water heater starts making noises.
89	17	"The Investor"	Katie Locke O'Brien	Guy Endore-Kaiser	April 23, 2026	GHO517	N/A
Tad the mayor offers to buy a majority stake in Woodstone as it would be good press for the upcoming election, saying he would be hands-off. However, he backs out when he sees that Mark is also a business partner. Mark had installed a type of countertops for Tad years ago; Mark claims he installed the correct ones, but Tad claims he told Mark he wanted a different type. Pete goes to Tad's house and learns from a ghost there that Tad is telling the truth, but Mark doesn't realize his mistake as he was distracted by a phone game when Tad requested it. Sam and Jay try to nudge Mark to remember this, but he believes they don't trust him and prepares to leave. It's also Election Day for Ghost Representative. In the closing debate, Isaac wins popularity by saying he had Sam promise to install a popcorn machine in the lobby for the ghosts to smell. Flower isn't lucid during this, so it seems Isaac will win. However, Patience and the bunker ghosts all appear and vote for Flower, causing a tie. At the restaurant, Isaac and the basement ghosts reveal they helped Bruce out of the dirt. However, he votes for Flower as she freed him of his lies. To prove they trust Mark, Sam and Jay finally tell him about the ghosts. At the restaurant, Sam tells the ghosts she doesn't remember agreeing to the popcorn machine as she was playing a game on her phone. Flower makes Sam promise it in exchange for the ghosts proving they're real to Mark. In turn, Mark apologizes to Tad and Tad agrees to the Woodstone deal.
90	18	"Under New Management"	Katie Locke O'Brien	Joe Port & Joe Wiseman	April 30, 2026	GHO518	N/A
Tad now owns 55% of Woodstone and its businesses, saying Sam and Jay can keep running them. However, video is found of Tad using city workers to repair his personal gate, so he is likely out as Mayor. With all this new free time he starts poking around and wanting more say in Woodstone. To distract him, Sam says he is meant to focus on something bigger and should make a fresh start. Reading the old review Trevor arranged for the restaurant, Tad sees mention of the "breasterant" idea and thinks this could become a major chain restaurant and begins plans to test Woodstone as the first one. Tad wishes to name it "Mountains of the Valley" but Trevor already owns the trademark on that name. Sam and Jay assume they're safe but Trevor considers selling it. Trevor changes his mind after hearing a heartbroken Jay leave a voicemail for his father about changes to the restaurant. Tad is about to give up, but a comment by Sam inspires him to name it "Boobs 'n' Steaks" instead. Meanwhile, Joan returns, having fallen out of a plane and landed in Mongolia, spending months walking back to be with Sasappis. Sasappis feels guilty about hooking up with Bela in dreams but the other ghosts tell him not to say anything. Sasappis' improved sexual performance make Joan suspicious, and Flower and Hetty tell her about Bela. Sasappis apologizes to Joan who forgives him, and also has Sasappis enter Bela's dream on her behalf to thank Bela for improving Sasappis' skills as a lover.
91	19	"Gate-gate"	Jay Karas	Talia Bernstein	May 7, 2026	GHO519	N/A
Sam and Jay have told Trevor to give Tad the trademark on "Mountains of the Valley" as it's the less worse name. Tad starts making decisions to prepare for the opening. Sam finds out he is still formally Mayor, but the deciding vote to let him stay is Tad's council nemesis, Gus Heywood. Looking into Gus, Pete recognizes him from the Farnsby orgy DVD. After Jay retrieves the DVD from a flummoxed Garret, Jay goes to blackmail Gus into letting Tad stay on as Mayor. Gus explains the whistleblower that wants Tad out of office for "Gate-gate" is actually Melanie, his wife, and that she won't stop. Meeting her at a different restaurant, Melanie explains Tad always put his work before her, and she wants to spend time with him. Tad sees them, and Melanie confesses. At Woodstone, inspired by the ghosts, Sam tells Tad and Melanie to work together, like her and Jay. Melanie's scheming and Tad's corruption will let them vacation together with taxpayer money. Tad gives up his "breastaurant" plan. Meanwhile, Isaac moves back upstairs but finds he cannot sleep, having gotten used to standing to sleep and other habits of the basement ghosts. He tries to use the upstairs ghosts as substitutes but they find it too strange. Isaac sneaks back down to the basement to sleep, and Nancy and the other basement ghosts say he is still welcome to visit.
92	20	"Polar Opposites"	Jay Karas	Emily Schmidt & Rupinder Gill	May 14, 2026	GHO520	N/A
Paula, the Hollywood producer, returns to Woodstone, scouting the location for the reality show It's Getting Hot In Here: All-Stars. The main ghosts encourage Sam to show Paula the script for "Polar Opposites" a screenplay she has been working on with Joan. Sam gives it to Paula in front of Joan, who says it isn't ready. Paula gives Sam one night to finish it and give it to her the next morning. Sam and Joan work through the night and are happy with it, though disagree on the ending. Sam wants the woman to choose herself, Joan says the ending should be the couple getting together. Joan has Sasappis enter Paula's dream to find out which she would like better. Paula asks questions about the context of the ending so Sasappis can't get a clear answer. The next morning on the phone, Sam hears Paula talk on the phone about her new movie idea she had in a dream. Sam thinks her chance at credit is ruined, if she turns in the script now, Paula will assume Sam used AI to write it. Joan rallies the ghosts, Sam and Jay to gaslight Paula into believing Sam gave her the script the prior night, and that Paula believes she forgot because she took a sleeping pill. The plan works, though Paula proves Joan right about the ending. The executives like the idea for Sam's script, and Woodstone also lands the reality show. Meanwhile, Hetty wishes to host a ghost party to celebrate Flower's election. Thor, feeling neglected by Flower's new responsibilities, insists on helping plan it. Flower likes Hetty's ideas more but tells Thor she would never leave him behind. The party is a success and includes one idea of Thor's. Isaac is forgotten in the woods after Hetty tricks him into staying there for the night, so he doesn't ruin the party.
93	21	"Up the Creek"	Richie Keen	Akilah Green & Skander Halim	May 21, 2026	GHO521	N/A
94	22	"Across the Pond"	Richie Keen	Brian Bahe & Greg Worswick	May 21, 2026	GHO522	N/A
Tad tells Sam and Jay he has sold his stake in Woodstone to the Evercreek water company they hate. The company says in less than three days Woodstone will be torn down to build a data center. The Farnsbys return and are against this, putting Sam and Jay in touch with Joe, a local historian. Joe says none of the main ghosts were famous enough in life for Woodstone to become a historical landmark. Nancy reveals that her actual name is really Adeline Marie Dunham and she was a famous English princess from Bedford who went missing after rejecting royal life in disgrace. She made her way to North America and drank some water at Stuart's cabin, dying of cholera. She has a necklace on her being that proves her heritage and Thor shows it is in the mansion. It was given to Hetty as a child after her father stole it off Nancy's corpse. Joe believes in the locket but needs proof it was really Princess Adeline's. Meanwhile, the ghosts realize a data center would be uncomfortable and impossible to sleep in. With the bunker likely safe, Isaac, Trevor, Flower and Hetty must ask Eugene and the bunker ghosts if they can stay there. The bunker ghosts don't like Hetty as she insulted them when they wanted to watch TV. The house ghosts eventually negotiate letting them all stay in the bunker in exchange for the bunker ghosts getting TV time again. After Joe's rejection on the necklace, Nancy remembers a painted portrait of her wearing it. Sam and Jay track it to Nancy's former castle in England. As Sam and Pete prepare to leave for London, Paula calls and says the Hollywood producers want to talk to Sam about a possible movie trilogy and Sam must have ideas ready this weekend. Calling Kyle, Jay and Pete go to London with him instead. Though all portraits were believed lost in a fire decades ago, a castle ghost in an armor suit tells them that Nancy's portrait was given to a museum beforehand. They go talk to the archivist and Kyle and Pete see Amunhotep is there. The two ghosts search through the archives, Pete begins fading but asks Jay not be told to not worry him. They find the painting in the ninth box on the thirty-seventh aisle and Amunhotep summons a swarm of locusts to distract the archivist, so Jay can send Sam a picture of the portrait. Paula tells Sam the producers liked the pitch but want to bring in someone else to write another draft. The house ghosts tell Sam to stick to her vision. Sam tells Paula this and is allowed to stay on as writer. The proof of the portrait allows Joe to declare Woodstone a historical landmark. Since the land cannot be touched, Evercreek offers to sell the Woodstone stake back to Sam, which she can pay for with the money from the Hollywood deal. As Jay drives back to Woodstone, Pete is reduced to just his head in the backseat and disappears into nothing right before Kyle's eyes.

=== Season 6 (2026) ===
No. overall	No. in season	Title	Directed by	Written by	Original release date	Prod. code	U.S. viewers (millions)
95	1	"Halloween 6: The Mirror"	Cortney Carrillo	Guy Endore-Kaiser	October 29, 2026	GHO601	TBD
96	2	"Halloween 6: The Mirror"	Cortney Carrillo	Rupinder Gill	October 29, 2026	GHO602	TBD
Part 1: Several months after Pete has vanished, Kyle has moved in, working for Jay and the ghosts; while Sam is in Australia working on her film. On Halloween, Jay and Kyle accidentally break a mirror. Jay buys a similar one at a local antique shop. The new mirror had belonged to Hetty's family. As Hetty's sister, Margaret, was dying, Hetty uncovered the mirror to do cocaine off of it. Margaret's spirit became trapped in the mirror as a result. Hetty is unhappy to see Margaret, as Margaret told their father Hetty was in love with the painter Julian, ruining Hetty's chance at love. Alberta is excited as another Halloween séance might bring back Pete. However, Sasappis reveals Pete had said if he ever made it to the afterlife, he wouldn't want to be called back with a séance, partially because speaking too much of Heaven would lead to him melting. Alberta initially refuses to call off the séance, but agrees after experiencing a vision of Pete returning, but immediately melting after revealing too much about Heaven. Hetty approaches the mirror to talk to Margaret and is pulled in to take Margaret's place in the mirror, which is only possible on Halloween. As Bela hosts a Halloween party to impress a guy named Evan, the ghosts and Kyle see Margaret is free, believing the sisters made up. Believing the mirror empty, Jay and Mark prepare to take it to the dump, with Hetty still trapped inside. Part 2: Jay and Mark are startled by Gabe and drop the mirror, shattering it into many pieces of Hetty. Margaret reaches the end of the property line, wanting to go to Paris, but is told by Flower about the ghost boundaries. Margaret hides from the other ghosts until after midnight, with Flower believing it is a game. Kyle and Jay reassemble the mirror, but one piece containing one of Hetty's ears is still missing. Hetty listens realizing it is in Evan's costume, forcing a humiliated Bela to track Evan down with Jay after Evan hit it off with someone else. The mirror shows Hetty past visions of what happened with Margaret: she was in love with Julian first and asked Hetty to see if Julian felt the same about her, but Hetty never listened to her sister. Margaret is caught. Isaac briefly enters the mirror to allow the sisters to talk freely. Hetty apologizes. As it's Margaret's dream to go to Paris, she re-enters the mirror which is then sent to Abby, whose apartment has a stunning view of the city. The next day, on the 41st anniversary of Pete's death, he reappears on Woodstone's front lawn, but with no memory of dying nor any of the Woodstone ghosts.
97	3	"Died Hard: A Ghosts Christmas Special"	Todd Bierman	Joe Port & Joe Wiseman	December 10, 2026	GHO603	TBD
98	4	"Died Hard: A Ghosts Christmas Special"	Todd Bierman	Emily Schmidt	December 10, 2026	GHO604	TBD

== Ratings ==
=== Season 1 ===
Viewership and ratings per episode of List of Ghosts (American TV series) episodes
No.	Title	Air date	Rating (18–49)	Viewers (millions)	DVR (18–49)	DVR viewers (millions)	Total (18–49)	Total viewers (millions)
1–2	"Pilot" / "Hello!"	October 7, 2021	0.6	5.52	0.2	1.79	0.8	7.31 (Note: Live+7 ratings were unavailable, so Live+3 ratings have been used instead.)
3	"Viking Funeral"	October 14, 2021	0.6	5.27	0.4	2.53	1.0	7.80
4	"Dinner Party"	October 21, 2021	0.5	5.20	0.3	2.52	0.9	7.72
5	"Halloween"	October 28, 2021	0.6	5.76	0.3	1.74	0.9	7.51
6	"Pete's Wife"	November 4, 2021	0.5	5.94	0.3	1.79	0.8	7.73
7	"Flower's Article"	November 11, 2021	0.5	5.23	0.2	2.07	0.7	7.29
8	"D&D"	November 18, 2021	0.6	5.42	0.4	2.53	0.9	7.94
9	"Alberta's Fan"	December 2, 2021	0.6	5.46	0.4	2.82	1.0	8.27
10	"Possession"	December 9, 2021	0.5	5.75	0.4	2.49	0.9	8.23
11	"Sam's Mom"	January 6, 2022	0.7	6.48	—N/a	—N/a	—N/a	—N/a
12	"Jay's Sister"	January 13, 2022	0.7	6.47	—N/a	—N/a	—N/a	—N/a
13	"The Vault"	January 20, 2022	0.7	6.68	0.3	2.05	1.0	8.73
14	"Ghostwriter"	February 24, 2022	0.6	5.85	0.3	2.36	0.9	8.21
15	"Thorapy"	March 3, 2022	0.5	5.52	0.3	2.27	0.8	7.79
16	"Trevor's Pants"	March 31, 2022	0.6	6.23	0.4	2.75	1.0	8.98
17	"Attic Girl"	April 14, 2022	0.6	5.96	0.4	2.86	1.0	8.81
18	"Farnsby & B"	April 21, 2022	0.6	6.25	0.4	2.72	1.0	8.96

=== Season 2 ===
Viewership and ratings per episode of List of Ghosts (American TV series) episodes
No.	Title	Air date	Rating (18–49)	Viewers (millions)	DVR (18–49)	DVR viewers (millions)	Total (18–49)	Total viewers (millions)
1	"Spies"	September 29, 2022	0.6	6.46	0.4	2.77	1.0	9.23
2	"Alberta's Podcast"	October 6, 2022	0.5	6.21	0.4	2.77	0.9	8.98
3	"Jay's Friends"	October 13, 2022	0.6	6.54	0.4	2.50	1.0	9.04
4	"The Tree"	October 20, 2022	0.5	6.08	0.4	2.65	0.9	8.73
5	"Halloween 2: The Ghost of Hetty's Past"	October 27, 2022	0.5	6.78	0.4	2.60	0.9	9.38
6	"The Baby Bjorn"	November 3, 2022	0.6	6.15	0.4	2.71	1.0	8.87
7	"Dumb Deaths"	November 10, 2022	0.6	6.61	0.4	2.79	1.0	9.40
8	"The Liquor License"	December 8, 2022	0.6	6.35	0.4	2.21	0.9	8.56
9–10	"The Christmas Spirit"	December 15, 2022	0.6	7.00	—N/a	—N/a	—N/a	—N/a
11	"The Perfect Assistant"	January 5, 2023	0.6	6.55	0.4	2.70	1.0	9.25
12	"The Family Business"	January 12, 2023	0.6	6.47	0.4	2.54	0.9	9.00
13	"Ghost Hunter"	February 2, 2023	0.6	6.91	TBD	TBD	TBD	TBD
14	"Trevor's Body"	February 9, 2023	0.6	6.98	TBD	TBD	TBD	TBD
15	"A Date to Remember"	February 16, 2023	0.6	6.53	TBD	TBD	TBD	TBD
16	"Isaac's Book"	March 2, 2023	0.5	6.46	TBD	TBD	TBD	TBD
17	"Weekend from Hell"	March 9, 2023	0.6	6.62	TBD	TBD	TBD	TBD
18	"Alberta's Descendant"	March 30, 2023	0.6	6.31	TBD	TBD	TBD	TBD
19	"Ghost Father of the Bride"	April 13, 2023	0.5	6.26	TBD	TBD	TBD	TBD
20	"Woodstone's Hottest Couple"	April 27, 2023	0.5	6.35	TBD	TBD	TBD	TBD
21	"Whodunnit"	May 4, 2023	0.5	6.40	TBD	TBD	TBD	TBD
22	"The Heir"	May 11, 2023	0.6	6.51	TBD	TBD	TBD	TBD

=== Season 3 ===
Viewership and ratings per episode of List of Ghosts (American TV series) episodes
No.	Title	Air date	Rating (18–49)	Viewers (millions)
1	"The Owl"	February 15, 2024	0.7	7.05
2	"Man of Your Dreams"	February 22, 2024	0.4	6.05
3	"He Sees Dead People"	February 29, 2024	0.5	6.10
4	"Halloween 3: The Guest Who Wouldn't Leave"	March 7, 2024	0.5	5.64
5	"The Silent Partner"	March 14, 2024	0.5	5.51
6	"Hello, Brother"	April 4, 2024	0.5	5.86
7	"The Polterguest"	April 11, 2024	0.6	6.08
8	"Holes Are Bad"	April 18, 2024	0.5	6.20
9	"The Traveling Agent"	April 25, 2024	0.5	6.07
10	"Isaac's Wedding"	May 2, 2024	0.5	5.95

=== Season 4 ===
Viewership and ratings per episode of List of Ghosts (American TV series) episodes
No.	Title	Air date	Rating (18–49)	Viewers (millions)	DVR (18–49)	DVR viewers (millions)	Total (18–49)	Total viewers (millions)
1	"Patience"	October 17, 2024	0.5/5	5.57	0.2	2.08	0.7	7.65
2	"Sam's Dad"	October 24, 2024	0.5/5	5.55	0.2	1.97	0.7	7.53
3	"Halloween 4: The Witch"	October 31, 2024	0.5/6	5.82	0.3	2.02	0.7	7.84
4	"The Work Retreat"	November 7, 2024	0.4/4	5.31	0.2	2.05	0.7	7.36
5	"A Star Is Dead"	November 14, 2024	0.4/4	5.40	0.3	2.24	0.7	7.64
6	"The Primary Source"	December 5, 2024	0.4/4	5.44	0.3	2.04	0.7	7.49
7	"Sad Farnsby"	December 12, 2024	0.4/4	5.53	0.2	1.94	0.6	7.47
8–9	"A Very Arondekar Christmas"	December 19, 2024	0.5/5	4.90	0.2	1.67	0.7	6.57
10	"The Not-So-Silent Partner"	January 30, 2025	0.4/5	5.38	0.2	1.96	0.6	7.34
11	"Thorapy 2: Abandonment Issues"	February 6, 2025	0.5/6	5.47	0.2	1.75	0.6	7.72
12	"It's the End of the World as We Know It and What Were We Talking About?"	February 13, 2025	0.4/5	5.40	0.2	1.93	0.6	7.34
13	"Ghostfellas"	February 20, 2025	0.4/5	5.61	0.2	1.81	0.7	7.42
14	"Alexander Hamilton and the Ruffle Kerfuffle"	February 27, 2025	0.5/7	5.41	0.2	1.97	0.7	7.38
15	"The Bachelorette Party"	March 6, 2025	0.5/7	5.75	0.2	1.76	0.7	7.50
16	"St. Hetty's Day"	March 13, 2025	0.4/6	5.35	0.2	1.83	0.6	7.18
17	"His Girl Shiki"	April 3, 2025	0.5/6	5.21	0.3	2.07	0.7	7.27
18	"Smooching and Smushing"	April 10, 2025	0.4/5	5.13	0.2	1.93	0.6	7.06
19	"Pinkus Returns"	April 17, 2025	0.4/6	5.03	0.2	1.91	0.6	6.94
20	"I Know What You Did Thirty-Seven Summers Ago"	April 24, 2025	0.3/4	5.05	0.2	1.84	0.5	6.89
21	"Kyle"	May 1, 2025	0.4/5	4.86	0.2	1.77	0.6	6.64
22	"The Devil Went Down to Woodstone"	May 8, 2025	0.4/5	4.80	0.2	1.77	0.6	6.57

=== Season 5 ===
Viewership and ratings per episode of List of Ghosts (American TV series) episodes
No.	Title	Air date	Rating/share (18–49)	Viewers (millions)	DVR (18–49)	DVR viewers (millions)	Total (18–49)	Total viewers (millions)	Ref.
1	"Soul Custody"	October 16, 2025	0.3/4	4.14	0.2	2.00	0.5	6.13	
2	"Viking Wedding"	October 23, 2025	0.4/4	4.23	0.2	1.80	0.6	6.02	
3	"Halloween 5: The Mummy"	October 30, 2025	0.3/4	4.74	0.2	1.84	0.6	6.58	
4	"Bring Your Daughter to Work Day"	November 6, 2025	0.4/5	4.54	0.1	1.36	0.5	5.90	
5	"T-Daddy"	November 13, 2025	0.4/5	4.51	TBD	TBD	TBD	TBD	
6	"Planes, Shanes and Automobiles"	November 20, 2025	0.4/4	4.50	TBD	TBD	TBD	TBD	
