= The Great Lakes Suite =

Studio album by Rheostatics
- Released: November 21, 2025
- Genre: indie rock
- Length: 68 minutes
- Label: Cordova Bay Records

Rheostatics chronology
Here Come the Wolves (2019)	The Great Lakes Suite (2025)

The Great Lakes Suite is the thirteenth album by the Canadian rock band Rheostatics, released November 21, 2025 on Cordova Bay Records.

The album was originally inspired by a desire to create another conceptual project comparable to the band's 1995 album Music Inspired by the Group of Seven, and began after Dave Bidini hit on the idea of a suite about the Great Lakes. Bidini also stated that given the current climate of political tensions between Canada and the United States around Donald Trump's tariffs and annexation threats, he hoped that the album would resonate with American listeners as well, given that the Great Lakes are shared between both countries and stand as a symbol of unity, co-operation and friendship rather than division.

== Production ==
The process of creating the album started in 2023, with early improvisational jams leading up to formal recording sessions in 2024. The main band lineup consisted of Bidini, Dave Clark, Tim Vesely, Kevin Hearn, Don Kerr and Hugh Marsh; regular band member Martin Tielli did not participate in the recording due to a desire to step back from music, but supported the project, played a role in securing Alex Lifeson's involvement, and contributed artwork for both the album booklet and the animated music video for "The Inland Sea".

Guest contributors included Lifeson, Tanya Tagaq, Chief Stacey LaForme, Laurie Anderson, Anne Carson, Kendel Carson and Liz Howard. One piece, "The Drop Off", features the musicians performing instrumental music behind a recording of a spoken-word monologue that Gord Downie performed at a fundraiser for Lake Ontario Waterkeeper in the 2000s.

== Release ==
The album was released on November 21, 2025, and was launched with two concerts on November 21 and 22 at the TD Music Hall in Toronto, featuring guest contributions by Lifeson and Marsh, and multimedia video by Nicholas de Pencier and Jennifer Baichwal.

The concerts centred principally on music and spoken word from the album, along with improvisation in its style and approach, rather than on the entirety of the band's catalogue. Live shows concluded with Gordon Lightfoot's "The Wreck of the Edmund Fitzgerald", which the band had originally recorded for their 1991 album Melville.

== Track listing ==
All music is composed by Rheostatics and Alex Lifeson, except where noted.

No.	Title	Lyrics	Music	Length
1.	"The Moon Dreams (feat. Anne Carson)"	Carson	spoken word	0:15
2.	"Huron"			3:36
3.	"Homes (feat. Laurie Anderson & Kendel Carson)"	Bidini, K. Hearn		5:27
4.	"Lake Michigan Triangle (feat. Maiah Wynne)"			6:01
5.	"Geology (feat. Neil O'Donnell)"	O'Donnell		2:17
6.	"The Drop Off (feat. Gord Downie)"	Downie		4:12
7.	"Thunder Bay"		Lifeson, Marsh	2:03
8.	"She Walks Forever (feat. Chief Stacey Laforme)"	Laforme	K. Hearn	5:03
9.	"Friday 4:20 a.m. Swimming (feat. Anne Carson & Hugh Marsh)"	Carson	Marsh	1:39
10.	"Mishipeshu (feat. Alex Lifeson)"			5:26
11.	"Tasiq (feat. Tanya Tagaq)"		Rheostatics, Lifeson, Tagaq	7:14
12.	"Thursday 12 p.m. Swimming (feat. Anne Carson)"	Carson		1:36
13.	"Erie (feat. Abøn)"			3:58
14.	"Mammals (feat. Neil O'Donnell)"	O'Donnell		1:53
15.	"A Wake (feat. Liz Howard)"	Howard		7:16
16.	"Water Wisdom (feat. Chief Stacey Laforme)"	Laforme		3:08
17.	"Ode to the Great Lakes (feat. Pat Hearn)"	P. Hearn		2:34
18.	"The Inland Sea"	K. Hearn	K. Hearn	4:22
