= Double Live (Rheostatics album) =

Live album by Rheostatics
- Released: 1997
- Genre: Indie rock
- Label: DROG Records
- Producer: Gary Stokes

Rheostatics chronology
| The Blue Hysteria (1996) | Double Live (1997) | The Nightlines Sessions (1998) |

Professional ratings
Review scores
| Source | Rating |
|---|---|
| AllMusic | 4.5/5 stars |
| The Province | 4 stars |

Double Live is a 1997 album by Rheostatics. It collects a variety of live performances by the band, ranging from intimate club settings to record store sessions to their arena tour with The Tragically Hip in 1996.

The album includes a number of tracks which have never appeared on any previous Rheostatics album. One of these tracks, "Good Canadian", was improvised on the spot, while the version of "Record Body Count" was recorded in the lobby of Calgary's Uptown Theatre after the end of their show there, when the band decided on the spur of the moment to run out and play an extra encore for the fans as they left the venue.

The Hip's live album Live Between Us, released the same year, documents a show for which Rheostatics were the opening band. Gordon Downie acknowledges and thanks Rheostatics at the beginning of that album.

It was the second-biggest selling album of the band's entire career, behind only their major label debut Melville, and was the #1 album of the entire year on Canada's campus radio charts.

== Cover ==
On the cover of the album, Martin Tielli is playing a double neck guitar which he painted himself with a "never quite presented idea" for the new Canadian flag designed by A.Y. Jackson.

== Critical response ==
Tom Harrison of The Province praised the album, writing that "the quintessential thinking Canadian band might have gone overboard with two CDs that log more than two hours but it would be hard to deny the group's feeling that this collection of live recordings taken from a variety of sources is a defining statement. Always literate, maybe too intelligent for their own good, Rheostatics can make complex music that is both beautiful and imploring, simple country songs by smart city boys that have real compassion and hard rock that serves as essays on pop sociology, all the while communicating a Canadian character that exhibits a real love and appreciation of our culture. The true north strong and free of jingoism."

For the Southam News service, Ted Shaw wrote that "Rheostatics have never been zany enough to compete with the likes of the Barenaked Ladies, or career-oriented enough to take on the mainstream with The Tragically Hip. But this live CD, recorded during the band's spring tour of 1997, shows they have elements of what makes both those other bands successful. If the Hip are the musical equivalent of an Atom Egoyan film, Rheostatics would be Bruce McDonald." He concluded that "Double Live is the most honest, if not the most musically accomplished, CD yet from this hard-not-to-like Canadian band."

== Track listing ==
As with many of the band's albums, the songwriting is credited to varying combinations of the band members: Martin Tielli, Dave Bidini and Tim Vesely. (Don Kerr does not receive songwriting credit, as virtually all of these songs predate his arrival in the band. In some cases, even the performance predates Kerr.) Former band member Dave Clark is also credited on some numbers. Songwriting credits for each track are listed below.

=== Disc one ===
1. "Saskatchewan" (Dave Bidini, Martin Tielli) – 7:59
2. "Feed Yourself" (Bidini) – 7:59
3. "Shaved Head" (Bidini, Tielli) – 6:05
4. "Torque, Torque" (Tim Vesely, Paul Quarrington) – 1:39
5. "Claire" (Vesely, Quarrington) – 5:50
6. "Legal Age Life at Variety Store" (Bidini) – 4:07
7. "Dead is the Drunkest You Can Get" (Tielli) – 2:57
8. "Bees" (Bidini) – 1:46
9. "Dope Fiends and Boozehounds" (Bidini, Tielli, Janet Morassutti) – 6:12
10. "Song of Flight" (Bidini, Tielli, Dave Clark) – 1:54
11. "Self Serve Gas Station" (Tielli) – 5:11
12. "Horses" (Bidini) – 8:52
13. "Dope Fiends (Ending)" (Bidini, Tielli, Morassutti) – 2:25
14. "Record Body Count" (Tielli) – 3:34

=== Disc two ===
1. "A Midwinter Night's Dream" (Tielli) – 9:03
2. "The Royal Albert (Joey 2)" (Tielli) – 2:16
3. "Introducing Happiness" (Vesely) – 3:13
4. "Stolen Car" (Bidini) – 5:36
5. "Jesus Was Once a Teenager Too" (Bidini, Tielli) – 4:25
6. "Good Canadian" (Tielli) – 0:31
7. "Bread, Meat, Peas and Rice" (Bidini, Clark) – 3:18
8. "Christopher" (Tielli) – 4:37
9. "The Ballad of Wendel Clark, Parts I and II" (Bidini, Clark, Tielli) – 5:16
10. "Palomar" (Vesely) – 5:10
11. "Triangles on the Wall" (Tielli) – 3:58
12. "People's Republic of Dave" (Bidini) – 4:04
13. "Regina" (Rheostatics) – 1:02
14. "The Wreck of the Edmund Fitzgerald" (Gordon Lightfoot) – 8:14
15. "Desert Island Discs" (Bidini, Clark) – 3:54
