= Greatest Hits (Rheostatics album) =

Studio album by Rheostatics
- Released: 1987
- Genre: Indie rock
- Label: Green Sprouts
- Producer: Tom Atom, Rheostatics

Rheostatics chronology
Greatest Hits (1987)	Melville (1991)

Professional ratings
Review scores
Source	Rating
AllMusic	2.5/5 stars

Greatest Hits is the first studio album by Canadian rock band Rheostatics. Only 1,000 copies were released in 1987, and all sold out. The album was rereleased in 1996.

Despite the album's name, it is not a greatest hits compilation in the conventional sense. It does, however, compile songs from the band's pre-1987 demo releases. The album's best known song is "The Ballad of Wendel Clark, Parts I and II", an ode to Toronto Maple Leafs player Wendel Clark.

== Track listing ==
1. "Crescent Moon" (Dave Bidini) – 2:58
2. "Canadian Dream" (Tim Vesely) – 4:05
3. "The Ballad of Wendel Clark, Parts I and II" (Bidini, Martin Tielli) – 3:30
4. "Ditch Pigs" (Tielli) – 4:22
5. "Higher and Higher" (Bidini) – 3:53
6. "OK by Me" (Bidini, Tielli, Vesely) – 3:20
7. "Churches and Schools" (Vesely) – 3:04
8. "Public Square" (Vesely) – 2:31
9. "Delta 88" (Bidini, Janet Morassutti) – 3:34

== Personnel ==
Personnel taken from Greatest Hits liner notes.

Rheostatics

- Dave Bidini – acoustic and electric guitars, vocals
- Dave Clark – drums
- Martin Tielli – electric and acoustic guitars, bowed guitar, sitar, vocals
- Tim Vesely – bass, acoustic guitar, mandolin, vocals

Production

- Tom Atom – production, engineering
- Rheostatics – production
- Dean Malton – engineering
