= Three O'Clock Train =

Canadian alternative country band

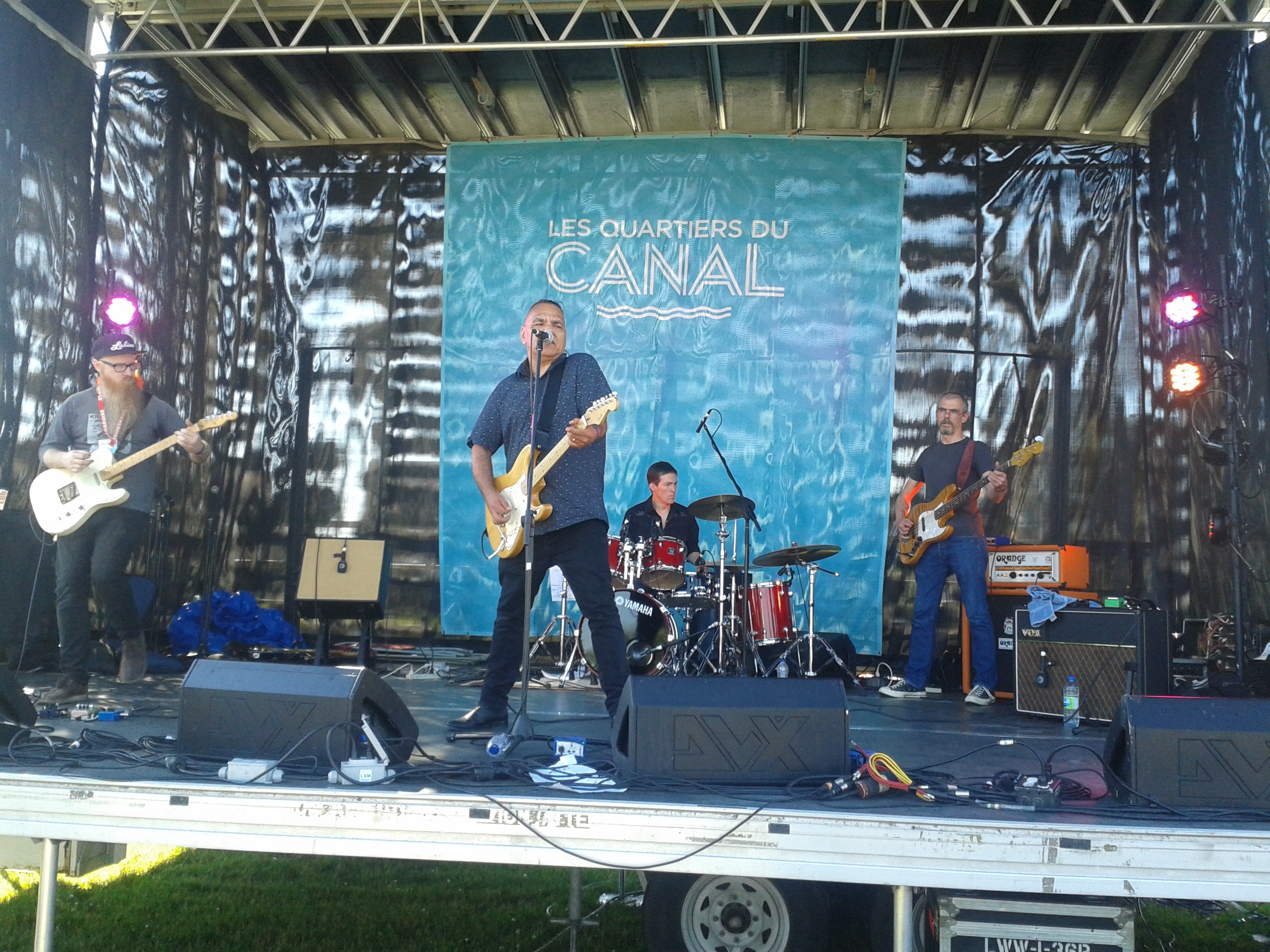

Background information
- Origin: Montreal, Quebec
- Genres: country rock, roots rock, alternative country
- Years active: 1984–1996; 2012–present
- Members: Mack Mackenzie; Stuart Mackenzie; Bob Eaglesham; Colin Burnett; Larry Vitas
- Past members: Alex Soria; Carlos Soria; Stefan Doroschuk; Dave Bidini; Dave Clark; Rod MacKenzie-Shearer; Eric Hammerbeck; Rob Burgess; Kevin Komoda; Gordie Adamson; Roger Dawson; David Hill; Pierre Perron

Three O'Clock Train is a Canadian alternative country band from Montreal, Quebec. Active from 1984 to 1996 in their original incarnation, the band reunited in 2012.

== Origins ==
Prior to Three O'Clock Train, lead singer and guitarist Malcolm "Mack" Mackenzie led a punk-rock band, The Pseuds (formerly Sid Serious and The Pseuds, with Serious on Bass), with Ross Barbour on drums, and Bart Noir on bass. The Pseuds were a busy band, often performing live on a weekly basis at clubs such as Station 10. The Pseuds performed songs that Three O'Clock Train would later use "Be My Baby", and also performed songs co-written by Mackenzie and Kevin Komoda, such as "To Be Modern".

Three O'Clock Train was formed in 1984 by Mackenzie, originally with Stefan Doroschuk of Men Without Hats on guitar and Alex Soria and Carlos Soria of The Nils as the rhythm section. The Soria brothers left the band early on, and were replaced by Dave Hill on bass and Pierre Perron on drums, while Doroschuk was eventually replaced by Mackenzie's brother Stuart.

The band released an EP, Wig Wam Beach, in 1986 and an album, Muscle In, in 1987 on Pipeline Records. Concurrently with Blue Rodeo, to whom they were frequently compared, they were one of the prominent roots rock revival bands on the Canadian music scene in the era. The band's music was also used for the soundtrack to the 1987 National Film Board drama film Train of Dreams, and they were one of the first bands to perform a live session on the CBC Stereo program Brave New Waves.

== Hiatus and return ==
During the national tour to support Muscle In, Mackenzie became disillusioned and abandoned the band's concert in Edmonton, taking a bus back to Montreal immediately after playing the first set. After a hiatus, Mack and Stuart Mackenzie returned in 1989, playing both sets as a duo and with Dave Bidini and Dave Clark of Rheostatics filling in as the rhythm section. They were eventually replaced by guitarist Rod MacKenzie-Shearer, bassist Eric Hammerbeck and drummer Rob Burgess; this lineup completed recording the band's unfinished album It Takes a Lot to Laugh, It Takes a Train to Cry, which was released in 1991 on Justin Time Records. By 1994, the lineup included Kevin Komoda on keyboards, Roger Dawson on bass and Gordie Adamson on drums.

Wig Wam Beach and Muscle In were re-released as a compilation album in 1996 on Just a Memory Records, concurrently with Mack Mackenzie releasing a self-titled solo album on Justin Time.

== Reunion ==
The band reunited in 2012 to record the new album Moon, and followed up with Train of Dreams in 2016. Train of Dreams was supported by a short tour of select Canadian dates with Ford Madox Ford.

The band's current lineup includes the Mackenzie brothers, along with Bob Eaglesham on guitar, Larry Vitas on bass and Colin Burnett on drums.
