= Music Inspired by the Group of Seven =

Studio album by Rheostatics
- Released: 1995
- Genre: Indie rock
- Label: DROG Records

Rheostatics chronology
Introducing Happiness (1994)	Music Inspired by the Group of Seven (1995)	The Blue Hysteria (1996)

Professional ratings
Review scores
Source	Rating
Allmusic	link

Music Inspired by the Group of Seven is a 1995 album by Rheostatics.

The album was commissioned by the National Gallery of Canada to accompany its Group of Seven retrospective show. The album has twelve pieces, most of which are instrumental music. However, snippets of recorded dialogue from the Group of Seven artists, and other contemporaneous figures such as Queen Elizabeth the Queen Mother, Mackenzie King and John Diefenbaker, are mixed in.

None of the twelve pieces are titled on the album cover. However, track 7 is a reworking of "Northern Wish", from the band's 1991 album Melville, and a Rheostatics fansite has compiled a set of unofficial titles for the other tracks which is commonly accepted by the band's fans. Many of these alternate titles were taken from the band's actual set lists, when available.

It is also the band's first album to feature Don Kerr. Kerr replaced Dave Clark on drums. Kerr also interviewed artist Winchell Price, a landscape painter, whose comments on the link between music and visual art open the album as the introduction to the first track.

== Track listing ==
All tracks credited to Rheostatics and Kevin Hearn. None of the songs are officially titled; the names given below are unofficial titles from the website "Rusty Spell Dot Com".

1. "Kevin's Waltz" – 1:45
2. "Earth (Almost)" – 7:36
3. "Boxcar Song (Weiners and Beans)" – 6:35
4. "Landscape and Sky" – 0:40
5. "Blue Hysteria" – 3:29
6. "Cello for a Winter's Day" – 6:24
7. "Northern Wish" – 4:04
8. "Snow" – 1:12
9. "Biplanes and Bombs" – 5:09
10. "Lightning" – 5:40
11. "Yellow Days Under a Lemon Sun (Kevin's Waltz Reprise)" – 4:05
12. "Bye, Bye" – 0:55

== Personnel ==
- Dave Bidini – guitar, drums, vocals
- Kevin Hearn – organ, guitar, piano, vocals, sampling
- Don Kerr – cello, drums, vocals, noise, double bass
- Dan Kurtz – violin
- The Snowflakes – vocals
- The Subliminal Kid – tree trembler
- Douglas Tielli – horns
- Martin Tielli – guitar, vocals
- Tim Vesely – guitar, vocals, double bass
