= Whale Music (album) =

Studio album by Rheostatics
- Released: May 22, 1992
- Recorded: February–March 1992; Reaction Studios, Toronto, Ontario
- Genre: Indie rock
- Label: Sire
- Producer: Matt DeMatteo, James Stewart

Rheostatics chronology
Melville (1991)	Whale Music (1992)	Music from The Motion Picture Whale Music (1994)

Professional ratings
Review scores
Source	Rating
Allmusic	3/5 stars

Whale Music is a 1992 studio album by Canadian rock band Rheostatics. It should not be confused with the soundtrack to the film Whale Music, which was also composed by the band and released in 1994.

A performance from their concert tour to support this album was released in 2005 as The Whale Music Concert, 1992, a download-only album from Zunior Records.

The album cover is part of a painting by guitarist Martin Tielli.

Rheostatics' Dave Bidini says he wrote the track "Dope Fiends and Boozehounds" after hearing a Steve Howe guitar solo on a Yes album. Canadian television personality and radio host Jeff Marek has said the track is his favourite song of all-time.

== Honours ==
In 1996, the Canadian music magazine Chart conducted a reader poll to determine the greatest Canadian albums of all time. Whale Music placed fifth in that poll, behind only Sloan, Joni Mitchell, Neil Young and The Tragically Hip. When the magazine conducted a follow-up poll in 2000, Whale Music placed fourth behind Mitchell, Young and Sloan, and was followed in fifth by the band's 1991 album Melville. In the magazine's third poll in 2005, Whale Music placed tenth. It is one of six albums to have ranked in the top ten in all three polls.

It was ranked 19th in Bob Mersereau's 2007 book The Top 100 Canadian Albums.

== Covers ==
Barenaked Ladies, who had been guest musicians on the album, also covered "Legal Age Life at Variety Store" on the 2007 Rheostatics tribute album The Secret Sessions. Their version also included guest performers Jason Plumb and Tim Mech. On the same album, The Inbreds covered "Dope Fiends and Boozehounds" and By Divine Right covered "Shaved Head".

== Track listing ==
Whale Music track listing
No.	Title	Writer(s)	Lead vocals	Length
1.	"Self Serve Gas Station"	Martin Tielli	Tielli	4:51
2.	"California Dreamline"	Tielli	Tielli	4:21
3.	"Rain, Rain, Rain"	Tielli	Tielli	4:20
4.	"Queer"	Dave Bidini, Dave Clark	Bidini	5:30
5.	"King of the Past"	Bidini, Tim Vesely	Vesely	4:51
6.	"R.D.A. (Rock Death America)"	Bidini, Clark	Bidini	2:32
7.	"The Headless One"	Vesely	Vesely	3:27
8.	"Legal Age Life at Variety Store"	Bidini	Bidini	2:33
9.	"What's Going on Around Here?"	Tielli	Tielli	4:13
10.	"Shaved Head"	Tielli, Bidini	Tielli	5:06
11.	"Palomar"	Vesely	Vesely	4:20
12.	"Guns"	Clark	Clark (spoken)	1:49
13.	"Sickening Song"	Tielli	Tielli	2:54
14.	"Soul Glue"	Vesely	Vesely	3:44
15.	"Beerbash"	Bidini	Bidini	3:50
16.	"Who?"	Vesely	Vesely	3:02
17.	"Dope Fiends and Boozehounds"	Tielli, Bidini, Janet Morassutti	Tielli with Bidini	6:33

== Personnel ==
Rheostatics

- Martin Tielli – vocals, lead guitar
- Dave Bidini – vocals, rhythm guitar, bass
- Dave Clark – vocals, drums, percussion, power tools, alarm clock
- Tim Vesely – vocals, bass, acoustic guitar, piano, accordion, percussion, string arrangements, power tools, mini moog

Additional personnel

- Dave Allen (credited on some tracks as "De Vallion String Quartet") – strings, violin, backing vocals
- Barenaked Ladies (credited as "Scarborough Naked Youth Choir") – chorus
- Joey Bechta – tambourine, backing vocals
- Chris Brown – organ, piano, trombone
- Richard Burgmann – power tools
- Matt DeMatteo – producer, engineer, power tools
- Kevin Gould – arranger
- Gene Hardy – saxophone
- Ormond Jobin – producer, engineer
- Tim Martin – accordion, vocals
- Tim Mech – electric guitar
- Lewis Melville – banjo, pedal steel, electric guitar, steel guitar
- Peter Moore – mastering
- Michael Phillip Wojewoda – guitar, tambourine, backing vocals, Egg shaker, Moog synthesizer
- Neil Peart – percussion, arranger, drums
- Pyramid of Stupidity Singers – vocals
- The Raindrops – backing vocals
- Tannis Slimmon – backing vocals
- James Stewart – producer, engineer
- Dutch Toko – classical guitar
