= Whale music =

Whale music is a term for whale sound. It may also refer to:

- Whale Music (novel), a 1989 novel by Paul Quarrington
- Whale Music (film), a 1994 Canadian film based on the Quarrington novel
  - Music from the Motion Picture Whale Music, the film's 1994 soundtrack by Rheostatics
- Whale Music (album), an unrelated 1992 album by Rheostatics
- Whale Music, 2008 album by David Rothenberg
