= The Buttless Chaps =

Canadian indie rock band

- Origin: Victoria, British Columbia, Canada
- Genres: Indie rock
- Years active: 1998–2009
- Labels: Mint
- Past members: Dave Gowans; Lasse Lutick; Morgan McDonald; Ida Nilsen; Torben Wilson; Stephen Lyons

The Buttless Chaps were a Canadian indie rock band from Victoria, British Columbia, Canada. The group played a hybrid of punk, new wave and alternative country music. Band members included Dave Gowans on vocals, guitar and banjo, Morgan McDonald on keyboards, Lasse Lutick on guitar and synthesizer, Torben Wilson on drums and Ida Nilsen on vocals, accordion, synthesizer and euphonium.

== History ==
The Buttless Chaps were formed in 1998, releasing a self-titled CD in 1999, and following up with Tumblewire in 2000.

Their third album, Death Scenes I II III came out in 2001, and had a country rock theme.

In 2006 the band released Where Night Holds Light on Mint Records, and the album soon appeared on the campus and community radio charts. They were featured on CBC Radio 3's Sessions in June 2007.

In an interview on CBC Radio 3 on January 7, 2009, Dave Gowans announced that the band would be breaking up after completing their remaining touring commitments. The band members moved on to other projects: McDonald to his band Fond of Tigers, Nilsen to Great Aunt Ida and The Violet Archers, Wilson to Clean and Pristine the NOEX Castaway, and Gowans to Cloudsplitter. Today, Gowans and Lutick also own the Vancouver record store Red Cat Records.

== In popular culture ==
A poster for The Buttless Chaps appears in the background of "We'd like to Thank the Academy", an episode (Season 5, Ep. 13) of USA's hit comedy, Psych.

Several posters for The Buttless Chaps also appear on a door in the background of the show Sanctuary (Season 1, Episode 4)

The song "Outlaw" is featured in the movie Rollercoaster, directed by Scott Smith.

"When it's Cold Outside" from the album Cartography plays briefly in the series premiere of the AMC TV show Justified.

== Discography ==
- The Buttless Chaps (1999)
- Tumblewire (2000)
- Death Country Live (2000)
- Death Scenes I II III (2001)
- Experiments (2002)
- Love This Time (2003)
- Where Night Holds Light (2006)
- Cartography (2008)

== See also ==
- Canadian rock
- List of bands from Canada
- List of Canadian musicians
