= The Top 100 Canadian Albums =

2007 book by Bob Mersereau

- Author: Bob Mersereau
- Language: English
- Genre: Non-fiction
- Publisher: Goose Lane Editions
- Publication date: 2007
- Publication place: Canada

The Top 100 Canadian Albums is a book by journalist Bob Mersereau, published in 2007 by Goose Lane Editions.

Mersereau surveyed 600 music journalists, retailers, musicians and disc jockeys of all ages, from all parts of Canada, who each submitted a list of ten favourite Canadian albums released between 1957 and 2007.

== Criticism ==
Mersereau acknowledged that the list would cause debate among music fans across the country. "The important part is to talk about Canadian music and enjoy it," he said. "I'd be shocked if there wasn't complaints and arguments and debates."

A review from the National Post by Mark Medley identifies regional and genre biases in the book. Saying, “While any list of "Top 100" anything is sure to ignite some controversy, there are definitely some glaring omissions,” Medley lists ten albums, four from British Columbia artists. One of these was The New Pornographers’ Mass Romantic. “To completely leave off Carl Newman, Neko Case et al. is plain wrong. I'm grouping in Stars' 2004 album Set Yourself on Fire in with this.” Medley also noted the omission of The Grapes of Wrath's album Now and Again. “This album cracked the top 50 in Chart Magazine's 1996 and 2000 top 50 Canadian albums polls.” As well, Medley noted the underrepresentation of hip hop artists, specifically Maestro Fresh Wes’ Symphony in Effect and Dream Warriors' And Now the Legacy Begins.

Juan Rodriguez in the Montreal Gazette identifies a bias against Quebec artists, particularly francophone. He notes that only 8% of the artists on the list are from Quebec, a province with over 23% of the population of Canada, and that only 2% of the artists are francophone artists from Quebec, a group that comprises 80% of the population of Quebec and close to 19% of the population of Canada. Rodriquez examined Mersereau's list of contributing experts and found that only 10% of them were from Quebec, and 5% were francophones from Quebec. Rodriquez questioned the people excluded from Mersereau's list of experts: “Alain Brunet of La Presse – and dean of local French-language music critics – was not asked for his opinions. Indeed, La Presse, Le Journal de Montréal and The Gazette were shut out. Major observers of "la scène locale" like Patrick Baillargeon and Olivier Robillard Laveaux of Voir aren't there.” Rodriquez concludes that “Mersereau's inability to face all the music created in Canada in a cogent critical manner is disturbing.”

== The list ==
1. Harvest, Neil Young (1972)
2. Blue, Joni Mitchell (1971)
3. After the Gold Rush, Neil Young (1970)
4. Music From Big Pink, The Band (1968)
5. Fully Completely, The Tragically Hip (1992)
6. Jagged Little Pill, Alanis Morissette (1995)
7. The Band, The Band (1969)
8. Funeral, Arcade Fire (2004)
9. Moving Pictures, Rush (1981)
10. American Woman, The Guess Who (1970)
11. Songs of Leonard Cohen, Leonard Cohen (1967)
12. Reckless, Bryan Adams (1984)
13. Five Days in July, Blue Rodeo (1993)
14. Twice Removed, Sloan (1994)
15. Up to Here, The Tragically Hip (1989)
16. Everybody Knows This is Nowhere, Neil Young with Crazy Horse (1969)
17. 2112, Rush (1976)
18. Court and Spark, Joni Mitchell (1974)
19. Whale Music, Rheostatics (1992)
20. Acadie, Daniel Lanois (1989)
21. Day for Night, The Tragically Hip (1994)
22. Rust Never Sleeps, Neil Young & Crazy Horse (1979)
23. Gord's Gold, Gordon Lightfoot (1975)
24. You Were Here, Sarah Harmer (2000)
25. Fumbling Towards Ecstasy, Sarah McLachlan (1993)
26. Road Apples, The Tragically Hip (1991)
27. Gordon, Barenaked Ladies (1992)
28. You Forgot it in People, Broken Social Scene (2002)
29. I'm Your Man, Leonard Cohen (1988)
30. Tonight's the Night, Neil Young (1975)
31. Decade, Neil Young (1977)
32. Miss America, Mary Margaret O'Hara (1988)
33. Surfacing, Sarah McLachlan (1997)
34. One Chord to Another, Sloan (1996)
35. Songs of Love and Hate, Leonard Cohen (1971)
36. Cyborgs Revisited, Simply Saucer (1989)
37. Ingenue, k.d. lang (1992)
38. Melville, Rheostatics (1991)
39. Love Tara, Eric's Trip (1993)
40. On the Beach, Neil Young (1974)
41. Not Fragile, Bachman-Turner Overdrive (1974)
42. The Best of The Guess Who, The Guess Who (1971)
43. Let It Die, Feist (2004)
44. The Last Waltz, The Band (1978)
45. Night Train, Oscar Peterson Trio (1963)
46. Down at the Khyber, Joel Plaskett Emergency (2001)
47. Harvest Moon, Neil Young (1992)
48. Cuts Like a Knife, Bryan Adams (1983)
49. L'Heptade, Harmonium (1976)
50. Teenage Head, Teenage Head (1979)

51. High Class in Borrowed Shoes, Max Webster (1977)
52. Hejira, Joni Mitchell (1976)
53. Bach: The Goldberg Variations, Glenn Gould (1955 and 1982)
54. Fogarty's Cove, Stan Rogers (1977)
55. Wheatfield Soul, The Guess Who (1968)
56. Les cinq saisons, Harmonium (1975)
57. Dancing in the Dragon's Jaws, Bruce Cockburn (1979)
58. Frantic City, Teenage Head (1980)
59. Hymns of the 49th Parallel, k.d. lang (2004)
60. Hot Shots, Trooper (1979)
61. Robbie Robertson, Robbie Robertson (1987)
62. The Trinity Session, Cowboy Junkies (1988)
63. Ron Sexsmith, Ron Sexsmith (1995)
64. Nothingface, Voivod (1989)
65. Come on Over, Shania Twain (1997)
66. Everything I Long For, Hayden (1995)
67. Outskirts, Blue Rodeo (1987)
68. Joyful Rebellion, k-os (2004)
69. Sit Down Young Stranger/If You Could Read My Mind, Gordon Lightfoot (1970)
70. Love Junk, The Pursuit of Happiness (1988)
71. Jaune, Jean-Pierre Ferland (1970)
72. Somewhere Outside, The Ugly Ducklings (1966)
73. Electric Jewels, April Wine (1973)
74. Sundown, Gordon Lightfoot (1974)
75. Left and Leaving, The Weakerthans (2000)
76. Clumsy, Our Lady Peace (1997)
77. Harmonium, Harmonium (1974)
78. Share the Land, The Guess Who (1970)
79. Greatest Hits, Ian & Sylvia (1970)
80. Steppenwolf, Steppenwolf (1968)
81. Ladies of the Canyon, Joni Mitchell (1970)
82. Bud the Spud and Other Favourites, Stompin' Tom Connors (1969)
83. Shine a Light, The Constantines (2003)
84. Shakespeare My Butt, The Lowest of the Low (1991)
85. Clayton Park, Thrush Hermit (1999)
86. Smeared, Sloan (1992)
87. Living Under June, Jann Arden (1994)
88. The Hissing of Summer Lawns, Joni Mitchell (1975)
89. Bad Manors, Crowbar (1971)
90. Official Music, King Biscuit Boy with Crowbar (1970)
91. Lightfoot!, Gordon Lightfoot (1966)
92. Mad Mad World, Tom Cochrane (1991)
93. Rufus Wainwright, Rufus Wainwright (1998)
94. Face to the Gale, Ron Hynes (1997)
95. Hobo's Taunt, Willie P. Bennett (1977)
96. Cowboyography, Ian Tyson (1986)
97. Favourite Colours, The Sadies (2004)
98. The Way I Feel, Gordon Lightfoot (1967)
99. A Farewell to Kings, Rush (1977)
100. We Were Born in a Flame, Sam Roberts (2004)

== See also ==
- List of number-one singles in Canada
- List of diamond-certified albums in Canada
- 50 Tracks: The Canadian Edition
