= Here Come the Wolves =

Studio album by Rheostatics
- Released: September 6, 2019
- Genre: indie rock
- Label: Six Shooter Records
- Producer: Chris Stringer

Rheostatics chronology
Brave New Waves Session (2017)	Here Come the Wolves (2019)	The Great Lakes Suite (2025)

Here Come the Wolves is an album by Rheostatics, released in 2019 on Six Shooter Records. It was their first album of new material since 2067 in 2004; it was also the band's first studio album to feature contributions from founding member Dave Clark since 1994's Introducing Happiness.

The album also features contributions from Chris Walla, Michael Phillip Wojewoda and Hugh Marsh.

The title track was released in June 2019 as the album's first single. The album also includes the song "Goodbye Sister Butterfly", a tribute to the late Gord Downie.

== Track listing ==
1. "Vancouver"
2. "AC/DC on the Stereo"
3. "Rearview"
4. "Here Come the Wolves"
5. "It's the Super Controller!"
6. "Music is the Message"
7. "Diamonds on Our Toes"
8. "I Wanna Be Your Robot"
9. "The Beautiful Night"
10. "Goodbye Sister Butterfly"
11. "Albatross"
12. "Mountains and the Sea"
