= 2067 (album) =

Studio album by Rheostatics
- Released: 2004
- Genre: Indie rock
- Label: True North

Rheostatics chronology
Night of the Shooting Stars (2001)	2067 (2004)	The Whale Music Concert, 1992 (2005)

2067 is an album by Canadian indie rock band Rheostatics. Released in 2004, it was the band's first album with longtime producer Michael Phillip Wojewoda as an official member, as well as its final studio album for 15 years. The album was billed as a concept album imagining Canada on the 200th anniversary of Canadian Confederation in 1867, although this concept is only loosely evident in the album itself.

The album was released on True North Records. It contains a hidden track which is officially billed as a "mystery song", a revamped synthpop version of one of the band's first notable singles, "Record Body Count" (from 1991's Melville).

The first single from the album was Marginalized. The second single, "The Tarleks", was loosely inspired by the character of Herb Tarlek from the 1970s sitcom WKRP in Cincinnati. Frank Bonner, who played Tarlek in the series, reprises that role in the band's music video which won a WorldFest-Houston Gold Award.

== Track listing ==
No.	Title	Writer(s)	Length
1.	"Shack in the Cornfields"	Martin Tielli	7:32
2.	"Little Bird, Little Bird"	Dave Bidini	3:57
3.	"Marginalized"	Tim Vesely	3:31
4.	"The Tarleks"	Tielli	5:23
5.	"Power Ballad for Ozzy Osbourne"	Bidini	3:39
6.	"I Dig Music (The Jazz Animal)"	Bidini	4:59
7.	"Here Comes the Image"	Vesely	6:40
8.	"Who Is That Man, And Why Is He Laughing?"	Rheostatics	5:00
9.	"The Latest Attempt on Your Life"	Tielli	2:44
10.	"Polar Bears and Trees"	Bidini	4:07
11.	"Making Progress"	Vesely	5:31
12.	"Try to Praise This Mutilated World"	Bidini	6:13
13.	"(eight seconds of silence)"		0:08
14.	"Record Body Count (Synth! Synth! Synth!)"	Rheostatics	3:29
