= On a Cold Road =

1998 book by David Bidini

On a Cold Road: Tales of Adventure in Canadian Rock
- First edition
- Author: David Bidini
- Illustrator: Martin Tielli
- Cover artist: Martin Tielli
- Language: English
- Genre: Biography
- Publisher: McClelland & Stewart
- Publication date: 1998
- Publication place: Canada
- Media type: Print (softcover)
- Pages: 429 pp (first edition)
- ISBN: 978-0-7710-1456-7
- OCLC: 39515334
- LC Class: ML419.B585A3 1998

On a Cold Road: Tales of Adventure in Canadian Rock is the first book by Rheostatics guitarist David Bidini. The book is a non-fiction account of what it's like for a Canadian rock band to be on tour. The 1998 book is published by McClelland & Stewart.

In his review Mark Jarman (of The Vancouver Sun) says that the book only scratches the surface of Canadian rock history.

== Canada Reads 2012 ==
On a Cold Road was a finalist for Canada Reads 2012. The year's theme was non-fiction Canadian books as hosted by Jian Ghomeshi. This shortlist was announced 1 November 2011. On 23 November 2011, the celebrity panelists was announced. The book was being defended by Stacey McKenzie. The winner was Something Fierce: Memoirs of a Revolutionary Daughter by Carmen Aguirre.
