= 2067 (disambiguation) =

2067 is a year in the 2060s decade.

2067 may also refer to:

- 2067 Aksnes, an outer main-belt asteroid
- 2067 (album), 2004 album by Rheostatics
- 2067 (film), 2020 Australian film
- The year 2067 BC in the 21st century BC
