= Introducing Happiness =

Studio album by Rheostatics
- Released: 1994
- Recorded: Compass Point Studios
- Genre: Indie rock
- Label: Sire
- Producer: Michael Phillip Wojewoda

Rheostatics chronology
Music from The Motion Picture Whale Music (1994)	Introducing Happiness (1994)	Music Inspired by the Group of Seven (1995)

Professional ratings
Review scores
Source	Rating
Allmusic	link

Introducing Happiness is the fifth studio album by Rheostatics, released in 1994 on Sire Records. Produced by Michael Phillip Wojewoda, the album was recorded at Compass Point Studios in the Bahamas.

Band member Dave Bidini described the album as intended to represent "a really crazy kind of thing with exploding colors like XTC's Oranges and Lemons."

The album includes "Claire", reached a peak of #52, on Canada's RPM Pop Singles/Tracks chart. That song is also featured on the Whale Music soundtrack album, and won the Genie Award for Best Original Song at the 15th Genie Awards.

Introducing Happiness was the band's second and final album for Sire Records. Sire found the band's quirky indie rock too quirky and too indie to market effectively despite having a Top 40 hit, and dropped the band from the label.

It was also Dave Clark's last album with the band. Following this album, he left to concentrate on The Dinner Is Ruined, and was replaced for the next several years by Don Kerr.

== Critical response ==
Peter Howell of the Toronto Star ranked it as the third best album of the year, behind only Nirvana's Unplugged in New York and Hole's Live Through This. He wrote that the album was "just yer basic, Etobicoke jock hoser-music psycho trip - but it wails like ginger ale. The Rheos manage the neat trick of attracting mainstream appeal without losing their alternative savvy. And "Claire" qualifies as single of the year contender."

== Track listing ==
1. "Fan Letter to Michael Jackson" (Dave Bidini, John Critchley) – 3:59
2. "Introducing Happiness" (Tim Vesely) – 2:28
3. "One More Colour" (Jane Siberry) – 3:45
4. "Claire" (Vesely, Paul Quarrington) – 4:09
5. "Digital Beach" (Martin Tielli) – 1:54
6. "Earth/Monstrous Hummingbird" (Bidini) – 4:50
7. "Row" (Vesely) – 4:52
8. "Full Moon Over Russia" (Dave Clark) – 2:19
9. "Take Me in Your Hand" (Tielli) – 3:13
10. "Jesus Was Once a Teenager Too" (Bidini, Tielli) – 4:25
11. "Me and Stupid" (Bidini) – 2:33
12. "Fish Tailin'" (Tielli) – 3:10
13. "The Woods Are Full of Cuckoos" (Bidini) – 1:16
14. "Cephallus Worm/Uncle Henry" (Tielli, Bidini) – 4:44
15. "In This Town" (Tielli) – 3:19
16. "Alomar" (Rheostatics) – 1:52
17. "You Are a Treasure" (Tielli) – 3:22
18. "Onilley's Strange Dream" (Bidini, Tielli) – 6:26

== Chart performance ==
Chart (1994)	Peak position
Canada Top Albums (RPM)	44
