= Ida Nilsen =

Canadian musician

- Also known as: Great Aunt Ida
- Origin: Vancouver, British Columbia, Canada
- Genres: Indie pop
- Occupations: Musician, songwriter
- Labels: Northern Electric, Zunior, Hive-fi, Dead House Plant
- Members: Barry Mirochnick; Mark Haney
- Past members: Ryan Granville-Martin; Tim Vesely; Dan Goldman; Ben Bowen; Marshall Bureau; Jonathan Anderson; JP Carter; Annie Wilkinson; Scott Malin
- Website: www.greatauntida.com

Ida Nilsen is a Canadian indie pop singer-songwriter and musician. She has been a member of the bands Radiogram, The Violet Archers, The Beans, The Gay, The Buttless Chaps and The Choir Practice, and has appeared as a guest musician on albums by P:ano, Jerk With a Bomb, Montag, and Veda Hille.

She formed her own band, Great Aunt Ida, in 2003. That band released its debut album, Our Fall, in 2005. Great Aunt Ida's second album How They Fly was released at the Railway Club in Vancouver on September 21, 2006. In a favourable review, critic Jennifer Van Evra wrote, "the album's simultaneously warm and spare arrangements give it an understated power".

In August 2007, Nilsen moved from Vancouver to Toronto. She resided there settling in Parkdale writing the songs that were to become "Nuclearize Me", which Now Magazine described as "Reminiscent of Belle & Sebastian's fuller late-period material, it's steady and sure, intimate and honest, with songs that are so damn smartly crafted", recorded with Dave Draves at Little Bullhorn Studios in Ottawa. In 2012, Nilsen moved to Detroit, Michigan, where she lived until 2015 when she moved back to Vancouver.

In 2021, she released Unsayable, her fourth album and her first in a decade.

== Discography ==
- Our Fall (2005)
- How They Fly (2006)
- Nuclearize Me (2011)
- Unsayable (2021)
