= The Blue Hysteria =

Studio album by Rheostatics
- Released: 1996
- Recorded: at Metalworks Studios in Mississauga, Ontario
- Genre: Indie rock

Rheostatics chronology
Music Inspired by the Group of Seven (1995)	The Blue Hysteria (1996)	Double Live (1997)

Professional ratings
Review scores
Source	Rating
Allmusic	link

The Blue Hysteria is a 1996 album by Rheostatics.

"Bad Time to Be Poor", a protest song about life in Ontario during the government of Mike Harris, was the album's first single. The band also contributed this song to the compilation album GASCD in 2001 to support citizen media and social justice groups in protesting the Quebec City Summit of the Americas.

To support the album, the band were invited on tour as the opening act for The Tragically Hip. At the beginning of the Hip's 1997 live album Live Between Us, singer Gordon Downie acknowledges the Rheostatics, and towards the end of the album, Downie works a verse from "Bad Time to Be Poor" into "Nautical Disaster".

The 1997 Rheostatics album Double Live also partially documents the band's tour with the Hip.

"Bad Time to Be Poor" was covered by The Weakerthans on the 2007 Rheostatics tribute album The Secret Sessions. Their version reached #1 on CBC Radio 3's R3-30 chart.

== Track listing ==
All songs are credited to the full band.

1. "All the Same Eyes" – 3:53
2. "Motorino" – 4:01
3. "Something the Committee Thought You Should Hear" – 0:34
4. "Fat" – 6:56
5. "To Catch a Thief" – 0:11
6. "Bad Time to Be Poor" – 4:56
7. "Sweet, Rich, Beautiful, Mine" – 4:03
8. "Four Little Songs" – 5:52
9. "An Offer" – 4:33
10. "Never Forget" – 4:54
11. "The Idiot" – 3:38
12. "Connecting Flights" – 2:46
13. "Feed Yourself" – 6:18
14. "The 'You Are Very Star' Journey" – 1:12
15. "A Midwinter Night's Dream" – 8:22
16. "My First Rock Concert" (hidden track) – 4:09
