= Peppermint (EP) =

EP by Sloan
- Released: August 1, 1992; May 25, 2024 (Vinyl)
- Recorded: 1991
- Genre: Indie rock
- Length: 22:50
- Label: Murderecords
- Producer: Terry Pulliam, Sloan

Sloan chronology
Peppermint (1992)	Smeared (1992)

Peppermint EP is the debut EP released by Canadian rock band Sloan. It was released on their own label, Murderecords, in 1992.

The EP was recorded at Sound Market Studios in Halifax, Nova Scotia, Canada by Terry Pulliam, who also engineered the recording.

Three songs – "Marcus Said", "Underwhelmed", and "Sugartune" – were also included on the band's first full-length album, Smeared; "Underwhelmed" was entirely re-recorded, while "Marcus Said" and "Sugartune" were remixed versions of the original Peppermint recordings.

Jennifer Pierce of Jale provides additional backing vocals on two songs, "Marcus Said" and "Torn".

The cover is a photo of Jason Larsen, a friend of the band's, after whom the band is named. Larsen was originally called "Slow One" by his French-speaking boss, a nickname which, when said in the boss' French accent, sounded more like "Sloan". Larsen agreed they could name the band after him as long as he was on the cover of their first album.

== Track listing ==
1. "Marcus Said" (Chris Murphy) – 4:34
2. "Underwhelmed" (Chris Murphy) – 5:25
3. "Pretty Voice" (Jay Ferguson) – 3:08
4. "Lucky for Me" (Chris Murphy) – 3:11
5. "Sugartune" (Patrick Pentland) – 3:37
6. "Torn" (Chris Murphy) – 2:55

== Credits ==
- Jay Ferguson – Guitar, vocals
- Chris Murphy – Bass, vocals
- Patrick Pentland – Guitar, vocals
- Andrew Scott – Drums, vocals
- Jennifer Pierce – vocals ("Marcus Said" and "Torn")
