= Wendel Clark =

Canadian ice hockey player (born 1966)

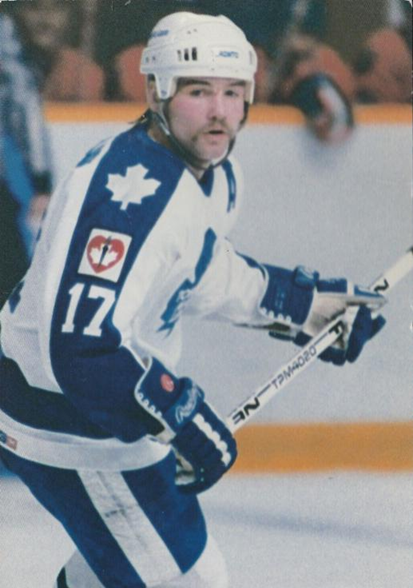
- Clark with the Toronto Maple Leafs in 1988
- Born: October 25, 1966 (age 60) Kelvington, Saskatchewan, Canada
- Height: 5 ft 11 in (180 cm)
- Weight: 197 lb (89 kg; 14 st 1 lb)
- Position: Left wing / Defence
- Shot: Left
- Played for: Toronto Maple Leafs; Quebec Nordiques; New York Islanders; Tampa Bay Lightning; Detroit Red Wings; Chicago Blackhawks
- National team: Canada
- NHL draft: 1st overall, 1985; Toronto Maple Leafs
- Playing career: 1985–2000
Medal record
Representing Canada
Men's ice hockey
World Junior Championships
Gold medal – first place	1985 Finland

Wendel Lee Clark (born October 25, 1966) is a Canadian former professional ice hockey player. His professional career lasted from 1985 until 2000, during which time he played for the Toronto Maple Leafs, Quebec Nordiques, New York Islanders, Tampa Bay Lightning, Detroit Red Wings and Chicago Blackhawks. He was chosen first overall in the 1985 NHL entry draft by the Maple Leafs, the team he played with on three occasions, captaining the team from 1991 to 1994. Clark is a fan favourite in Toronto, continuing to represent the Maple Leafs at public events. He is considered one of the best power forwards in NHL history.

== Playing career ==
=== Junior ===
A star junior hockey defenceman with the Saskatoon Blades of the Western Hockey League, Clark was a member of Canada's gold medal-winning team at the 1985 World Junior Ice Hockey Championships.

=== Toronto Maple Leafs (1985–1994) ===
Clark was converted to forward after he was selected first overall by the Toronto Maple Leafs in the 1985 NHL entry draft. Clark was known for his physical play and his offensive mind combined with scoring prowess. As tough as Clark was, his scoring touch and offensive ability was equal to his on-ice toughness. Clark's 227 PIM in his rookie season was the 1985–86 Toronto Maple Leafs team-high, along with 34 goals which also led the team. After his rookie season, he was named to the NHL All-Rookie Team and finished second in voting for the Calder Memorial Trophy, (behind Gary Suter of the Calgary Flames).

Clark was named captain of the team for the 1991–92 season. During the 1992–93 season, Clark's second year captaining the team, the Leafs set team records in wins (44) and points (99) and also made the playoffs for the first time in three years. The Leafs had a memorable run to the Campbell Conference Finals, but after leading the best-of-seven series three games to two coming within one game of advancing to the Stanley Cup Finals, they lost to the Wayne Gretzky-led Los Angeles Kings, who were coached by Clark's cousin, Barry Melrose.

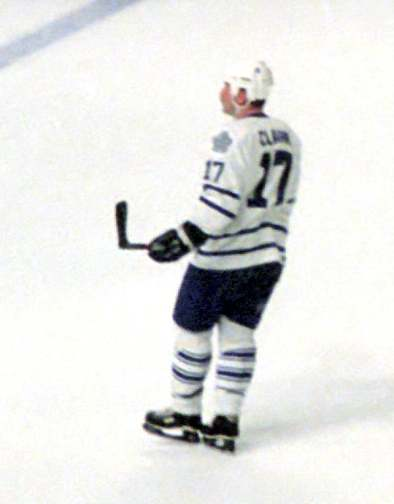
Clark with the Maple Leafs in 1994

Two career-defining moments happened in this series for Clark: his toe-to-toe fight in Game 1 of the series with enforcer Marty McSorley in retribution for a big hit McSorley made on Leafs star Doug Gilmour, and his hat-trick in Game Six of the seven-game series. "That series was probably the most excitement I saw around here," proclaimed Clark, who had a legendary series performance with 20 points (10 goals and 10 assists) in his 21 games during the '93 playoffs. "It was the furthest the Leafs had advanced in a long time, the team was coming together at the right time and everybody was doing their jobs."

Clark managed a career-high 46 goals in 64 games for the Leafs during the 1993–94 season, playing on a line with Dave Andreychuk and Doug Gilmour. In the playoffs, the Leafs made a second consecutive trip to the Conference Finals but fell 4–1 to the Vancouver Canucks, who were coached by future Leafs coach Pat Quinn.

=== Trades, return to Toronto and later years (1994–2000) ===
In June 1994, with his value at an all-time high, Clark was traded to the Quebec Nordiques in a multi-player deal that notably involved a young Mats Sundin. He was succeeded as Maple Leafs captain by Gilmour. Clark played the lockout-shortened 1994–95 NHL season in Quebec.

After the Nordiques became the Colorado Avalanche, Clark became embroiled in a contract dispute with the team. As a result, shortly before the beginning of the 1995–96 campaign, he was sent to the New York Islanders in a three-way trade that brought Claude Lemieux to Colorado and Steve Thomas to the New Jersey Devils. Clark played 58 games with the Islanders but finished the season back in Toronto. The Islanders received a first-round pick from the Leafs (4th overall in 1997) which turned out to be Roberto Luongo.

In 1998 Clark signed as a free agent with the Tampa Bay Lightning, where he earned a spot on the North American All-Star team and went on to score 28 goals in 65 games. Despite his success in Tampa Bay, he was dealt at the trade deadline to the Detroit Red Wings, where he finished the 1998–99 season. Clark signed with the Chicago Blackhawks later in 1999 but only appeared in 13 games with the team.

Upon returning to the Leafs in 2000, after being benched by the Blackhawks, Clark was not particularly effective for the remainder of the regular season, but he found his form for the Leafs' playoff run. Leaf fans gave their former captain a 90-second standing ovation after Clark barreled into the New Jersey Devils zone and hit the post in Game 1. During Game 4, Clark assisted on the game-winning goal that gave the Leafs a 2–1 victory and tied the series with the Devils.

Clark announced his retirement on June 29, 2000.

== Post-retirement ==
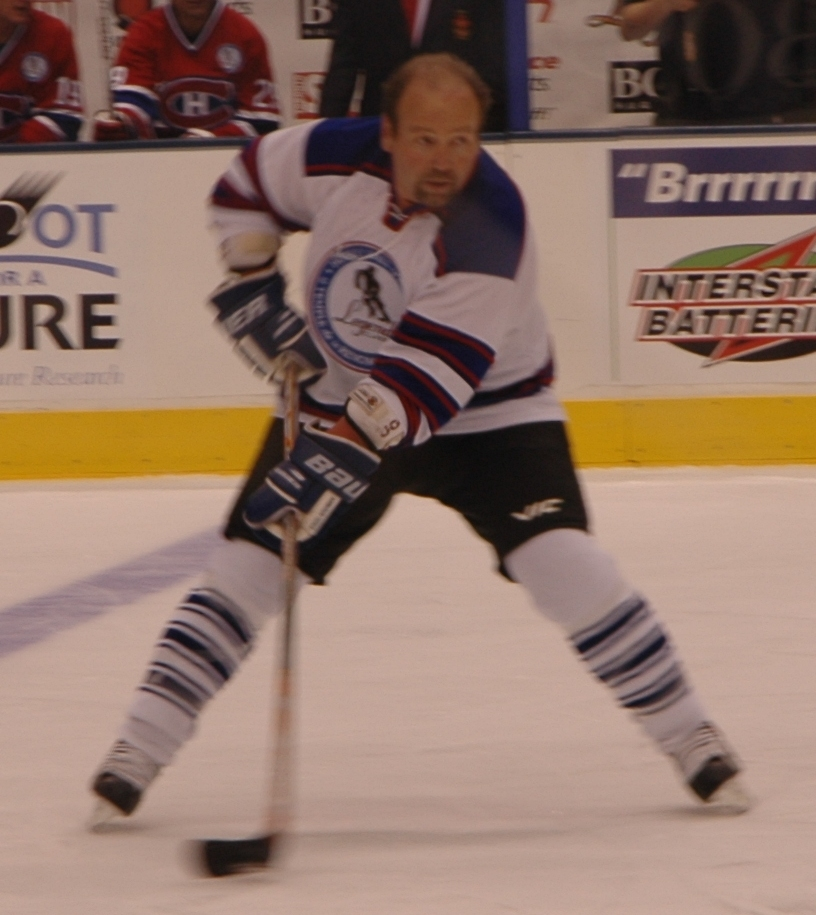
Clark in 2008

Clark is now employed by the Toronto Maple Leafs Hockey Club as a community ambassador in public relations. He can be seen at virtually all Leaf home games, usually with his wife Denise and children. The Toronto Maple Leafs honoured the former captain by raising his legendary number 17 to the rafters on November 22, 2008, at the Air Canada Centre. The number was officially retired by the team on October 15, 2016, during a home pre-game ceremony in which 17 players representing 11 sweater numbers were similarly honoured. Prior to the Leafs' Hockey Day in Canada game against the Ottawa Senators on Saturday, February 18, 2017, it was announced that statues of iconic Leafs Charlie Conacher, Red Kelly, Frank Mahovlich and Clark would be added to the Leafs' Legends Row, located outside the Air Canada Centre, as part of the ongoing Maple Leafs' Centennial Anniversary.

He owns Wendel Clark's Classic Grill and Sports Lounge, with two restaurants in Saskatoon, Saskatchewan; and Oshawa, Ontario. A new location in Grand Prairie, Alberta will open soon. He resides in King City.

== Personal life ==
=== Family ===
Clark's first cousin is ex-NHLer and ESPN commentator Barry Melrose; he is also a cousin of former Detroit Red Wing and Saskatoon Blades player Joe Kocur.

Clark's younger brother Kerry Clark was also a professional hockey player; he was a career minor leaguer who is in the top 60 in minor league history in penalty minutes with 2812. Clark's other brother, Donn Clark, is best known for being the head coach of the Prince Albert Raiders and the Saskatoon Blades.

Clark's son, Kody, played three seasons for the Ottawa 67's of the Ontario Hockey League beginning in 2016. Kody was selected 47th overall in the 2018 NHL entry draft by the Washington Capitals, and played three seasons for the Hershey Bears.

== In popular culture ==
Though it was released very early in his career, arguably before he became well known as a player, Clark was celebrated by the Canadian band The Rheostatics in the song "The Ballad of Wendel Clark Parts I & II" on their debut album, Greatest Hits.

== Awards ==
- WHL East First All-Star Team – 1985
- Selected to two NHL All-Star Games: 1986 and 1999
- NHL All-Rookie Team – 1986
- Inducted into the Ontario Sports Hall of Fame in 2011.
- #17 jersey retired by the Toronto Maple Leafs.

== Career statistics ==
=== Regular season and playoffs ===
			Regular season					Playoffs
Season	Team	League	GP	G	A	Pts	PIM	GP	G	A	Pts	PIM
1983–84	Saskatoon Blades	WHL	72	23	45	68	225	—	—	—	—	—
1984–85	Saskatoon Blades	WHL	64	32	55	87	253	3	3	3	6	7
1985–86	Toronto Maple Leafs	NHL	66	34	11	45	227	10	5	1	6	47
1986–87	Toronto Maple Leafs	NHL	80	37	23	60	271	13	6	5	11	38
1987–88	Toronto Maple Leafs	NHL	28	12	11	23	80	—	—	—	—	—
1988–89	Toronto Maple Leafs	NHL	15	7	4	11	66	—	—	—	—	—
1989–90	Toronto Maple Leafs	NHL	38	18	8	26	116	5	1	1	2	19
1990–91	Toronto Maple Leafs	NHL	63	18	16	34	152	—	—	—	—	—
1991–92	Toronto Maple Leafs	NHL	43	19	21	40	123	—	—	—	—	—
1992–93	Toronto Maple Leafs	NHL	66	17	22	39	193	21	10	10	20	51
1993–94	Toronto Maple Leafs	NHL	64	46	30	76	115	18	9	7	16	24
1994–95	Quebec Nordiques	NHL	37	12	18	30	45	6	1	2	3	6
1995–96	New York Islanders	NHL	58	24	19	43	60	—	—	—	—	—
1995–96	Toronto Maple Leafs	NHL	13	8	7	15	16	6	2	2	4	2
1996–97	Toronto Maple Leafs	NHL	65	30	19	49	75	—	—	—	—	—
1997–98	Toronto Maple Leafs	NHL	47	12	7	19	80	—	—	—	—	—
1998–99	Tampa Bay Lightning	NHL	65	28	14	42	35	—	—	—	—	—
1998–99	Detroit Red Wings	NHL	12	4	2	6	2	10	2	3	5	10
1999–2000	Chicago Blackhawks	NHL	13	2	0	2	13	—	—	—	—	—
1999–2000	Toronto Maple Leafs	NHL	20	2	2	4	21	6	1	1	2	4
NHL totals			793	330	234	564	1,690	95	37	32	69	201

=== International ===
Year	Team	Event	GP	G	A	Pts	PIM
1985	Canada	WJC	7	3	2	5	10

== See also ==
- Captain (ice hockey)
- Notable families in the NHL

Preceded by Mario Lemieux	NHL first overall draft pick 1985	Succeeded by Joe Murphy
Preceded by Al Iafrate	Toronto Maple Leafs first-round draft pick 1985	Succeeded by Vincent Damphousse
Preceded by Rob Ramage	Toronto Maple Leafs captain 1991–94	Succeeded by Doug Gilmour
