= Underwhelmed =

Single by Sloan

from the album Smeared
- Released: 1992 (CAN); 1993 (U.S.)
- Genre: Alternative rock
- Length: 4:45
- Label: Geffen Records, Murderecords
- Songwriters: Chris Murphy, Sloan

Sloan singles chronology
| "Underwhelmed" (1992) | "Sugartune" (1992) |

Alternative Cover
- Cover of UK Version

Music video
- "Underwhelmed" on YouTube

"Underwhelmed" is the debut single by Canadian alternative rock band Sloan. The song was originally released on the DTK Records compilation Hear and Now '92: The Best Of The East Coast's Independent in 1992 and was later included on the band's debut EP, Peppermint. A music video was released of the Peppermint version. The song was re-recorded for the band's debut full-length album, Smeared, and was released as the album's lead single. The song is the band's best-charted single outside Canada, peaking at #25 on the Modern Rock Tracks chart in 1993.

Sloan's Chris Murphy says the song's lyrical approach was influenced by "Political Song for Michael Jackson to Sing", a song by Minutemen on their 1984 album, Double Nickels on the Dime.

== Legacy ==
In 1996, 2000, and 2005, the music magazine Chart conducted reader polls to determine the best Canadian songs of all time, in which Underwhelmed was voted the second greatest Canadian song of all time. In 2007, CFNY-FM ranked the song #1 on their list of Top 102 Canadian New Rock Songs.

== Track listing ==
=== UK version ===
A-side:

1. "Underwhelmed" – 4:46
2. "What's There to Decide?" – 4:21

B-side:

1. "Amped" – 3:03
2. "Sleepover" – 8:05
