= The Violet Archers =

Canadian indie pop band

- Origin: Toronto, Ontario, Canada
- Genres: Indie pop
- Years active: 2005–present
- Label: Northern Electric
- Members: Tim Vesely; Jane Gowan
- Past members: Aaron MacPherson; Steve Pitkin; Yawd Sylvester; Camille Giroux; Ida Nilsen; Scott Remila
- Website: thevioletarchers.com

The Violet Archers is a Canadian indie pop band from Toronto. Led by Rheostatics bassist Tim Vesely, the band currently consists of Vesely and singer-songwriter Jane Gowan, with past members including Yawd Sylvester on guitar, drummer Camille Giroux, bassist Scott Remila, Ida Nilsen on piano.

== History ==
The Violet Archers were founded by Vesely as a side project while he was performing with the Rheostatics; he gave the band its name after hearing one of Canadian composer Violet Archer's compositions played on CBC Radio.

The Violet Archers released their debut album, The End of Part One, in 2005 on Northern Electric Records. and as a digital download through Zunior Records. Musicians contributing to the album included Aaron MacPherson and Steve Pitkin. By Divine Right's José Miguel Contreras also appears as a guest musician on several tracks. The band's second album, Sunshine at Night, was released in 2008 following Vesely's departure from Rheostatics.

Nilsen also has her own band, Great Aunt Ida, in which Vesely also plays.

After a substantial hiatus during which Vesely mostly worked as a recording engineer and producer rather than recording his own new music, the release of the Rheostatics reunion album Here Come the Wolves in 2019 drew Vesely back into songwriting with the release of several new standalone singles beginning in 2021, including a duet with Sarah Harmer titled "Animal Song". In November 2025, Vesely released The Duo Sessions, an album of songs from both the Violet Archers and Rheostatics performed in acoustic rerecordings by Vesely and Jane Gowan.

== Discography ==
=== Albums ===
- The End of Part One (2005)
- Sunshine at Night (2008)
- The Duo Sessions (2025)

=== Singles ===
- "Keep It in the Ground" b/w "Quiet This Morning" (2021)
- "Animal Song" b/w "Nobody Knows" (2023)
- "Any Sense of Time" (2024)

=== Compilation inclusions ===
- Our Power (2006): "You and I"
