= Chart Attack =

Defunct Canadian music magazine

- Categories: Music
- Publisher: Channel Zero
- Founded: 1991
- Final issue: 2009
- Country: Canada
- Based in: Toronto
- Language: English
- ISSN: 1198-7235

Chart Attack (stylized as CHARTattack) was a Canadian online music publication. Formerly a monthly print magazine, it was called Chart and published from 1991 to 2009. Online content ceased to be updated sometime between mid 2017 to 2019, after which owner Channel Zero laid off the site's staff. The site's content is no longer available live online, the domain has been taken over by a usurping commercial website unrelated to music. Much of the old content is still available as web archives at the Wayback Machine.

== History and profile ==
Launched in 1991 as National Chart, the magazine was started by York University students Edward Skira and Nada Laskovski as a tipsheet and airplay chart for campus radio stations in Canada. The magazine soon grew to include interviews, CD reviews and other features. National Chart was considered an internal publication for the National Campus and Community Radio Association, Canada's association of campus radio stations, and was not available as a newsstand title.

When Skira and Laskovski graduated, they incorporated Chart as an independent magazine, and began to pursue national newsstand distribution. Although it was no longer an NCRA publication, many campus radio stations continued to file airplay reports for the magazine's Top 50 chart even though its status as the official NCRA chart was transferred to the new publication !earshot.

The magazine's primary focus was Canadian alternative rock and indie rock, although they profiled important international acts, and rap and pop music acts as well. At its peak, the magazine had a press run of 40,000 copies per issue, making it the largest paid circulation music magazine in Canada in its era.

The magazine ceased publishing a print edition in 2009, continuing as a web-only publication. The website briefly suspended publication in summer 2011, but its acquisition by andPOP, a Canadian entertainment news website, was announced on November 1, 2011. In 2013, andPop was in turn acquired by Channel Zero.

The site laid off its staff in 2017.

== Reader polls ==
In 1996, 2000 and 2005, the magazine conducted polls of readers, musicians and music industry professionals to determine the 50 best Canadian albums and songs of all time. There were 25 albums and 18 songs which ranked in the top 50 in all three polls.

=== Top 50 albums ===
Rank	1996	2000	2005
1	Sloan, Twice Removed	Joni Mitchell, Blue	Sloan, Twice Removed
2	Neil Young, Harvest	Neil Young, Harvest	Neil Young, Harvest
3	Joni Mitchell, Blue	Sloan, Twice Removed	Joni Mitchell, Blue
4	The Tragically Hip, Up to Here	Rheostatics, Whale Music	Broken Social Scene, You Forgot It in People
5	Rheostatics, Whale Music	Rheostatics, Melville	Neil Young, After the Gold Rush
6	The Tragically Hip, Fully Completely	The Lowest of the Low, Shakespeare My Butt	The Weakerthans, Left and Leaving
7	Neil Young, After the Gold Rush	Sarah McLachlan, Fumbling Towards Ecstasy	The Lowest of the Low, Shakespeare My Butt
8	The Band, Music from Big Pink	Rush, Moving Pictures	The Tragically Hip, Fully Completely
9	Cowboy Junkies, The Trinity Session	Sloan, One Chord to Another	The Band, The Band
10	The Lowest of the Low, Shakespeare My Butt	The Tragically Hip, Fully Completely	Rheostatics, Whale Music
11	Sarah McLachlan, Fumbling Towards Ecstasy	The Band, The Band	k-os, Joyful Rebellion
12	Neil Young, Rust Never Sleeps	Neil Young, After the Gold Rush	The New Pornographers, Mass Romantic
13	k. d. lang, Ingenue	The Tragically Hip, Day for Night	Sloan, One Chord to Another
14	Neil Young, Tonight's the Night	Mary Margaret O'Hara, Miss America	The Band, Music from Big Pink
15	Rush, Moving Pictures	Daniel Lanois, Acadie	Rush, 2112
16	Rheostatics, Melville	Neil Young, Rust Never Sleeps	Sloan, Smeared
17	Slow, Against the Glass	Change of Heart, Smile	Arcade Fire, Funeral
18	Sloan, Smeared	Matthew Good Band, Underdogs	Rush, Moving Pictures
19	Leonard Cohen, I'm Your Man	The Tragically Hip, Road Apples	Sarah McLachlan, Fumbling Towards Ecstasy
20	Nomeansno, Wrong	The Band, Music from Big Pink	Leonard Cohen, Songs of Love and Hate
21	Teenage Head, Frantic City	Sloan, Smeared	The Tragically Hip, Day for Night
22	The Band, The Band	The Tragically Hip, Up to Here	Blue Rodeo, Five Days in July
23	Neil Young, Everybody Knows This Is Nowhere	Joni Mitchell, Court and Spark	Hayden, Everything I Long For
24	Sarah McLachlan, Solace	Neil Young, Everybody Knows This Is Nowhere	Neil Young, Everybody Knows This Is Nowhere
25	Mary Margaret O'Hara, Miss America	Rush, 2112	Metric, Old World Underground, Where Are You Now?
26	Sons of Freedom, Sons of Freedom	Neil Young, Tonight's the Night	Eric's Trip, Love Tara
27	Blue Rodeo, Outskirts	The Grapes of Wrath, Now and Again	Constantines, Shine a Light
28	Doughboys, Whatever	Rufus Wainwright, Rufus Wainwright	The Guess Who, American Woman
29	Daniel Lanois, Acadie	Blue Rodeo, Five Days in July	Neil Young, Rust Never Sleeps
30	The Inbreds, Kombinator	Alanis Morissette, Jagged Little Pill	Constantines, Constantines
31	Hayden, Everything I Long For	Daniel Lanois, For the Beauty of Wynona	Thrush Hermit, Clayton Park
32	The Pursuit of Happiness, Love Junk	Leonard Cohen, Songs of Leonard Cohen	The Tragically Hip, Up to Here
33	The Guess Who, American Woman	Sloan, Navy Blues	The Super Friendz, Mock Up, Scale Down
34	Blue Rodeo, Five Days in July	The Guess Who, American Woman	Nomeansno, Wrong
35	Eric's Trip, Love Tara	Bran Van 3000, Glee	Sarah Harmer, You Were Here
36	Skinny Puppy, Bites	Cowboy Junkies, The Trinity Session	Blue Rodeo, Outskirts
37	The Tragically Hip, Day for Night	Eric's Trip, Love Tara	Sam Roberts, We Were Born in a Flame
38	Nomeansno, Sex Mad	Barenaked Ladies, Gordon	Billy Talent, Billy Talent
39	Spirit of the West, Save This House	I Mother Earth, Dig	Neil Young, Tonight's the Night
40	54-40, 54-40	Sianspheric, Somnium	Bryan Adams, Reckless
41	Change of Heart, Smile	54-40, 54-40	Sloan, Navy Blues
42	Art Bergmann, Sexual Roulette	Moist, Silver	Leonard Cohen, Songs of Leonard Cohen
43	Rush, 2112	Nomeansno, Wrong	Feist, Let It Die
44	Joni Mitchell, Court and Spark	Godspeed You Black Emperor!, Slow Riot for New Zero Kanada	Rheostatics, Melville
45	Leonard Cohen, Songs of Leonard Cohen	Our Lady Peace, Clumsy	Rufus Wainwright, Rufus Wainwright
46	Teenage Head, Teenage Head	Godspeed You Black Emperor!, F♯ A♯ ∞	Cowboy Junkies, The Trinity Session
47	The Grapes of Wrath, Now and Again	Bryan Adams, Reckless	Alanis Morissette, Jagged Little Pill
48	Simply Saucer, Cyborgs Revisited	Blue Rodeo, Outskirts	Death from Above 1979, You're a Woman, I'm a Machine
49	The Tragically Hip, Road Apples	Sarah McLachlan, Surfacing	Our Lady Peace, Clumsy
50	13 Engines, Perpetual Motion Machine	Blue Rodeo, Casino	Matthew Good Band, Beautiful Midnight

=== Top 50 songs ===
Rank	1996	2000	2005
1	The Demics, "New York City"	The Guess Who, "American Woman"	The Guess Who, "American Woman"
2	Sloan, "Underwhelmed"	Sloan, "Underwhelmed"	Sloan, "Underwhelmed"
3	The Guess Who, "American Woman"	Gordon Lightfoot, "If You Could Read My Mind"	Neil Young, "The Needle and the Damage Done"
4	The Pursuit of Happiness, "I'm an Adult Now"	Bryan Adams, "Summer of '69"	Gordon Lightfoot, "The Wreck of the Edmund Fitzgerald"
5	Martha and the Muffins, "Echo Beach"	Gordon Lightfoot, "The Wreck of the Edmund Fitzgerald"	Bryan Adams, "Summer of '69"
6	Bachman–Turner Overdrive, "Takin' Care of Business"	The Pursuit of Happiness, "I'm An Adult Now"	Rush, "Tom Sawyer"
7	Blue Rodeo, "Try"	The Tragically Hip, "New Orleans Is Sinking"	The Band, "The Weight"
8	Treble Charger, "Red"	The Diodes, "Tired of Waking Up Tired"	Neil Young, "Cortez the Killer"
9	Rush, "Tom Sawyer"	The Demics, "New York City"	Neil Young, "Heart of Gold"
10	Slow, "Have Not Been the Same"	Neil Young, "Cinnamon Girl"	Leonard Cohen, "Hallelujah"
11	Neil Young, "Cinnamon Girl"	Maestro Fresh Wes, "Let Your Backbone Slide"	Neil Young, "Rockin' in the Free World"
12	The Tragically Hip, "New Orleans Is Sinking"	Sloan, "Money City Maniacs"	Maestro Fresh Wes, "Let Your Backbone Slide"
13	Neil Young, "Rockin' in the Free World"	Slow, "Have Not Been the Same"	Gordon Lightfoot, "If You Could Read My Mind"
14	The Band, "The Weight"	Blue Rodeo, "Try"	The Tragically Hip, "New Orleans Is Sinking"
15	Gordon Lightfoot, "If You Could Read My Mind"	Neil Young, "The Needle and the Damage Done"	Payola$, "Eyes of a Stranger"
16	Payola$, "Eyes of a Stranger"	Joni Mitchell, "Big Yellow Taxi"	Neil Young, "Cinnamon Girl"
17	The Diodes, "Tired of Waking Up Tired"	Rush, "Tom Sawyer"	Joni Mitchell, "A Case of You"
18	k. d. lang, "Constant Craving"	Rough Trade, "High School Confidential"	Leonard Cohen, "Suzanne"
19	Men Without Hats, "The Safety Dance"	Neil Young, "Rockin' in the Free World"	The Weakerthans, "Left and Leaving"
20	Skinny Puppy, "Dig It"	Martha and the Muffins, "Echo Beach"	Sloan, "Coax Me"
21	Young Canadians, "Hawaii"	Sloan, "Coax Me"	The Band, "The Night They Drove Old Dixie Down"
22	Rough Trade, "High School Confidential"	Trooper, "Raise a Little Hell"	Blue Rodeo, "Hasn't Hit Me Yet"
23	Gordon Lightfoot, "The Wreck of the Edmund Fitzgerald"	The Tragically Hip, "At the Hundredth Meridian"	Leonard Cohen, "Famous Blue Raincoat"
24	Bryan Adams, "Summer of '69"	The Tragically Hip, "Courage (for Hugh MacLennan)"	Rush, "Closer to the Heart"
25	Leonard Cohen, "Suzanne"	Rheostatics, "Record Body Count"	Stompin' Tom Connors, "The Hockey Song"
26	Doughboys, "Shine"	Len, "Steal My Sunshine"	Neil Young, "Down by the River"
27	Five Man Electrical Band, "Signs"	The Tragically Hip, "Grace, Too"	Gordon Lightfoot, "Canadian Railroad Trilogy"
28	Ian and Sylvia, "Four Strong Winds"	54-40, "One Gun"	Bachman–Turner Overdrive, "Takin' Care of Business"
29	Sloan, "Coax Me"	Bachman–Turner Overdrive, "Takin' Care of Business"	The Guess Who, "No Sugar Tonight/New Mother Nature"
30	Neil Young, "Heart of Gold"	Rufus Wainwright, "April Fool's"	Sloan, "Snowsuit Sound"
31	A Foot in Coldwater, "Make Me Do (Anything You Want)"	Payola$, "Eyes of a Stranger"	Treble Charger, "Red"
32	Anne Murray, "Snowbird"	Sweeney Todd, "Roxy Roller"	Bruce Cockburn, "Lovers in a Dangerous Time"
33	Crowbar, "Oh, What a Feeling"	Spirit of the West, "Political"	k-os, "Man I Used to Be"
34	The Viletones, "Screaming Fist"	Anne Murray, "Snowbird"	The Pursuit of Happiness, "I'm an Adult Now"
35	54-40, "I Go Blind"	The Tragically Hip, "Ahead by a Century"	Sloan, "The Good in Everyone"
36	Terry Jacks, "Seasons in the Sun"	Gordon Lightfoot, "Sundown"	Hayden, "Bad As They Seem"
37	Spirit of the West, "Political"	Shadowy Men on a Shadowy Planet, "Having an Average Weekend"	Joni Mitchell, "Big Yellow Taxi"
38	The Haunted, "1-2-5"	Doughboys, "Shine"	Neil Young, "Cowgirl in the Sand"
39	The Ugly Ducklings, "Nothin'"	Leonard Cohen, "Suzanne"	Rush, "Limelight"
40	Slow, "I Broke the Circle"	Sarah McLachlan, "Vox"	Blue Rodeo, "Five Days in May"
41	Andy Kim, "Rock Me Gently"	54-40, "Baby Ran"	Sloan, "Everything You've Done Wrong"
42	The Stampeders, "Sweet City Woman"	Blue Rodeo, "Diamond Mine"	Blue Rodeo, "Try"
43	Gordon Lightfoot, "Sundown"	The Grapes of Wrath, "All the Things I Wasn't"	The Guess Who, "These Eyes"
44	Tom Cochrane, "Life Is a Highway"	Leonard Cohen, "So Long Marianne"	Rheostatics, "Horses"
45	The Grapes of Wrath, "All the Things I Wasn't"	Neil Young, "Heart of Gold"	Alexisonfire, "Accidents"
46	The Guess Who, "These Eyes"	Spoons, "Nova Heart"	The New Pornographers, "Mass Romantic"
47	Cowboy Junkies, "Sweet Jane"	Joni Mitchell, "A Case of You"	Sam Roberts, "Hard Road"
48	Sweeney Todd, "Roxy Roller"	Stompin' Tom Connors, "The Hockey Song"	Neil Young, "Only Love Can Break Your Heart"
49	Sarah McLachlan, "The Path of Thorns (Terms)"	The Tragically Hip, "Locked in the Trunk of a Car"	Rufus Wainwright, "April Fool's"
50	Joni Mitchell, "Big Yellow Taxi"	The Ugly Ducklings, "Nothin'"	The Ugly Ducklings, "Nothin'"
