= Liz Howard (writer) =

Canadian writer

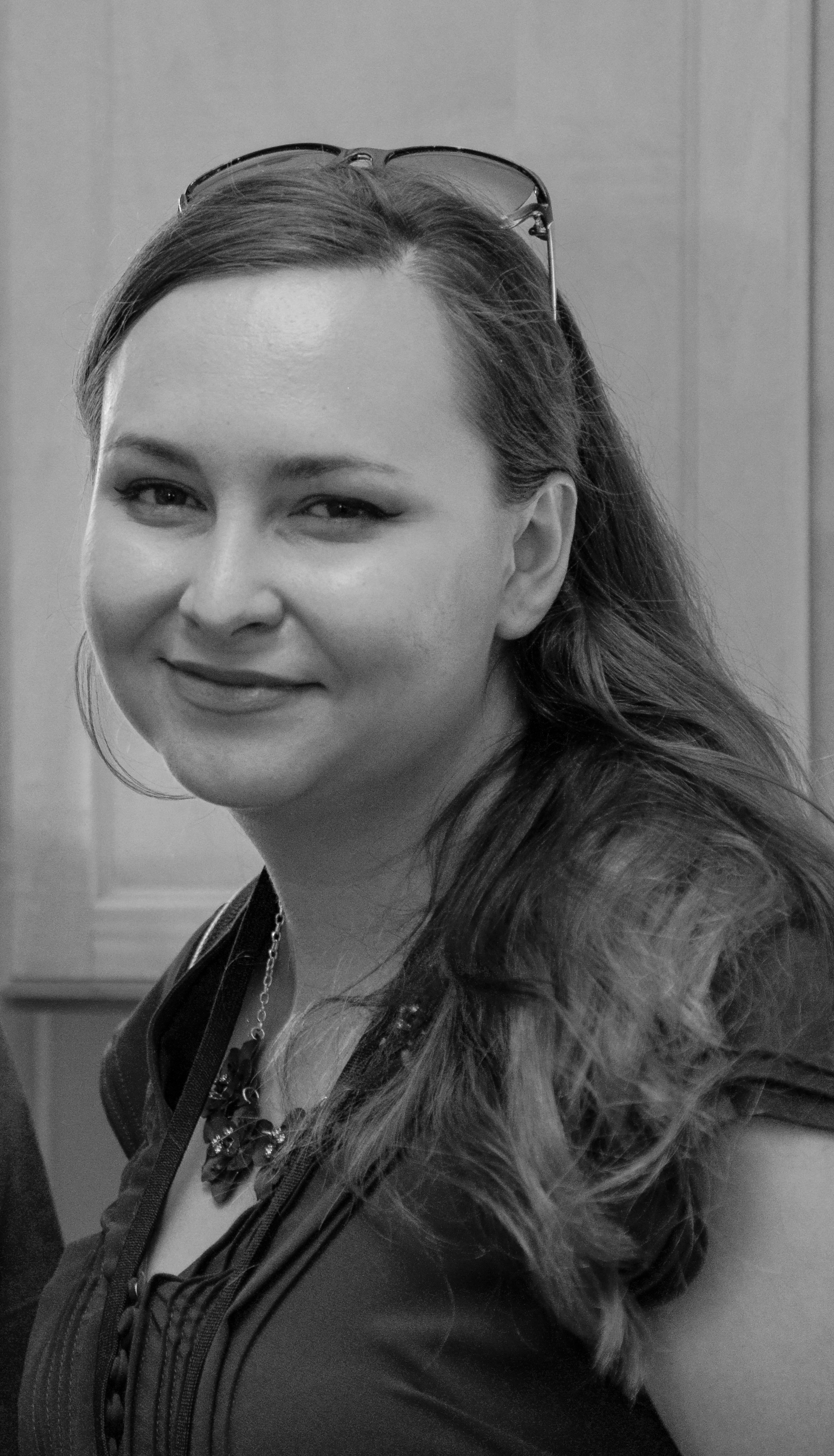
- Howard at the Eden Mills Writers' Festival in 2016

Liz Howard is a Canadian writer and academic. Her debut poetry collection, Infinite Citizen of the Shaking Tent, was a shortlisted nominee for the Governor General's Award for English-language poetry at the 2015 Governor General's Awards, and winner of the 2016 Griffin Poetry Prize. Her second poetry collection, Letters in a Bruised Cosmos, was a shortlisted nominee for the 2022 Griffin Poetry Prize and Trillium Book Award for Poetry.

Liz Howard grew up in Chapleau, Northern Ontario. Howard is of Anishinaabe descent through her paternal grandmother. She studied cognitive neuroscience at the University of Toronto. Howard received an MFA in Creative Writing from the University of Guelph.

In 2025 she appeared as a guest musician on The Great Lakes Suite, an album by Rheostatics, narrating the spoken word piece "A Wake".

As of March 2026, Howard is an assistant professor of English at Concordia University.

== Works ==
- Infinite Citizen of the Shaking Tent. McClelland & Stewart. 2015. ISBN 9780771038365.
- Letters in a Bruised Cosmos. McClelland & Stewart. 2021. ISBN 9780771037573.
