= Rheostatics =

Canadian indie rock band

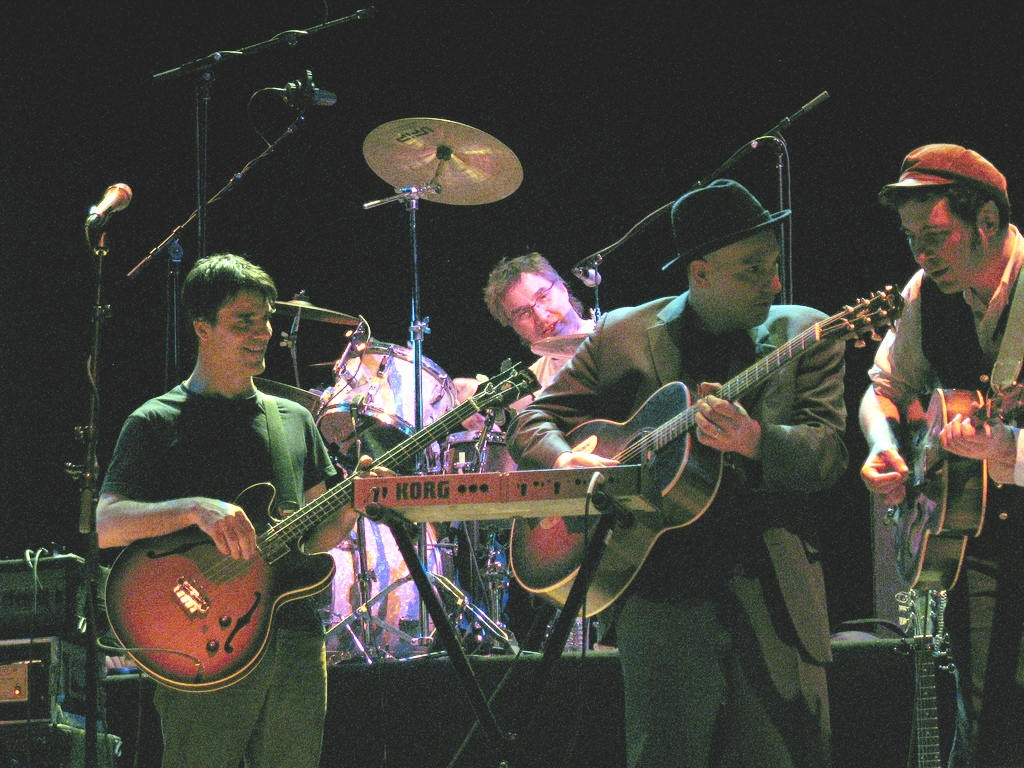
- Rheostatics (2007) L–R: Tim Vesely, Michael Phillip Wojewoda, Dave Bidini, Martin Tielli

Background information
- Origin: Etobicoke, Ontario, Canada
- Genre: Indie rock
- Years active: 1978–2007, 2009, 2015–present
- Labels: Intrepid, Sire, DROG, Perimeter, True North, Zunior, Six Shooter
- Members: Dave Bidini; Dave Clark; Kevin Hearn; Hugh Marsh; Don Kerr; Tim Vesely
- Past members: Dave Crosby; Rod Westlake; Michael Phillip Wojewoda; Martin Tielli; Alex Lifeson
- Website: rheostatics.ca

Rheostatics are a Canadian indie rock band. They were formed in 1978, and actively performed from 1980 until disbanding in 2007. After a number of reunion performances at special events, Rheostatics reformed in late 2016, introducing new songs and performing semi-regularly.

Although they had only one Top 40 hit, "Claire" in 1995, they were simultaneously one of Canada's most influential and unconventional rock bands, a band whose eclectic take on pop and rock music has been described both as iconic and iconoclastic. In particular, two of the band's albums, Whale Music and Melville, have been cited in numerous critical and listener polls as among the best Canadian albums ever recorded.

== History ==
=== Early years ===
Formed in Etobicoke, Ontario in 1978, the band played their first gig at a club called The Edge in February 1980. The band originally consisted of guitarist Dave Bidini, bassist Tim Vesely, drummer Rod Westlake and keyboard player Dave Crosby. Westlake left the band almost immediately, however, and was replaced by Dave Clark. Crosby left the band in 1981. In their earliest years, the band members were all still teenagers, and required special permits to play in most music venues.

The band's early sound was more R&B and funk-oriented than their later, more famous, music. A large horn section, known as The Trans-Canada Soul Patrol, accompanied the group from 1983 to 1985; Clark had met the horn players while taking a jazz class at a summer music school. After the departure of the horn section, Martin Tielli was brought in. Tielli and Clark had previously been bandmates in the group Water Tower.

In the early 1980s the Rheostatics released a number of independent singles, and the three song demo Canadian Dream. The best-known of these early singles was "The Ballad of Wendel Clark, Parts 1 & 2", an ode to the Toronto Maple Leafs player Wendel Clark, which became the band's first hit on college radio and CFNY. In 1987, these songs were collected as the band's debut album, Greatest Hits. Only 1,000 copies of this album were pressed and released originally, and quickly sold out. The album was eventually re-released in 1996. The band also played a role in drawing Canadian country music icon Stompin' Tom Connors out of retirement, after Bidini and Vesely crashed Connors' birthday party in 1986 and wrote an article about it for a Toronto newspaper.

Martin Tielli left the band at the end of 1988, and shortly thereafter the Rheostatics broke up. During the hiatus, Bidini and Clark played a number of shows as supporting musicians for the recently reunited Three O'Clock Train. However, by 1990 the band reunited with exactly the same line-up they had in mid-1988: Bidini, Clark, Tielli and Vesely.

=== Classic era ===
In 1991, the band signed to the independent label Intrepid Records, and released Melville that year. The single "Record Body Count" garnered them significant airplay on radio and MuchMusic. The album also featured an enigmatic cover of Gordon Lightfoot's "The Wreck of the Edmund Fitzgerald".

The following year, the band signed to Sire Records and released Whale Music, which was inspired by Paul Quarrington's award-winning novel Whale Music. Quarrington himself was so impressed by Whale Music's quirky pop—which was perfectly suited to a novel about a quirky, reclusive pop genius liberally based on Brian Wilson—that he chose the band to compose the soundtrack to the film version of his novel. Music from the Motion Picture Whale Music was released in 1994, putting the band in the odd position of having two almost identically-titled albums in its catalogue.

The centrepiece of the soundtrack was "Claire", a love song from the main character in the movie to a woman who'd moved into his house, which became Rheostatics' first and only Top 40 hit and earned the band a Genie Award for Best Original Song in 1994. "Claire" was also featured on the band's album Introducing Happiness, released the same year. That album proved to be the end of the Rheostatics' association with Sire, however, as the label found the band difficult to market.

It was also Clark's last album with the band, as he left to concentrate on his own band, The Dinner Is Ruined. The resignation came very shortly before a cross-Canada tour. Clark has stated in interviews that he left because he was uncomfortable with the chart success of "Claire" and feared that the rest of the band would be persuaded to evolve in a mainstream direction. Tielli's perspective on "Claire", however, was very different:

Dave Clark hated it, but we were totally successful at what the assignment was. Nobody’s picked up on how funny that is: the assignment was to write Desmond Howell’s hit song, and we did it – and it’s our only charting hit, except maybe for "Bad Time to be Poor". It’s funny as hell that we can do it if we want to. I don’t want to, particularly.

Clark was replaced by Don Kerr, whose first performance with the Rheostatics was an unannounced show at the Horseshoe Tavern in March of 1995. Also in 1995, the band first toured with The Tragically Hip as part of the Another Roadside Attraction festival.

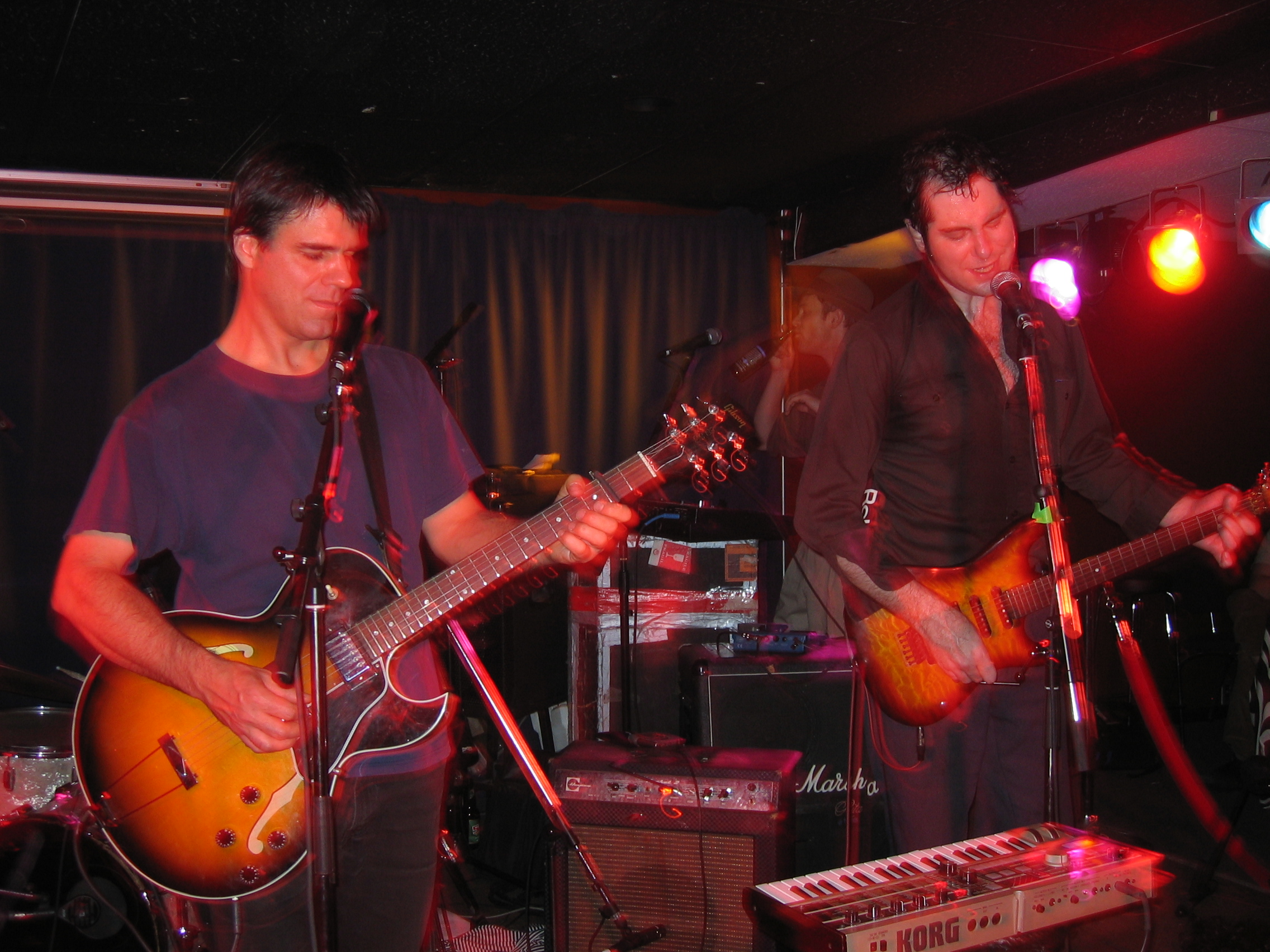
Vesely and Tielli live in 2005

Later in 1995, the band attracted the attention of the National Gallery of Canada, who commissioned the band to write music to accompany a retrospective celebrating the 75th anniversary of another group of artists whose distinctive-yet-accessible artistic outlook had redefined Canadian art, the Group of Seven. That year, working with pianist Kevin Hearn (later of the Barenaked Ladies) and the experimental hip hop group Farm Fresh, they released Music Inspired by the Group of Seven on the independent label DROG Records. Bob Wiseman would sit in for Hearn at the Art Gallery of Ontario show due to Hearn's illness.

The band also opened for the Tragically Hip on that band's tour to support the album Trouble at the Henhouse; this tour culminated in the release of the Tragically Hip’s live album Live Between Us in May 1997, wherein front man Gordon Downie opens the album – and show – by saying, over the beginning of the first track “Grace Too”, “This is for the Rheostatics – we are all richer for having seen them tonight”.

Rheostatics then returned to the studio, and released The Blue Hysteria in 1996. This album garnered airplay for the single "Bad Time to Be Poor," a scathing indictment of life in Ontario during the government of Mike Harris.

In 1997, the band released Double Live, a live album documenting the band in a variety of settings, from small in-store sessions to the large arenas of their tour with The Tragically Hip. The album was very successful on the campus radio charts and is amongst fans' favorites discs.

=== Later years ===
On August 31, 1997 the group performed a live session for the last episode of Night Lines, a music show on CBC Radio Two. Performances from this session were released on 1998's The Nightlines Sessions.

In 1999, the band released The Story of Harmelodia, an album based on a children's story written by Bidini. The album, which featured the band's songs interspersed with narration by Bidini's wife, Janet Morassutti, detailed the adventures of Dot and Bug, two children from the land of Harmelodia who fell through a hole into the land of Popopolis. The album was packaged with a book featuring Tielli's illustrated text of Bidini's story. Hearn and the band's frequent producer, Michael Phillip Wojewoda, contributed significantly to the recording and are listed as members of the band.

In 2001, Rheostatics released Night of the Shooting Stars on Perimeter Records. Though Kerr plays on the album, it was announced prior to its release that he would be departing from the band. The reasons given were his desire to focus on his work at Gas Station Recording Studios in Toronto, as well as his role in Ron Sexsmith's group. Kerr was replaced by Wojewoda.

In late 2001, the band revived their tradition of a week's club residency, formerly known as "Green Sprouts Music Week", and played 11 straight evenings at Toronto's Horseshoe Tavern. Performances from these shows were included on their sole DVD release, 2003's Maple Serum: Rheostatics Live at the Horseshoe Tavern. The event was dubbed the "Fall Nationals" and was repeated for the next three years. Performances from the 2004 Fall Nationals make up the album Calling Out the Chords, Vol. 1, released in 2005.

Their tenth studio album, 2067, was released in the fall of 2004. A digital-only release of the song "Pornography" followed in late 2004. Both were put out by True North Records.

Two live albums followed in 2005, The Whale Music Concert, 1992 and the aforementioned Calling Out the Chords, Vol. 1, the latter being released in digital format only.

On March 30, 2012, the fifth anniversary of the group's final show at Massey Hall, a live album, Green Sprouts Music Week 1993 was released. The album is a distillation and resequencing of material drawn from the band's first Green Sprouts Music Week, held from April 12 to 18, 1993 at Ultrasound Showbar in Toronto. Two singles, live versions of "Record Body Count" and "Woodstuck", were released in digital format and also sent to radio stations.

=== Breakup and final show ===
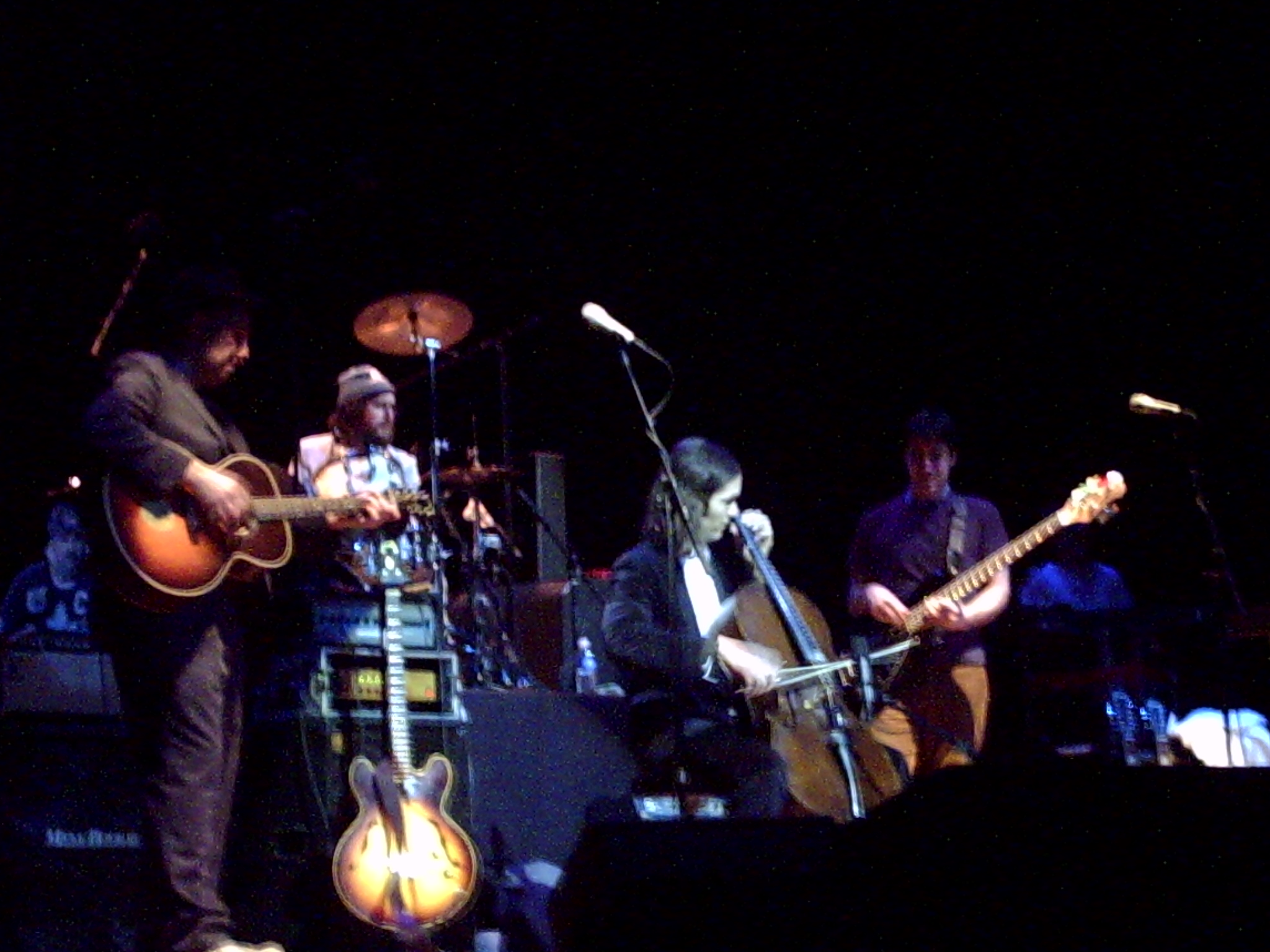
Rheostatics' final show at Massey Hall, 2007. From left to right: Bidini, Clark, Kerr and Vesely

Tim Vesely publicly announced his departure from the band on September 8, 2006, citing his desire to concentrate on his side project The Violet Archers. However, Bidini has indicated that Vesely made his intentions to leave known to the band in January 2006, after they had played a series of concerts in Calgary.

Bidini and Tielli explored the possibility of continuing the band with Wojewoda and collaborating keyboardist Ford Pier, but these plans collapsed after Wojewoda declared he did not want to commit to the band. Subsequent press indicated that the band would not continue following Vesely's exit.

After it was revealed that Vesely would be leaving, Bidini embarked on a solo tour and chronicled his experience in the 2007 book Around the World in 57½ Gigs.

On March 16, 2007, Canadian web label Zunior released a Rheostatics tribute album, The Secret Sessions, which had not been publicized in advance so that it would be a surprise for the band.

A farewell concert was planned and on March 30, 2007, the Rheostatics played Toronto's Massey Hall, the largest venue that they had played as headliners. The concert was recorded for later broadcast on CBC Radio Two's Canada Live, which aired the show on April 7 and again on December 6. Ford Pier substituted for Vesely in some live performances between Vesely's announcement and the final show.

Bidini and Tielli have continued working together after the Massey Hall show. The first of such projects was a musical-theatre piece entitled Five Hole: Tales of Hockey Erotica, produced in collaboration with One Yellow Rabbit. Music from the production was recorded by Bidini, Tielli, Pier, Selina Martin and Barry Mirochnick, and released on the album Music from Five Hole: Tales of Hockey Erotica in February 2009 on Zunior. Vesely and Wojewoda contribute to two tracks.

=== Reunions ===
On October 24, 2009, the band reunited to perform at an event put on by Toronto's International Festival of Authors and Humber College, produced by Judith Keenan of BookShorts, honouring Paul Quarrington, shortly after the late author had publicized his diagnosis with inoperable lung cancer. The former members who had performed were Bidini, Clark, Hearn, Kerr, Tielli and Vesely. They performed two songs: "Claire" followed by "Dope Fiends and Boozehounds". Bidini also hosted the entire event.

Rheostatics announced three reunion concerts to take place on December 5 and 6, 2012 with a lineup of Bidini, Clark, Tielli and Vesely to commemorate the 65th anniversary of the Horseshoe Tavern in Toronto. The shows were ultimately cancelled nine days prior to the planned dates due to Martin Tielli's inability to perform. The owner of Six Shooter Records (the band's label) indicates that Tielli told her it was due to his long-time battle with stage fright.

On April 12, 2014, Rheostatics (Bidini, Kerr, Tielli, Vesely) performed with Bidiniband and various guests as part of the 2nd Annual Stompin' Tom Memorial Show at the Horseshoe Tavern.

On September 4, 5 and 6, 2015, Rheostatics (Bidini, Kerr, Tielli, Vesely) with Kevin Hearn, plus guest Hugh Marsh performed the album Music Inspired by the Group of Seven in its entirety at the Art Gallery of Ontario. They also performed an unannounced nine song set on September 3, 2015 as part of a tribute concert at the Art Gallery of Ontario. In the early hours of September 7, 2015 Rheostatics performed with various guests at an after party at the Monarch Tavern after the performance at the AGO.

On April 29, 2016, Rheostatics (Bidini, Kerr, Tielli, Vesely) with Kevin Hearn and Hugh Marsh performed at Massey Hall. They performed a warm-up show on April 24, 2016 at the Starlight Social Club in Waterloo, Ontario with the same line-up.

On August 27, 2016, Rheostatics (Bidini, Kerr, Tielli, Vesely) with Kevin Hearn and Hugh Marsh headlined at the Harvest Picnic festival (Christie Lake, Ontario). On September 18, 2016 the same line-up performed at the Toronto Urban Roots Festival (TURF).

=== Reforming ===
On December 9 and 10, 2016, Rheostatics (Bidini, Clark, Tielli, Vesely, Hearn, Marsh) performed at the Horseshoe Tavern in Toronto, where five new songs were debuted: "Mountains and the Sea" (Bidini), "Music is the Message" (Vesely), "Chemical Valley" (Hearn), "Albatross" (Tielli) and "It's the Super Controller!" (Clark). With Dave Clark returning to the drum kit, and the introduction of new material by all members, this show marked a return to regular, if infrequent, performances.

On January 1, 2017, the band appeared on The Hip 30, a special Tragically Hip tribute episode of CBC Radio 2's The Strombo Show, performing a cover of the Tragically Hip's "Bobcaygeon".

In June 2018, Rheostatics started recording sessions for a new album. Here Come the Wolves was released on September 6, 2019. It is their twelfth album and their first album of original material in 14 years.

In August of 2024, recording sessions started for The Great Lakes Suite. The band consisted of Bidini, Clark, Hearn, Kerr, Marsh, and Vesely, joined by Rush guitarist Alex Lifeson. Additional contributors included Tanya Tagaq, Chief Stacey LaForme, Laurie Anderson, Anne Carson, and Liz Howard. It was wholly improvised live in studio over four days of recording. The album was released on November 21, 2025, and was launched with a concert in Toronto including contributions by Lifeson and multimedia video by Nicholas de Pencier and Jennifer Baichwal.

== Style ==
The band's style was highly eclectic, feeding off the creative cross-pollination of each member's distinct musical style, and was marked by a willingness to experiment with just about any musical idea. Tielli's material tended toward progressive rock and folk rock, Bidini brought quirky humour and new wave influences, Vesely pursued a relatively mainstream pop-rock orientation which meant that his songs (including both "Claire" and "Bad Time to Be Poor") garnered nearly all of the band's radio airplay, and Clark's songs were punk-flavoured.

While this eclecticism appealed to the band's fans, it also made them difficult for a major label to market – some of their later albums, especially Introducing Happiness, were described by critics as playing more like compilation albums than the work of a single band with a coherent and unified vision. Bobby Baker of The Tragically Hip remarked in 1997, "I think maybe they're a little too good for their own good."

== Critical reception ==
In a 1996 reader poll published by Chart to determine the 100 best Canadian albums, Whale Music placed fifth, behind only Neil Young, Joni Mitchell, The Tragically Hip and Sloan. Their album Melville placed sixteenth. When the magazine conducted a follow-up poll in 2000, Whale Music placed fourth and Melville placed fifth. In the 2005 poll, Whale Music placed tenth, becoming one of six albums to place in the top ten all three times, and Melville placed 44th. In all of the magazine's three polls, Neil Young is the only other artist to have achieved the distinction of placing two albums in the top five in the same year.

In Bob Mersereau's 2007 book The Top 100 Canadian Albums, Whale Music ranked nineteenth and Melville was ranked 38th.

In June 2009, Rheostatics and Eric's Trip were the first artists to be inducted into Zunior's Independent Music Hall of Fame. The official illustration of the group, by Trevor Waurechen, depicts Bidini, Clark, Hearn, Kerr, Tielli, Vesely and Wojewoda.

== Legacy ==
Australian novelist Patrick Holland claimed the 'gas station' scene from his novel The Mary Smokes Boys was inspired by Whale Music's 'Self Serve Gas Station'.

== Discography ==
=== Studio albums ===
- Greatest Hits, 1987
- Melville, 1991
- Whale Music, 1992
- Music from The Motion Picture Whale Music, 1994
- Introducing Happiness, 1994
- Music Inspired by the Group of Seven, 1995
- The Blue Hysteria, 1996
- The Nightlines Sessions, 1998
- The Story of Harmelodia, 1999
- Night of the Shooting Stars, 2001
- 2067, 2004
- Here Come the Wolves, 2019
- The Great Lakes Suite, 2025

=== Live albums ===
- Double Live, 1997
- The Whale Music Concert, 1992, 2005
- Calling Out the Chords, Vol. 1, 2005
- Green Sprouts Music Week 1993, 2012
- Brave New Waves Session, 2017

=== Other releases ===
- My Generation/Satellite Dancing, 1981, 7" vinyl
- Rheostatics TV, Vol. 1, 1998, VHS
- Rheostatics TV, Vol. 2, 1998, VHS
- Maple Serum: Rheostatics Live at the Horseshoe Tavern, 2003, DVD
- Pornography, 2004, Digital audio

=== Compilation inclusions ===
- SMASH '83, 1983 ("Thank You")
- Brave New Waves, 1991 ("Dope Fiends and Boozehounds")
- Moose: The Compilation, 1991 ("Woodstuck")
- Borrowed Tunes, 1994 ("Everybody Knows This Is Nowhere" (with The Bourbon Tabernacle Choir))
- Truck Songs: Volume 1, 1995 ("Secret Red Canoe")
- Big Wheelz 98, 1998 ("Record Body Count (live)")
- CBC Radio 3 Sessions, Vol. 1, 2004 ("Harmelodia (Easy to Be with You)")
- The Rough Guide to the Music of Canada, 2005 ("Seven/Northern Wish")
- ... A Compilation for Reach for the Rainbow, 2005 ("Soul Glue (Rheostar Version)")
- Brampton Indie Arts Festival, Vol. 1: The Suburban Manifesto, 2007 ("Technosoulglue")
- Superhero Suite, 2019 ("Waiting for a Superman")
