= Music from the Motion Picture Whale Music =

Soundtrack album by Rheostatics
- Released: 1994
- Genre: Indie rock
- Label: Sire

Rheostatics chronology
Whale Music (1992)	Music from the Motion Picture Whale Music (1994)	Introducing Happiness (1994)

Professional ratings
Review scores
Source	Rating
Allmusic	link

Music from The Motion Picture Whale Music is a 1994 album by Rheostatics. It is the soundtrack to the film version of Paul Quarrington's novel Whale Music, and should not be confused with the band's 1992 album Whale Music.

The album includes "Claire", which in 1995 became the band's only Top 40 hit. That song is also included on the band's album Introducing Happiness.

Both "Claire" and "Song of Courtship" received Genie Award nominations for Best Original Song at the 15th Genie Awards, which "Claire" won.

== Track listing ==
1. "Song of Congregation" – 3:53
2. "Find Me Mookie Saunders" – 1:32
3. "Torque, Torque" – 2:10
4. "Desmond's Reflections" – 1:55
5. "Dez's Lament/Claire" – 4:32
6. "Ocean Courtship" – 1:51
7. "Song of Flight" – 3:38
8. "Fried Brain" – 2:00
9. "Song of Danger" – 4:10
10. "Song of Courtship" – 2:32
11. "Goodbye Claire" – 1:15
12. "Song of Sadness" – 3:58
13. "Euqrot, Euqrot" – 1:40
14. "End Title" – 4:02
15. "Deconstruct Me, Claire" – 4:13
