= Dave Bidini =

Canadian musician and writer

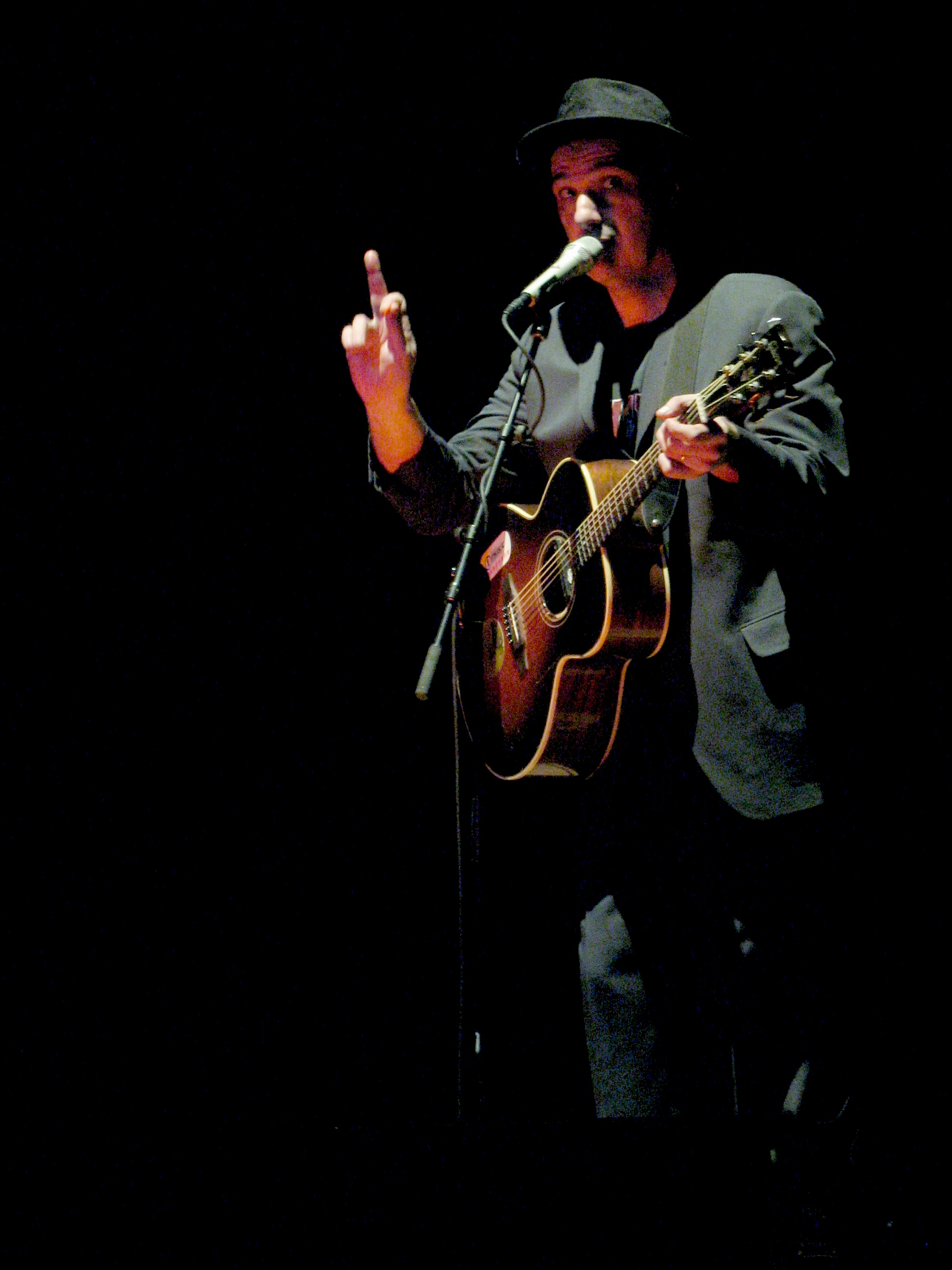
- Bidini performing with Rheostatics at Massey Hall, 2007

Background information
- Born: September 11, 1963 (age 62); Etobicoke, Ontario, Canada
- Genres: Indie rock
- Occupations: Musician, songwriter, journalist, author
- Instruments: Guitar, bass, vocals, drums
- Years active: 1979–present
- Label: Pheromone

Dave Bidini (born September 11, 1963) is a Canadian musician and writer. Originally from Etobicoke, Ontario, he is a founding member of the rock band Rheostatics, and leads the intermittently active Bidiniband. In addition, he has published several books about music, travel and sports, and has written feature journalism pieces and columns for numerous Canadian magazines and newspapers. He is the only Canadian to have been nominated for all three of Canada's main entertainment awards, the Gemini Award for television work, the Genie Awards for film work and the Juno Awards for music, as well as being nominated on Canada's national book awards program, Canada Reads.

== Rheostatics (1979–2007) ==
With bass player / singer Tim Vesely, keyboardist Dave Crosby, and drummer Rod Westlake, Bidini formed the Rheostatics in 1979. After their first studio session and early shows (the band debuted in February 1980 at The Edge), Westlake left the band, and Bidini recruited drummer Dave Clark, which cemented the band's formative lineup.

They released their first independent single, "Satellite Dancing/My Generation," and played their first few Toronto shows in 1980, notably opening for Popular Spies at Toronto's legendary Edge Club. When Crosby left the band after 1981, they enlisted a horn section ("Trans Canada Soul Patrol"), released a few independent cassettes, and in 1985, began playing with guitarist / singer / songwriter Martin Tielli.

Two of the band's eleven albums, 1990's Melville and 1992's Whale Music have been listed among top Canadian records of all time, both in Bob Mersereau's book The Top 100 Canadian Albums and in three reader polls conducted by the music magazine Chart.

In 1995, they recorded Music Inspired by the Group of Seven, a commissioned work from the National Gallery of Canada, and later made The Story of Harmelodia, a concept album considered one of the finest children's recordings of its time. Their biggest chart hit was 1994's "Claire," which they recorded as part of the soundtrack to the film Whale Music, and two years later, the band opened a cross-Canada tour for The Tragically Hip, which became the basis for Bidini's book On a Cold Road.

After 27 years, the Rheostatics broke up in 2007, their alleged final show was in March 2007 at Toronto's Massey Hall. However, the band reunited in 2016 for a concert at Massey Hall, TO, and released a new album, Here Come the Wolves in 2019.

Bidini's wife, Janet Morassutti—guitar player in Toronto noir-folk quintet The Billie Hollies—has received songwriting credit on the band's songs "Dope Fiends and Boozehounds", "Delta 88" and "Northern Wish", and was the narrator on the band's 1999 children's album The Story of Harmelodia.

== Bidiniband (2007–present) ==
BidiniBand
- Origin: Toronto, Ontario, Canada
- Genres: Indie-rock
- Years active: 2007–present
- Label: Pheromone
- Members: Dave Bidini; Don Kerr; Paul Linklater; Doug Friesen

After the demise of Rheostatics, Bidini formed Bidiniband, featuring former Rheostatics member Don Kerr on drums, Paul Linklater on guitar, and Doug Friesen on bass. Their debut album, The Land is Wild, was produced by Kerr and was released on Pheromone Recordings in 2009. Bidini's website describes the album features "more songs about dead hockey players, cannibalism and lesbian school teachers."

In between records, the band hosted the annual "Stolen From a Hockey Card" concert at CBC's Hockey Day in Canada. They backed up musicians ranging from Sarah Harmer to John K. Samson to Bryan Trottier to Carmen Townshend performing original songs about hockey players and the games cultures. They have also been part of Bidini's annual Torn From the Pages literary event, which gathers musicians and writers to create original works based on a single work of fiction, including Linden MacIntyre's Why Men Lie and Michael Crummey's Galore.

The band's second album, In the Rock Hall, was released on January 31, 2012, and recorded at Toronto's Revolution Recordings. The song "I Wanna Go to Yemen" was named one of the Top 100 songs of 2012 by CBC Radio 3. The album's title comes from a poem by Paul Quarrington.

The band's third album, The Motherland, was released on May 29, 2014.

== Writing ==
Bidini was first published at 11 years old in the Toronto Sun's "Young Sun" pullout section, writing a poem about Maple Leaf hockey player Eddie Shack. He started contributing for The Sunshine News, a national highschool newspaper, and later, Toronto alternative rock magazine Shades, for whom he interviewed Harlequin, Devo, The Dickies, R.E.M., Katrina and the Waves, The B-52s, Ramones and other artists. Afterwards, he wrote for OP magazine as well as The Village Voice, which is where his first sports writing appeared – including "Why I Love Wayne," which later became "Why I Love Wayne Bradley," from his book The Five Hole Stories.

In 1986, he wrote a piece about Canadian musician Stompin' Tom Connors for Nerve magazine, which ended up encouraging the exiled musician to come out of retirement (the story also appeared in Bidini's first book, On a Cold Road). Bidini was a columnist for the Toronto Star between 1991 and 1993; his stories were written on a portable typewriter from the road and submitted via gas station faxes, and his 1996 tour diary for the same paper became the essence of his first book.

His second book, Tropic of Hockey, about playing hockey in China, Dubai and Transylvania, was named one of the Top 100 Canadian books of all time, and established what would become the writer's template: travel, sports and music written from an experiential perspective. He has been called everything from "the Ry Cooder of hockey" to "George Plimpton soaked in maple syrup."

His 2006 book The Five Hole Stories, a compilation of erotic short stories set in the world of professional ice hockey, was adapted by One Yellow Rabbit into the stage play Five Hole: Tales of Hockey Erotica, and by Cam Christiansen as the animated short film Five Hole: Tales of Hockey Erotica.

In 2010, broadcaster Ron MacLean told a Saturday night audience on Hockey Night in Canada that Bidini was "one of this country's most important voices in music and hockey" before premiering a track, "The Land is Wild," from his band's first album. In 2007's Around the World in 57½ Gigs, he documented being among the first ever Canadian rock bands to embark on a festival tour of China, performing in towns that had never seen western rock music before, and in Home and Away, he wrote about the experiences of Canada's homeless soccer team at the Homeless World Cup. After the book's success, Bidini later became a board member for Street Soccer Canada, a non-profit body that sends teams annually to the tournament.

Bidini wrote a weekly Saturday column for the National Post, but was dismissed in 2015.

His 2002 book Baseballissimo was optioned for the screen by co-producer Geddy Lee of Rush with a script written by actor Jay Baruchel (Goon). In 2011, On a Cold Road was named a finalist for Canada Reads, CBC Radio's national books contest. In 2009, he successfully championed Paul Quarrington's novel King Leary on the same series.

In 2017, Bidini founded the community newspaper the West End Phoenix, which focuses on life in Toronto's west end. He is the editor and publisher of the newspaper. Contributors to the paper have included David Seymour, Heidi Sopinka, Katrina Onstad, Amanda Leduc, Waubgeshig Rice, Dani Couture, Michee Mee, Michael Winter, Claudia Dey, Michael Barclay, Phoebe Wang, Paul Vermeersch, Niko Stratis, Micah Toub, Glyn Bowerman, Shari Kasman, Shaughnessy Bishop-Stall, Elamin Abdelmahmoud, Jon Lorinc, and Ken Babstock.

=== Plays ===
Bidini has written two plays, Five Hole: Tales of Hockey Erotica, which was toured nationally in 2009 by One Yellow Rabbit and later adapted into a short animated film by Cam Christiansen, and The Night of the Dogs, which has been staged, in sections, by the sketch comedy group, The Imponderables. In 2012, Bidini lent the sketch group the song "I Wanna Go to Yemen" for their popular web series Bill and Sons Towing.

=== Films ===
Bidini wrote and hosted the Gemini Award-winning adaptation of Tropic of Hockey, called Hockey Nomad, which was first broadcast on CBC Television in January 2003. In the film, he travelled to Dubai, Transylvania and Mongolia to play the game and explore local hockey culture. His follow-up film was The Hockey Nomad Goes to Russia, which was nominated for a subsequent Gemini Award. In the film, Bidini became the only Canadian in history to dress as a member of the Russian Legends' national team, playing left defence on a touring club featuring members of the 1972 Russian national team, and others. The film features, amongst others, Alexander Yakushev, Yuri Blinov, Alexander Gusev and a 12-year-old Zhenya Kuznetsov, who six years later would be drafted by the Washington Capitals in the first round of the 2010 NHL entry draft.

The CBC also commissioned Bidini for a one-hour documentary on soccer entitled Kick in the Head for the 2008 Soccer Day in Canada.

== Awards ==
He has won three National Magazine Awards for his writing. In 2010, his story "Travels in Narnia", published in Maisonneuve, placed first, and his article on Clara Hughes in the Calgary Herald's Swerve Magazine won an honourable mention. He previously won for the Saturday Night piece "Hockey Night in Dubai", which was later expanded into one of Tropic of Hockey's narrative triptych.

His tenth book, Writing Gordon Lightfoot: The Man, the Music, and the World in 1972, was nominated for a Toronto Book Award in 2012.

== Books ==
- On a Cold Road: Tales of Adventure in Canadian Rock (1998)
- Tropic of Hockey (2001)
- Baseballissimo (2004)
- For Those About to Rock (2004)
- The Best Game You Can Name (2005)
- The Five Hole Stories (2006)
- For Those About to Write: I Refute You (2007)
- Around the World in 57½ Gigs (2007)
- Home and Away: In Search of Dreams at the Homeless World Cup of Soccer (2010)
- Writing Gordon Lightfoot: The Man, the Music, and the World in 1972 (2011)
- A Wild Stab for It: This Is Game Eight From Russia (2012)
- Keon and Me: The Search for the Lost Soul of the Toronto Maple Leafs (2013)
- Midnight Light: A Personal Journey to the North (2018)
