= Coax Me =

Single by Sloan

from the album Twice Removed
- Released: 1994
- Genre: Indie rock
- Length: 3:26
- Label: Geffen Records, murderecords
- Songwriters: Chris Murphy, Sloan

Sloan singles chronology
"I Am the Cancer" (1993)	"Coax Me" (1994)	"Penpals" (1994)

Music video
- "Coax Me" on YouTube

"Coax Me" is a song by Canadian rock band Sloan. It was released as the lead single of their second album Twice Removed. The song peaked at #30 on the Canadian RPM Singles Chart, spending 12 weeks in the top 100. It was also featured on Sloan's compilation album, A Sides Win: Singles 1992-2005.

== Content ==
Chris Murphy has stated that "Coax Me" is "an allegory type song about the difference between being on a major label and playing just for yourself".

The song references the industrial band Consolidated in its lyrics, later stating 'It's not the band I hate / it's their fans'. Murphy clarified this line was not in reference to fans of Consolidated but, rather, fans of Kate Bush. Sloan co-vocalist Jay Ferguson contributed the line after encountering several classmates who were overzealous in their Kate Bush fandom.

== Charts ==
=== Weekly charts ===
Chart (1994)	Peak position
Canada Top Singles (RPM)	30
