= The Wreck of the Edmund Fitzgerald =

1976 song by Gordon Lightfoot

Single by Gordon Lightfoot

from the album Summertime Dream
- B-side: "The House You Live In"
- Released: August 1976
- Recorded: December 1975
- Studio: Eastern Sound Studios, Toronto
- Genre: Folk rock; soft rock; progressive folk
- Length: 6:30 (album version); 5:57 (single edit)
- Label: Reprise
- Songwriter: Gordon Lightfoot
- Producers: Lenny Waronker; Gordon Lightfoot

Gordon Lightfoot singles chronology
"Rainy Day People" (1975)	"The Wreck of the Edmund Fitzgerald" (1976)	"Race Among the Ruins" (1976)

Audio
- "The Wreck of the Edmund Fitzgerald" on YouTube

"The Wreck of the Edmund Fitzgerald" is a 1976 folk rock ballad written, composed, and performed by the Canadian singer-songwriter Gordon Lightfoot to memorialize the sinking of the bulk carrier SS Edmund Fitzgerald in Lake Superior on November 10, 1975.

Appearing originally on his 1976 album Summertime Dream, Lightfoot re-recorded the song in 1988 for the compilation album Gord's Gold, Vol. 2. "The Wreck of the Edmund Fitzgerald" was a hit for Lightfoot, reaching number 1 in his native Canada in the RPM chart. In the US, it peaked at number 2 on the Billboard Hot 100 and reached number one on the Cashbox Top 100.

Following Lightfoot's death in 2023, the song had a new peak in popularity, reaching number twenty on the Billboard magazine's Hot Rock & Alternative Songs chart in May of that year.

At an annual memorial service held each November by the Great Lakes Maritime Academy, a bell has been rung 29 times to honor the men lost on the Edmund Fitzgerald. In commemoration of Lightfoot's writing of the lyrics to the ballad, the memorial service now follows the commemoration bell count of: "29 for the lives lost that day back in 1975 on Lake Superior, once for all lives lost at sea, and once for singer Gordon Lightfoot, who wrote the ballad of the ship’s sinking".

== Composition ==
The song chronicles the final voyage of the Edmund Fitzgerald as it succumbed to an intense late-season storm and sank in Lake Superior with the loss of all 29 crewmen. Lightfoot drew inspiration from news reports he gathered in the immediate aftermath, particularly the article "The Cruelest Month" published in the November 24, 1975 issue of Newsweek. Lightfoot could also draw upon his personal experience with recreational sailing on the Great Lakes. Lightfoot himself considered this song to be his finest work.

Recorded before the ship's wreckage had been studied, the song reflects some speculation about how the disaster transpired. In later interviews, Lightfoot recounted how he had agonized over possible inaccuracies while trying to pen the lyrics until his lead guitarist Terry Clements convinced him to do what Clements' favourite author Mark Twain would have advised: just tell a story.

In March 2010, Lightfoot changed a line during live performances to reflect new findings about how the ship had foundered. The original words, "At 7 p.m. a main hatchway caved in; he said...", Lightfoot began singing as "At 7 p.m. it grew dark, it was then he said...." Lightfoot learned about the new findings when contacted for permission to use his song for a History Channel documentary that aired on March 31, 2010. Lightfoot stated that he did not intend to change the original copyrighted lyrics; instead, from then on, he simply sang the revised lyrics during live performances. Lightfoot also changed the words "musty old hall" (referring to "the Maritime Sailors' Cathedral", in fact the Mariners' Church of Detroit) to "rustic old hall".

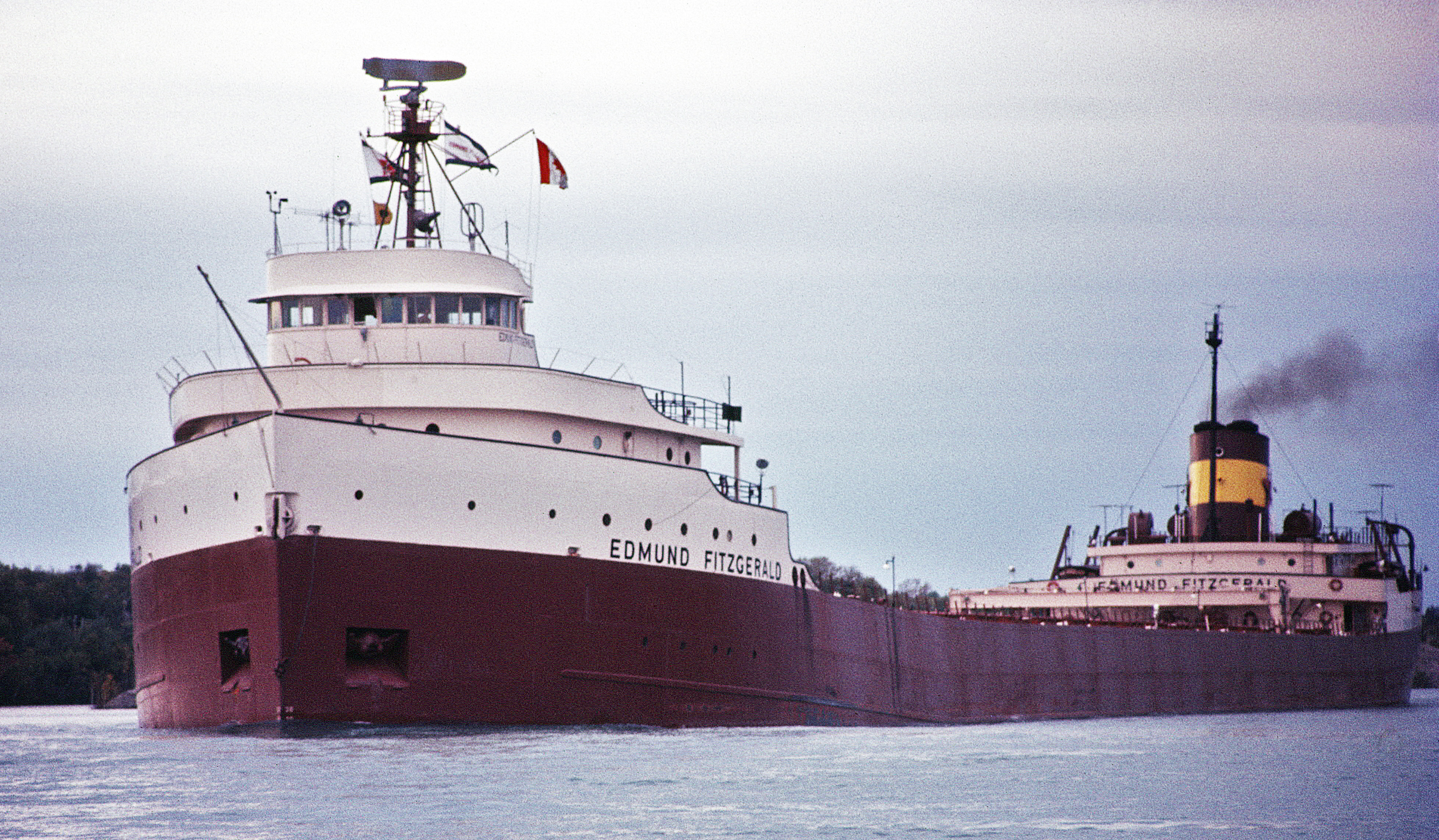
SS Edmund Fitzgerald in 1971

== Melody ==
The song follows 6/8 time with a straightforward arrangement described by Adam Perlmutter in Acoustic Guitar as "pretty simple—just five open shapes in the key of A major (sounding as B, due to a second-fret capo). Instead of an A chord (A C♯ E), there’s an A^{sus2}, a type of suspended triad in which the third (C♯) is replaced with the second (B). Then there’s the G^{6}/A, or a G^{6} chord (G B D E) with an A as the lowest note, used only in the intro/interlude section".

The melody for the song was later adapted by Bobby Sands for his song "Back Home in Derry". When asked about the similarity and why he did not pursue copyright infringement, Lightfoot said that the melody was "just an old Irish folk song; an old Irish dirge. I think I took it from that. It's all folk music and it's all out there for everyone to enjoy."

== Lyrics ==
The song narrates the final and difficult journey of the Edmund Fitzgerald through the storm and the frantic moments before the shipwreck. The seven stanzas of the song are written with eight lines each, with the first line of the first stanza reading: "The legend lives on from the Chippewa on down". The lyrics were strongly inspired by the article "The Cruelest Month", which appeared on 24 November 1975 in Newsweek magazine. In addition to reporting the disaster, the article also illustrated the legends of the Ojibwe people of Lake Superior (historically also known in English as "Chippewa"), which are mentioned in the song. A recurring theme of the song is the violence of the bad weather in the late autumn season on the Great Lakes in November, which would ultimately lead to the catastrophe of the Fitzgerald. For example, one of the central laments in the lyrics of the song speaks of the nearness of safe harbor in the presence of imminent disaster, stating:

Does any one know where the love of God goes
when the waves turn the minutes to hours?
The searchers all say they'd have made Whitefish Bay
if they'd put fifteen more miles behind her.

Lightfoot, unable to know exactly how the tragedy had unfolded, by his own admission took some artistic liberties in recounting the sequence of events, for example by describing a collapse of a hatchway prior to the wreck. Over time Lightfoot made slight modifications to the lyrics as more information about the disaster became available.

During the following years the composer, who was surprised by the enormous success of the song, was open to rework the lyrics in light of new developments in the investigations into the disaster and the public's sensitivity. Although he declared that he did not want to modify the original lyrics of the song officially, often during live performances Lightfoot varied some verses to "update" them or to meet the requests of the public and the families of the victims. For example, in the original lyrics the church that commemorates the shipwreck is "a musty old hall"; after the complaints of a parishioner, Lightfoot changed the passage to "a rustic old hall". The song was written with no choruses, and no lyrical bridge or change of key; it was also written without any lyrical intro or outro.

== Production ==
The song was recorded in December 1975 at Eastern Sound, a recording studio composed of two Victorian houses at 48 Yorkville Avenue in a then-hippie district of downtown Toronto. The studio was later demolished and replaced by a parking lot, which has since been replaced with a garden, the Mist Garden. Pee Wee Charles and Terry Clements came up with "the haunting guitar and steel riffs" during the evening session.

According to an article in the Toronto Star, the final version of "The Wreck of the Edmund Fitzgerald" was indeed the first take of the song, and it was the first time Lightfoot and his band had ever played it together, and the album's recording engineer, Kenny Frieson, fortunately decided to record the performance down on tape because the band was playing the song through for the first time. The band rehearsed other attempts at recording it for two weeks afterward, but they were unable to capture the magic of that initial, unrehearsed performance, so the first take was used for the recording. In an interview with the Detroit Free Press, bassist Rick Haynes recalled Lightfoot initially only thought "The Wreck of the Edmund Fitzgerald" to be a short, unfinished song, but it was recorded when they had studio time left for the Summertime Dream album.

== Chart success ==
Lightfoot's single version hit number 1 in his native Canada (in the RPM national singles survey) on November 20, 1976, barely a year after the disaster. In the United States, it reached number 1 in Cashbox and number 2 for two weeks in the Billboard Hot 100 (behind Rod Stewart's "Tonight's the Night"), making it Lightfoot's second-most successful single, behind only "Sundown". Overseas it was at best a minor hit, peaking at number 40 in the UK Singles Chart.

=== Weekly charts ===
Weekly chart performance for "The Wreck of the Edmund Fitzgerald"
Chart (1976–1977)	Peak position
Australian KMR	46
Canadian RPM Top Singles	1
Canadian RPM Adult Contemporary Tracks	1
Canadian RPM Country Tracks	1
US Billboard Hot 100	2
US Adult Contemporary (Billboard)	9
US Hot Country Songs (Billboard)	50
US Cash Box Top 100	1

2023–2026 weekly chart performance for "The Wreck of the Edmund Fitzgerald"
Chart (2023–2026)	Peak position
US Hot Rock & Alternative Songs (Billboard)	15

=== Year-end charts ===
Year-end chart performance for "The Wreck of the Edmund Fitzgerald"
Chart (1976)	Rank
Canada RPM Top Singles	12
US (Joel Whitburn's Pop Annual)	36
US Cash Box	22

== Popular culture ==
Canadian indie rock band Rheostatics recorded a cover of the song for their album Melville in 1991, and included the song in their concerts to promote their 2025 album The Great Lakes Suite, though not included in the album release itself. Another cover of the song was done by the Indianapolis hard rock musicians Simon Bar Sinister in 1997 for Sage records which includes a lead guitar rock solo after the end of the fourth stanza; in the closing verses of the song the cymbals are intoned in the background 29 times at half-second intervals to honor the 29 dead sailors lost at sea. The Cantus vocal ensemble did a pensive cover of the song in 2006 accompanied by acoustic guitar, cello and fife. In 2018 the University of Michigan Men's Glee Club recorded a live performance of the song featuring a baritone soloist and accompanied by two acoustic guitars, cello and piano.

In 2019, the Canadian rock group Headstones covered the song and released a single of their cover. Tony Rice covered the song on his 1983 album Church Street Blues, and this cover was also included on his compilation album Tony Rice Sings Gordon Lightfoot. The American band Punch Brothers covered the song on their reimagining of Rice's Church Street Blues, Hell on Church Street. The song was covered in 2023 by the English folk group The Longest Johns with an associated music video. The song was also covered in 2025 by the a cappella group Home Free with an associated music video. American bluegrass artist Billy Strings performed a 12-minute cover of the song in August 2025 featuring a 3-minute extended instrumental introduction to the song played on acoustic guitar, and a second 4-minute acoustic guitar solo at the end of the fourth stanza.

Although the lyrics of the song memorialize the 29 lives lost, since Lightfoot's death in 2023 the sinking has been commemorated with 31 rings of the memorial bell at the Great Lakes Maritime Academy: "29 for the lives lost that day back in 1975 on Lake Superior, once for all lives lost at sea, and once for singer Gordon Lightfoot, who wrote the ballad of the ship’s sinking." Following the singer-songwriter's death, the song had a new peak in popularity that same year, reaching number twenty on the Billboard magazine's Hot Rock & Alternative Songs chart in May 2023.

The melody of the song is a recurring motif in the second season of the psychological thriller Severance, where it is whistled by the character Dr. Mauer.

== Personnel ==
- Gordon Lightfoot – vocals, 12-string acoustic guitar
- Terry Clements – electric guitar
- Pee Wee Charles – pedal steel guitar
- Rick Haynes – electric bass
- Barry Keane – drums
- Gene Martynec – Moog synthesizer

Production

- Producer: Lenny Waronker, Gordon Lightfoot
- Engineer: Ken Friesen
- Mixing Engineer: Lee Herschberg

== See also ==
- SS Yarmouth Castle, another ship disaster memorialized in a song by Lightfoot
- Rock music of Canada
- Music of Canada
