= Melville (album) =

Studio album by Rheostatics
- Released: April 1991
- Recorded: 1990
- Studio: Reaction (Toronto)
- Genre: Indie rock
- Length: 54:05 (41:53 on cassette)
- Label: Green Sprouts
- Producer: Michael Phillip Wojewoda

Rheostatics chronology
Greatest Hits (1987)	Melville (1991)	Whale Music (1992)

Professional ratings
Review scores
Source	Rating
AllMusic	4/5 stars

Melville is the second studio album by the Canadian rock band Rheostatics, released in 1991. This album garnered wide airplay across Canada, and the single "Record Body Count" was a significant hit for the band on Canadian alternative rock stations and MuchMusic in 1991.

The album's title was a complex, multilayered reference, meant to simultaneously evoke both writer Herman Melville and the town of Melville, Saskatchewan, as well as Lewis Melville, a frequent collaborator with the band who appeared as a session musician on the album.

The song “You Are Very Star”, a bonus track on the CD release, ends with a hockey announcer’s narration in which the band is presented as a hockey team competing for the league’s top ranking against 13 Engines, Scott B. Sympathy and Tom Cochrane.

In 1996, the Canadian music magazine Chart conducted a reader poll to determine the best Canadian albums of all time. Melville placed 16th in that poll. When the magazine conducted a follow-up poll in 2000, Melville placed fifth, behind only Joni Mitchell, Neil Young, Sloan and Rheostatics’ 1992 album Whale Music. In the magazine’s third poll in 2005, Melville placed 44th, but was one of only 25 albums to have placed in the Top 50 in all three polls.

== Track listing ==
All songs are credited to the Rheostatics, except where noted.

Melville track listing
No.	Title	Lead vocals	Length
1.	"Record Body Count"	Martin Tielli	1:54
2.	"Aliens (Christmas 1988)"	Tielli	4:17
3.	"Northern Wish" (Janet Morassutti, Rheostatics)	Tielli	4:16
4.	"Saskatchewan"	Tielli	5:56
5.	"Horses"	Dave Bidini	4:47
6.	"Christopher"	Tielli	4:25
7.	"Chanson Les Ruelles"	Tim Vesely	2:49
8.	"Lying's Wrong"	Tielli	2:44
9.	"It"	Tielli	4:29
10.	"When Winter Comes"	Bidini, Tielli	6:32
11.	"The Wreck of the Edmund Fitzgerald" (Gordon Lightfoot)	Vesely	8:45
12.	"You Are Very Star"	Ensemble	3:28

The last two songs are bonus tracks available only on the CD version of the album.

== Personnel ==
Personnel taken from Melville liner notes.

- Dave Bidini – rhythm guitar, bass, vocals
- Martin Tielli – lead guitar, vocals
- Dave Clark – drums, bodhrán, vocals
- Tim Vesely – bass, piano, acoustic guitar, vocals
