= Bob Mersereau =

Canadian journalist

Bob Ellis Mersereau is a Canadian arts journalist.

He is a music columnist and longtime arts reporter for CBC Television in New Brunswick. Since 1982, he has been a reporter on the East Coast music scene for CBC Radio, CBC Television, and the Telegraph-Journal. Nicknamed Rockin' Bob by Peter Gzowski, Mersereau was a frequent guest on CBC programs such as Morningside and Sounds Like Canada.

Mersereau is the author of the 2007 book The Top 100 Canadian Albums, its 2010 follow-up The Top 100 Canadian Singles, the 2015 book The History of Canadian Rock 'n' Roll, and most recently The East Coast Book of Fame: Top 50. His daughter, Jamie Kitts, is also an author and a small-press editor.
