= Tim Vesely =

Canadian musician and songwriter (born 1963)

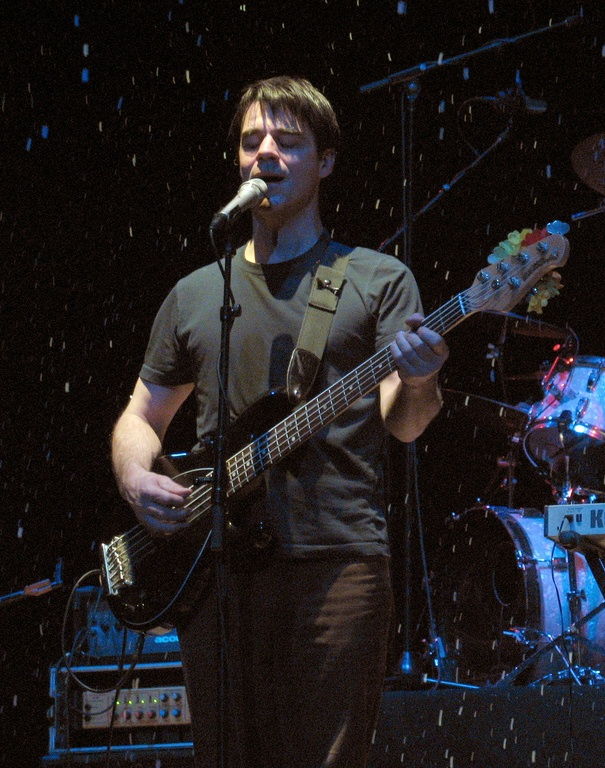
- Vesely performing with the Rheostatics at Massey Hall 2007

Background information
- Born: 10 December 1963 (age 62)
- Origin: Etobicoke, Ontario, Canada
- Genres: Indie rock
- Instruments: Bass, guitar, vocals, keyboard, mandolin, accordion, double bass
- Years active: 1980–present
- Formerly of: Rheostatics; The Violet Archers; Great Aunt Ida; L'Étranger
- Website: thevioletarchers.com

Timothy Warren Vesely (born 10 December 1963) is a Canadian musician and songwriter. He is best known as a founding member of the indie rock band Rheostatics, in which he shared vocal duties with bandmates Dave Bidini and Martin Tielli. Vesely wrote much of the band's conventionally pop and rock-oriented material, including both of the band's most successful singles, "Claire" and "Bad Time to Be Poor".

Vesely announced his departure from the Rheostatics on 8 September 2006. He played his final show with the band on 30 March 2007 at Massey Hall.

He has also released two albums with his own band, The Violet Archers, and plays bass with Great Aunt Ida. Vesely was also a member of L’Étranger, appearing on that band's final album, Sticks and Stones, in 1986.

== See also ==
- Music of Canada
- Canadian rock
- List of Canadian musicians
