= Dave Clark (Canadian musician) =

Canadian musician

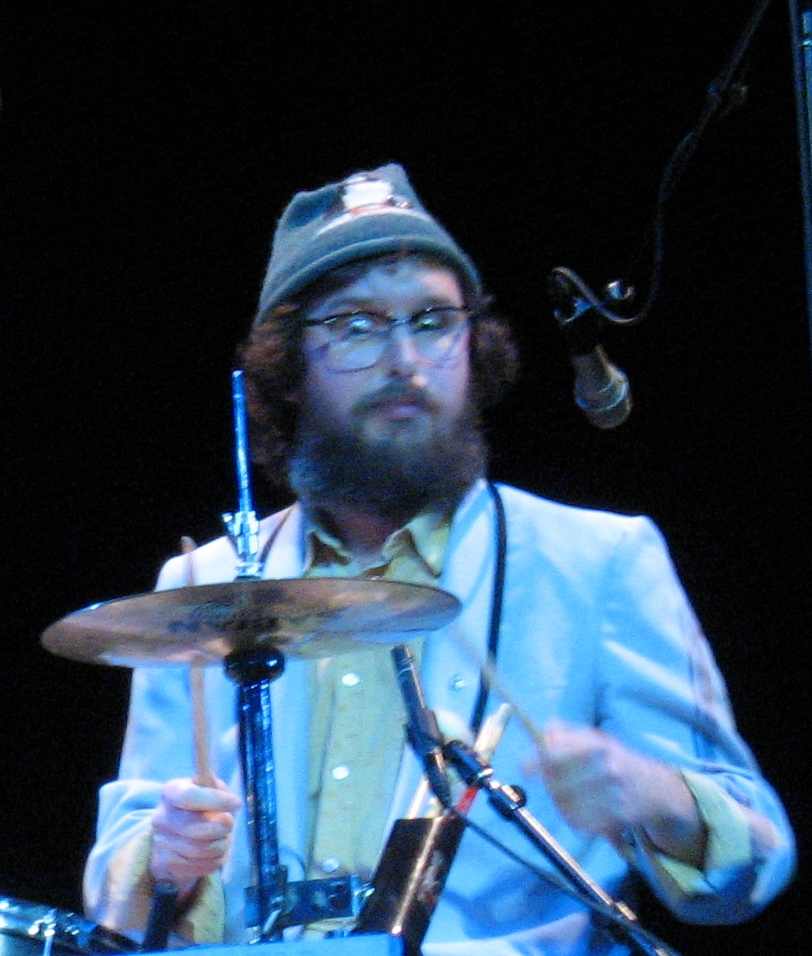
- Dave Clark performing with the Rheostatics at Massey Hall in Toronto, Ontario, 2007

Background information
- Born: David J. Clark
- Origin: Etobicoke, Ontario, Canada
- Genres: Indie rock
- Occupations: Musician, composer, poet, record producer
- Instruments: Drum kit, percussion, guitar, bass, keyboards, tuba, trumpet
- Years active: 1980–present
- Website: www.woodchoppers.com/davidjclark

David J. Clark is a Canadian musician from Etobicoke, Ontario.

== Biography ==
Clark is a respected studio musician and live performer, and has collaborated with such artists as Charles Spearin, Gord Downie, The Inbreds, Jane Siberry, Julie Doiron, and the Sun Ra Arkestra. He is perhaps best known for playing drums in the indie rock band Rheostatics from 1980–1995, and again 2016 onwards. In addition to playing drums for the Rheostatics, Clark would often contribute backing vocals and occasionally write and sing his own songs; a notable example is "Full Moon over Russia" from Introducing Happiness. Following his departure from the group in 1995, Clark concentrated on his band The Dinner Is Ruined, and formed The WoodChopper's Association, a multi-disciplinary artist collective. He has also released two solo albums, Dave Clark and Sketchbook #2.

Clark began playing music during childhood, and was playing his first gigs by age fourteen. He studied music for one semester at Humber College. Clark has taught drumming and organized workshops and arts performances throughout Ontario for more than 20 years. He heads a loose collective of drummers in Samba Punk Sound System as well as a group of horn, woodwind, guitar and rhythm players since 2005 as The Woodshed Orchestra. He published a book of poetry entitled A Month of Sundays.
