= Sloan discography =

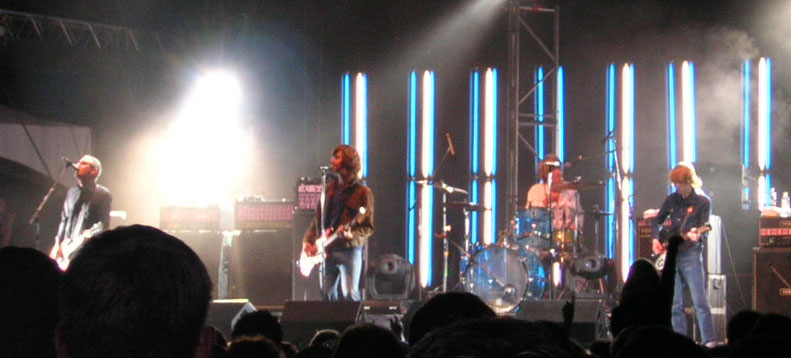
- Sloan performing at Olympic Island in Toronto, Ontario, 2004
- Studio albums: 14
- Extended plays: 2
- Live albums: 2
- Compilation albums: 3
- Singles: 31
- Music videos: 20

This is the discography of Sloan, a Canadian rock band from Halifax, Nova Scotia.

== Studio albums ==
Year	Title	Peak chart positions		Certifications
Year	Title	CAN	US Heatseekers	CAN
1992	Smeared	72	–	Gold
1994	Twice Removed	25	–	Gold
1996	One Chord to Another	15	–	Gold
1998	Navy Blues	5	–	Gold
1999	Between the Bridges	17	–	
2001	Pretty Together	12	–	
2003	Action Pact	11	–	
2006	Never Hear the End of It	29	48	
2008	Parallel Play	16	35	
2011	The Double Cross	32	15	
2014	Commonwealth	41	13	
2018	12	44	11	
2022	Steady	–	–	
2025	Based on the Best Seller	–	×	

== EPs ==
Year	Title	Chart positions	
Year	Title	CAN	Billboard Heatseekers
1992	Peppermint EP	–	–
2009	Hit & Run	–	–
2015	Alternates	–	–
2020	B Sides Win, Vol. 1: 1992–1997	–	–

== Live albums ==
Year	Title	Chart positions	Certifications
Year	Title	CAN	CRIA
1997	Recorded Live at a Sloan Party	–	
1999	4 Nights at the Palais Royale	35	
2011	Is That All I Get? Recorded September 20, 1993 (limited edition vinyl)	–	
2012	Australia 1999 (limited edition vinyl)	–	
2013	Tokyo, Japan 2002 (limited edition vinyl)	–	
2023	Alive & Alright (limited edition vinyl)	–	

== Compilations ==
Year	Title	Chart positions	Certifications
Year	Title	CAN	CRIA
1992	Back to the Garden: A Tribute to Joni Mitchell: "A Case of You" (Joni Mitchell cover)	–	
1993	Never Mind the Molluscs: "Pillow Fight"	–	
1994	DGC Rarities Vol. 1: "Stove/Smother" (Eric's Trip cover)	–	
2001	Listen to What the Man Said: Popular Artists Pay Tribute to the Music of Paul McCartney: "Waterfalls" (Paul McCartney cover) – 4:18	–	
2002	FUBAR: The Album: "In the Mood" (Rush cover)	–	
2005	A Sides Win: Singles 1992-2005	15	
2010	B Sides Win: extras, bonus tracks and b-sides 1992-2008	–	
2011	Select Singles: 1992–2011	–	

== Guest appearances ==
Year	Title	Chart positions		Certifications
Year	Title	CAN	Billboard Heatseekers	CRIA
2007	Alone: The Home Recordings of Rivers Cuomo: (features a cover of Dion's "Little Diane" with Sloan playing their usual instruments and Cuomo on vocals)	–	–	

== Singles ==
Year	Title	Peak chart position						Album
Year	Title	CAN	CAN Alt	CAN Rock	CAN Mod	CAN Content (Cancon)	US Mod	Album
1992	"Underwhelmed"	—	×		×	1	25	Smeared
1993	"Sugartune"	—	×		×	4	—	Smeared
1993	"500 Up"	—	×		×	—	—	Smeared
1993	"Take It In"	—	×		×	—	—	Smeared
1993	"I Am the Cancer"	—	×		×	—	—	Smeared
1994	"Coax Me"	30	×		×	6	—	Twice Removed
1994	"Penpals"	—	×		×	—	—	Twice Removed
1994	"People of the Sky"	58	×		×	4	—	Twice Removed
1994	"I Hate My Generation"	—	×		×	—	—	Twice Removed
1995	"Same Old Flame" / "Stood Up"	—	×		×	×	—	Non-album single
1996	"The Good in Everyone"	9	7		×	×	—	One Chord to Another
1996	"Everything You've Done Wrong"	6	—		×	×	—	One Chord to Another
1996	"The Lines You Amend"	39	12		×	×	—	One Chord to Another
1997	"G Turns to D"	—	—		×	×	—	One Chord to Another
1998	"Money City Maniacs"	7	4		×	×	—	Navy Blues
1998	"She Says What She Means"	—	21		×	×	—	Navy Blues
1998	"Keep on Thinkin"	85	—		×	×	—	Navy Blues
1999	"Losing California"	—	18		×	×	—	Between the Bridges
1999	"Friendship"	—	—		×	×	—	Between the Bridges
2000	"Sensory Deprivation"	—	—		×	×	—	Between the Bridges
2000	"Don’t You Believe a Word"	—	—		×	×	—	Between the Bridges
2001	"If It Feels Good Do It"	—	×	×	×	×	—	Pretty Together
2002	"The Other Man"	18	×	×	×	×	—	Pretty Together
2003	"The Rest of My Life"	—	×	×	×	×	—	Action Pact
2003	"Live On"	—	×	×	×	×	—	Action Pact
2004	"Nothing Lasts Forever Anymore"	—	×	×	×	×	—	Action Pact
2005	"All Used Up"	—	×	5	×	×	—	A Sides Win: Singles 1992–2005
2006	"Who Taught You to Live Like That?"	—	—	9	×	×	—	Never Hear the End of It
2006	"Ill Placed Trust"	—	—	27	×	×	—	Never Hear the End of It
2007	"I've Gotta Try"	—	—	—	×	×	—	Never Hear the End of It
2008	"Believe in Me"	—	—	6	×	×	—	Parallel Play
2008	"I'm Not a Kid Anymore"	—	—	43	×	×	—	Parallel Play
2009	"Witch's Wand"	—	—	—	×	×	—	Parallel Play
2009	"Take It Upon Yourself"	—	—	—	×	×	—	Hit & Run
2011	"Unkind"	—	16	9	×	×	—	The Double Cross
2011	"The Answer Was You"	—	32	—	×	×	—	The Double Cross
2013	"Jenny" / "It's in You, It's in Me"	—	—	—	×	×	—	Non-album single
2014	"Keep Swinging (Downtown)"	—	—	43	×	×	—	Commonwealth
2018	"Spin Our Wheels"	—	—	31	×	×	—	12
2022	"Scratch the Surface"	—	—	31	×	×	—	Steady
2025	"I Love This Town"	—	—	—	—	×	—	Songs from the Gang
2025	"Dream Destroyer"	—	—	—	34	×	—	Based on the Best Seller
"—" denotes releases that did not chart. "×" denotes periods where charts did not exist or were not archived.
