= A Sides Win: Singles 1992–2005 =

Greatest hits album by Sloan
- Released: May 3, 2005
- Recorded: 1992–2005
- Genre: Rock
- Length: 54:54
- Label: Sony / BMG (Canada); Koch (US)
- Producer: Sloan

Sloan chronology
| Action Pact (2003) | A Sides Win: Singles 1992–2005 (2005) | Never Hear the End of It (2006) |

Professional ratings
Review scores
| Source | Rating |
|---|---|
| Allmusic | 4.5/5 stars |
| CHARTattack | 4.5/5 stars |
| Pitchfork | 7.9/10 |

A Sides Win: Singles 1992–2005 is a compilation album by Canadian power pop quartet Sloan. It was released on May 3, 2005, and debuted at #15 on the Canadian Albums Chart.

The album is a compilation of 14 previously released singles, plus two new songs, "All Used Up" and "Try to Make It". A special version of the album also contains a second disc, a DVD containing the music videos of each of the songs, plus interviews and other material.

The album's title is a play on "A Side Wins", a song on Sloan's 1996 release One Chord to Another.

== Track listing ==
1. "Underwhelmed" (Chris Murphy; from Smeared) – 4:45
2. "500 Up" (Andrew Scott; from Smeared) – 4:16
3. "Coax Me" (Chris Murphy; from Twice Removed) – 3:26
4. "People of the Sky" (Andrew Scott; from Twice Removed) – 3:38
5. "The Good in Everyone" (Patrick Pentland; from One Chord to Another) – 2:08
6. "Everything You've Done Wrong" (Patrick Pentland; from One Chord to Another) – 3:27
7. "The Lines You Amend" (Jay Ferguson; from One Chord to Another) – 2:32
8. "Money City Maniacs" (Patrick Pentland; from Navy Blues) – 3:54
9. "She Says What She Means" (Chris Murphy; from Navy Blues) – 3:01
10. "Losing California" (Patrick Pentland; from Between the Bridges) – 3:06
11. "Friendship" (Patrick Pentland; from Between the Bridges) – 3:25
12. "If It Feels Good Do It" (Patrick Pentland; from Pretty Together) – 3:56
13. "The Other Man" (Chris Murphy; from Pretty Together) – 3:53
14. "The Rest of My Life" (Chris Murphy; from Action Pact) – 2:46
15. "All Used Up" (Patrick Pentland; new song) – 2:49
16. "Try to Make It" (Chris Murphy; new song) – 3:44

B-sides

- "I Thought I Was Ready for You" (Jay Ferguson; Japan import)
- "Tell Me Something I Don't Know" (Chris Murphy; Japan import)
