= 4 Nights at the Palais Royale =

Live album by Sloan
- Released: April 20, 1999
- Genre: Rock
- Length: 113:26
- Label: Murderecords

Sloan chronology
Navy Blues (1998)	4 Nights at the Palais Royale (1999)	Between the Bridges (1999)

Professional ratings
Review scores
Source	Rating
AllMusic	3/5 stars

4 Nights at the Palais Royale is a live album released by the Canadian rock band Sloan in 1999. It was mostly recorded from four live shows performed at the Palais Royale in Toronto, Ontario in 1998, although some of the songs were taken from other concerts on their 1998 Navy Blues tour. The band and fans alike consider it a fairly accurate representation of a typical Sloan concert, with a mix of old and new songs and plenty of audience participation.

== Track listing ==
Disc One
No.	Title	Length
1.	"She Says What She Means"	4:11
2.	"The Good in Everyone"	2:09
3.	"Coax Me"	4:00
4.	"The Lines You Amend"	2:46
5.	"Marcus Said"	5:44
6.	"Seems So Heavy"	4:43
7.	"Sinking Ships"	4:37
8.	"Everything You've Done Wrong"	4:00
9.	"Keep on Thinkin'"	3:01
10.	"Snowsuit Sound"	3:41
11.	"Suppose They Close the Door"	3:38
12.	"Iggy and Angus"	3:16
13.	"Bells On"	4:10
14.	"Anyone Who's Anyone"	3:38

Disc Two
No.	Title	Length
1.	"People of the Sky"	3:32
2.	"400 Metres"	4:27
3.	"On The Horizon"	4:50
4.	"I Wanna Thank You"	3:41
5.	"G Turns to D"	3:37
6.	"Penpals"	3:07
7.	"Money City Maniacs"	7:26
8.	"Deeper Than Beauty"	3:07
9.	"I Am the Cancer"	4:13
10.	"I Can Feel It"	3:34
11.	"Torn"	3:39
12.	"Nothing Left to Make Me Want to Stay"	2:44
13.	"Before I Do"	5:05
14.	"Underwhelmed"	6:50

== Personnel ==
=== Sloan ===
- Chris Murphy – bass guitar, drums, vocals
- Andrew Scott – drums, guitar, vocals
- Patrick Pentland – guitar, vocals
- Jay Ferguson – guitar, vocals

=== Additional musicians ===
- Ben Gunning – guitar (on "Underwhelmed")
