= Recorded Live at a Sloan Party =

Recorded Live at a Sloan Party!

Studio album by Sloan
- Released: February 12, 1997
- Recorded: November, 1996
- Studio: Idea Of East Recording, Halifax, Nova Scotia
- Genre: Rock, power pop
- Producer: Laurence Currie, Sloan

Sloan chronology
One Chord to Another (1996)	Recorded Live at a Sloan Party! (1997)	Navy Blues (1998)

Recorded Live at a Sloan Party! was a rare album release by Sloan; it was released in the United States in February 1997 as a bonus album to March Records' release of One Chord to Another. It was also packaged with initial US pressings of One Chord to Another through The Enclave label, and was later released in Japan in a one-disc package with One Chord to Another on Universal Records.

Although the album is called Recorded Live at a Sloan Party!, and background noises and conversations between the songs suggest that the album was recorded during a party attended by Sloan and friends (including Jennifer Pierce from the band Jale, and Joel Plaskett), the four members of Sloan now admit that the album was recorded in a studio. The background noises were in fact recorded at a party where Sloan and friends were present, at Cafe Mokka in Halifax, but the noises were simply dubbed over the music. The gimmick is given away in the middle of the "On the Road Again/Transona Five" medley, where Jay Ferguson "walks outside" and talks to an over-enthusiastic fan in the middle of the song. Guitarist Patrick Pentland de-mystified the Party Album on the official site, letting fans know the truth about the studio recordings.

Conceptually, the album is intentionally similar to The Beach Boys' 1965 album Beach Boys' Party!. According to the band, the idea behind recording the album was that because One Chord to Another was released in the US several months after it was released in Canada, The Enclave wanted to package it with bonus material to help sales, since they presumed that many of the band's American fans would already have bought the imported Canadian release.

In 2016, Sloan released a four-disc 20th-anniversary One Chord to Another box set, featuring Recorded Live at a Sloan Party! as the third record. This release had new album art similar to that of the Beach Boys record.

== Track listing ==
1. "Let's Get the Party Started" (Sloan) – 2:28
2. "I Can Feel It" (Patrick Pentland/Sloan) – 3:54 (new version; original version on Twice Removed)
3. "Dignified and Old" (Jonathan Richman) – 3:12 (originally performed by The Modern Lovers)
4. "Glitter and Gold" (Barry Mann/Cynthia Weil) – 3:02 (originally performed by The Turtles, and later, The Everly Brothers)
5. "Over You" (Bryan Ferry/Phil Manzanera) – 3:20 (originally performed by Roxy Music)
6. "I Am the Cancer" (Chris Murphy/Sloan) – 3:22 (new version; original version on Smeared)
7. "I Can't Let Go" (Al Gorgoni/Chip Taylor) – 2:35 (originally performed by Evie Sands, and later, The Hollies)
8. "Stood Up" (Matthew Grimson) – 3:28 (originally performed by Matthew Grimson)
9. "On the Road Again/Transona Five" (Tim Gane/Floyd Jones/Lætitia Sadier/Alan Wilson) – 4:42 (originally performed by Canned Heat and Stereolab, respectively)
10. "I Wouldn't Want to Lose Your Love" (Myles Goodwyn) – 5:45 (originally performed by April Wine)

== Notes ==
- Track 1 is only party sounds
- Track 2 is sung by Patrick Pentland and Jennifer Pierce
- Track 3 is sung by Chris Murphy
- Track 4 is sung by Andrew Scott
- Track 5 is sung by Jay Ferguson
- Track 6 is sung by Chris Murphy
- Track 7 is sung by Jay Ferguson
- Track 8 is sung by Chris Murphy
- Track 9 is sung by Jay Ferguson
- Track 10 is sung by Patrick Pentland
- The last 2:35 of track 10 is more party sounds
