= Based on the Best Seller =

Studio album by Sloan
- Released: September 26, 2025
- Recorded: 2024–2025
- Studios: The Bunker, Toronto by Ryan Haslett; Taurus Studio, Toronto by Thomas Darcy; Chris's garage, Toronto, by Cam Loeppky
- Genre: Power pop
- Length: 38:18
- Labels: Yep Roc; Murderecords
- Producers: Ryan Haslett; Sloan

Sloan chronology
Steady (2022)	Based on the Best Seller (2025)

Singles from Based on the Best Seller
- 1. "Dream Destroyer" Released: July 21, 2025

Based on the Best Seller is the fourteenth studio album by Canadian rock band Sloan. It was released on September 26, 2025, via Yep Roc and the group's label Murderecords. The album was recorded at The Bunker, and Taurus Studio, both in Toronto, with additional recording done in Chris Murphy's garage, also in Toronto.

Two of the songs featured on the LP, "Baxter" and "Open Your Umbrellas", were repurposed songs originally recorded in demo form in Toronto in 1995 (during the One Chord To Another sessions), and in Halifax in August 1997 (during the Navy Blues sessions), respectively.

The song "No Damn Fears" draws inspiration from Jellyfishbabies, and the title is in reference to Andrew Scott's pre-Sloan band of the same name, which featured Jennifer Pierce and Dave Marsh.

== Track listing ==
All songs credited to Sloan.

No.	Title	Writer(s)	Length
1.	"Capitol Cooler"	Jay Ferguson	3:14
2.	"Dream Destroyer"	Patrick Pentland	3:54
3.	"Open Your Umbrellas"	Chris Murphy	2:12
4.	"Baxter"	Andrew Scott	2:53
5.	"Congratulations"	Ferguson	2:25
6.	"Live Forever"	Murphy	3:27
7.	"So Far Down"	Pentland	2:54
8.	"Fortune Teller"	Murphy	3:25
9.	"No Damn Fears"	Scott	4:22
10.	"Collect Yourself"	Ferguson	2:43
11.	"Here We Go Again"	Pentland	3:27
12.	"I Already Know"	Murphy	3:22
Total length:			38:18

== Personnel ==
Credits adapted from Tidal.

=== Sloan ===
- Jay Ferguson – guitar, production, mixing (all tracks); vocals (tracks 1, 5, 10)
- Chris Murphy – bass guitar, production, mixing (all tracks); background vocals (1, 2, 5, 7, 9–11), vocals (3, 6, 8, 12)
- Patrick Pentland – guitar, production, mixing (all tracks); vocals (2, 7, 11), background vocals (3, 6, 8, 12)
- Andrew Scott – drums, production, mixing (all tracks); vocals (4, 9)

=== Additional contributors ===
- Ryan Haslett – production, mixing, engineering
- João Carvalho – mastering
- Cam Loeppky – engineering
- Thomas Darcy – engineering
- Gregory Macdonald – background vocals, keyboards, percussion
- Tom Moffett – trumpet (8)
