= Action Pact (album) =

Studio album by Sloan
- Released: August 19, 2003
- Recorded: February–April 2003
- Genres: Rock, power pop
- Length: 38:47
- Labels: RCA, Murderecords
- Producer: Tom Rothrock

Sloan chronology
Pretty Together (2001)	Action Pact (2003)	A Sides Win: Singles 1992-2005 (2005)

Professional ratings
Review scores
Source	Rating
AllMusic	4/5 stars
CHARTattack	3/5 stars
Pitchfork	6.9/10

Action Pact is the seventh album by Canadian rock band Sloan. The album was named after "Youth Action Pact," a song by the 1980s Halifax band Jellyfishbabies. Action Pact was released on August 19, 2003 by ViK Recordings. The album does not include any songs written by Andrew Scott, and is therefore the only Sloan album that does not include at least one track written by each band member. The album debuted at #11 on the Canadian Albums Chart. Action Pact was nominated for "Favourite New Album" at the 2003 CASBY Awards.

== Track listing ==
All songs credited to Sloan.

1. "Gimme That" (Chris Murphy) – 2:39
2. "Live On" (Patrick Pentland) – 3:11
3. "Backstabbin'" (Patrick Pentland) – 2:51
4. "The Rest of My Life" (Chris Murphy) – 2:45
5. "False Alarm" (Jay Ferguson) – 3:47
6. "Nothing Lasts Forever Anymore" (Chris Murphy) – 3:18
7. "Hollow Head" (Patrick Pentland) – 3:37
8. "Ready for You" (Chris Murphy) – 2:07
9. "I Was Wrong" (Patrick Pentland) – 2:52
10. "Who Loves Life More?" (Chris Murphy) – 3:26
11. "Reach Out" (Patrick Pentland) – 3:28
12. "Fade Away" (Jay Ferguson) – 4:46

B-sides

- "Will You Ever Love Me Again?" (Chris Murphy) (US import)
- "Step on It, Jean" (Jay Ferguson) (US import, 7" single)
- "Dirty Nails" (written by Temple Bates/Amy Bowles, and originally performed by Pony Da Look) ("Step on It, Jean" 7" single)

== Singles ==
- "The Rest of My Life" (2003)
- "Live On" (2003)
- "Nothing Lasts Forever Anymore" (2004)
