= Who Taught You to Live Like That? =

Single by Sloan

from the album Never Hear the End of It
- Released: 2006
- Genre: Blues rock
- Length: 3:02
- Label: murderecords
- Songwriter(s): Jay Ferguson, Sloan

Sloan singles chronology
"All Used Up" (2005)	"Who Taught You to Live Like That?" (2006)	"Ill Placed Trust" (2006)

"Who Taught You to Live Like That?" is a song by Canadian rock band Sloan. It was released as the lead single from the band's eighth studio album, Never Hear the End of It. This was Jay Ferguson's first single since "The Lines You Amend." It was used as the theme song to the television series MVP. The song peaked at #9 on Billboard's Canada Rock chart.
