= Steady (album) =

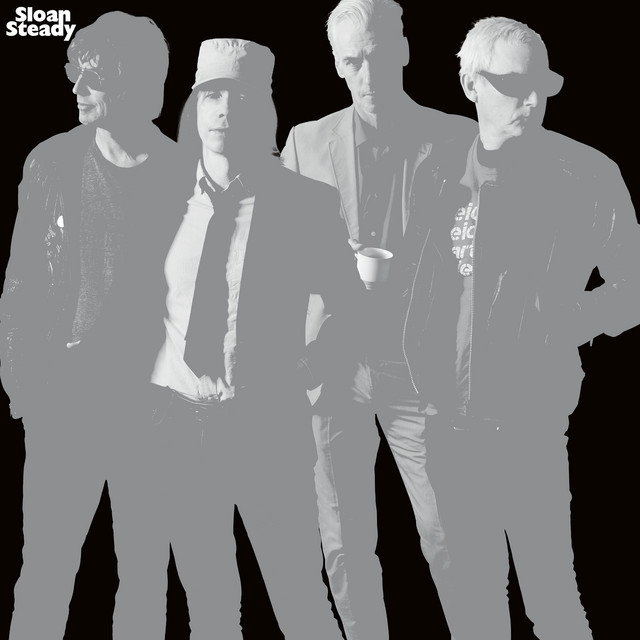

Studio album by Sloan
- Released: October 21, 2022
- Recorded: 2020–2021
- Studio: Giant Studio (Toronto); Sloan Studio (Toronto); The Bunker (Toronto)
- Length: 36:26
- Label: Murderecords, Yep Roc Records
- Producer: Sloan, Ryan Haslett

Sloan chronology
12 (2018)	Steady (2022)	Based on the Best Seller (2025)

Singles from Steady
- 1. "Spend the Day" Released: July 13, 2022; 2. "Scratch the Surface" Released: August 17, 2022; 3. "Magical Thinking" Released: September 21, 2022; 4. "Dream It All Over Again" Released: October 19, 2022

Professional ratings
Review scores
Source	Rating
Pitchfork	7.1/10
Popmatters	7
The Spill Magazine	4.5/5 stars

Steady is the thirteenth studio album by Canadian rock band Sloan.

== Recording ==
Due to the COVID-19 pandemic, drums for the album were recorded on a 4-track cassette recorder in 2020 at the Sloan Studio in Toronto. The remainder of the album was recorded at Giant Studio and The Bunker in Toronto, Canada. The band previously used a 4-track to record drums for their 1996 album, One Chord to Another, as drummer Andrew Scott had moved to Toronto while the rest of the band remained in their native Halifax.

== Track listing ==
Steady track listing
No.	Title	Length
1.	"Magical Thinking" (Chris Murphy)	3:41
2.	"Spend the Day" (Patrick Pentland)	2:31
3.	"She Put Up with What She Put Down" (Jay Ferguson)	2:33
4.	"Human Nature" (Murphy)	2:42
5.	"Scratch the Surface" (Pentland)	2:56
6.	"Panic on Runnymede" (Andrew Scott)	2:35
7.	"Dream It All Over Again" (Ferguson/Murphy)	3:34
8.	"Nice Work If You Can Get It" (Murphy)	3:18
9.	"Simply Leaving" (Pentland)	3:12
10.	"Close Encounters" (Scott)	3:52
11.	"I Dream of Sleep" (Murphy)	2:13
12.	"Keep Your Name Alive" (Ferguson)	3:42
