= The Good in Everyone =

Single by Sloan

from the album One Chord to Another
- Released: 1996
- Genre: Rock, power pop
- Length: 2:17 (Album version); 2:09 (Radio edit)
- Label: murderecords, The Enclave
- Songwriter(s): Patrick Pentland, Sloan

Sloan singles chronology
"I Hate My Generation" (1994)	"The Good in Everyone" (1996)	"Everything You've Done Wrong" (1996)

Music video
- "The Good In Everyone" on YouTube

"The Good in Everyone" is a song by Canadian rock band Sloan. It was released as the lead single from the band's third studio album, One Chord to Another. The song peaked at #9 on Canada's Singles Chart, and continues to be one of the band's most popular songs.

The song is featured on the first edition of MuchMusic's Big Shiny Tunes compilation series and was also the theme for the CBC television program George Stroumboulopoulos Tonight.

== Background ==
There are two versions of "The Good in Everyone"; the album version and the radio version. The album version begins with Neil "Brother Bill" Morrison (a DJ at Toronto's CFNY-FM radio station) saying "Would you please welcome to the stage...Sloan!", with screams from fans included. The introduction is from a recording of Sloan's concert at the Molson Amphitheatre on August 5, 1995.

The album version ends with more fan screams from the concert recording. The radio version removes the introduction of the band and the fan screams and features two additional singings of the chorus at the end of the song.

Songwriter Patrick Pentland says the song's opening was inspired by "New Rose" by The Damned.

== Music video ==
The music video for "The Good In Everyone" was filmed at Toronto Pearson International Airport (on Convair Drive at the southwest end of runway 06L/24R at 43°39′35.2″N 79°37′31.1″W) and directed by Mike Andringa, who would later direct several more music videos for Sloan. The video's introductory scene is a spoof of the 1969 film, Easy Rider. In the scene, each band member plays a character from the film, with Andrew Scott playing Billy (Dennis Hopper), Chris Murphy playing Wyatt (Peter Fonda), Jay Ferguson playing Connection (Phil Spector) and Patrick Pentland playing the Bodyguard. The entire introductory scene before the music begins is longer than the song itself.

The music video received play on MTV's 120 Minutes.

== Track list ==
7"

- A: The Good In Everyone
- B: Autobiography (demo)

== Charts ==
=== Weekly charts ===
Chart (1996)	Peak position
Canada Top Singles (RPM)	9
Canada Rock/Alternative (RPM)	7

=== Year-end charts ===
Chart (1996)	Position
Canada Top Singles (RPM)	73
Canada Rock/Alternative (RPM)	49
