= The Double Cross =

Studio album by Sloan
- Released: May 10, 2011
- Recorded: August – November, 2010
- Genre: Rock, alternative rock, power pop
- Length: 34:02
- Label: Murderecords, Outside Music, Yep Roc Records
- Producer: Sloan, Ryan Haslett, Gregory Macdonald

Sloan chronology
Hit & Run (2009)	The Double Cross (2011)	Commonwealth (2014)

Singles from The Double Cross
- 1. "Unkind" Released: March 29, 2011

Professional ratings
Review scores
Source	Rating
Allmusic	3.5/5 stars
Rolling Stone	3/5 stars
Pitchfork Media	(8.1/10)

The Double Cross is the tenth studio album by Canadian rock band Sloan. The title of the album is a nod to their 20th (or XX) anniversary. At a length of 34 minutes, it is Sloan's shortest album to date. It is also the band's first album to be released on the Outside Music label.

The album was named as a longlisted nominee for the 2011 Polaris Music Prize. The album was also nominated for "Rock Album of the Year" at the 2012 Juno Awards.

== Promotion and release ==
The band first announced plans to release the album in 2011, to coincide with the 20th anniversary of their first show. The album's lead-off track, "Follow the Leader", was the first song released from the album as an online giveaway track. The album's lead single, "Unkind", was released on March 29.

== Track listing ==
All songs were written and performed by Sloan.

1. "Follow the Leader" – 2:56 (Murphy)
2. "The Answer Was You" – 2:18 (Ferguson)
3. "Unkind" – 4:15 (Pentland)
4. "Shadow of Love" – 2:04 (Murphy)
5. "She's Slowing Down Again" – 3:05 (Scott)
6. "Green Gardens, Cold Montreal" – 2:01 (Ferguson)
7. "It's Plain to See" – 1:57 (Pentland)
8. "Your Daddy Will Do" – 3:04 (Murphy)
9. "I've Gotta Know" – 1:22 (Pentland)
10. "Beverly Terrace" – 3:01 (Ferguson)
11. "Traces" – 4:58 (Scott)
12. "Laying So Low" – 2:57 (Murphy)/(Pentland)
13. "Then Again" (iTunes Bonus Track) – 3:18 (Murphy)
14. "Jesus Loves Me" (Pre-Order Only iTunes Bonus Track) – 2:52 (Pentland)
