= 12 (Sloan album) =

Studio album by Sloan
- Released: April 6, 2018
- Recorded: Sloan Studios, Toronto, Ontario, Canada, March – November 2017
- Genres: Rock, alternative rock, power pop
- Length: 40:44
- Labels: Murderecords, Yep Roc
- Producers: Sloan, Ryan Haslett

Sloan chronology
Commonwealth (2014)	12 (2018)	Steady (2022)

Singles from 12
- 1. "Spin Our Wheels" Released: 2018

Professional ratings
Review scores
Source	Rating
AllMusic	4/5 stars
Exclaim!	8/10
The Line of Best Fit	9/10
No Ripcord	7/10
Paste	7.8/10

12 is the twelfth studio album by Canadian rock band Sloan. The album debuted at #11 on the Billboard Heatseekers chart, which is the band's highest position on that chart in their history.

== Track listing ==
No.	Title	Length
1.	"Spin Our Wheels" (Chris Murphy)	3:39
2.	"All of the Voices" (Patrick Pentland)	2:52
3.	"Right to Roam" (Jay Ferguson)	2:45
4.	"Gone for Good" (Andrew Scott)	3:28
5.	"The Day Will Be Mine" (Pentland)	3:15
6.	"Essential Services" (Ferguson)	4:06
7.	"Don't Stop (If It Feels Good Do It)" (Murphy)	3:34
8.	"Year Zero" (Scott)	3:37
9.	"Have Faith" (Pentland)	3:19
10.	"The Lion's Share" (Ferguson)	2:40
11.	"Wish Upon a Satellite" (Murphy)	3:38
12.	"44 Teenagers" (Scott)	3:51

== Charts ==
Chart (2018)	Peak position
Canadian Albums (Billboard)	44
US Heatseekers Albums (Billboard)	11
US Independent Albums (Billboard)	29
