= Commonwealth (Sloan album) =

Studio album by Sloan
- Released: September 9, 2014
- Recorded: Sloan Studios, Toronto, Ontario, Canada
- Length: 58:22
- Labels: Murderecords, Yep Roc Records
- Producers: Sloan, Ryan Haslett, Gregory Macdonald

Sloan chronology
| The Double Cross (2011) | Commonwealth (2014) | 12 (2018) |

Singles from Commonwealth
- 1. "Keep Swinging (Downtown)" Released: July 14, 2014

Professional ratings
Aggregate scores
| Source | Rating |
|---|---|
| Metacritic | 74/100 |
Review scores
| Source | Rating |
| Allmusic | 4/5 stars |
| Exclaim! | 7/10 |
| Pitchfork Media | 6.9/10 |
| PopMatters | 7/10 |
| TODAY | 5/5 stars |

Commonwealth is the eleventh studio album by Canadian rock band Sloan.

== Concept and release ==
In 2013, the band revealed plans for a double album, with each of the four sides featuring a solo suite by a different band member. In May 2014, it was announced that the new album would be titled Commonwealth and would be released in September 2014. On July 14, 2014, the band announced the official release date for the album (September 9) and released the album's lead single, "Keep Swinging (Downtown)". The album's cover was simultaneously released, which portrays the band members as four-of-a-kind kings. The suits of these playing cards correspond to the titles of their solo sides: Jay Ferguson's side is called Diamonds, Chris Murphy's is Hearts, Patrick Pentland's is Clubs, and Andrew Scott's is Spades.

== Track listing ==
Each suite is written and performed by its respective band member.

Diamond (Ferguson):
| No. | Title | Length |
|---|---|---|
| 1. | "We've Come This Far" | 1:23 |
| 2. | "You've Got a Lot on Your Mind" | 3:27 |
| 3. | "Three Sisters" | 3:49 |
| 4. | "Cleopatra" | 2:41 |
| 5. | "Neither Here Nor There" | 2:11 |

Heart (Murphy):
| No. | Title | Length |
|---|---|---|
| 6. | "Carried Away" | 3:36 |
| 7. | "So Far So Good" | 3:13 |
| 8. | "Get Out" | 1:40 |
| 9. | "Misty's Beside Herself" | 2:49 |
| 10. | "You Don't Need Excuses to Be Good" | 3:42 |

Shamrock (Pentland):
| No. | Title | Length |
|---|---|---|
| 11. | "13 (Under a Bad Sign)" | 2:00 |
| 12. | "Take It Easy" | 2:32 |
| 13. | "What's Inside" | 3:52 |
| 14. | "Keep Swinging (Downtown)" | 3:38 |

Spade (Scott):
| No. | Title | Length |
|---|---|---|
| 15. | "Forty-Eight Portraits" | 17:49 |
