= Will Currie and the Country French =

Will Currie & The Country French

Background information
- Origin: Waterloo, Ontario, Canada
- Genres: Indie rock, piano pop
- Years active: 2006–present
- Labels: Murderecords; File Under: Music
- Members: Will Currie; Dan Beacock; Daniel MacPherson; Aaron Mariash
- Website: thecountryfrench.com

Will Currie & The Country French is a Canadian indie rock music group formed in 2006 in Waterloo. The band consists of singer and pianist Will Currie, guitarist Dan Beacock, drummer Aaron Mariash, and bassist Daniel MacPherson.

== Biography ==
Will Currie & The Country French was originally conceived in early 2006 as a few songs were written in a small glass room in the basement of the Music Faculty at Wilfrid Laurier University. Currie later assembled a small troupe of fellow music students to form a piano pop band. They began to tour around southern Ontario, and in 2007 caught the attention of Jay Ferguson of Sloan, who said they were the best live band he had seen that year, and signed them to his Murderecords music label.

Their debut EP, A Great Stage, was released in early 2008 by Murderecords. They toured western Canada with Sloan in September 2008. The two bands together recorded Will Currie's composition "Push Pins" in 2008, in which Currie duets with Jay Ferguson on vocals.

"Push Pins" won a 2008 CBC Radio 3 Bucky Award for Best Collaboration.

The band released Awake! You Sleepers, under the label File Under: Music in 2011, and has played across Canada with artists such as Arkells, Dan Mangan, Said the Whale, Our Lady Peace, Library Voices, and Zeus.

Their next record, They Killed Us, was released via File Under: Music in June 2015.

== Discography ==
=== LPs ===
- Awake, You Sleepers! (11 October 2011, File Under: Music)
- They Killed Us (9 June 2015, File Under: Music)

=== EPs ===
- A Great Stage (29 April 2008, Murderecords)
