= Between the Bridges =

Studio album by Sloan
- Released: September 21, 1999
- Recorded: May – June 1999 at Chemical Sound Studios, Toronto
- Genre: Rock, power pop
- Length: 45:51
- Label: murderecords
- Producer: Brenndan McGuire, Sloan

Sloan chronology
4 Nights at the Palais Royale (1999)	Between the Bridges (1999)	Pretty Together (2001)

Professional ratings
Review scores
Source	Rating
AllMusic	4/5 stars
The Encyclopedia of Popular Music	4/5 stars
Pitchfork	7.9/10
Rolling Stone	3/5 stars

Between the Bridges is the fifth album by Canadian rock band Sloan. The album was recorded in six weeks and was released in 1999 on Murderecords. The album continued the band's progression towards 1970s-influenced rock mixed with 1960s and 70s influenced pop. The album marks a pivotal move forward for the group, expanding on their influences and featured another successful single in their native Canada, "Losing California".

The album's "quick and photocopy looking" cover art was inspired by a black-and-white photo of the movie poster for the 1969 satirical comedy Putney Swope, which band member Jay Ferguson saw in a book.

== Critical reception ==
The A.V. Club wrote that "though many dismissed the album as creatively arrested, its suite-like construction and autobiographical structure makes it Sloan's most fully realized effort." Exclaim! called the album "a pop thrill from start to finish." The Washington Post wrote that "the fact that all four musicians both write and sing gives the sound breadth, yet at no cost to cohesiveness."

Between the Bridges was voted as the third best Canadian album of 1999 by Chart readers. It was also voted as the 19th best album of 1999 by CFNY-FM listeners.

== Commercial performance ==
By October 2001, the album had sold 40,000 copies worldwide.

== Track listing ==
No.	Title	Writer(s)	Length
1.	"The N.S."	Andrew Scott/Sloan	4:37
2.	"So Beyond Me"	Chris Murphy/Sloan	2:53
3.	"Don't You Believe a Word"	Jay Ferguson/Sloan	3:15
4.	"Friendship"	Patrick Pentland/Sloan	3:21
5.	"Sensory Deprivation"	Andrew Scott/Sloan	6:20
6.	"All By Ourselves"	Chris Murphy/Sloan	3:54
7.	"A Long Time Coming"	Patrick Pentland/Sloan	4:33
8.	"Waiting for Slow Songs"	Jay Ferguson/Sloan	3:15
9.	"Losing California"	Patrick Pentland/Sloan	2:56
10.	"The Marquee and the Moon"	Chris Murphy/Sloan	3:09
11.	"Take Good Care of the Poor Boy"	Jay Ferguson/Sloan	3:16
12.	"Delivering Maybes"	Andrew Scott/Sloan	4:22

Japanese bonus tracks

No.	Title	Writer(s)	Length
13.	"At the Edge of the Scene"	Jay Ferguson/Sloan	4:41
14.	"Summer's My Season"	Chris Murphy/Sloan	3:44

B-sides

- "Glad to Be Here" (Patrick Pentland/Sloan) (MuchMusic Edgefest 99 compilation)
