= Losing California =

Single by Sloan

from the album Between the Bridges
- Released: 1999
- Genre: Rock
- Length: 2:56
- Label: murderecords
- Songwriters: Patrick Pentland, Sloan

Sloan singles chronology
"Keep on Thinkin" (1998)	"Losing California" (1999)	"Friendship" (1999)

Music video
- "Losing California" on YouTube

"Losing California" is a song by Canadian rock band Sloan. It was released as the lead single from the band's 1999 album, Between the Bridges. The song peaked at #18 on Canada's Rock chart. Sloan performed the song on a 1999 episode of the NBC television program Late Night with Conan O'Brien. The song was voted as the sixth best song of 1999 by Chart readers.

== Charts ==
=== Weekly charts ===
Chart (1999)	Peak position
Canada Rock/Alternative (RPM)	18
