= Money City Maniacs =

Single by Sloan

from the album Navy Blues
- Released: 1998
- Genre: Rock
- Length: 3:53
- Label: murderecords
- Songwriters: Patrick Pentland, Sloan

Sloan singles chronology
"G Turns to D" (1997)	"Money City Maniacs" (1998)	"She Says What She Means" (1998)

Music video
- "Money City Maniacs" on YouTube

"Money City Maniacs" is a song by Canadian rock band Sloan. It was released as the lead single from the band's 1998 album, Navy Blues. In a 2000 poll conducted by the music magazine Chart, the song was voted the 12th greatest Canadian song of all time. Between 1995 and 2016, "Money City Maniacs" was the eighth most played song by a Canadian artist on rock radio stations in Canada.

== Description ==
The song begins with a repeated siren, followed with a bassline and series of power chords which form the basis of the introduction and verses. The song's chorus describes a practical joke wherein a friend's body is covered in Coke fizz. The bassline of the song bears a resemblance to AC/DC's "Live Wire". The similarity is noted by Patrick Pentland in an interview with Chart magazine.

== Music video ==
The music video for "Money City Maniacs" was directed by Mike Andringa, who previously directed Sloan's music videos for "The Good in Everyone" and "The Lines You Amend." The video consists of the band playing with intermittent freeze frames and faux-red colorization.

== In popular culture ==
- The song is featured on the MuchMusic compilation album, Big Shiny Tunes 3.
- The song is also featured on the compilation album, Frosh 2.
- The song was used in Labatt's television commercials in Canada in the late 1990s.
- The song is featured in an episode of the television show Revolution which was originally broadcast on March 5, 2014.
- A re-recorded version of the song's main riff was used in commercials for Future Shop, a former Canadian electronics retailer.
- The song is featured in the film Goon.
- The song is used as the entrance song for the Halifax Mooseheads.
- The song is used in commercials for Fuze Iced Tea.

== Charts ==
=== Weekly charts ===
Chart (1998)	Peak position
Canada Top Singles (RPM)	7
Canada Rock/Alternative (RPM)	4

=== Year-end charts ===
Chart (1998)	Position
Canada Rock/Alternative (RPM)	33
