= Pony Da Look =

Canadian indie rock band

- Origin: Toronto, Ontario, Canada
- Genres: Indie rock
- Years active: 2001–2011
- Labels: Murderecords
- Members: Temple Bates; Amy Bowles; Catherine Stockhausen; Rob Gordon
- Past members: Rebecca Mendoza

Pony Da Look was an indie rock band from Toronto, Ontario, Canada. The band members were Temple Bates (composer/keyboards/vocals), Amy Bowles (lyrics/vocals/keyboards), Catherine Stockhausen (keyboards/vocals), and Rob Gordon (drums). Former members include Rebecca Mendoza (drums). Their music combined heavy drum beats, raw keyboard riffs and forceful vocals with unconventional lyrics.

== History ==
Bates, Bowles, and Mendoza came together as Pony Da Look and released their first self-titled album in 2001. Tara Azzopardi and Megan Dunlop also played with them in 2001. With the addition of Stockhausen on keyboard, they followed it up with The Forcefield Weakens in 2003.

After Mendoza and Sloan's Chris Murphy celebrated the birth of their child in 2007, Pony Da Look signed to Sloan's label Murderecords and released Shattered Dimensions in 2008. Mendoza left the band and was replaced on drums by Rob Gordon. Pony Da Look continued to perform in the Toronto area until 2011.

Bowles and Bates are painters who continue to exhibit regularly, Mendoza is a modern dancer and choreographer and Stockhausen is a television producer and photographer.

Bowles served as one of the inspirations for the character Envy Adams in Scott Pilgrim v the World.

== Studio albums ==
- 2001: Pony Da Look
- 2003: The Forcefield Weakens
- 2008: Shattered Dimensions
