= Navy Blues (album) =

Studio album by Sloan
- Released: April 28, 1998
- Recorded: November 1997 – January 1998
- Genre: Rock, indie rock
- Length: 46:27
- Label: murderecords
- Producer: Daryl Smith, Sloan

Sloan chronology
Recorded Live at a Sloan Party (1997)	Navy Blues (1998)	4 Nights at the Palais Royale (1999)

Singles from Navy Blues
- 1. "Money City Maniacs" Released: 1998; 2. "She Says What She Means" Released: 1998; 3. "Keep on Thinkin’" Released: 1998

Professional ratings
Review scores
Source	Rating
AllMusic	4/5 stars
Pitchfork	6.3/10

Navy Blues is the fourth studio album by Canadian rock band Sloan. Released on Murderecords in 1998, the album is slightly heavier than their two previous albums, showing an influence from 1970s rock mixed with their usual catchy, melodic, Beatles-esque sound. The album contains arguably their most popular song, "Money City Maniacs," which went on to be used in a beer commercial at the time. The song also became a top 10 hit in the band's native Canada and received heavy radio airplay. Navy Blues was certified Gold in Canada on June 12, 1998. By October 1998, the album had sold more than 70,000 copies. The album was nominated for Best Rock Album at the 1999 Juno Awards.

The album's cover art is a direct copy of the movie poster for the 1959 Polish film Night Train (Polish: Pociąg).

== Track listing ==
All songs credited to Sloan.

No.	Title	Writer(s)	Length
1.	"She Says What She Means"	Chris Murphy	3:01
2.	"C'mon C'mon (We're Gonna Get It Started)"	Jay Ferguson	3:30
3.	"Iggy & Angus"	Patrick Pentland	2:49
4.	"Sinking Ships"	Andrew Scott	4:57
5.	"Keep on Thinkin'"	Chris Murphy	2:32
6.	"Money City Maniacs"	Patrick Pentland/Chris Murphy	3:53
7.	"Seems So Heavy"	Andrew Scott	4:08
8.	"Chester the Molester"	Chris Murphy	3:14
9.	"Stand By Me, Yeah"	Patrick Pentland	3:19
10.	"Suppose They Close the Door"	Chris Murphy/Andrew Scott	3:45
11.	"On the Horizon"	Andrew Scott	4:06
12.	"I Wanna Thank You"	Jay Ferguson	3:58
13.	"I'm Not Through With You Yet"	Patrick Pentland	3:15

Japanese bonus tracks

No.	Title	Writer(s)	Length
14.	"Out to Lunch"	Patrick Pentland	3:37
15.	"Work Cut Out"	Chris Murphy	2:42

B-sides

- "Keep on Thinkin' (acoustic)" ("She Says What She Means" promo)

=== Deluxe reissue ===
LP1 - Navy Blues

1. "She Says What She Means" (Chris Murphy/Sloan) - 3:01
2. "C'mon C'mon(We're Gonna Get It Started)" (Jay Ferguson) - 3:30
3. "Iggy & Angus" (Patrick Pentland) - 2:48
4. "Sinking Ships" (Andrew Scott) - 4:58
5. "Keep on Thinkin'" (Chris Murphy) - 2:32
6. "Money City Maniacs" (Patrick Pentland/Chris Murphy) - 3:53
7. "Seems so Heavy" (Andrew Scott) - 4:08
8. "Chester the Molester" (Chris Murphy) - 3:14
9. "Stand By Me, Yeah" (Patrick Pentland) - 3:19
10. "Suppose They Close the Door" (Chris Murphy/Andrew Scott) - 3:45
11. "On the Horizon" (Andrew Scott) - 4:04
12. "I Wanna Thank You" (Jay Ferguson) - 3:59
13. "I'm Not Through with You Yet" (Patrick Pentland) - 3:15

LP2 - The Demos

1. "She Says What She Means-July-Aug 1996 Demo" (Chris Murphy) - 2:19
2. "C'mon C'mon(We're Gonna Get It Started)-Autumn 1997 Demo" (Jay Ferguson) - 3:31
3. "Iggy & Angus-Jan-Feb 1997 Demo" (Patrick Pentland) - 2:09
4. "Sinking Ships-Oct 1997 Demo" (Andrew Scott) - 4:41
5. "Keep on Thinkin'-July 1997 Demo" (Chris Murphy) - 2:28
6. "Money City Maniacs-Aug 1997 Demo (Patrick Pentland/Chris Murphy) - 3:27
7. "Seems so Heavy-Sept 1997 Demo" (Andrew Scott) - 3:43
8. "Chester the Molester-July 1997 Demo" (Chris Murphy) - 2:53
9. "Stand by Me, Yeah-Aug 1997 Demo" (Patrick Pentland) - 3:01
10. "Suppose They Close the Door-July 1997 Demo" (Chris Murphy/Andrew Scott) - 3:43
11. "On the Horizon-Oct 1997 Demo" (Andrew Scott) - 4:37
12. "I Wanna Thank You-Autumn-Winter 1997 Demo" (Jay Ferguson) - 3:39
13. "I'm Not Through with You Yet-Aug 1997 Demo" (Patrick Pentland) - 3:06

LP3 - The Outtakes

1. "So Beyond Me-Studio Outtake" (Chris Murphy) - 2:45
2. "Just One Shot-July-Aug 1996 Demo" (Patrick Pentland) - 2:52
3. "I Feel Lied To-July 1997 Demo" (Chris Murphy) - 2:21
4. "Mother's Day-Studio Outtake" (Andrew Scott) - 3:56
5. "Style is Still Style-Studio Outtake" (Chris Murphy) - 3:21
6. "2, 3 Hello-Aug 1997 Demo" (Patrick Pentland) - 1:21
7. "Open Your Umbrellas-Early 1997 Demo" (Chris Murphy) - 2:10
8. "Daddy Be Cool-Studio Outtake" (Chris Murphy) - 2:49
9. "Family Tree-Oct 1997 Demo" (Andrew Scott) - 4:20
10. "All by Myself-Studio Outtake Version 2" (Chris Murphy) - 3:38
11. "Glen Campbell-July-Aug 1996 Demo" (Jay Ferguson) - 0:59
12. "I've Enabled Myself-Aug 1997 Demo" (Chris Murphy) - 1:48
13. "Helen-Oct 1997 Demo" (Andrew Scott) - 3:29
14. "Yours to Steal-July 1997 Demo" (Chris Murphy) - 1:32

7"1

1. "Rock Star Admit It-July-Aug 1996 Demo" (Chris Murphy) - 3:13
2. "Out to Lunch-Aug 1997 Demo" (Patrick Pentland) - 2:30

Hammond Jam

1. "Hammond Jam Pt 1-Studio Outtake" - 2:20
2. "Hammond Jam Pt 2-Studio Outtake" - 2:08

== Other details ==
- "She Says What She Means" was the last song recorded for the album. Chris Murphy wanted to make a hard rock song because he was jealous of Patrick Pentland's rock songs "Money City Maniacs" and "Iggy & Angus".
- Murphy took the title of his song "Chester the Molester" from a name of a character in a Hustler magazine cartoon strip, that his cousins used to call him. Murphy was reminded of the name by Mark Gaudet, the drummer from the Canadian bands Elevator To Hell and Eric's Trip.
- The lyrics for "I'm Not Through With You Yet" were the original lyrics for "Worried Now" from Sloan's 1994 album, Twice Removed. Pentland originally titled the song with the words "Cotton Picking" because of its supposed "Southern feel", but changed it out of fear that it might be taken as racist.
