= George Stroumboulopoulos Tonight =

Television series

- Also known as: The Hour (2005–2010)
- Genre: Talk show
- Presented by: George Stroumboulopoulos
- Opening theme: "Use It" by The New Pornographers (2005–2008) "The Good in Everyone" by Sloan (2008–2014)
- Country of origin: Canada
- Original language: English
- No. of seasons: 10

Production
- Executive producers: Jennifer Dettman; George Stroumboulopoulos
- Production locations: Toronto, Ontario, Canada
- Running time: 60 min. (2005–2010, 2011–2012); 30 min. (2010–2011, 2012–2014)

Original release
- Network: CBC Newsworld (2005–2009); CBC Television (2006–2014)
- Release: January 17, 2005 – August 29, 2014

George Stroumboulopoulos Tonight (originally known as The Hour) is a Canadian television talk show hosted by George Stroumboulopoulos that aired on CBC Television from 2005 to 2014.

As The Hour, the show was so named, as it was a daily one-hour program. For the show's seventh season, the show was renamed and shortened into a daily half-hour show, George Stroumboulopoulos Tonight, beginning September 20, 2010. In September 2011, the program was again extended to one hour with its current name. It returned to a half-hour for the 2012–13 season and moved to 7:00 p.m. (replacing Wheel of Fortune), along with a late-night encore that moved to 11:30 p.m. due to the expansion of late local news at several of the CBC's major market stations. The show concluded at the end of the 2013–2014 season as Stroumboulopoulos moved to Rogers Communications to host Hockey Night in Canada.

The show had two opening theme songs during its history. Its first was "Use It" by The New Pornographers, which was replaced by "The Good in Everyone" by Canadian rock band Sloan at the start of the 2008 broadcast season.

== Format ==
=== The Hour ===
The Hour generally opened with Stroumboloupoulos standing just outside the studio, where he addressed the camera, giving the audience hints about each of the upcoming guests. Then, he sometimes made a mention of Sloan (the band who performs the theme song) and proceeded to "Start the Show." While the title flash was shown, George would walk into the studio, past some audience members, and sit down in his red armchair. He then would introduce himself to the audience and the viewers by saying, "Welcome to the show, I'm your boyfriend, George Stroumboloupoulos". He then provided an introduction to each of the guests, briefly describing what they will talk about.

Before each guest entered, Stroumboulopoulos would say a few words about them, then the show would cut to "The Bio." The Bio, a short description, consisted of a series of pictures and video clips, with a voiceover directed at George. During this time, the guest would enter the studio, and take their place in the second red armchair.

Show segments (written by Stroumboulopoulos along with various comedy writers) on The Hour included:

- "Mile a Minute" touching on current events around the world, with video or images accompanied by Stroumboulopoulos' commentary.
- "The News" a satiric look at the world of entertainment.
- "The List", a primarily satirical Top 5 list concerning a current news event.
- "Best Story Ever", a segment where a celebrity briefly relates one of their best personal "stories" to the camera. The stories are usually rewritten and feature guest comedians.
- On some programs, Stroumboulopoulos read aloud viewer correspondence, in a segment called "George Reads the Mail."

In earlier seasons, segments on The Hour had included:

- "Canada," a segment similar to Mile a Minute, but limited to current events in Canada. This segment aired only during Seasons One and Two.
- "Time Capsule," showing CBC footage from past events related to current events, sometimes with video and audio. At other times George comments on the video footage.
- "The Newsstand," a one-on-one interview between Stroumboulopoulos and a guest, taking place at a newsstand, discussing issues related to various magazine articles.

The final segment of the show was called "The Closer," and consisted of a monologue by Stroumboulopoulos about a particular current event. Since January 2007, this segment has been replaced by "The List." On some programs, the show ends immediately after the final guest, without "The Closer" or "The List."

=== George Stroumboulopoulos Tonight ===
Full guest interviews were posted on YouTube and CBC's website the following day.

== Guests ==
Some of the guests have included:

- Adam Copeland
- Sridevi
- The Tragically Hip
- M.I.A.
- Eckhart Tolle
- Margaret Atwood
- Hillary Clinton
- Sarah Palin
- Wyclef Jean
- Chris Jericho
- Tom Cruise
- Bill Maher
- James Cameron
- Robert F. Kennedy Jr.
- Marlee Matlin
- Tim Robbins
- Jim Parsons
- Michael Fassbender
- Jason Segel
- Spike Lee
- Ricky Gervais
- Tony Bennett
- Greg Kinnear
- John Legend
- David Byrne
- Former president of the United States Jimmy Carter
- Larry King
- LeBron James
- Henry Rollins
- Evangeline Lilly
- Former White House Press Secretary Scott McClellan
- Alanis Morissette
- Malcolm Gladwell
- Richard Branson
- Howard Zinn
- Kings of Leon
- Kylie Minogue
- Daniel and Henrik Sedin
- Sean Avery
- Former Canadian prime ministers Paul Martin, John Turner and Brian Mulroney
- P!nk
- The Smashing Pumpkins
- David Suzuki
- Nickelback
- Mike Holmes
- Douglas Coupland
- Naomi Klein
- Richard Dawkins
- Christopher Hitchens
- Daniel Tammet
- David Thewlis
- Larry Charles
- Dana White
- Tony Robbins
- Gordon Ramsay
- Dave Salmoni
- Steve Wozniak
- Kermit the Frog
- Adrien Brody

Stroumboulopoulos conducted the last public interview granted by journalist and social activist June Callwood before her death.

In 2007, The Hour ran a Christmas special featuring musical performances on set. On June 6, 2008, the show featured an hour-long special with British band Coldplay. On December 9, 2008, an hour-long special with actor Tom Cruise aired and on December 31, 2008 ran a New Year's Eve special featuring an interview with former vice-presidential candidate Sarah Palin.

== Timeslot history ==
Name	Season	Period	First broadcast	Repeat
The Hour	1; 2	2005; 2006	Monday to Thursday; 8 p.m. ET on CBC Newsworld	Monday to Thursday; 11 p.m. ET on CBC Newsworld
The Hour	3; 4; 5	Oct 2006 – Sept 2007; Oct 2007 – Sept 2008; Oct 2008 – Sept 2009	Monday to Friday; 8 p.m. ET on CBC Newsworld	Monday to Friday; 11 p.m. local time (11:30 p.m. NL) on CBC Television
The Hour	6	Oct 2009 – 2010	Monday to Friday; 11:05 p.m. local time (11:30 p.m. NL) on CBC Television	Tuesday to Saturday; 5 a.m. local time (5:30 a.m. NL) on CBC Television
George; Stroumboulopoulos; Tonight	7; 8	Sept 2010 – 2011; Sept 2011 – 2012	Monday to Friday; 11:05 p.m. local time (11:30 p.m. NL) on CBC Television	Tuesday to Saturday; 5 a.m. local time (5:30 a.m. NL) on CBC Television
George; Stroumboulopoulos; Tonight	9; 10	Sept 2012 – 2013; Sept 2013 – Aug 2014	Monday to Friday; 7 p.m. local time on CBC Television	Monday to Friday; 11:30 p.m. local time on CBC Television

- In addition, CBET in Windsor, Ontario had an additional showing of The Hour at 5 p.m. ET during the sixth season, in lieu of a local newscast at that hour.
- The Friday shows are usually the best guest interviews repackaged into one show.

== Taping locations ==
The program typically taped at the Canadian Broadcasting Centre in Toronto, Monday to Friday in front of a live studio audience, then is broadcast at 7:00 p.m. (ET).

The show went on location to Vancouver, Calgary, Montreal, and St. John's, and has twice broadcast from London.

One remote broadcast came out of an interview with enterprising trader Kyle MacDonald who said the only limitation to his activities would be that he would not make any trade with the citizenry of a small village called Yahk, British Columbia. When the citizens protested the exclusion by writing letters to the show, the trader accused Stroumboulopoulos of hypnotizing him into making that statement and he would only go to that town if the show went there first. On 9 February 2006, the producers broadcast an episode from that village.

== Awards ==
The Hour/George Stroumboulopoulos Tonight have won seven Gemini Awards:

- 2006 – Viewer's Choice Award, Best Host
- 2007 – Best Talk Series, Best Host, Best Production/Design (Callum MacLachlan)
- 2008 – Best Host
- 2011 – Best Talk Series
