= Pretty Together =

Studio album by Sloan
- Released: October 16, 2001 (Canada); April 23, 2002 (U.S.)
- Recorded: 2000–2001
- Genre: Rock, alternative rock
- Length: 47:08
- Label: Murderecords, BMG Music Canada, RCA Records
- Producer: Brenndan McGuire, Sloan

Sloan chronology
| Between the Bridges (1999) | Pretty Together (2001) | Action Pact (2003) |

Singles from Pretty Together
- 1. "If It Feels Good Do It" Released: 2001; 2. "The Other Man" Released: 2002

Professional ratings
Review scores
| Source | Rating |
|---|---|
| AllMusic | 4/5 stars |
| Pitchfork | 6.6/10 |

Pretty Together is the sixth studio album by the Canadian rock group Sloan. While the album still has the 1960s and 1970s influences of Sloan's previous albums, it is more melancholy with fewer of the upbeat songs found on previous albums. "If It Feels Good Do It" and "The Other Man" were the two singles released from the album, with the latter being a melancholy plea by Chris Murphy which marked a departure from the usual upbeat songs Murphy provides the group with. The album reached #12 on the Canadian Albums Chart, and both singles received notable radio airplay in Canada. The album was nominated for Best Rock Album at the 2002 Juno Awards.

== Track listing ==
| No. | Title | Writer(s) | Length |
|---|---|---|---|
| 1. | "If It Feels Good Do It" | Patrick Pentland/Sloan | 3:57 |
| 2. | "In the Movies" | Andrew Scott/ Sloan | 3:34 |
| 3. | "The Other Man" | Chris Murphy/Sloan | 3:54 |
| 4. | "Dreaming of You" | Jay Ferguson/ Sloan | 3:44 |
| 5. | "Pick It Up and Dial It" | Chris Murphy/Sloan | 3:36 |
| 6. | "The Great Wall" | Andrew Scott/Sloan | 3:11 |
| 7. | "The Life of a Working Girl" | Chris Murphy/Sloan | 3:47 |
| 8. | "Never Seeing the Ground for the Sky" | Andrew Scott/Sloan | 4:48 |
| 9. | "It's in Your Eyes" | Patrick Pentland/Sloan | 4:41 |
| 10. | "Who You Talkin' To?" | Jay Ferguson/Sloan | 3:15 |
| 11. | "I Love a Long Goodbye" | Chris Murphy/Sloan | 3:09 |
| 12. | "Are You Giving Me Back My Love?" | Jay Ferguson/Sloan | 3:20 |
| 13. | "Your Dreams Have Come True" | Patrick Pentland/Sloan | 3:22 |

Japanese bonus tracks

| No. | Title | Writer(s) | Length |
|---|---|---|---|
| 14. | "Had Enough" | Chris Murphy/Sloan | 3:21 |
| 15. | "Helen" | Andrew Scott/Sloan | 4:04 |

B-sides

- "Pretty Together (demo)" (Comes With a Smile vol 3 compilation)

== Year-end charts ==
| Chart (2002) | Position |
|---|---|
| Canadian Alternative Albums (Nielsen SoundScan) | 139 |
