= B Sides Win: Extras, Bonus Tracks and B-Sides 1992–2008 =

Compilation album by Sloan
- Released: February 2010
- Recorded: 1992–2008
- Genre: Rock, power pop, indie rock
- Label: Murderecords
- Producer: Sloan

Sloan chronology
Hit & Run (EP) (2009)	B Sides Win: Extras, Bonus Tracks and B-Sides 1992–2008 (2010)	The Double Cross (2010)

B Sides Win: Extras, Bonus Tracks and B-Sides 1992–2008 is a compilation album by Sloan, comprising B-sides, bonus tracks and compilation tracks recorded between 1992 and 2008. The album was released in February 2010 on Sloan's Murderecords label, in a digital download format.

== Track listing ==
All tracks are written by Sloan, except "Dirty Nails," written by Amy Bowles and Temple Bates

No.	Title	Length
1.	"Underwhelmed (Original Hear & Now Version)"	4:38
2.	"Amped"	3:03
3.	"Sleepover"	8:05
4.	"Rag Doll"	3:11
5.	"Laying Blame"	3:42
6.	"Pillow Fight"	3:49
7.	"D Is for Driver"	2:24
8.	"Stood Up (Studio Version)"	3:50
9.	"Same Old Flame (Studio Version)"	3:53
10.	"Work Cut Out"	2:42
11.	"Out to Lunch"	3:37
12.	"Glad to Be Here"	2:51
13.	"Summer's My Season"	3:44
14.	"At the Edge of the Scene"	4:41
15.	"Had Enough"	3:21
16.	"Helen"	4:04
17.	"Pretty Together (Demo)"	2:57
18.	"Are You Giving Me Back My Love? (Russian Futurists Version)"	3:49
19.	"Step on It, Jean"	2:13
20.	"Dirty Nails"	1:23
21.	"Will You Ever Love Me Again?"	4:34
22.	"I Thought That I Was Ready for You"	2:43
23.	"Tell Me Something I Don't Know"	2:45
24.	"Even Though"	3:53
25.	"The Best Part of Your Life"	4:16
26.	"Believe in Me (Reprise)"	3:56
