= One Chord to Another =

Studio album by Sloan
- Released: June 12, 1996 (Canada); February 12, 1997 (US); May 8, 1997 (JPN); May 31, 2016 (Deluxe Reissue)
- Recorded: December 1995 – January 1996
- Studio: Idea of East, (Halifax, Nova Scotia, Canada)
- Genre: Alternative rock, indie rock, power pop
- Length: 38:26
- Label: Murderecords, The Enclave
- Producer: Laurence Currie; Sloan

Sloan chronology
Twice Removed (1994)	One Chord to Another (1996)	Recorded Live at a Sloan Party (1997)

Singles from One Chord to Another
- 1. "The Good in Everyone" Released: 1996; 2. "Everything You've Done Wrong" Released: 1996; 3. "The Lines You Amend" Released: 1996

One Chord to Another is the third studio album by the Canadian rock band Sloan. The album was released in Canada through Murderecords in 1996 and in the United States through The Enclave in 1997. Like their previous album, One Chord to Another is a Beatles-influenced power pop record.

One Chord to Another was the band's first LP not to be released through Geffen Records. It was also the band's first album to win a Juno Award.

== Recording ==
Sloan began recording One Chord to Another in December 1995. The album was recorded over two weeks and cost $10,000 to make, $110,000 less than the cost of their previous album. It was the band's first album to feature trumpets.

== Reception ==
=== Commercial performance ===
The album debuted at No. 15 on The Record's Canadian Albums Chart. It was certified gold in Canada on November 21, 1996. By February 1997, the album had sold 80,000 units in Canada. It remains Sloan's best-selling album.

=== Critical acclaim ===
Professional ratings
Review scores
Source	Rating
AllMusic	4.5/5 stars
Entertainment Weekly	B+
Rolling Stone	3.5/5 stars
Uncut	4/5 stars

The album won the award for Best Alternative Album at the 1997 Juno Awards. In a 2000 poll by music magazine Chart, One Chord to Another was voted the ninth-greatest Canadian album of all time. It was also ranked 34th in Bob Mersereau's 2007 book The Top 100 Canadian Albums.

== Track listing ==
All songs credited to Sloan.

No.	Title	Writer(s)	Length
1.	"The Good in Everyone"	Patrick Pentland	2:17
2.	"Nothing Left to Make Me Want to Stay"	Chris Murphy	2:35
3.	"Autobiography"	Chris Murphy	3:18
4.	"Junior Panthers"	Jay Ferguson	2:38
5.	"G Turns to D"	Chris Murphy	3:24
6.	"A Side Wins"	Andrew Scott	3:11
7.	"Everything You've Done Wrong"	Patrick Pentland	3:29
8.	"Anyone Who's Anyone"	Chris Murphy	2:48
9.	"The Lines You Amend"	Jay Ferguson	2:32
10.	"Take the Bench"	Chris Murphy	3:50
11.	"Can't Face Up"	Patrick Pentland	3:53
12.	"400 Metres"	Andrew Scott	4:31

Japanese Bonus Tracks

- "Stood Up" (Chris Murphy/Sloan) – 3:50
- "Same Old Flame" (Patrick Pentland/Sloan) – 3:53

B-sides

- "Stood Up" (7" single)
- "Same Old Flame" (7" single)
- "Autobiography" (Demo) ("The Good in Everyone" 7")

Prior to the release of One Chord to Another, Sloan released "Same Old Flame" b/w "Stood Up" as a 7" single on murderecords. These songs were re-recorded for the first pressing of One Chord to Another in Japan, released on EMI. While these versions of "Stood Up" are a Chris Murphy original, the song by the same name on Recorded Live at a Sloan Party is a cover of a Matthew Grimson song.

=== 20th anniversary edition box set ===
LP 1 – Original album

1. "The Good in Everyone" (Patrick Pentland/Sloan) – 2:17
2. "Nothing Left to Make Me Want to Stay" (Chris Murphy/Sloan) – 2:35
3. "Autobiography" (Chris Murphy/Sloan) – 3:18
4. "Junior Panthers" (Jay Ferguson/Sloan) – 2:38
5. G Turns to D" (Chris Murphy/Sloan) – 3:24
6. A Side Wins" (Andrew Scott/Sloan) – 3:11
7. "Everything You've Done Wrong" (Patrick Pentland/Sloan) – 3:29
8. "Anyone Who's Anyone" (Chris Murphy/Sloan) – 2:48
9. "The Lines You Amend" (Jay Ferguson/Sloan) – 2:32
10. "Take the Bench" (Chris Murphy/Sloan) – 3:50
11. "Can't Face Up" (Patrick Pentland/Sloan) – 3:53
12. "400 Metres" (Andrew Scott/Sloan) – 4:31

LP 2 – The Outtakes

1. "El Say" (Andrew Scott/Sloan) – 1:51
2. "Pictures Now" (Chris Murphy/Sloan) – 3:00
3. "Adele" (Patrick Pentland/Sloan) – 3:12
4. "Baxter" (Andrew Scott/Sloan) – 3:39
5. "I'm Gonna Give It a Try" (Chris Murphy/Sloan) – 2:43
6. "Song #1" (Andrew Scott/Sloan) – 1:53
7. "Learn How to Play Dead" (Jay Ferguson/Sloan) – 3:37
8. "Imagine All the Songs" (Chris Murphy/Sloan) – 3:03
9. "Flexible Flyer" (Andrew Scott/Sloan) – 2:28
10. "In My Mind" (Patrick Pentland/Sloan) – 2:28
11. "Teachers in the Bleachers" (Andrew Scott/Sloan) – 3:44

LP 3 – Recorded "Live" at a Sloan Party!

1. "Let's Get the Party Started" (Sloan) – 2:28
2. "I Can Feel It" (Patrick Pentland/Sloan) – 3:54
3. "Dignified and Old" (Jonathan Richman) – 3:12
4. "Glitter and Gold" (Barry Mann/Cynthia Weil) – 3:02
5. "Over You" (Bryan Ferry/Phil Manzanera) – 3:20
6. "I Am the Cancer" (Chris Murphy/Sloan) – 3:22
7. "I Can't Let Go" (Al Gorgoni/Chip Taylor) – 2:35
8. "Stood Up" – 3:28 (Matthew Grimson)
9. "On the Road Again/Transona Five" (Tim Gane/Floyd Jones/Lætitia Sadier/Alan Wilson) – 4:42
10. "I Wouldn't Want to Lose Your Love" (Myles Goodwyn) – 5:45

7"

1. "Mirror Ball" (Junior Panthers demo) (Jay Ferguson/Sloan)
2. "John, You Made It On" (G Turns to D demo) (Chris Murphy/Sloan)

One Chord to Another Demos (Digital download and limited cassette)

1. "The Good in Everyone" (demo) (Patrick Pentland/Sloan)
2. "Billy Joel" (Nothing Left to Make Me Want to Stay demo) (Chris Murphy/Sloan)
3. "Autobiography" (demo) (Chris Murphy/Sloan)
4. "Mirror Ball" (Junior Panthers demo) (Jay Ferguson/Sloan)
5. "John, You Made It On" (G Turns to D demo) (Chris Murphy/Sloan)
6. "A Side Wins" (demo) (Andrew Scott/Sloan)
7. "Everything You've Done Wrong" (demo) (Patrick Pentland/Sloan)
8. "Everyone Who's Anyone" (Anyone Who's Anyone demo) (Chris Murphy/Sloan)
9. "Found a Way" (The Lines You Amend demo) (Jay Ferguson/Sloan)
10. "Sing Your Little Heart Out" (Take the Bench demo from Pier 21) (Chris Murphy/Sloan)
11. "Can't Face Up" (demo from Idea of East Recording) (Patrick Pentland/Sloan)
12. "400 Metres" (demo) (Andrew Scott/Sloan)

== American and Japanese releases ==
One Chord to Another was not released until 1997 in the United States on the independent label The Enclave. It was originally released in an LP-style cardboard gatefold jacket rather than a traditional plastic jewel box, and included a 10-track bonus CD of material entitled Recorded Live at a Sloan Party! This bonus CD consisted of cover versions and re-recordings of previous Sloan songs; it was recorded in the studio but was overdubbed with miscellaneous party-type sounds to give the impression of being recorded live at an intimate gathering of friends (somewhat akin to the Beach Boys' Party! album). To date, the "Sloan Party" CD has not been released in the band's native Canada and has only been available as an American import. In 2016, the "Sloan Party" album was released on vinyl as part of the 20th anniversary One Chord to Another box set, featuring new album art reminiscent of the Beach Boys' Party! album.

1. "Let's Get the Party Started" (Sloan) – 2:28
2. "I Can Feel It" (Patrick Pentland/Sloan) – 3:54 (new version; original version on Twice Removed)
3. "Dignified and Old" (Jonathan Richman) – 3:12 (originally performed by The Modern Lovers)
4. "Glitter and Gold" (Barry Mann/Cynthia Weil) – 3:02 (originally performed by The Turtles, and later, The Everly Brothers)
5. "Over You" (Bryan Ferry/Phil Manzanera) – 3:20 (originally performed by Roxy Music)
6. "I Am the Cancer" (Chris Murphy/Sloan) – 3:22 (new version; original version on Smeared)
7. "I Can't Let Go" (Al Gorgoni/Chip Taylor) – 2:35 (originally performed by Evie Sands, and later, The Hollies)
8. "Stood Up" (Matthew Grimson) – 3:28 (originally performed by Matthew Grimson)
9. "On the Road Again/Transona Five" (Tim Gane/Floyd Jones/Lætitia Sadier/Alan Wilson) – 4:42 (originally performed by Canned Heat and Stereolab, respectively)
10. "I Wouldn't Want to Lose Your Love" (Myles Goodwyn) – 5:45 (originally performed by April Wine)

All of track 1 and the last 2:35 of track 10 consist of party sound effects only; track 8 is a cover of a song by Matthew Grimson, not the similarly titled Sloan song released as a 1996 7" single. Track 2 is performed by Patrick Pentland and Jennifer Pierce; track 3 is performed by Chris Murphy; track 4 is performed by Andrew Scott; track 5 is performed by Jay Ferguson; track 6 is performed by Chris Murphy; track 7 is performed by Jay Ferguson; track 8 is performed by Chris Murphy; track 9 is performed by Jay Ferguson; track 10 is performed by Patrick Pentland.

One Chord to Another was Sloan's first album to be released in Japan. They secured a distribution deal with EMI, who released the album with new recordings of "Stood Up" and "Same Old Flame". When Navy Blues was released in Canada, however, Sloan's distribution deal with Universal Canada led to new Japanese distribution with Universal Japan. Universal then released Sloan's first three albums in Japan. The new Universal Japan version of One Chord to Another was a one-disc release featuring Recorded Live at a Sloan Party! as bonus tracks, making the original Japanese release on EMI, with its two exclusive tracks, a rarity in the Sloan catalogue.
