= Unkind (song) =

Single by Sloan

from the album The Double Cross
- Released: March 29, 2011
- Genre: Rock
- Length: 4:15; 3:51 (Radio edit)
- Label: Outside
- Songwriter(s): Patrick Pentland, Sloan
- Producer(s): Ryan Haslett, Sloan

Sloan singles chronology
"Take It Upon Yourself" (2009)	"Unkind" (2011)	"The Answer Was You" (2011)

Music video
- "Unkind" on YouTube

"Unkind" is a song by Canadian rock group Sloan. The song was released as the first single from the band's tenth studio album, The Double Cross.

The original edit of the song features a "guitar echo" intro/outro. The radio edit doesn't feature the "guitar echo" intro/outro.

== Music video ==
The music video for "Unkind" was filmed by Kevin Hilliard & Tim McCready and premiered on Vevo on July 5, 2011. The song was received favorably by Rolling Stone, who described the video as "elegant and classy".

== Charts ==
Chart (2011)	Peak position
Canada Rock (Billboard)	9
Canadian Alternative Rock Chart	16
