= Everything You've Done Wrong =

Single by Sloan

from the album One Chord to Another
- Released: 1996
- Genre: Pop rock
- Length: 3:29
- Label: Murderecords, The Enclave
- Songwriter(s): Patrick Pentland, Sloan

Sloan singles chronology
"The Good in Everyone" (1996)	"Everything You've Done Wrong" (1996)	"The Lines You Amend" (1996)

Alternative Cover
- Cover of US Version

Music video
- "Everything You've Done Wrong" on YouTube

"Everything You've Done Wrong" is a song by Canadian rock band Sloan. The song was released as the second single from the band's 1996 album, One Chord to Another. It is the band's highest charted single ever in Canada, reaching #6 on Canada's RPM Singles Chart. The song was nominated for "Single of the Year" at the 1998 East Coast Music Awards.

== Music video ==
The music video for "Everything You've Done Wrong" was directed by Chris Soos and filmed at the Royal York Hotel in Toronto. The video features the band performing at a wedding. The video begins with Andrew Scott playing "Junior Panthers" (a song from One Chord to Another) on piano behind the curtain. He then joins the rest of the band on the stage and the band proceeds to play. As they are playing, the band witnesses all the things going wrong at the wedding. Near the end of the song, several Sloan fans enter the room to watch the band.

The video was nominated for "Video of the Year" at the 1998 East Coast Music Awards.

== Charts ==
=== Weekly charts ===
Chart (1996)	Peak position
Canada Top Singles (RPM)	6

=== Year-end charts ===
Chart (1996)	Position
Canada Top Singles (RPM)	67

== In popular culture ==
- The song is featured in the Sofia Coppola film The Virgin Suicides, and is also featured on the film's soundtrack.
- The song is featured in the Canadian film Everything's Gone Green, and is also featured on the film's soundtrack.
- The song is the theme song for the comedy series Living in Your Car.
- The song is featured in the 2001 skateboarding video "Man Down" by Tilt Mode Army.
