= People of the Sky =

Single by Sloan

from the album Twice Removed
- Released: 1994
- Genre: Alternative rock, indie rock
- Length: 3:37
- Label: Geffen Records, murderecords
- Songwriters: Andrew Scott, Sloan

Sloan singles chronology
"Penpals" (1994)	"People of the Sky" (1994)	"I Hate My Generation" (1994)

"People of the Sky" is a song by the Canadian rock band Sloan. It was released in 1994 as the second single from the band's second studio album, Twice Removed. The song is featured on the band's compilation album A Sides Win: Singles 1992-2005.

== Music videos ==
Two videos were made for "People of the Sky". The alternate video was filmed on the same set where the band filmed their video for "Coax Me".

== Charts ==
=== Weekly charts ===
Chart (1994)	Peak position
Canada Top Singles (RPM)	58
