= The Rest of My Life (Sloan song) =

Single by Sloan

from the album Action Pact
- Released: 2003
- Genre: Alternative rock, power pop
- Length: 2:46
- Label: RCA
- Songwriters: Chris Murphy, Sloan
- Producer: Tom Rothrock

Sloan singles chronology
"The Other Man" (2001)	"The Rest of My Life" (2003)	"Live On" (2003)

Music video
- "The Rest of My Life" on YouTube

"The Rest of My Life" is a song by Canadian rock band Sloan. The song was released as the lead single from the band's seventh studio album, Action Pact. The song received notable radio airplay, being the #1 most added single at radio by the Canadian Music Network. The song was nominated for "Favourite New Single" at the 2003 CASBY Awards.
