= The Lines You Amend =

Single by Sloan

from the album One Chord to Another
- Released: 1996
- Genre: Alternative rock
- Length: 2:32
- Label: Murderecords, MCA
- Songwriter(s): Jay Ferguson, Sloan
- Producer(s): Laurence Currie, Sloan

Sloan singles chronology
"Everything You've Done Wrong" (1996)	"The Lines You Amend" (1996)	"G Turns to D" (1997)

Music video
- "The Lines You Amend" on YouTube

"The Lines You Amend" is a song by Canadian rock band Sloan. It was released as the third single from the band's 1996 album, One Chord to Another. The song was written by Jay Ferguson. It is the band's first song written by Ferguson to be released as a single.

== Reception ==
Bassist-vocalist Chris Murphy described the song as being "about suicide", and said, "We sort of breeze through it like it's a cutesy number, but the lyrics are heavy." One lyric makes reference to Ringo Starr's song "Photograph".

The song has been praised by critics for its melodic strength, with one critic describing it as "Beatle-esque pop". Billboard magazine's critic suggested it was in the style of Violent Femmes. Rolling Stone's critic wrote that the song begins sounding like "The Ballad of John and Yoko", but then becomes "a likable hybrid of T. Rex and Crowded House."

Portions of the music video were filmed in a York University lecture hall.

== Charts ==
Chart (1997)	Peak position
Canada Top Singles (RPM)	39
Canada Alternative 30 (RPM)	12
