= Twice Removed =

Studio album by Sloan
- Released: August 10, 1994; August 30, 1994 (International); March 1, 2012 (Deluxe Reissue)
- Recorded: January – March 1994, in Hoboken, New Jersey, and New York City
- Genre: Power pop
- Length: 44:48
- Labels: Geffen Records, murderecords
- Producers: Jim Rondinelli, Sloan

Sloan chronology
Smeared (1992)	Twice Removed (1994)	One Chord to Another (1996)

Singles from Twice Removed
- 1. "Coax Me" Released: 1994; 2. "Penpals" Released: 1994; 3. "People of the Sky" Released: 1994; 4. "I Hate My Generation" Released: 1994

Professional ratings
Review scores
Source	Rating
AllMusic	4.5/5 stars
The Village Voice	B+

Twice Removed is the second album by Canadian rock band Sloan, released on Geffen Records in 1994. The album took seven weeks and cost $120,000 to record. More melodic than their previous album, Smeared, Geffen gave the record little promotion because it defied the label's commercially dominant grunge rock style of the time. The band and Geffen parted ways after Twice Removed's release. After the band's trouble with the label, they took time off from touring and writing; they had also broken up for a brief period.

== Commercial performance ==
Twice Removed peaked at No. 25 on the RPM Canadian Albums Chart. By February 1997, the album had sold 58,000 units in Canada. The album was certified Gold in Canada on October 20, 1998. In the United States, the album has sold 14,000 units to date according to Nielsen Soundscan.

== Legacy ==
In 1996, the music magazine Chart conducted a reader poll to determine the best Canadian albums of all time. Twice Removed topped that poll. When the magazine conducted a follow-up poll in 2000, Twice Removed lost the top spot to Joni Mitchell's Blue; however, it still placed third. In the third poll, in 2005, Twice Removed reclaimed the top spot.

It was also ranked fourteenth in Bob Mersereau's 2007 book The Top 100 Canadian Albums.

In 2012, the album received a deluxe reissue on vinyl. This edition includes another three discs: one containing demo versions of the Twice Removed songs; another containing B-sides that were originally intended for the album but left off; and a 7-inch, 45 RPM disc containing songs that, in the words of guitarist Jay Ferguson, "didn't really fit anywhere else in the package". The release also includes a 12x12, 32-page colour booklet containing photos, interviews and other stories from the band's members. The reissue was made available exclusively via the band's website.

In 2015, the album was named the winner in the 1990s category of the inaugural Slaight Family Polaris Heritage Prize, an annual Canadian music award for classic albums released prior to the creation of the Polaris Music Prize.

== Track listing ==
All songs credited to Sloan.

No.	Title	Writer(s)	Length
1.	"Penpals"	Chris Murphy	3:08
2.	"I Hate My Generation"	Jay Ferguson/Chris Murphy	2:26
3.	"People of the Sky"	Andrew Scott	3:37
4.	"Coax Me"	Chris Murphy	3:26
5.	"Bells On"	Chris Murphy	3:55
6.	"Loosens"	Patrick Pentland	5:26
7.	"Worried Now"	Patrick Pentland	2:40
8.	"Shame Shame"	Chris Murphy	3:04
9.	"Deeper Than Beauty"	Chris Murphy	2:40
10.	"Snowsuit Sound"	Jay Ferguson	3:47
11.	"Before I Do"	Murphy, Scott	7:04
12.	"I Can Feel It"	Patrick Pentland	3:28

Japanese Bonus Tracks

No.	Title	Writer(s)	Length
13.	"D Is for Driver"	Chris Murphy	2:24

The Demos (2012 Deluxe Reissue Box Set)

No.	Title	Length
14.	"Penpals" (31 Clayton Park Dr demo)	3:01
15.	"I Hate My Generation" (Pier 21 demo)	2:19
16.	"People Of The Sky" (Pier 21 demo)	3:32
17.	"Coax Me" (31 Clayton Park Dr demo)	3:25
18.	"Bells On" (Pier 21 demo)	3:59
19.	"Loosens" (31 Clayton Park Dr demo)	4:57
20.	"Worried Now" (Pier 21 demo)	2:38
21.	"Shame Shame" (31 Clayton Park Dr demo)	3:50
22.	"Deeper Than Beauty" (Pier 21 demo)	2:26
23.	"Snowsuit Sound" (Sound Market Studios demo)	2:40
24.	"Before I Do" (Pier 21 demo)	5:22
25.	"I Can Feel It" (Pier 21)	3:53

The Outtakes (2012 Deluxe Reissue Box Set)

No.	Title	Length
26.	"Guidance Counselor" (31 Clayton Park Dr demo)	2:20
27.	"Ill Placed Trust" (31 Clayton Park Dr demo)	2:58
28.	"Autobiography" (Laura’s Apartment demo)	3:16
29.	"Consider It Lumped" (Deep Space Nine demo)	4:31
30.	"Sing Your Little Heart Out" (31 Clayton Park Dr demo)	2:44
31.	"Stood Up" (Deep Space Nine demo)	2:48
32.	"Same Old Flame" (31 Clayton Park Dr demo)	3:14
33.	"Every Needle Has An Eye" (Deep Space Nine demo)	3:25
34.	"Girl In Case" (Pier 21 demo)	2:32
35.	"One Professional Care" (Sound Market Studios demo)	2:34
36.	"Kinetic And Content" (31 Clayton Park Dr demo)	3:15
37.	"Sing Your Little Heart Out" (Pier 21 demo (Bandcamp Exclusive)	2:38
38.	"D Is For Driver" (Pier 21 demo (Bandcamp Exclusive)	2:50
39.	"Every Needle Has An Eye" (31 Clayton Park Dr demo (Bandcamp Exclusive)	3:48

7" Single (2012 Deluxe Reissue Box Set)

No.	Title	Length
40.	"I Hate My Generation (Chris Demo)" (Deep Space Nine demo)	3:08
41.	"I Can Feel It (Alternate Chords Demo)" (Deep Space Nine demo)	1:58

B-Sides

- "Coax Me (Icks Nay on the Evie Stay Micks)" (Coax Me 7")
- "One Professional Care" (Coax Me 7")
- "I Can Feel It (demo)" (Promotional 7")

== Trivia ==
- Jennifer Pierce from Jale appears once again as a backup singer on "I Can Feel It".
- Lyrics for the first track on the album, "Penpals", were taken from broken English fan letters to Kurt Cobain, which the band rummaged through when they were signed to Geffen in the early 1990s.
- "Penpals" is referenced in the graphic novel Lost at Sea by Bryan Lee O'Malley when one character sings the lyrics from it.
