= Smeared =

Studio album by Sloan
- Released: October 1, 1992 (CAN); January 13, 1993 (US); February 24, 1993 (JPN); May 25, 2024 (Deluxe Reissue)
- Recorded: 1992
- Studios: SoundMarket Studio, Halifax, Nova Scotia
- Genres: Alternative rock, indie rock
- Length: 46:19
- Labels: Geffen, murderecords
- Producers: Terry Pulliam, Sloan

Sloan chronology
Peppermint EP (1992)	Smeared (1992)	Twice Removed (1994)

Professional ratings
Review scores
Source	Rating
AllMusic	3/5 stars
Entertainment Weekly	B+
NME	7/10
Rolling Stone	4/5 stars
The Village Voice	B+

Smeared is the debut studio album by Canadian rock band Sloan. It was released in Canada on October 1, 1992, and in the United States in January, 1993, on Geffen Records. The album was recorded at a cost of $1,200. The album is ranked 86th in the 2007 book The Top 100 Canadian Albums by music journalist Bob Mersereau and is widely considered a seminal album of Canada's 1990s alternative rock scene. In an interview with GuitarWorld, in December 2022, Patrick Pentland stated that a Smeared 30th Anniversary reissue is in the works, slated for 2023. The deluxe edition reissue was eventually released in May 2024, which featured a 44-page book, concert poster, unreleased demos & outtakes from the Smeared sessions, as well as a previously unreleased live concert from June 1993 at McGill University, in Montreal.

== Overview ==
Like their first release, the Peppermint EP, Smeared received comparisons to Sonic Youth and Beatles. Three songs from Peppermint re-appear on Smeared; one of these ("Underwhelmed") was entirely re-recorded, while the other two ("Marcus Said" and "Sugartune") are the same recordings with new mixing. The band had originally intended to name the album Gluegun.

The track Median Strip, despite being principally written by Andrew Scott, was sung by Chris Murphy. An alternate version featuring Scott's vocals was included on the 2024 deluxe reissue.

Music videos were produced for the tracks "Underwhelmed", "500 Up", and "Sugar Tune". The music video for "Sugar Tune" was shot in the Spring of 1993, in Iowa, while the band were on their United States tour of Smeared, and was shot by Super Friendz' Matt Murphy. This video went unreleased until December 2024. Two videos were shot for "Underwhelmed". The first version of the video, shot by Colin MacKenzie, was shot in Clayton Park, in Halifax, NS, in June 1992, at Chris' parents house. This version of the video, was the winner of the Moonsnail Award, in the Music Video category, at the Atlantic Film Festival, in 1992. Both "Underwhelmed" and "500 Up" received moderate rotation on MuchMusic in the early 1990s. Jennifer Pierce, of fellow Halifax band Jale, sang backing vocals on "I Am the Cancer".

== Commercial performance ==
By September 1993, the album had sold more than 150,000 copies worldwide. The album was certified Gold in Canada on July 12, 1995. By February 1997, the album had sold 60,000 units in Canada.

== Track listing ==
All songs credited to Sloan.

No.	Title	Writer(s)	Length
1.	"Underwhelmed"	Chris Murphy	4:41
2.	"Raspberry"	Murphy	4:02
3.	"I Am the Cancer"	Murphy	3:39
4.	"Median Strip"	Andrew Scott/Murphy	3:34
5.	"Take It In"	Murphy	3:56
6.	"500 Up"	Scott/Patrick Pentland	4:21
7.	"Marcus Said"	Murphy	4:32
8.	"Sugartune"	Pentland	3:27
9.	"Left of Centre"	Murphy/Scott	2:34
10.	"Lemonzinger"	Jay Ferguson	4:10
11.	"Two Seater"	Murphy	3:04
12.	"What's There to Decide?"	Ferguson	4:19

Japanese Bonus Tracks on 1998 CD Reissue

No.	Title	Writer(s)	Length
13.	"Laying Blame"	Murphy	3:42
14.	"Rag Doll"	Pentland	3:11

LP2: The Demos and Outtakes (2024 3LP Deluxe Expanded Reissue)
No.	Title	Writer(s)	Length
15.	"Kool Aid" (March 1990 Chris demo)	Murphy	3:49
16.	"Left Of Centre" (February 1991 demo)	Scott/Murphy	1:59
17.	"In Her Place" (February 1991 demo)	Murphy	3:33
18.	"Pretty Voice" (1991 Jay demo)	Ferguson	4:09
19.	"Caroline" (1991 demo)	Murphy	7:05
20.	"Underwhelmed" (1991 demo)	Murphy	5:21
21.	"500 Up" (1991 demo)	Scott/Pentland	4:53
22.	"Marcus Said" (October 28, 1991 demo)	Murphy	4:25
23.	"Raspberry" (October 28, 1991 demo)	Murphy	3:47
24.	"Median Strip" (Andrew vocal)	Scott/Murphy	3:58

LP 3: Live at McGill University, June 17, 1993 (2024 Deluxe Expanded Reissue)
No.	Title	Writer(s)	Length
25.	"Median Strip"	Scott/Murphy	4:40
26.	"Take It In"	Murphy	4:44
27.	"Sugartune"	Pentland	3:56
28.	"Pillow Fight"	Ferguson	3:21
29.	"Coax Me"	Murphy	3:11
30.	"Underwhelmed"	Murphy	4:40
31.	"Penpals"	Murphy	3:30
32.	"I Am The Cancer"	Murphy	3:45
33.	"Rag Doll"	Pentland	5:39
34.	"Left Of Centre"	Scott/Murphy	4:01

7” single (2024 Deluxe Expanded Reissue)
No.	Title	Writer(s)	Length
35.	"Autobiography" (Previously unreleased; live from The Grawood, Halifax, March 20, 1992)	Murphy	3:35
36.	"Easily Fooled" (Previously unreleased; live from The Grawood, Halifax, March 20, 1992)	Pentland	3:01

== Credits ==
- Jay Ferguson – guitar, vocals
- Chris Murphy – bass, vocals, erased guitar
- Patrick Pentland – guitar, vocals, bass
- Andrew Scott – drums, vocals, guitar
- Jennifer Pierce – backing vocals ("I Am the Cancer" & "Marcus Said")
