= Never Hear the End of It =

Studio album by Sloan
- Released: September 19, 2006
- Recorded: 2006
- Genre: Rock, power pop
- Length: 76:26
- Label: Sony BMG Canada, Yep Roc, Murderecords
- Producer: Nick Detoro, Sloan

Sloan chronology
A Sides Win: Singles 1992-2005 (2005)	Never Hear the End of It (2006)	Parallel Play (2008)

Singles from Never Hear the End of It
- 1. "Who Taught You to Live Like That?" Released: 2006; 2. "Ill Placed Trust" Released: November 2006; 3. "I've Gotta Try" Released: 2007

Professional ratings
Review scores
Source	Rating
Allmusic	4.5/5 stars
Rolling Stone	3/5 stars
CHARTattack	3.5/5 stars
Jam!	3.5/5 stars
Pitchfork	7.7/10

Never Hear the End of It is the eighth album by Canadian rock band Sloan, released on September 19, 2006 in Canada and in the US on January 9, 2007. The record's first single was "Who Taught You to Live Like That?", while "Ill Placed Trust" was launched as a second single in November. The album debuted at #29 on the Canadian Albums Chart and peaked at #48 on the Billboard Heatseekers chart, making it the band's first album to chart in the U.S.

The CD release of the album included all 30 songs contained on a single disc, while vinyl pressings were issued as a double LP. At 76 minutes and 26 seconds, it boasts the longest running time of Sloan's studio albums—exceeded only by the 4 Nights at the Palais Royale live double album.

A video for the track "I've Gotta Try" was also released and charted on Canada's MuchMoreMusic.

The song "Flying High Again" was used in a 2007 episode of America's Funniest Home Videos in a montage of hang gliding accidents.

== Track listing ==
All tracks are written by Sloan.

No.	Title	Lead vocals	Length
1.	"Flying High Again"	C. Murphy, A. Scott, J. Ferguson, P. Pentland	1:25
2.	"Who Taught You to Live Like That?"	J. Ferguson	3:02
3.	"I've Gotta Try"	A. Scott	2:22
4.	"Everybody Wants You"	C. Murphy	3:07
5.	"Listen to the Radio"	P. Pentland	3:09
6.	"Fading into Obscurity"	C. Murphy	4:10
7.	"I Can't Sleep"	A. Scott	0:52
8.	"Someone I Can Be True With"	C. Murphy	1:32
9.	"Right or Wrong"	J. Ferguson	2:40
10.	"Something's Wrong"	A. Scott	1:15
11.	"Ana Lucia"	C. Murphy	3:21
12.	"Before the End of the Race"	J. Ferguson	2:27
13.	"Blackout"	A. Scott	1:39
14.	"I Understand"	P. Pentland	5:28
15.	"You Know What It's About"	C. Murphy	1:14
16.	"Golden Eyes"	A. Scott	1:01
17.	"Can't You Figure It Out?"	J. Ferguson	2:27
18.	"Set in Motion"	C. Murphy	2:35
19.	"Love Is All Around"	A. Scott	3:21
20.	"Will I Belong?"	C. Murphy	1:20
21.	"Ill Placed Trust"	P. Pentland	3:26
22.	"Live the Life You're Dreaming of"	C. Murphy	4:08
23.	"Living with the Masses"	A. Scott	1:36
24.	"HFXNSHC"	P. Pentland	1:11
25.	"People Think They Know Me"	C. Murphy	2:12
26.	"I Know You"	A. Scott	4:00
27.	"Last Time in Love"	C. Murphy	3:36
28.	"It's Not the End of the World"	C. Murphy	2:28
29.	"Light Years"	J. Ferguson	1:51
30.	"Another Way I Could Do It"	C. Murphy	3:31
Total length:			76:26

Bonus tracks:
No.	Title	Length
31.	"Even Though (P. Pentland)" (iTunes bonus track)	3:53
32.	"The Best Part of Your Life (P. Pentland)" (iTunes bonus track)	4:16
