= The Enclave (record label) =

The Enclave was an American record label founded in the mid-1990s by Tom Zutaut, former A&R executive for Geffen Records best known for signing Guns N' Roses. "He's great," observed Amanda Rootes of his signings Fluffy. "Very American, very cool, very into his artists."

The label was distributed by EMI. It was shut down in June 1997 when EMI Music decided to fold it into Virgin Records.

The label was briefly re-established in 1997 when it moved over to Mercury. As it had seemingly survived the merger between Mercury parent PolyGram and Universal, it was finally shuttered in 1999 by Island/Def Jam Music Group, leading to the departure of Zutaut.

In addition to Fluffy, artists signed to The Enclave included World Party, September 67, Sloan, Belle & Sebastian, The C-60s, Drain STH, Vaselyn, Scratching Post, Sweet Water, Anna Wilson, and Full Devil Jacket.
