= Murderecords =

Canadian independent record label

- Parent company: MCA
- Founded: 1992
- Founder: Sloan
- Genre: Alternative rock Grunge (early years); Indie rock
- Country of origin: Canada
- Location: Halifax, Nova Scotia; Toronto, Ontario
- Official website: sloanmusic.com/murderecords

Murderecords is an independent record label that releases the music of the Canadian rock band Sloan. Originally formed in 1992 to produce just the records of that band, it later released work of other bands including Eric's Trip, The Hardship Post, Al Tuck, Stinkin' Rich, Hip Club Groove, The Inbreds, Thrush Hermit, and The Super Friendz, and was Canada's best-known indie label in the 1990s. Later, the roster was stripped bare, and released Sloan albums exclusively for nearly a decade. In 2008, however, albums by Will Currie and the Country French and Pony Da Look were released by the label.

== Releases and artists ==
- mur001 Sloan — Peppermint EP (cd/cass)
- mur002 Eric's Trip — Peter EP (cd/cass)
- mur003 Hardship Post — Hack EP (cd/cass)
- mur004 Thrush Hermit — Smart Bomb EP (cd/cass)
- mur005 Eric's Trip/Sloan — Stove/Smother b/w Laying Blame (split 7-inch vinyl)
- mur006 Al Tuck and No Action — Arhoolie (cass only)
- mur007 Hardship Post — Why Don't You and I Smooth Things Over (7-inch vinyl)
- mur008 Al Tuck and No Action — Brave Last Days EP (cd/cass)
- mur009 Stinkin' Rich — Stolen Bass (7-inch vinyl)
- mur010 Hip Club Groove — Trailer Park Hip Hop EP (cd/cass)
- mur011 Sloan — Twice Removed (full length 12-inch vinyl only)
- mur012 The Super Friendz — By Request (7-inch vinyl)
- mur013 Local Rabbits — Put On Your Snowsuit You're Going To Hell (7-inch vinyl)
- mur014 Sloan — Stood Up / Same Old Flame (7-inch vinyl)
- mur015 Stinkin’ Rich — Game Tight (cassette only)
- mur016 Thrush Hermit — The Great Pacific Ocean EP(CD/cass/vinyl)
- mur017 The Super Friendz — Mock Up, Scale Down (CD)
- mur018 Jale — Closed EP (CD/cass/12")
- mur019 Edgefest Murderecords EP — The Super Friendz — One Day the Warner /Jale — Frightened of / Thrush Hermit -West Island Rockers / Stinkin Rich (Buck 65) — By Design (7-inch vinyl)
- mur020 Zumpano — The Only Reason Under The Sun (7-inch vinyl)
- mur021 Local Rabbits — You Can't Touch This (CD/cass)
- mur022 Richard Davies — There's Never Been A Crowd Like This (CD/cass)
- mur023 Sloan — One Chord to Another (CD/cass/vinyl)
- mur024 The Super Friendz — Play the Game, Not Games EP (10-inch vinyl)
- mur025 The Super Friendz — Slide Show (CD/vinyl)
- mur026 Sloan — Rhodes Jam (7-inch vinyl)
- mur026 Thrush Hermit — Giddy With The Drugs / The Ugly Details (7-inch vinyl)
- mur028 Neco Litteris Mando Excerpta 97–98 (CD sampler of The Super Friendz, Local Rabbits, The Inbreds and Sloan)
- mur029 The Inbreds — Kombinator (CD)
- mur030 The Inbreds — It's Sydney or the Bush (CD)
- mur031 The Inbreds — Moustache/Reason Why I'm Shy (7-inch vinyl)
- mur032 The Vees — The Vees EP (CD)
- mur033(a) & * mur033(b) Local Rabbits (a) British Knights Coalition: Consolidation & Strike (Stomp Your BK's Down) (b) Pops & Company (Disco Version) (7-inch vinyl)
- mur034 The Inbreds — Winning Hearts (CD)
- mur035 Local Rabbits — Basic Concept (CD)
- mur036 Sloan — Navy Blues (CD/cass/vinyl)
- mur037 Sloan — Smeared (CD)
- mur038 Elevator Through — Original Music From the Motion Picture "The Such" (CD)
- mur039 Sloan — 4 Nights at the Palais Royale (2×CD/3x vinyl)
- mur040 Sloan — Between the Bridges (CD/cass/vinyl)
- mur041 Sloan — Second Hand Views (VHS)
- mur042 Sloan — Pretty Together (CD/vinyl)
- mur043 Sloan — Never Hear The End Of It (vinyl)
- mur044 Sloan — Keepin' The Tour Alive: US Action Pact Tour 2004 (vinyl)
- mur045 Pony Da Look — Shattered Dimensions
- mur046 Will Currie & The Country French — A Great Stage
- mur047 Sloan — Parallel Play (CD/vinyl)
- mur048 Sloan — Hit & Run EP (Digital)
- mur049 Sloan — B Sides Win: extras, bonus tracks and b-sides 1992-2008 (digital)
- mur050 Sloan — The Double Cross (CD/vinyl)
- mur051 Sloan — Is That All I Get? (1993 September Twentieth - Recorded Live On Patrick's Birthday) (vinyl)
- mur052 Sloan — Australia 1999 (vinyl)
- mur053 Sloan — Jenny b/w It's In You, It's In Me (7-inch vinyl & digital)
- mur054 Sloan — Twice Removed (Vinyl Box/Digital)
- mur055 V/A — Murderecords 7-inch Singles 1993-1998 (7-inch vinyl, book and digital)
- mur056 The Super Friendz — Mock Up, Scale Down (vinyl)
- mur057 Sloan — Japan 2002 (Vinyl/digital)
- mur058 Sloan — Commonwealth (CD/vinyl/digital)
- mur059 Sloan — 4 extra songs EP
- mur060 Sloan — One Chord to Another (Vinyl Box/Digital)
- mur061 Sloan — Kids Come Back Again at Christmas/December 25 7”
- mur062 Sloan — 12 LP
- mur063 Sloan — Navy Blues reissue box set
- mur064 Matthew Grimson, Prize for Writing
- mur065 Cola Wars — s/t 12-inch vinyl EP
- mur066 Sloan — B Sides Win Vol.1 1992-1997 (LP, Comp, Ltd, Blu)
- mur067 TUNS — Duly Noted (LP/Digital)
- mur068 ??
- mur069 Sloan — Silence Trumps Lies (File, MP3, Single)
- mur070 Sloan — B Sides Win Vol.2 1998-2001 (LP, Comp, Ltd, Pur)
- mur071 Sloan — This One's An Original... (LP, Ltd, Cle)
- mur072 - The Flashing Lights - Where The Change Is (LP, Album, Ltd, RE, RM, Blue Translucent)
- mur073 Sloan — Steady (CD/LP/Digital)
- mur074 Sloan — Never Heard The Demo Of It (2x7" LP)
- mur075 Sloan — One Chord to Another - the Demos (cass)
- mur076 - Sloan — Alive & Alright (2×LP, Album, Ltd)
- mur077 Sloan — Smeared (3xLP, 1x7"LP, Reissue Box Set, Deluxe Edition, Ltd)
- mur078 Hardship Post — Hardship Post 1992-1994 (2xLP, Compilation, Ltd)
- mur079 Sloan — B Sides Win Vol.3 2003-2011 (LP, Comp, Ltd, Green Translucent)
- mur080 The Pursuit Of Happiness — Live In Concert 1990 (LP, Ltd)
- mur081 Sloan — Based On The Best Seller (CD/LP/Digital)
- mur082 The Super Friendz — 1994 The Early Recordings (LP, Ltd)
- mur083 Wite Out - Actually, I Think It’s Fun (7" single, Ltd)

== See also ==
- List of record labels
