= Jay Ferguson (Canadian musician) =

Canadian rock musician

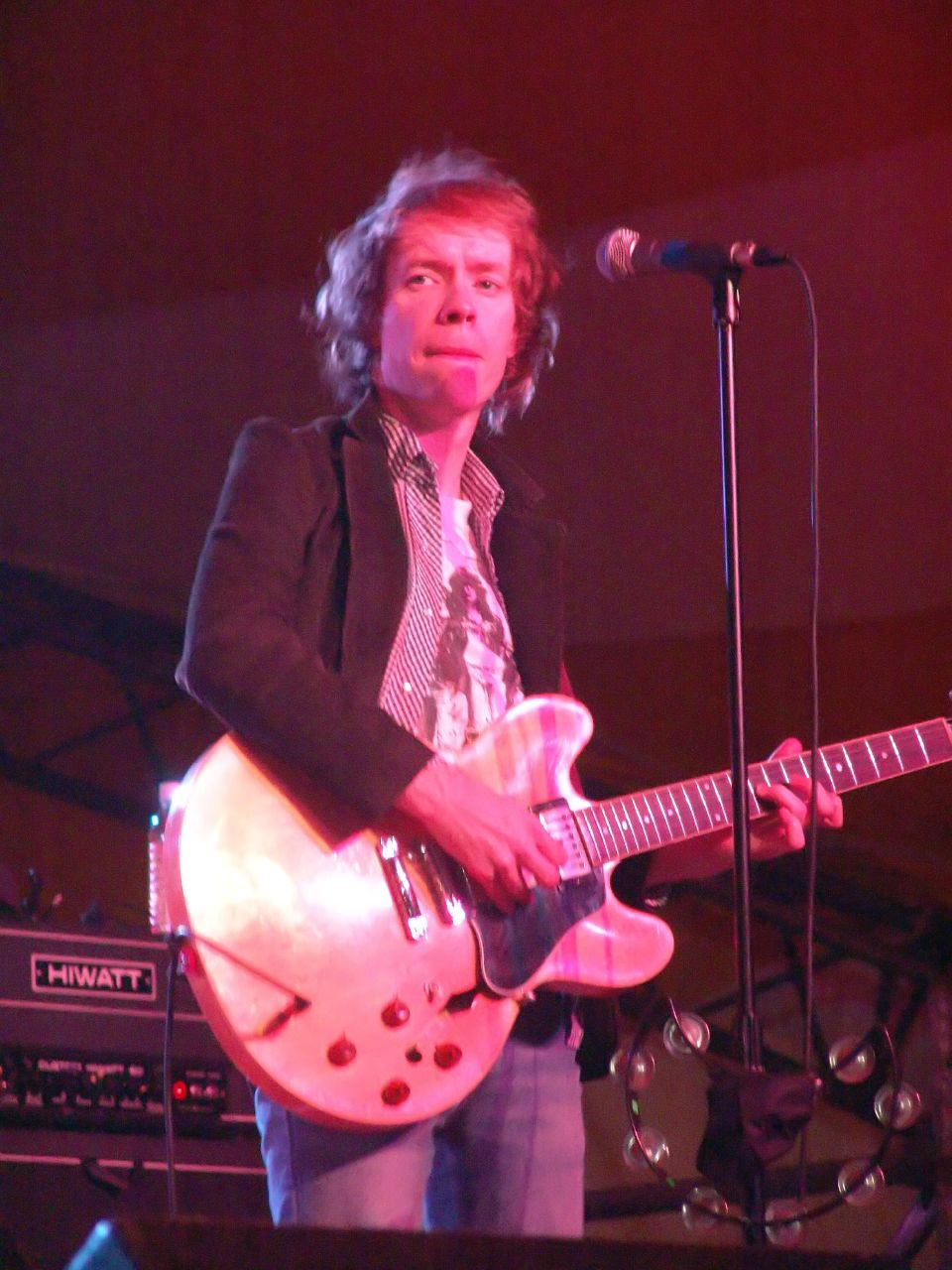
- Ferguson performing with Sloan at the Sudbury Summerfest 2007 in Sudbury, Ontario

Background information
- Born: October 14, 1968 (age 58)
- Origin: Halifax, Nova Scotia, Canada
- Genre: Indie rock
- Occupation: Musician
- Instruments: Guitar, bass, vocals
- Years active: 1991–present
- Label: Murderecords
- Website: sloanmusic.com

John Howard "Jay" Ferguson III (born October 14, 1968) is a Canadian musician and a member of the rock band Sloan.

== Biography ==
When Ferguson was 12 years old, he was given a job at Ol'Dan's Records, a secondhand record store. Before joining Sloan, Ferguson was in a band with Chris Murphy from 1987 to 1990 called Kearney Lake Road. In 1991, Ferguson and Murphy started Sloan along with Patrick Pentland and Andrew Scott. Ferguson plays rhythm guitar and occasionally bass and drums. Some of Ferguson's songwriting contributions, each of which he sings lead vocals on, are "I Hate My Generation" from the album Twice Removed, "The Lines You Amend" from One Chord to Another, "Who Taught You to Live Like That?" from the album Never Hear the End of It, "Witch's Wand" from the album Parallel Play, "You've Got a Lot on Your Mind" from the album Commonwealth, and "Right to Roam" from the 2018 album 12.

In December 2005, Ferguson began hosting a show on CBC Radio 3 with Sloan bandmate Chris Murphy. Their show broadcasts Saturday and Sunday on Sirius Satellite Radio station (channel 94).

Ferguson also collaborates with other musicians and can be heard on Gentleman Reg's 2004 release Darby & Joan. He also occasionally DJs at Toronto area clubs.

In 2005, Halifax musician Mary Cobham released an album about the Sloan member called Songs in the Key of Jay, which explores themes of Teenie-Bop magazines and her long-standing crush on Jay Ferguson.

== Personal life ==
Ferguson is the only member in Sloan originally from Nova Scotia.
