= Andrew Scott (drummer) =

Canadian musician (born 1967)

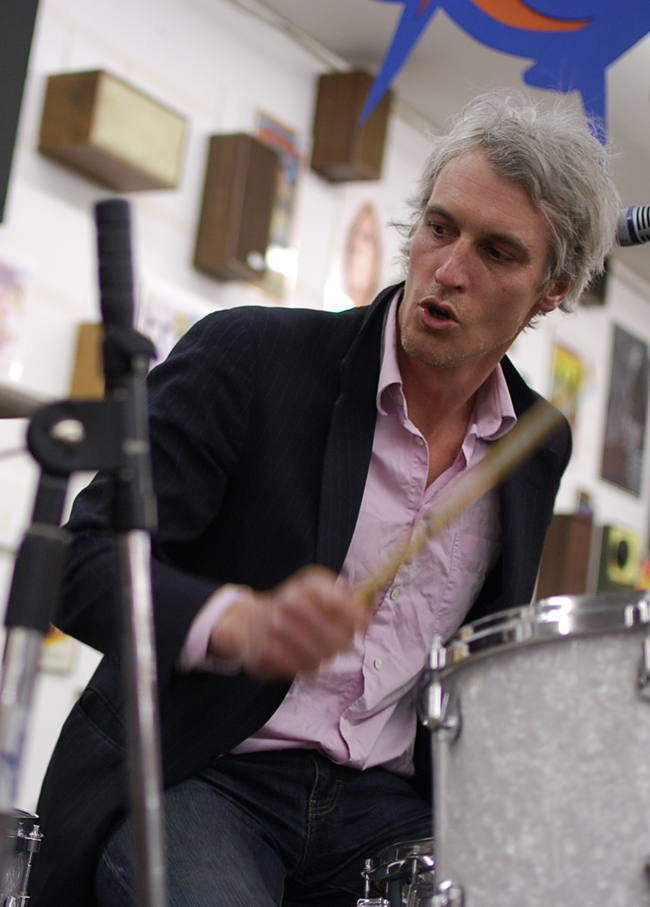
- Scott in 2010

Background information
- Born: Andrew Walter Gibson Scott; November 15, 1967 (age 58); Ottawa, Ontario, Canada
- Origin: Halifax, Nova Scotia, Canada
- Genres: Indie rock
- Occupation: Musician
- Instruments: Drum kit, guitar
- Years active: 1991–present
- Label: Murderecords
- Member of: Sloan
- Website: www.sloanmusic.com

Andrew Walter Gibson Scott (born November 15, 1967) is a Canadian musician. Primarily a drummer, he has been a member of the band Sloan since 1991.

== Musical career ==
His first bands include No Damn Fears, which featured Dave Marsh (The Super Friendz / Joel Plaskett Emergency), Jennifer Pierce (jale), and Matt Murphy (The Super Friendz), which released one cassette, titled Spring 1990 (recorded in 1989), prior to breaking up., and Oreo Reverse.

After attending the Nova Scotia College of Art & Design University, Scott joined Chris Murphy, Jay Ferguson, and Patrick Pentland in Sloan. Scott also plays guitar and occasionally sings lead vocals with the band, usually on songs he has written. Three of his songs, "500 Up" (included on the 1992 album Smeared), "People of the Sky", and "I've Gotta Try" (from the 2006 album Never Hear the End of It), have been released by Sloan as singles.

== Personal life ==
Scott was born in Ottawa, Ontario. Once the holder of a Nova Scotia high school high jump record, Scott abandoned his athletic aspirations to become a visual artist.

Scott is married to actress and writer Fiona Highet. They have two children—a daughter, Stirling, and a son, Alistair.
