= Sloan (band) =

Canadian rock band

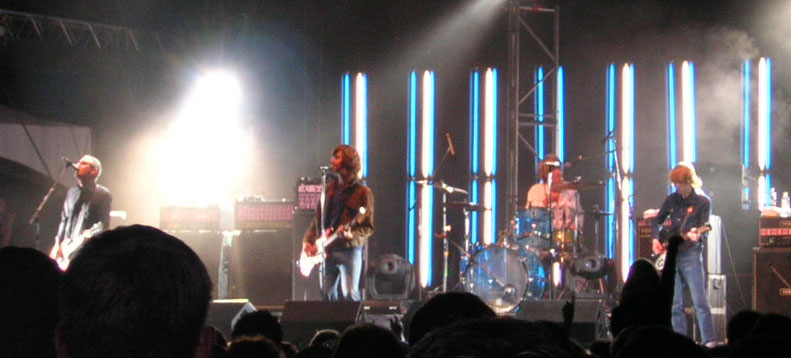
- Sloan performing at Olympic Island in Toronto, Ontario, 2004

Background information
- Origin: Halifax, Nova Scotia, Canada
- Genres: Rock, alternative rock, power pop, indie rock
- Years active: 1991–present
- Labels: Murderecords, Yep Roc, Sony BMG, Geffen, Outside Music
- Spinoffs: Anyway Gang; Trans-Canada Highwaymen
- Members: Jay Ferguson; Chris Murphy; Patrick Pentland; Andrew Scott
- Website: sloanmusic.com

Sloan is a Canadian rock band formed in Halifax, Nova Scotia in 1991. Sloan has released fourteen full-length albums and has received nine Juno Award nominations, winning one. Between 1996 and 2016, Sloan was among the top 75 best-selling Canadian artists in Canada and among the top 25 best-selling Canadian bands in Canada. The band is known for the sharing of songwriting and lead vocals from each member of the group and their unaltered line-up throughout their career. Although formed in Halifax, the band is now based in Toronto.

Official Sloan logo

== History ==
=== Formation (1986–1991) ===
Chris Murphy was introduced to Jay Ferguson through Matt Murphy in 1986. The three played together in a band called "The Deluxe Boys". The group disbanded in 1987 and Ferguson and Murphy formed the band Kearney Lake Rd. with Henri Sangalang in October of that year. In 1989, Murphy met and befriended Andrew Scott. Kearney Lake Rd. broke up in early 1990. That same year, Murphy and Scott were attending the Nova Scotia College of Art and Design (NSCAD) in Halifax and began jamming together. Ferguson started jamming with Murphy and Scott and they began searching for a bass player. Murphy knew of Patrick Pentland's vocal and guitar abilities from Pentland's previous bands and offered him a spot in the band. Pentland accepted, and Sloan was formed in late January 1991. The band's name comes from their friend, Jason Larsen. Larsen had been nicknamed "Slow One" by his boss, though it sounded more like "Sloan" in the boss's French accent. The original agreement was that they could name the band after Larsen as long as he was on the cover of their first album. As a result, it is Larsen who appears on the cover of the Peppermint EP.

=== Geffen Records, Peppermint EP (1991–1992) ===
On February 8, 1991, Sloan played their first concert at an art show at NSCAD University. Murphy and Pentland switched roles shortly after, with Pentland now playing guitar and Murphy playing bass. Through a battle of the bands-type gig, the band earned a spot on the DTK Records compilation Here and Now and a session with local producer Terry Pulliam at his Soundmarket Studios. The band took the opportunity to record an album's worth of songs. One of the songs recorded was "Underwhelmed", which was selected for the Hear and Now '92 compilation. The band attracted interest from Canadian record labels Nettwerk and MCA Canada. After attracting interest from Todd Sullivan, an A&R representative at Geffen Records, a copy of Sloan's Pulliam sessions was sent to Sullivan. After seeing Sloan perform in Vancouver, Sullivan committed to Sloan and the band signed to Geffen in the summer of 1992. That same year, Sloan released their first recording, the EP Peppermint. It was released on the band's own label, Murderecords.

=== Smeared, Twice Removed (1992–1994) ===
On October 1, 1992, Sloan released their debut full-length album, Smeared, on Geffen in Canada. Smeared was released in the United States in January 1993. The lead single from the album was a re-recorded version of "Underwhelmed", which was a hit in Canada and peaked at No. 25 on Billboard's Modern Rock Tracks chart in the U.S. In 1993, Sloan embarked on a 10-week North American tour, which included dates opening for The Lemonheads. 1993 was also the debut of SloanNet, one of the first Canadian music fan community on the World Wide Web.

The band then later began recording their second album. The recordings for the album were a departure from the shoegazer-grunge style on the band's previous album, which did not please Geffen. When Sloan refused Geffen's request to re-record the album, Geffen pulled promotional support for it. In 1994, the band released the second album, which was titled Twice Removed. Spin named the album one of the "Best Albums You Didn't Hear" in 1994.

=== One Chord to Another to Pretty Together (1995–2001) ===
In early 1995, rumours began circulating that Sloan was contemplating breaking up. Though they played a handful of shows in the summer of 1995, including a headlining gig at Edgefest, the band did indeed consider themselves broken up by late 1995. Even so, Sloan decided to release another album to help their Murderecords label financially and boost its profile. Though Geffen wanted to keep Sloan on the label, the band wanted to leave and Sloan was released from the label. In 1996, Sloan released One Chord to Another on Murderecords in Canada. The album featured three hit singles and would go on to sell over 80,000 copies, becoming their best-selling album in Canada to date. In 1997, the band won their first Juno Award, winning the "Best Alternative Album" award for One Chord to Another. In 1998, the band released Navy Blues, which was certified gold in Canada. In 1999, Sloan released their first live album, 4 Nights at the Palais Royale. The live album was followed that same year by their next studio album, Between the Bridges. In 2001, Sloan signed a licensing agreement with BMG Music Canada. That same year, Sloan released their next album, Pretty Together.

=== Action Pact, A Sides Win (2003–2005) ===
Sloan made a concerted effort to break into the US market on their 2003 release Action Pact. Songs were recorded in Los Angeles with Tom Rothrock producing. The glossier, radio-ready sound failed to raise Sloan's profile in the US, though they continued to be popular in Canada.

In 2005, Sloan released their first compilation album, A Sides Win: Singles 1992-2005. The album included two new songs, "All Used Up" and "Try to Make It". The Japanese release included two additional new tracks.

=== Yep Roc Records, Never Hear the End of It, Parallel Play (2006–2008) ===
Now signed to Yep Roc Records for their US releases, Sloan released their eighth album, entitled Never Hear the End of It, in 2006. The album contained 30 tracks with all the members of the band contributing new songs. It was met with widespread critical acclaim and became the first Sloan album to chart in the United States. In 2008, Sloan followed up their longest album with their shortest ever release at the time, Parallel Play.

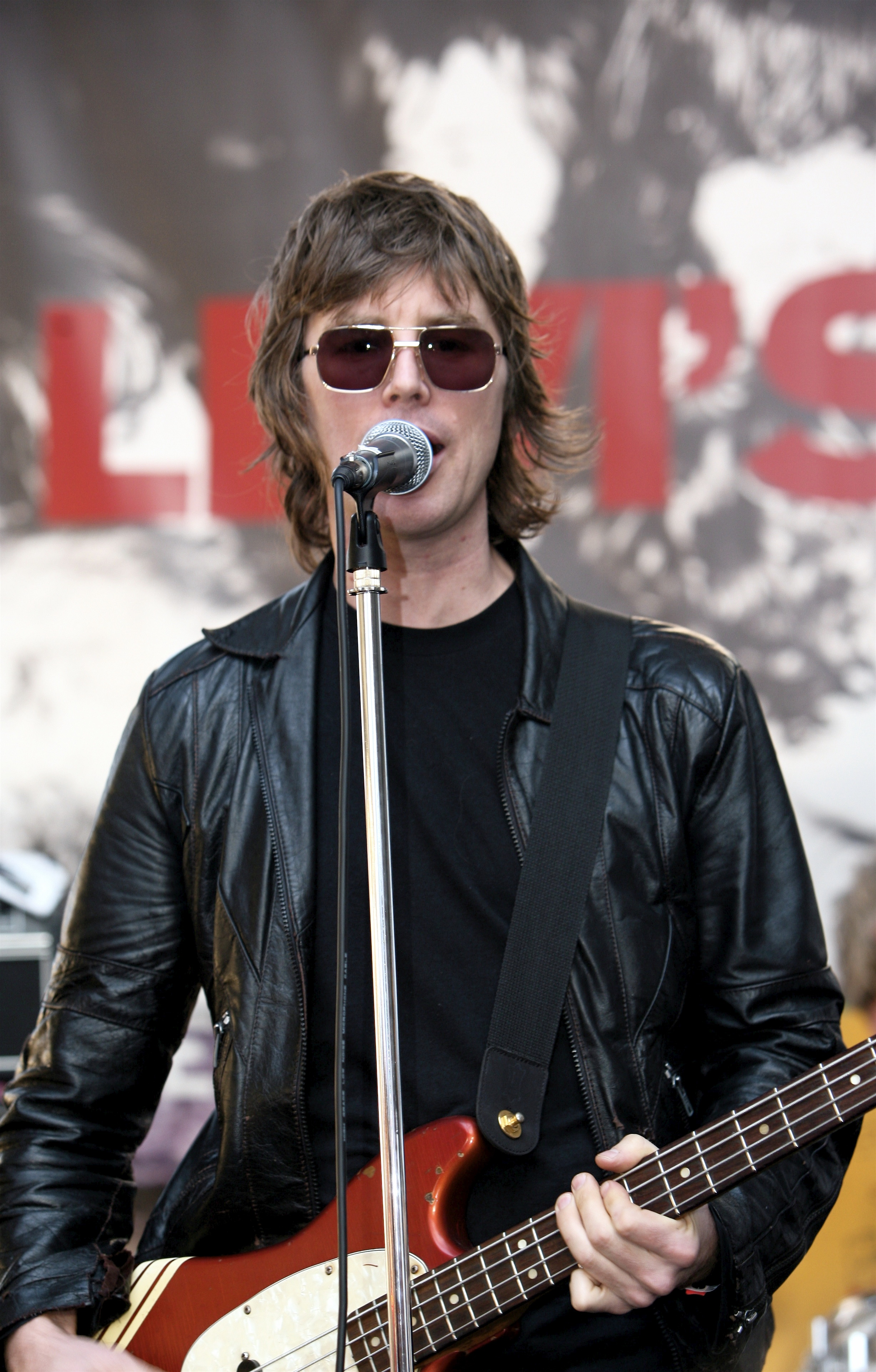
Chris Murphy of Sloan performing at South by Southwest (2007).

=== Hit & Run and B-Sides Win (2009–2010) ===
In November 2009, Sloan added a digital music store to their website. To promote the store, the band released an online-only EP titled Hit & Run. The song Take It Upon Yourself was released as a free single. In February 2010, the band released another online exclusive, the compilation album B-Sides Win: Extras, Bonus Tracks and B-Sides 1992–2008.

=== The Double Cross, Twice Removed reissue (2011–2013) ===
Sloan announced plans to release a 10th album in 2011, to coincide with the 20th anniversary of their first show.

On February 22, 2011, Sloan announced that their new album would be released on May 10, 2011. The album was entitled The Double Cross, a nod to their 20th (or XX) anniversary. The album was preceded by its first single, "Unkind".

In promotion of the new album, a special video series produced and directed by Catherine Stockhausen was launched on YouTube to celebrate the band's success and renown. The videos featured interviews with musicians and celebrities such as Jason Schwartzman, Joel Plaskett, Stefan Brogren, Dave Foley, Kevin Drew, Buck 65, Sebastien Grainger, The Dears, Ian D'Sa and Benjamin Kowalewicz from Billy Talent, K-OS, and Dave Hamlin.

Following the completion of touring for The Double Cross, Sloan reissued and toured behind Twice Removed as a three-record vinyl box set containing the original album, rarities and demos. They toured North America, where they played Twice Removed in its entirety, followed by additional sets of songs that don't appear on the album.

On April 24, 2013, Sloan announced the release of a hardcore punk 7" single, Jenny b/w It's In You, It's In Me. Pre-orders of the single also included a T-shirt portraying the band members circa 1985, and a bonus digital download of 12 additional hardcore covers performed by Sloan. Some of the bands covered included Minor Threat, The Descendents, Angry Samoans, 7 Seconds, Black Flag and The Nils. In 2021, Sloan compiled and released the two originals and all 12 punk covers together as part of the 12” vinyl album, This One’s an Original.

Between 2011 and 2013, Sloan also released three limited edition live "bootleg" LPs from their archives: Is That All I Get? (1993 September Twentieth – Recorded Live On Patrick's Birthday) (2011), Australia 1999 (2012), and Japan 2002 (2013).

=== Commonwealth, 20th anniversary of One Chord to Another (2013–2017) ===
In 2013, the band revealed plans for a double album, with each of the four sides featuring a solo suite by a different band member. In May 2014, it was announced that the new album would be titled Commonwealth and would be released in September 2014. On July 14, 2014, the band announced the official release date for the album and the release of the album's first single, "Keep Swinging (Downtown)". In 2016, Sloan released a deluxe vinyl box set of their 1996 album, One Chord To Another, which contained the original album, rarities and demos. To mark that record's 20th anniversary, Sloan also toured North America, where they played the OCTA album in its entirety. In November 2016, Sloan released a Christmas single on limited edition, red translucent 7" vinyl, featuring two new songs, "Kids Come Back Again at Christmas" and "December 25".

=== 12 (2018–2020) ===
On February 5, 2018, Sloan announced that their twelfth record would be called 12. Advance track releases included "The Day Will Be Mine", "Spin Our Wheels" (the album's lead single), "Right to Roam," and "44 Teenagers." The album was released on April 6, 2018. The album's debut marked Sloan's highest ever position on the Billboard Heatseekers chart, reaching No. 11. The band then set off on a 30-date North American tour in support of the album.

In late 2019, Sloan released their third deluxe vinyl box set – this time for their 1998 album, Navy Blues. This release contained the original album, rarities and demos. To celebrate the box set's release, Sloan embarked on a tour of North America that extended into 2020, in which they performed the Navy Blues album in its entirety.

=== Steady (2021–2024) ===
In July 2021, it was reported that Sloan was working on their thirteenth album; they hoped to release it in the fall of 2022.

Sloan officially announced Steady, on July 13, 2022. The band released the song "Spend the Day" on streaming platforms the same day. On August 17, Sloan released the album's official lead single, "Scratch the Surface", along with an accompanying music video. Steady was released on October 21, 2022. Sloan toured to promote Steady in Canada from October 2022 to March 2023. They commenced a US leg of the tour in April 2023; the band also toured in the US on select dates between June 22 and June 30, 2023.

In November 2023, Sloan released the LP Alive & Alright on limited edition vinyl; it was originally recorded in 2000.

In May 2024, Sloan released an anniversary deluxe reissue of their debut LP Smeared, at their annual Murderecords Garage sale. They also played throughout Canada during the summer of 2024.

In November 2024, in part due to the Smeared reissue boxed set, the band performed two shows at Toronto’s Concert Hall. The shows featured the complete Smeared LP as a first set, and the era’s b-sides and outtakes as the second set; it also featured Jennifer Pierce on select songs.

In May 2025, the band released B-Sides Win: Vol. 3: 2003-2011 on vinyl at their Murderecords Garage sale.

=== Based on the Best Seller (2024–present) ===
Sloan started work on a new LP in late 2024. In June 2025, the band announced their fourteenth studio LP, titled Based on the Best Seller. Sloan also released the first track from the LP, "Live Forever" to streaming platform; they also shared the album's release date of September 26, 2025. Sloan toured for the new LP in 2025 and 2026.

The song "No Damn Fears" was longlisted for the 2026 SOCAN Polaris Song Prize.

== Songwriting, live performances ==
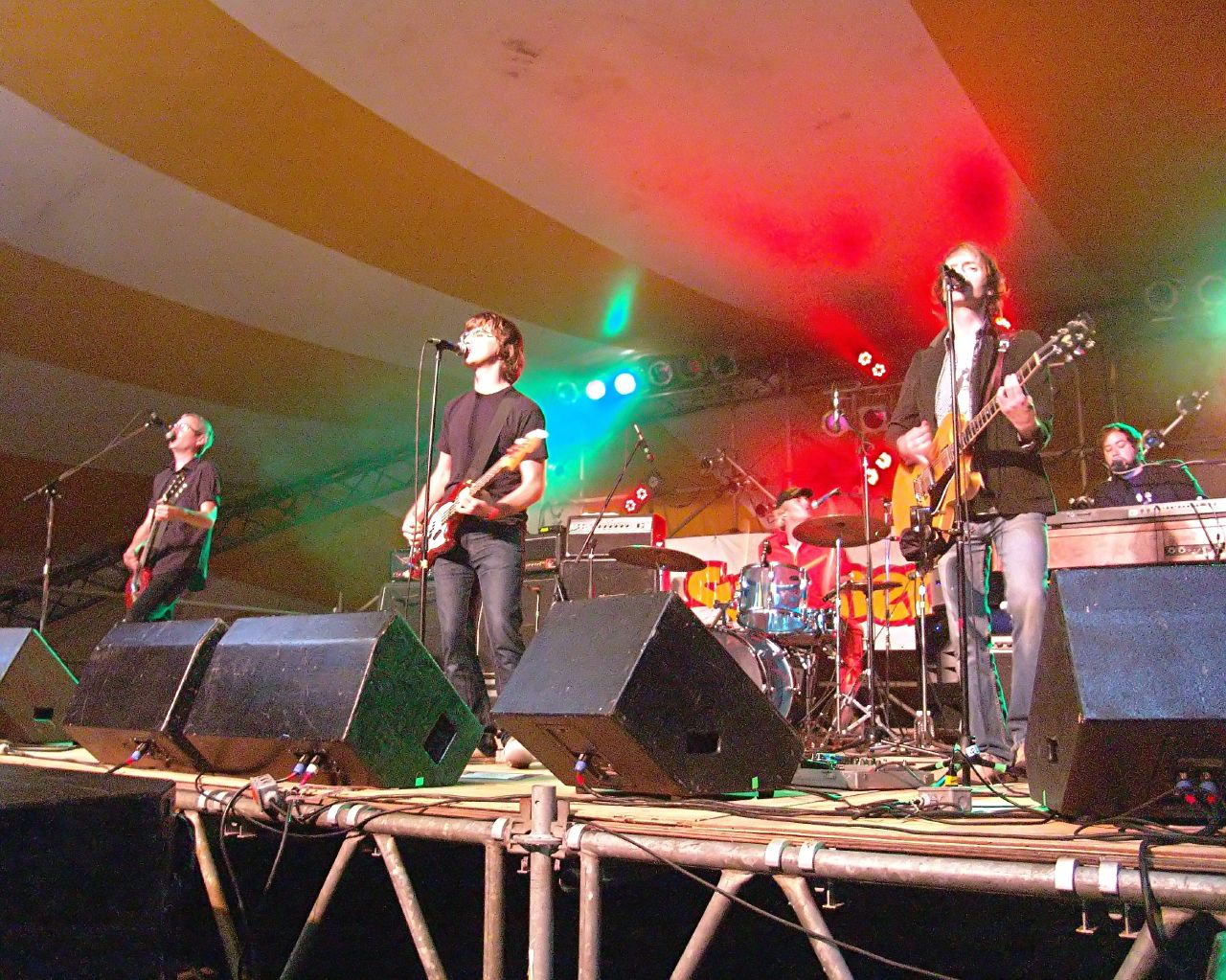
Sloan performing at the Deep River Summerfest 2007 in Deep River, Ontario.

All four members of Sloan write and sing their own songs; when they play live, they switch instruments accordingly. The band typically performs as follows: Murphy plays bass, Pentland plays lead guitar, Ferguson plays rhythm guitar, and Scott plays drums. Scott plays guitar while singing his songs, while Ferguson switches to bass and Murphy switches to drums. Prior to 2006's Never Hear the End of It, Ferguson and Scott would also play electric piano on songs that called for it. Multi-instrumentalist Gregory Macdonald has handled all keyboard duties live and in the studio since 2006. Murphy and Pentland would be considered the two main vocalists as they sing lead on the majority of the band's songs and contribute back-up/harmony vocals to all of them.

While Murphy has written more of the band's songs than any of the other members, particularly on the band's first two albums, Pentland is nonetheless responsible for having written a majority of Sloan's most recognizable hits. Every member of the group has contributed at least one song per album, with the lone exception being 2003's Action Pact on which Scott has no songs. According to Eye Weekly, that album's producer, Tom Rothrock, essentially randomly selected tracks out of the band's submissions in the interest of creating a more streamlined sound. Also, Scott's songwriting output at that time may have been somewhat diminished because he had recently become a father.

== Members ==
- Jay Ferguson – vocals, rhythm guitar, bass guitar (1991–present)
- Chris Murphy – vocals, bass guitar, drums (1991–present)
- Patrick Pentland – vocals, lead guitar (1991–present)
- Andrew Scott – vocals, drums, rhythm guitar (1991–present)

Touring members

- Gregory Macdonald – Keyboards, percussion, backing vocals, guitar (2006–present)

== Discography ==
=== Studio albums ===
Year	Album
1992	Smeared
1994	Twice Removed
1996	One Chord to Another
1998	Navy Blues
1999	Between the Bridges
2001	Pretty Together
2003	Action Pact
2006	Never Hear the End of It
2008	Parallel Play
2011	The Double Cross
2014	Commonwealth
2018	12
2022	Steady
2025	Based on the Best Seller

== Honours and awards ==
In 1996, a reader poll by Canadian music magazine Chart! ranked Twice Removed as the best Canadian album of all time, only two years after its release. The same poll in 2000 ranked the album third, behind Joni Mitchell's Blue and Neil Young's Harvest. However, the 2005 poll once again ranked the album first. The band has also been nominated for several Juno Awards, winning one in 1997 for Best Alternative Album for One Chord to Another.

=== Juno Awards ===
- 1994: Nominated – Best New Group
- 1995: Nominated – Best Alternative Album (Twice Removed)
- 1997: Won – Best Alternative Album (One Chord to Another)
- 1999: Nominated – Best Rock Album (Navy Blues)
- 2000: Nominated – Best Album Design (Catherine Stockhausen and Lee Towndrow, Between the Bridges)
- 2002: Nominated – Best Rock Album (Pretty Together)
- 2002: Nominated – Best Single ("If It Feels Good Do It")
- 2007: Nominated – Best Rock Album (Never Hear the End of It)
- 2009: Nominated – Best Rock Album (Parallel Play)
- 2012: Nominated – Best Rock Album (The Double Cross)

=== East Coast Music Awards ===
- 1993: Nominated – Album of the Year (Smeared), Entertainer of the Year, Pop Rock Recording of the Year, Song of the Year ("Underwhelmed"), Video of the Year ("Underwhelmed")
- 1996: Won – Alternative Recording of the Year
  - Nominated – Pop Rock Recording of the Year, Video of the Year ("People of the Sky")
- 1997: Won – Alternative Recording of the Year, Group of the Year
  - Nominated – Pop Rock Recording of the Year
- 1998: Nominated – Single of the Year ("Everything You've Done Wrong"), Video of the Year ("Everything You've Done Wrong")
- 1999: Nominated – Group of the Year, Video of the Year ("Money City Maniacs")
- 2001: Nominated – Group of the Year
- 2002: Won – Video of the Year ("If It Feels Good Do It")
  - Nominated – Album of the Year (Pretty Together), Entertainer of the Year, Group of the Year, Rock Recording of the Year, Songwriter of the Year ("If It Feels Good Do It")
- 2003: Nominated – Entertainer of the Year, Single of the Year ("The Other Man"), Video of the Year ("The Other Man")
- 2004: Won – Video of the Year ("The Rest of My Life")
  - Nominated – Album of the Year (Action Pact), Group of the Year, Rock Recording of the Year (Action Pact), Single of the Year ("The Rest of My Life"), Songwriter of the Year ("The Rest of My Life")
- 2006 Nominated – Single of the Year ("All Used Up")
- 2007 Won – Rock Recording of the Year (Never Hear the End of It)
  - Nominated: Album of the Year (Never Hear the End of It), Group of the Year

== See also ==
- Canadian rock
- Music of Canada
