= Chris Murphy (Canadian musician) =

Canadian musician (born 1968)

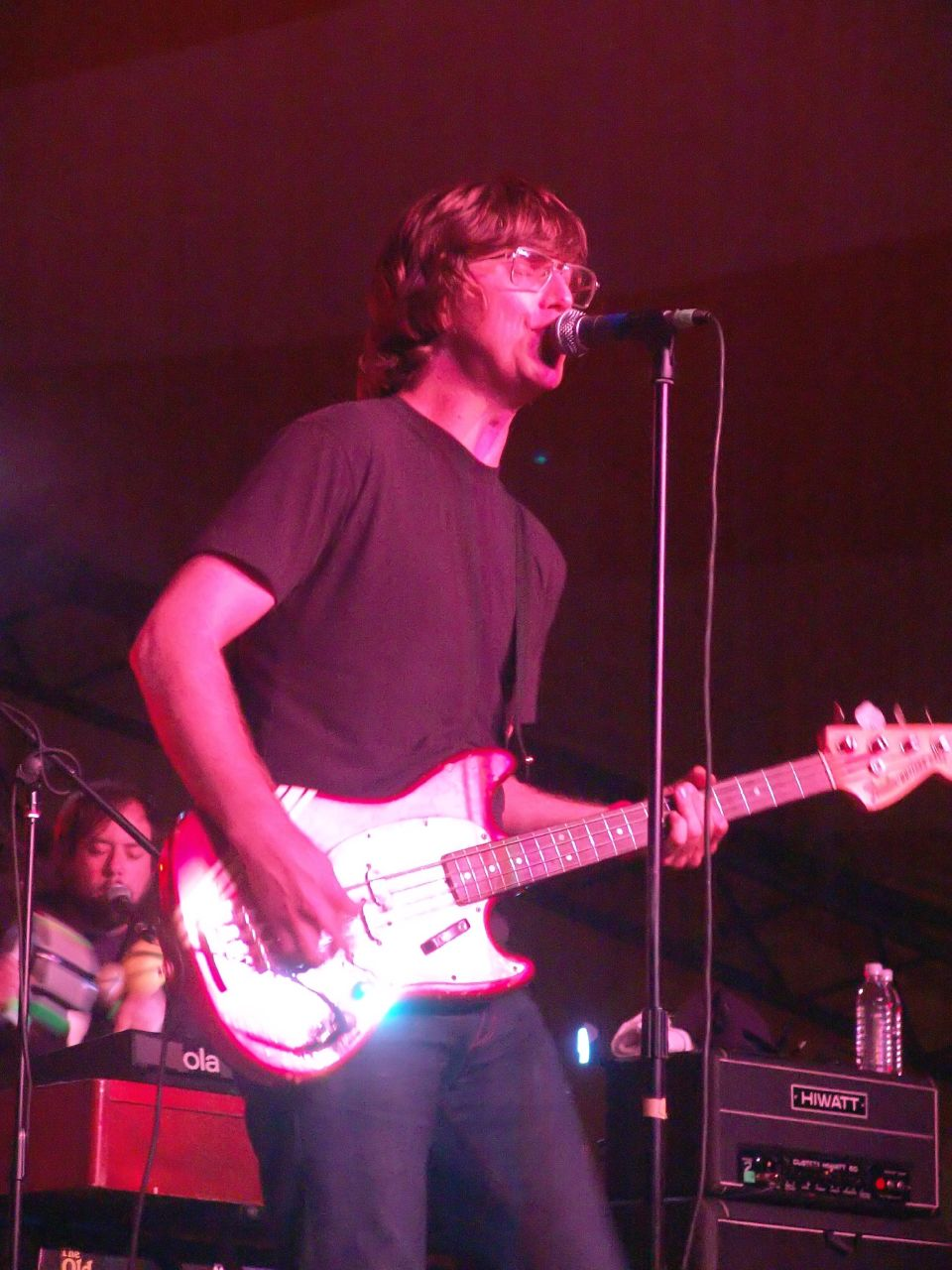
- Murphy performing with Sloan in 2007

Background information
- Born: November 7, 1968 (age 57); Charlottetown, Prince Edward Island, Canada
- Origin: Halifax, Nova Scotia, Canada
- Genres: Indie
- Occupation: Musician
- Instruments: Bass, drums, guitar, piano, vocals
- Years active: 1991–present
- Member of: Sloan, Tuns, Trans-Canada Highwaymen, Anyway Gang
- Formerly of: The Super Friendz, The Certain Someones

Christopher Michael Murphy (born November 7, 1968) is a Canadian musician and a member of the rock band Sloan.

== Early life ==
Murphy was born in Charlottetown, Prince Edward Island. His family moved to Charlottesville, Virginia, where his father obtained a Ph.D. from the University of Virginia. In 1978 they moved to Halifax, Nova Scotia, where he attended Halifax West High School and the Nova Scotia College of Art and Design.

== Musical career ==
Murphy originally formed Sloan with Jay Ferguson. Murphy is the band's primary bassist, occasionally switching to drums or guitar, and is one of the band's two main singers; he sings lead on about 40 percent of the band's songs and backup harmony vocals on most of the others.

Murphy has written several Sloan songs that have been released as singles, including "Underwhelmed" (from the album Smeared), "Coax Me" (from Twice Removed), "G Turns to D" (from One Chord to Another), "She Says What She Means" (from Navy Blues), "The Other Man" (from Pretty Together), and "The Rest of My Life" (from Action Pact).

In 1995, while Sloan was on a hiatus, Murphy toured and recorded as the drummer for The Super Friendz.

Murphy hosted a show on CBC Radio 3 with Sloan bandmate Jay Ferguson from December 2005 through November 2006. The show was also broadcast on Sirius Satellite Radio channel 94.

In 2010, Murphy served as a music performance supervisor for the film Scott Pilgrim vs. The World, tasked with making sure the actors knew how to play their own instruments for the camera. One character, Young Neil, is seen wearing a Sloan t-shirt during one scene; another character, Todd Ingram, plays a red Fender Mustang Bass with white racing stripe, similar to Murphy's.

In 2013, Murderecords released a 7-inch single by The Certain Someones, a supergroup featuring Chris Murphy, Matt Murphy of The Super Friendz, and Jale's Jennifer Pierce.

In 2015, Murphy formed the supergroup Tuns with Matt Murphy and Mike O'Neill of The Inbreds.

In 2016, Murphy, along with Steven Page (Barenaked Ladies), Moe Berg (The Pursuit of Happiness), and Craig Northey (Odds), formed the group Trans-Canada Highwaymen; they performed their first show in Niagara in July that year, and toured across Canada in 2017. Their live set consisted of cover songs by member's bands (Sloan, Odds, Pursuit of Happiness, Barenaked Ladies).

In 2018, Murphy and his bandmates from Sloan set out on a 30-date tour in support of their twelfth album together.

In August 2019, it was announced that Murphy had formed a supergroup called Anyway Gang with Sam Roberts and members of Hollerado and Tokyo Police Club.

Murphy and Joel Plaskett collaborated on the production of Prize for Writing, a posthumous album by singer-songwriter Matthew Grimson, which was recorded in 1995 but not commercially released until 2020.

== Personal life ==
Murphy and his girlfriend, Rebecca Mendoza, have two sons, Francisco and Santiago. Francisco is a drummer in the band "Borealia".

In July 2009, Murphy was hit by a car in a hit and run collision while riding his bicycle in Toronto, breaking his collarbone. The incident lent its name to Sloan's subsequent release, the Hit & Run EP.

On January 27, 2021, Murphy announced on Instagram that he was diagnosed with Bell's palsy earlier that month. He was optimistic that he would fully recover in the months ahead.
