= Patrick Pentland =

Canadian musician

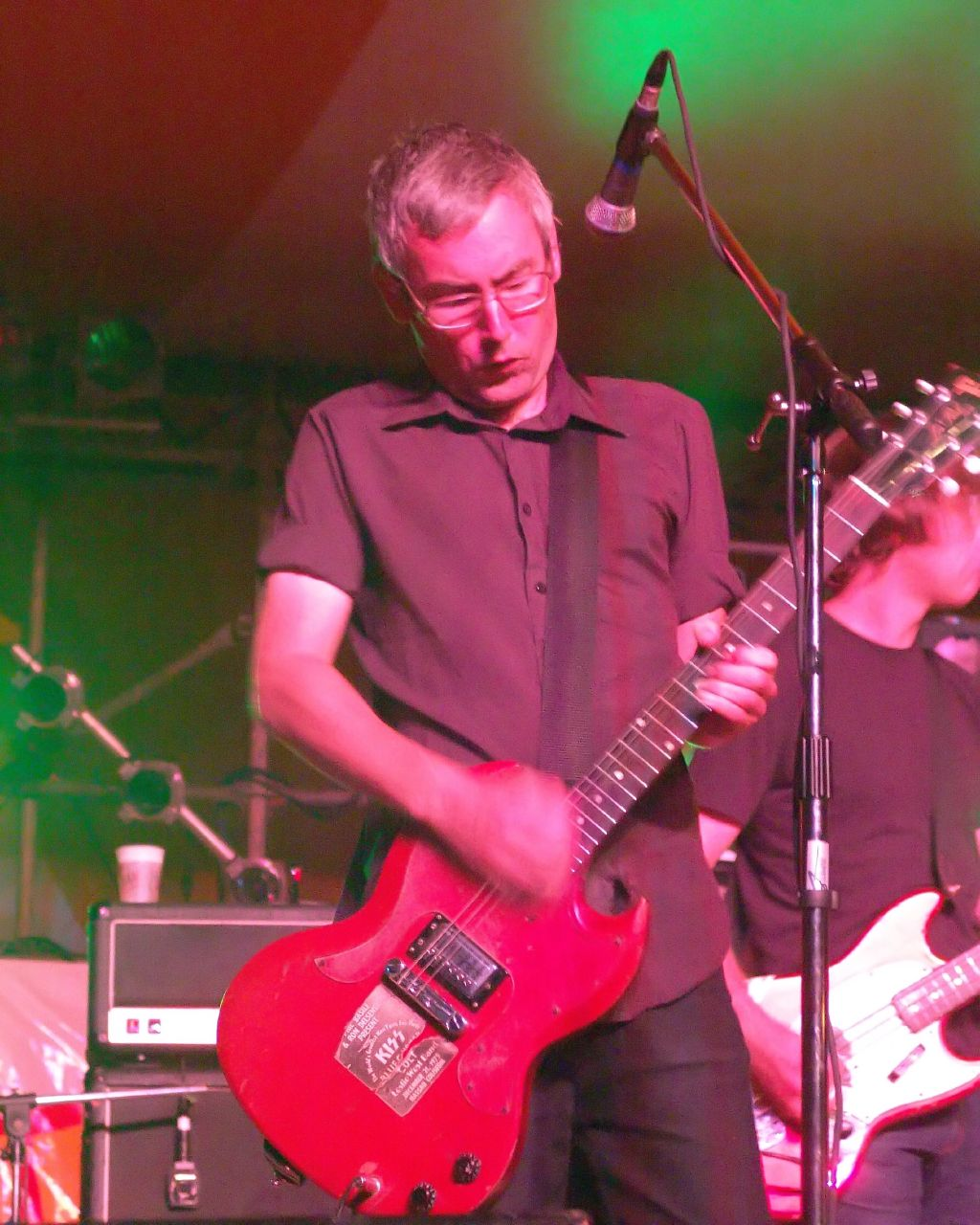
- Patrick Pentland performing with Sloan at the Sudbury Summerfest 2007 in Sudbury, Ontario

Background information
- Born: John Patrick Thomas Pentland; 20 September 1969 (age 56); Newtownards, Northern Ireland, UK
- Origin: Halifax, Nova Scotia, Canada
- Genres: Indie rock
- Occupation: Musician
- Instruments: Guitar, bass, keyboards, drums, vocals
- Years active: 1986–present
- Label: Murderecords
- Member of: Sloan; ALT CTRL
- Spinoffs: Prosecutor, Ripping Convulsions, Toxic Waste, Sloan, Destroy Tomorrow 666
- Website: www.sloanmusic.com

John Patrick Thomas Pentland (born 20 September 1969) is an Irish-born rock guitarist and a member of the Canadian rock band Sloan. All four members of Sloan write, produce, and sing their own songs, but Pentland primarily plays lead guitar for most songs. He occasionally plays rhythm guitar, bass, keyboards in the studio, and occasionally plays drums live. Pentland is one of the band's two main singers, as he sings lead on at least a third of the band's songs, including many of their singles on their third to fifth albums, plus back-up/harmony vocals on most of their other songs.

== Musical career ==
In high school, Pentland became serious about playing music, guitar in particular. His father had played in show bands in Northern Ireland throughout the 1960s and early 1970s. This influenced Pentland to follow in his father's footsteps. He had learned recorder in grade school, and played saxophone in his junior high school band, but he eventually settled on guitar as his main instrument.

Pentland's first group was a hard rock band, Prosecutor, which came together in the fall of 1984. They covered Iron Maiden and Judas Priest, plus a few originals influenced by those bands. The intended band name was actually Persecutor. Prosecutor played two shows, both in the spring of 1985—one in the local recreation centre that they rehearsed in, and the second on the lawn outside a local music store. By this time, however, Pentland had moved away from the hard rock sound of the band, becoming more interested in harder metal, having discovered bands like Motorhead, Venom, and the first two Metallica records.

Through this music, he became exposed to punk rock, especially American hardcore. Several trips back to Northern Ireland had also exposed him to The Sex Pistols and post-punk bands like The Cure, early Cult, and The Jesus and Mary Chain. By 1986, Pentland had formed a hardcore band with Cliff Gibb (later of Weasel Faced Judge, Thrush Hermit, Cool Blue Halo, Doug Mason), John Johnson (later of The Donner Party Reunion), and Scott Hiltz, called The Ripping Convulsions. The name was shortened to the Convulsions by their first gigs—several house parties in the suburbs of Halifax. The group recorded two tapes featuring songs written primarily by Pentland and Johnson, and performed a handful of shows in the Halifax punk scene, before disbanding in the summer of 1987. Pentland, Gibb, and Johnson formed a noisecore outfit in the fall of 1987, recording one song under the name Toxic Waste.

Reflecting their growing interest in American alternative guitar bands such as Sonic Youth, Dinosaur Jr., and Pixies, Pentland and Gibb formed Happy Co. with Melanie Rusinak (later of Tag (JALE), Chaz Rules, Cool Blue Halo, Black Pool) in late 1987. Rusinak's father had taught Pentland saxophone in junior high school. Happy Co. marked the first time that Pentland took on lead vocals, as well as becoming the main songwriter. Again, Happy Co. played a handful of gigs in the Halifax scene, which by then included Kearney Lake Road, composed of future Sloan members Chris Murphy and Jay Ferguson. Happy Co. continued on into 1990, adding Brad Baxter (formerly of Dread Scott, which included Ben Ross—who would go on to replace Gibb in Thrush Hermit) on second guitar, but eventually ended when the members decided to devote more time to finishing their various post-secondary pursuits.

In January 1991, Pentland was approached by Chris Murphy to join a new band he had started with Jay Ferguson called Sloan. The new band, rounded out by drummer Andrew Scott, quickly compiled a setlist of original songs, and played their first show at the Nova Scotia College of Art and Design, two weeks after Pentland joined.

Pentland has written for several music publications and dabbled in blogging, with revealing entries about the band's performances and tours. He has also contributed a song to the children's show Role Play, and performed music for several television commercials.

In 2005, Pentland began releasing electronic/ambient music online under the name Destroy Tomorrow 666. He has been a resident DJ in several prominent Toronto clubs. He said that he was asked to join the Doughboys (Canadian band) in the mid-1990's, but passed on the opportunity.

== Personal life ==
Pentland was born in Newtownards, Northern Ireland. He emigrated to Lower Sackville, Nova Scotia in 1975 with his father (Richard), mother (Patricia) and sister (Danielle). In 1977, Pentland's father's work saw them moving to Montego Bay, Jamaica, for eighteen months. Returning to Nova Scotia in 1979, they settled in Middle Sackville (outside Halifax), where Pentland remained until he moved out of the family home in 1991.

Pentland attended Sackville High and Millwood High. After graduating, he attended The University of King's College, entering the school's journalism program. Pentland left the program in his second year, and eventually graduated with a BA in history, of which he claims to have retained very little knowledge.

Pentland lives in Toronto. He has three children.
