= 1970 Cannes Film Festival =

- Official poster of the 23rd Cannes Film Festival, an original illustration by French artist René Ferracci.
- Opening film: The Things of Life
- Closing film: Le Bal du Comte d'Orgel
- Location: Cannes, France
- Founded: 1946
- Awards: Grand Prix: M*A*S*H
- No. of films: 25 (In Competition)
- Festival date: 2 May 1970 – 16 May 1970
- Website: festival-cannes.com/en

Cannes Film Festival
- 1971 1969

The 23rd Cannes Film Festival took place from 3 to 18 May 1970. Guatemalan author and Nobel Prize laureate Miguel Ángel Asturias served as jury president for the main competition.

The Grand Prix du Festival International du Film, then the festival's main prize, was awarded to M*A*S*H by Robert Altman.

In this edition, Robert Favre LeBret, the founder of the festival, decided not to include any films from Russia and Japan (their flags were also omitted on the Croisette). He was supposedly tired of the "Slavic spectacles and Japanese samurai flicks.". The Russians took back their juror Sergei Obraztsov (head of Moscow puppet theater) and left the jury panel with only eight members.

The festival opened with The Things of Life by Claude Sautet and closed with Le Bal du Comte d'Orgel by Marc Allégret.

== Juries ==
=== Main Competition ===
- Miguel Ángel Asturias, Guatemalan author, diplomat and Nobel Prize laureate - Jury President
- Guglielmo Biraghi, Italian film critic
- Kirk Douglas, American actor
- Christine Gouze-Rénal, French producer
- Vojtěch Jasný, Czechoslovak filmmaker
- Félicien Marceau, French playwright
- Sergey Obraztsov, Soviet puppeteer
- Karel Reisz, British filmmaker
- Volker Schlöndorff, West-German filmmaker

=== Short Films Competition ===
- Fred Orain, producer
- Jerzy Płażewski, Polish film critic
- Vincio Delleani, Italian

== Official selection ==
=== In Competition ===
The following feature films competed for the Grand Prix du Festival International du Film:

English title	Original title	Director(s)	Production country
The Alienist	O Alienista	Nelson Pereira dos Santos	Brazil
The Buttercup Chain		Robert Ellis Miller	United Kingdom
Don Segundo Sombra		Manuel Antín	Argentina
The Dreamer	התמהוני	Dan Wolman	Israel
Elise, or Real Life	Élise ou la vraie vie	Michel Drach	France
The Falcons	Magasiskola	István Gaál	Hungary
Fruit of Paradise	Ovoce stromu rajských jíme	Věra Chytilová	Czechoslovakia
Harry Munter		Kjell Grede	Sweden
Hoa-Binh	Hòa Bình	Raoul Coutard	France, South Vietnam
Investigation of a Citizen Above Suspicion	Indagine su un cittadino al di sopra di ogni sospetto	Elio Petri	Italy
The Land	الأرض	Youssef Chahine	Egypt
Landscape After the Battle	Krajobraz po bitwie	Andrzej Wajda	Poland
Last Leap	Le dernier saut	Édouard Luntz	France
Leo the Last		John Boorman	United Kingdom
Long Live the Bride and Groom	¡Vivan los novios!	Luis García Berlanga	Spain
Malatesta		Peter Lilienthal	West Germany
M*A*S*H		Robert Altman	United States
Metello		Mauro Bolognini	Italy
The Palace of Angels	O Palácio dos Anjos	Walter Hugo Khouri	Brazil, France
The Pizza Triangle	Dramma della gelosia (tutti i particolari in cronaca)	Ettore Scola	Italy, Spain
A Simple Story	Une si simple histoire	Abdellatif Ben Ammar	Tunisia
The Strawberry Statement		Stuart Hagmann	United States
Tell Me That You Love Me, Junie Moon		Otto Preminger	United States
The Things of Life (opening film)	Les Choses de la vie	Claude Sautet	France, Italy, Switzerland
Tulips of Haarlem	I tulipani di Haarlem	Franco Brusati	Italy

=== Out of Competition ===
The following films were selected to be screened out of competition:

English Title	Original Title	Director(s)	Production Country
The Ball of Count Orgel (closing film)	Le Bal du comte d'Orgel	Marc Allégret	France
Mictlan o la casa de los que ya no son		Raúl Kamffer	Mexico
The Territory of Others	Le territoire des autres	Gérard Vienne, Jacqueline Lecompte, Michel Fano, François Bel	France
They Shoot Horses, Don't They?		Sydney Pollack	United States
Tristana		Luis Buñuel	Spain, France, Italy
The Virgin and the Gypsy		Christopher Miles	United Kingdom
Voyage Chez Les Vivants		Henry Brandt	Switzerland
Woodstock		Michael Wadleigh	United States

=== Short Films Competition ===
The following short films competed for the Prix du Jury:

English Title	Original Title	Director(s)	Production Country
A Day With the Boys	Ein Tag mit den Jungen	Volker Schlöndorff	West Germany
Comme Larrons En Foire		Edmond Freess	France
The Devil Without a Lady	El diablo sin dama	Eduardo Calcagno	Argentina
Et Salammbo?		Jean-Pierre Richard	Tunisia
Gipsy Pentecost (The Feast of St. Sara)		Laurence Boulting	United Kingdom
Kaleidoski		Jacques Ertaud	France
The Other Silence	L'autre silence	Nestor Matsas	Greece
Light	Lumière	Paul Cohen	United States
The Magic Machines		Bob Curtis	United States
The Deadly Smell	Smrtící vůně	Václav Bedřich	Czechoslovakia
The Epitaph		Gurucharan Singh	India
A Time for Memory	Un temps pour la mémoire	Georges Pessis	France

== Parallel sections ==
=== International Critics' Week ===
The following films were screened for the 9th International Critics' Week (9e Semaine de la Critique):

English Title	Original Title	Director(s)	Production Country
Camarades		Marin Karmitz	France
Éloge du chiac		Michel Brault	Canada
Kes		Ken Loach	United Kingdom
Mistreatment	Misshandlingen	Lars Lennart Forsberg	Sweden
The Siege	O Cerco	António da Cunha Telles	Portugal
We Can See It's Not You	On voit bien que c’est pas toi	Christian Zarifian	France
Ramparts of Clay	Remparts d’argile	Jean-Louis Bertucelli	France, Algeria
The River Schooners	Les Voitures d’eau	Pierre Perrault	Canada
Oh, Sun	Soleil Ô	Med Hondo	Mauritania, France
The Crows	Vrane	Gordan Mihić, Ljubiša Kozomara	Yugoslavia
Warm in the Bud		Rudolph Caringi	United States
Ice		Robert Kramer	United States

=== Directors' Fortnight ===
The following films were screened for the 1970 Directors' Fortnight (Quinzaine des Réalizateurs):

- A nous deux, France by Désiré Ecaré (Ivory Coast, France)
- The Age of the Fish by Roland Gall (West Germany)
- L'Araignée d'eau by Jean-Daniel Verhaeghe (France)
- Arthur Penn: Themes, Variants, Images & Words [doc.) by Robert Hughes (United States)
- Bhuvan Shome by Mrinal Sen (India)
- Caliche sangriento by Helvio Soto (Chile)
- The Year of the Cannibals by Liliana Cavani (Italy)
- Cowards by Simon Nuchtern (United States)
- Des Christs par milliers by Philippe Arthuys (France)
- Détruisez-vous by Serge Bard (France)
- Don Giovanni by Carmelo Bene (Italy)
- Eika Katappa by Werner Schroeter (West Germany)
- End Of The Road by Aram Avakian (United States)
- Entre tu et vous by Michel Brault and Gilles Groulx (Canada)
- L'Escadron Volapük by René Gilson (France)
- L'Étrangleur by Paul Vecchiali (France)
- Even Dwarfs Started Small (Auch Zwerge haben klein angefangen) by Werner Herzog (West Germany)
- Un Film by Sylvina Boissonnas (France)
- Fuoricampo by Peter Del Monte (Italy)
- Give God a Chance on Sunday (Dieu existe tous les dimanches) by Henrik Stangerup (Denmark)
- Handcuffs (Lisice) by Krsto Papić (Yugoslavia)
- La Hora de los niños by Arturo Ripstein (Mexico)
- The House of Light (La Chambre Blanche) by Jean Pierre Lefebvre (Canada)
- The Howl (L'urlo) by Tinto Brass (Italy)
- The Heirs (Os Herdeiros) by Carlos Diegues (Brazil)
- James ou pas by Michel Soutter (Switzerland)
- Jänken by Lars Forsberg (Sweden)
- Jutrzenka by Jaime Camino (Spain)
- Killed the Family and Went to the Movies (Matou a Família e Foi ao Cinema) by Júlio Bressane (Brazil)
- Macunaíma by Joaquim Pedro de Andrade (Brazil)
- A Married Couple (doc.) by Allan King (Canada)
- Molo by Wojciech Solarz (Poland)
- My Friend Pierrette (Mon amie Pierrette) by Jean Pierre Lefebvre (Canada)
- L'Odyssée du général José by Jorge Fraga (Cuba)
- L'Opium et le Bâton by Ahmed Rachedi (Algeria)
- Palaver by Emile Degelin (Belgium)
- Paradise Now (doc.) by Sheldon Rochlin (United Kingdom)
- Portrait by Jérôme Hill (United States)
- Une Pulsation by Carlos Paez Vilaro and Gérard Levy-Clerc (France, Uruguay)
- Putney Swope by Robert Downey Sr. (United States)
- Q-Bec My Love by Jean Pierre Lefebvre (Canada)
- Reason Over Passion by Joyce Wieland (Canada)
- Reconstituirea by Lucian Pintilie (Romania)
- Le Révélateur by Philippe Garrel (France)
- Right On by Herbert Danska (United States)
- Ruchome piaski by Władysław Ślesicki (Poland)
- School Play by Charles Rydell (United States)
- Som Natt Och Dag by Jonas Cornell (Sweden)
- Struktura kryształu by Krzysztof Zanussi (Poland)
- Sweet Hunters (Ternos caçadores) by Ruy Guerra (Panama)
- Troupe d'élite, fleur de Marie by Oimel Mai (West Germany)
- Valparaíso, mi amor by Aldo Francia (Chile)
- Wind from the East (Le Vent d'est) by Jean-Luc Godard (Italy)
- Les Yeux ne veulent pas en tout temps se fermer by Jean-Marie Straub and Danièle Huillet (West Germany)

Short films

- 20 September by Kurt Kren (France)
- Aaa by Dieter Meier (France)
- Ai Love by Takahiko Limura (France)
- All My Life by Bruce Baillie (United States)
- American Woman by Bruce E. Meintjies (United States)
- Back And Forth by Michael Snow (United States)
- Bartleby 1970 by Jean-Pierre Bastid (France)
- Béjart by Atahualpa Lichy (France, Venezuela)
- Berkeley by Patrick Reynolds (United States)
- Bliss by Gregory Markopoulos (France)
- Cosinus Alpha by Kurt Kren (France)
- Das Sonnenbad by Bernd Upnmoor (West Germany)
- David Perry by Albie Thoms (Australia)
- Dimanche Après-midi by Stéphane Kurc (France)
- Disson. Zeitreih by Hans Peter Kochenrath (France)
- Eros, O Basil by Gregory Markopoulos (France)
- Faces by John Moore and Takahiko Limura (France)
- Fenstergucker by Kurt Kren (France)
- Film Oder Macht by Vlado Kristl (France)
- Georges Albert, Aventurier by Daniel Edinger (France)
- In The Void by Ronald Bijlsma (Netherlands)
- It's So Peaceful by Fritz André Kracht (France)
- La Bergère En Colère by Francis Warin (France)
- La Cazadora Inconsciente by Rafael R. Balerdi (Spain)
- La Question ordinaire by Claude Miller (France)
- La Tête Froide by Patrick Hella (Belgium)
- Labyrinthe by Piotr Kamler (France)
- Le Coo by Paul Dopff (France)
- Le Voyage De M. Guitton by Pascal Aubier (France)
- Les Trois Cousins by René Vautier (France)
- Manha Cinzenta by Olney A. Sau Paulo (Brazil)
- Mauern by Kurt Kren (France)
- Messages, Messages by Steven Arnold (United States)
- One More Time by Daniel Pommereulle (France)
- Papa und Mama by Kurt Kren (France)
- Park Rape by Jon Beckjord (United States)
- Piece Mandala by Paul Sharits (France)
- Play 4 + 5 by Klaus Schönherr (France)
- Portrait D. Cor by Klaus Schönherr (France)
- Portraits by Gregory Markopoulos (France)
- S.W.B. by Gérard Pires (France)
- Scenes From by Stan Brakhage (France)
- Selbst Verst by Selbst Verst (France)
- Sodoma by Otto Muehl (France)
- Some Won't Go by Gil Toff (United States)
- Still Nacht by Hans Peter Kochenrath (France)
- Stock Exchange Transplant by Douglas Collins (United States)
- T,O,U,C,H,I,N,G by Paul Sharits (France)
- Talla by Malcolm Le Grice (France)
- The Mechanical Man by Ronald Fritz (United States)
- Underground Explosion by Kurt Kren (France)
- Vite by Daniel Pommereulle (France)
- Work In Progress by W. Hein and G. Hein (France)
- Zelenka by Robert Rosen (United States)

== Official Awards ==
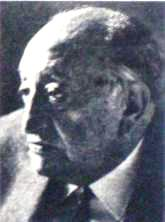
Miguel Ángel Asturias, Jury President

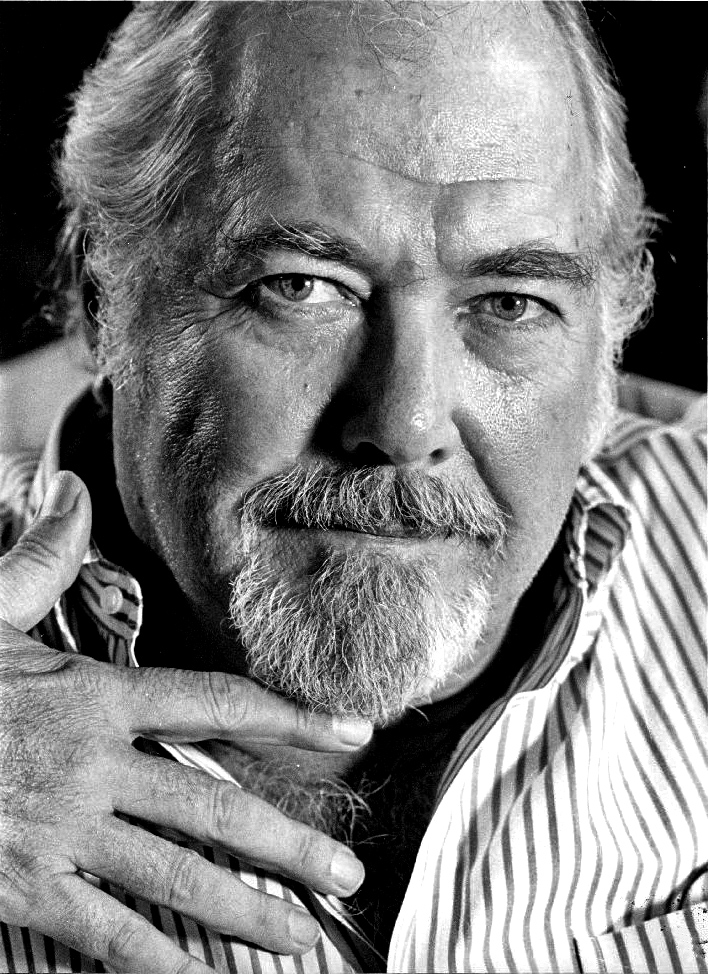
Robert Altman, Palme d'Or winner

=== Main Competition ===
- Grand Prix du Festival International du Film: M*A*S*H by Robert Altman
- Grand Prix Spécial du Jury: Investigation of a Citizen Above Suspicion by Elio Petri
- Best Director: John Boorman for Leo the Last
- Best Actress: Ottavia Piccolo for Metello
- Best Actor: Marcello Mastroianni for The Pizza Triangle
- Jury Prize:
  - The Falcons by István Gaál
  - The Strawberry Statement by Stuart Hagmann
- Best First Work: Hoa-Binh by Raoul Coutard

=== Short Films Competition ===
- Prix du Jury: The Magic Machines by Bob Curtis
  - Special Mention: Et Salammbo? by Jean-Pierre Richard

== Independent Awards ==
=== FIPRESCI Prize ===
- Investigation of a Citizen Above Suspicion by Elio Petri

=== Commission Supérieure Technique ===
- Technical Grand Prize: Le Territoire des autres by François Bel

== Media ==
- INA: Opening of the 1970 Cannes Festival (commentary in French)
