= Herbert A. Deane =

Herbert Andrew Deane (1921 – February 14, 1991) was an American political scientist. He served in a number of administrative positions at Columbia University, including vice provost. He was the recipient of a Guggenheim Fellowship in 1960.

== Biography ==
Deane was a native of Brooklyn, and graduated from Columbia College in 1942 as valedictorian of his class. He then served in the United States Navy for four years during World War II, before returning to Columbia and earned his Ph.D. in political science in 1953.

He joined the Columbia faculty in 1948 and became a full professor in 1961. From 1963 to 1967, Deane was vice dean of Columbia's graduate faculties and became vice provost of the university in 1968. He was credited for inspiring the title of James Simon Kunen's 1969 book The Strawberry Statement for his remarks during the Columbia University protests of 1968. As a political philosopher, Deane was known for his writings on Augustine of Hippo and Harold Laski.

Deane retired from academia in 1984, and died on February 14, 1991.

Among his students were Karl Dean, former Mayor of Nashville.
