= Business International Corporation =

American publishing and advisory firm

Business International Corporation (BI) was a publishing and advisory firm dedicated to assisting American companies in operating abroad. It was founded in 1953. It organized conferences, and worked with major corporations. Former president Barack Obama worked there as a financial researcher after graduating from Columbia University. In 1986, Business International was acquired by the Economist Group in London, and it eventually merged with the Economist Intelligence Unit. Business International was linked to the Central Intelligence Agency.

== History ==
Founded in 1953 by Eldridge Haynes and his son, Elliott Haynes, BI initially focused on American companies and started out with a weekly newsletter (called Business International) and a group of key corporate clients. Offices were established overseas, including major regional operations based out of Geneva (Europe), Vienna (East Europe and the USSR) and Hong Kong (Asia-Pacific), and single-country offices (e.g., Rome, Tokyo).

Orville L. Freeman, US Secretary of Agriculture for Presidents John F. Kennedy and Lyndon B. Johnson, was President and CEO of Business International from 1970 to 1985.

BI eventually became the premier information source on global business with research, advisory functions, conferences and government roundtables in addition to its publications. It was headquartered in New York City, at One Dag Hammarskjold Plaza, near the UN, with major offices in Geneva, London, Vienna, Hong Kong and Tokyo, and a network of correspondents across the globe.

In his book The Strawberry Statement, former student protester James Kunen reports a description of Business International by an unnamed Students for a Democratic Society conference attendee in 1968. The attendee, referred to by Kunen as 'the kid', claimed the company offered to finance SDS demonstrations in Chicago. Business International is described as 'the left wing of the ruling class' and as desiring a Gene McCarthy presidency.

== Publishing ==
Publications included a family of newsletters (Business International, Business Europe, Business Eastern Europe, Business Latin America, Business Asia, Business China, and Business International Money Report), put out on a weekly, bi-weekly or monthly basis. Among the regularly updated reference products covering 40-50 countries were Financing Foreign Operations (FFO), Investment, Licensing and Trading Conditions Abroad (ILT) and China Hand). An international business, politics and economic forecasting service (Business International Forecasting Service, BIFS) evolved from an annual five-year outlook to quarterly and in some cases even more frequent reports. More specialized work covered economic and political risk assessment, and executive cost of living in various cities around the world.

In addition, Business International published book-length reports on a variety of topics, including such titles as Organizing for International Operations, 30 Business Checklists, India: Limited Avenues to an Unlimited Market, and Structuring & Locating your Asian Headquarters.

== Research and consulting ==
BI also conducted specialized research assignments for its clients, some of which involved hands-on consulting, brainstorming and briefings during strategic planning sessions. Although country analysts might be pulled into region-wide or country specific work, the company also had a dedicated team in the Research and Consulting (later, Consulting and Research) division.

== Conferences ==
BI was perhaps best known outside the United States for its Roundtable Conferences. Begun in the 1950s with topics usually focused on single countries and their governments (e.g., Roundtable with the Government of Mexico), the series evolved in the 1970s to include region-wide, multi-day conferences such as the Heads of Asia Pacific Operations (HAPO) and Heads of Latin American Operations (HELAO) roundtables. The national roundtables, attended by client firms' top international managers, always included the country's head of state or government, as well as relevant ministers, local business and labor leaders.

A second conference product focused on specific industries, including telecoms and automotive, or on functional operations such as finance or human resources.

More frequent gatherings of clients based in a single city were marketed under the "Country Managers," "Regional General Managers" or "Peer Group Forum" brands. Several competing companies focusing on these services were established by former employees, particularly in Asia.

== Clientele ==
The company's client base included most major American companies, as well as European, Japanese and Indian companies and corporate groups. International corporations, private and public institutions, were typically provided a package of publications and services which included attendance at special roundtables that provided political, economic and currency forecasts and a certain amount of research/consulting hours. The package could also include participation at government roundtables held in a local host country that served as fora for discussions between the international private sector and the local governments. For these packages or "programs" as they were called members paid a periodic service fee.

== Barack Obama ==
In the late summer of 1983, future United States President Barack Obama interviewed for a job at Business International Corporation. He worked there for "little more than year." As a research associate in its financial services division, he edited Financing Foreign Operations, a global reference service, and wrote for Business International Money Report, a weekly financial newsletter. His responsibilities included "interviewing business experts, researching trends in foreign exchange, following market developments. . . . He wrote about currency swaps and leverage leases. . . . Obama also helped write financial reports on Mexico and Brazil".

Barack Obama was, in part, responsible for the publication of a special BI report advising clients on how to conduct financial management in the hyperinflationary and Byzantine financial regulatory period in Brazil in the early 1980s. The report was entitled Financial Action Report: Survival Financial Management in Brazil. The report, published in 1984, discussed such issues as "Choosing Cruzeiro or Dollar Financing", "the Inter-Company Market: Alternative to Bank Financing", "The Effectiveness of Government Hedging Instruments", "Leading and Lagging International Trade Payments", "Blocked Funds" among many other treasury and cash management topics.

The preface of the report states "Barack Obama, assistant manager, conducted the interviews and wrote up the results" in the report.

== CIA ==
A 1977 New York Times article mentioned Business International as one of the lesser known of 22 news organizations found to have employed journalists who were also working for the Central Intelligence Agency (CIA). (Note: In all, the three-month investigation by the Times found that at least 22 American news organizations had employed, though sometimes only on a casual basis, American journalists who were also working for the C.I.A. In a few instances, the organizations were aware of the C.I.A. connection, but most of them appear not to have been. The organizations, which ranged from some of the most influential in the nation to some of the most obscure, include ABC and CBS News, Time, Life, and Newsweek magazines, The New York Times, the New York Herald Tribune, the Associated Press and United Press International. Also included were the Scripps-Howard chain of newspapers, The Christian Science Monitor, The Wall Street Journal, the Louisville Courier-Journal, and Fodor's, a publisher of travel guides. Among the lesser known organizations were the College Press Service, Business International, the McLendon Broadcasting Organization, The Film Daily, and a defunct underground newspaper published in Washington, the Quicksilver Times.) Elliott Haynes "said his father, Eldridge Haynes, had provided cover for four C.I.A. employees in various countries between 1955 and 1960."
