= Columbia University protests =

Columbia University in New York City has been the scene of student activism since its inception. The term Columbia University protests may refer to:

- 1968 Columbia University protests
- Columbia University pro-Palestinian campus protests during the Gaza war
  - Gaza Solidarity Encampment (Columbia University)
