= Believe in Me =

Believe in Me may refer to:

== Film ==
- Believe in Me (1971 film), an American romantic drama directed by Stuart Hagmann
- Believe in Me (2006 film), an American drama directed by Robert Collector

== Music ==
=== Albums ===
- Believe in Me (Duff McKagan album) or the title song, 1993
- Believe in Me (Regina Belle album) or the title song, 1998
- Believe in Me, an EP by Jeff Scott Soto, 2006

=== Songs ===
- "Believe in Me" (ATB song), 2005
- "Believe in Me" (Bonnie Tyler song), 2013
- "Believe in Me" (Dan Fogelberg song), 1984
- "Believe in Me" (Lenny Kravitz song), 2002
- "Believe in Me" (Michelle Williams song), 2015
- "Believe in Me" (The Pierces song), 2014
- "Believe in Me" (Sloan song), 2008
- "Believe in Me", by Boyzone from Said and Done, 1995
- "Believe in Me", by Demi Lovato from Don't Forget, 2008
- "Believe in Me", by David Rolfe, the opening theme for the fifth season of Pokémon, 2002
- "Believe in Me", by the J. Geils Band from Hotline, 1975
- "Believe in Me", by R. Kelly from Write Me Back, 2012
- "Believe in Me", by Rick Springfield from Comic Book Heroes, 1973
- "Believe in Me", by Utah Saints from Utah Saints, 1993
