= The Strawberry Statement (film) =

1970 film

- Directed by: Stuart Hagmann
- Written by: Israel Horovitz
- Based on: The Strawberry Statement by James S. Kunen
- Produced by: Robert Chartoff; Irwin Winkler
- Starring: Bruce Davison; Kim Darby; Bud Cort; Andrew Parks; Kristin Van Buren; Kristina Holland; Bob Balaban
- Cinematography: Ralph Woolsey
- Edited by: Marje Fowler; Roger J. Roth; Fredric Steinkamp
- Music by: Ian Freebairn-Smith
- Distributed by: Metro-Goldwyn-Mayer
- Release date: June 15, 1970
- Running time: 109 minutes
- Country: United States
- Language: English
- Budget: $1.5 million

The Strawberry Statement is a 1970 American comedy-drama directed by Stuart Hagmann, loosely based on the non-fiction account that James Kunen wrote about the 1968 Columbia University protests. Set against the backdrop of 1960s counterculture, the film follows Simon, an initially apathetic college student at a fictional San Francisco university, as he becomes involved in campus demonstrations opposing the construction of a segregated gymnasium.

Produced during a time of social upheaval, the film blends fictional storytelling with documentary-style elements, featuring a soundtrack emblematic of the era, including songs by Crosby, Stills, Nash & Young and Joni Mitchell. While it won the Jury Prize at the 1970 Cannes Film Festival, the film polarized critics and underperformed commercially, with many critiquing its stylized direction and commercial tone. Over time, however, it has gained retrospective recognition as a cultural artifact, offering a snapshot of the aspirations and contradictions of 1960s youth movements.

== Plot ==
The film follows the radicalization of Simon, a student at a fictional university in San Francisco. Initially indifferent to the student protests around him, Simon learns of plans to occupy a university building in opposition to the construction of an allegedly segregated gym against the wishes of the local minority community. His curiosity is piqued, and he makes his way to the protest. On the way, he spots a fellow student, Linda, and falls in love with her at first sight. He follows her into the protest, and they both join in. Later, when the strikers become hungry, they rob a local grocer together.

As their relationship develops, Simon confesses to Linda his lack of commitment, explaining that he worked hard to gain college admission in the first place. Linda responds that she cannot date someone who is not equally devoted to the movement. As a result, they part ways—for now.

Afterward, Simon is assaulted by a right-wing athlete, George, but uses his injuries to claim police brutality. Gaining attention among students, he is unexpectedly seduced by a young woman protester. Later, however, Linda returns, announcing her decision to stay with Simon. They spend an afternoon in the park, where they are accosted by a group of African Americans, one of whom destroys Simon's camera. Furious, Simon later expresses his disillusionment, telling protesters that those they seek to help seem no different from the violent cops. However, he reconsiders his stance after visiting George in the hospital. The same jock who had assaulted him now suffers from injuries inflicted by right-wingers as the police stood by and watched.

Leaving the hospital, Simon visits the dean's office and warns an administrative assistant to halt construction of the gymnasium or risk violence. Eventually, city police and the National Guard, armed with bayoneted rifles, arrive and crush the university building takeover with tear gas. As the strikers choke, police and guardsmen drag the demonstrators from the building, beating them with batons. As Linda is carried away, kicking and screaming, Simon launches a solo attack on a group of officers. In the film's final moments, flashes of his happier college days appear before the viewers' eyes.

== Cast ==
- Bruce Davison as Simon
- Kim Darby as Linda
- Bud Cort as Elliot (the coxswain)
- Murray MacLeod as George
- Tom Foral as The Coach
- Bob Balaban as Elliot (the protest organizer)
- Greta Pope as Song Leader
- Danny Goldman as Charlie
- Booker Bradshaw as Lucas
- James Coco as The Grocer

== Production ==
Clay Felker, editor of New York magazine, introduced producer Irwin Winkler to a column by James Kunen, predicting it would become a book (published in 1969). After reading it, Winkler and his producing partner, Bob Chartoff, acquired the film rights. "We thought it could create understanding—the schism was so great between the generations then," Winkler recalled. "It was an important subject. These youths, who are looked upon as anarchists, are really just American kids reacting to problems in our society. Here was a story about an ordinary guy becoming an anarchist."

Winkler, having seen The Indian Wants the Bronx and It's Called the Sugar Plum by Israel Horovitz, approached the playwright about adapting the book. Horovitz pitched the film to MGM, proposing it be shot at Columbia University. "At the time, there was a student group that had shot a lot of black and white documentary footage of the strikes at Columbia," he explained. "I wanted to intercut this documentary footage with the fiction that I planned to write."

The pitch was successful, and in May 1969, MGM announced plans to produce the film. At the time, MGM's president was "Bo" Polk, and Herb Solow served as head of production.

Horovitz was officially signed to write the screenplay, ultimately drafting ten versions over two years. François Truffaut was offered the director's role but declined. The project was eventually assigned to Stuart Hagmann, known for his work in television and advertising.

Horovitz faced challenges adapting the script when MGM suggested relocating the setting to the West Coast. He consulted Kunen for several days before questioning the film's core purpose: "Who is this movie really for? What's the point of it? If it’s just preaching to the already informed, then it will have no worth."

Reflecting on his approach, Horovitz later remarked, "I took the approach that Michael Moore must take with his documentaries. Moore doesn’t talk to people who are already in the know—he speaks to those who don’t. So I started heading in that direction with the script rewrite."

In his memoirs, Winkler noted that Hagmann's directorial style, characterized by extensive camera movement, meant "the actors sometimes suffered from the crew's allocation of production time versus acting time. But they were game and young, though they required a lot of on-set communication."

Horovitz later commented, "The scenario was cut by the director, not by MGM. It was diluted through the cuts—it should have been much stronger than it is. But then, it would have lost most of its audience right away."

Filming took place in multiple locations, including Stockton, California, San Francisco (notably Gorilla Records, Caffe Triest on Grant Avenue, Alamo Square, and the High School of Commerce), and the University of California, Berkeley. These locations are credited in the film's opening sequence.

Actress Kim Darby recalled, "The director was very kind. He was lenient. He was a lot of fun too. He had done many commercials before, and there was the air of freedom around us."

== Soundtrack ==
The Strawberry Statement - Music from the Original Soundtrack

Soundtrack album by Various
- Released: 1970
- Recorded: 1970
- Genres: Rock; Pop; Classical; Folk; World; Country; Stage & Screen
- Length: 53:00
- Label: MGM Records
- Producer: Jesse Kaye

The soundtrack of the film consists mainly of pop, rock, folk and classical music. Ian Freebairn-Smith composed original music for the film, which was performed by The MGM Studio Orchestra under his direction. The soundtrack album was released in 1970 by MGM Records as a double LP.

=== Track listing ===
Side A

1. Buffy Sainte-Marie "The Circle Game" (Mitchell) – 2:50
2. Crosby, Stills, Nash & Young "Our House" (Nash) – 2:59
3. Ian Freebairn-Smith and The MGM Studio Orch. "Market Basket (Theme From The Strawberry Statement)" (Freebairn-Smith) – 1:53
4. Neil Young "Down By The River" (Young) – 9:12

Side B

1. Crosby, Stills & Nash "Long Time Gone" (Crosby)– 4:17
2. Ian Freebairn-Smith and The MGM Studio Orch. "Cyclatron (Theme From The Strawberry Statement)" (Freebairn-Smith) – 3:16
3. Thunderclap Newman "Something In The Air" (Keen) – 3:54

Side C

1. Karl Bohm cond. The Berlin Philharmonic Orch. "Also Sprach Zarathustra (Thus Spake Zarathustra)" (Strauss) – 1:37
2. Neil Young "The Loner" (Young) – 3:55
3. Ian Freebairn-Smith and The MGM Studio Orch. "Coit Tower (Theme From The Strawberry Statement)" (Freebairn-Smith) – 3:21
4. The Red Mountain Jug Band "Fishin' Blues" (Trad.) – 1:53

Side D

1. Ian Freebairn-Smith and The MGM Studio Orch. "Concerto In D Minor" (Marcello) – 5:10
2. Crosby, Stills, Nash & Young "Helpless" (Young) – 3:30
3. Ian Freebairn-Smith and The MGM Studio Orch. "Pocket Band (Theme From The Strawberry Statement)" (Freebairn-Smith) – 3:01
4. The Cast "Give Peace a Chance" (Lennon–McCartney) – 1:40

=== Credits ===
- Coordinator [Album Coordinated By] – Jesse Kaye
- Liner Notes – Mike Curb

== Reception ==
Vincent Canby of The New York Times wrote that the film "only lacks an occasional, superimposed written message ... to look like a giant, 103-minute commercial, not for peace, or student activism, or community responsibility, but for the director himself."

Gene Siskel of the Chicago Tribune gave the film two-and-a-half stars out of four and called it "a movie with its heart, if not always its intelligence, in the right place ... The major problem with the film is that during the period before Simon James, a 20-year old student at Western Pacific university, is radicalized, neither his life style as a member of the college crew, nor the political movement on campus is very interesting. Director Stuart Hagman [sic], in his first feature effort, substitutes overly enthusiastic camera techniques and popular music played against the San Francisco scenery for a more complete character definition."

Charles Champlin of the Los Angeles Times wrote, "I found The Strawberry Statement inconsistent and uneven, all too glossy and yet suddenly all too real and populated with children I have no trouble recognizing as my own. And it's the true measure of the film that we are all likely to remember its best moments: The moments when we are made to see the terrible and ironic costs of innocence and idealism."

Gary Arnold of The Washington Post stated that the violent climax "would be absurd even if it were well staged, because Hagmann and Horowitz haven't earned their catharsis. There is something howlingly inappropriate about a movie that turns 'angry' after an hour-and-a-half of puppy love, puppy protest and the confectionery audio-visual style pioneered by A Man and a Woman and The Graduate. It's difficult to forget that the script has been fundamentally negligible and incompetent."

David Pirie of The Monthly Film Bulletin wrote, "The Strawberry Statement is certain to be attacked for its patchiness and for hollow commercial opportunism; but while students are being killed on university campuses in America, one can't help preferring its highly emotional, if faltering and uneven, tone to the slick reportage of a film like Medium Cool."

"The critics attacked the style instead of the substance", said Winkler, adding, "Most disappointing was the dismissal by audiences." Horovitz says when he saw the film "I was really upset with it. I thought it was too cute and Californian and too pretty." He came to accept the film "for what it is, what it was, and what it represented in the time in which it was made. I'm glad I got to write it." "Bad timing", said Davison. "Everyone had enough of the country tearing apart."

As a snapshot of its time, the film has collected many present-day fans, as David Sterritt writes for Turner Classic Movies:

Leonard Quart expressed a more measured view in Cineaste, writing that while The Strawberry Statement is basically a "shallow, pop version of the Sixties", it still provides "a taste of the period's dreams and volatility." That's a reasonable take on the film, which is more accurate than it may seem at first glance, depicting an uncertain time when many aspiring rebels were motivated as much by romance and excitement as by principles and ideologies. The Strawberry Statement is a terrific time machine that's also fun to watch.

=== Awards ===
The film won the Jury Prize at the 1970 Cannes Film Festival, tying with Magasiskola.

In 1971, Bruce Davison was nominated for his performance for the Laurel Awards "Male Star of Tomorrow".

== See also ==
- Port Huron Statement
- List of American films of 1970
- Columbia University protests of 1968
- Hippie
- Beatnik
- Counterculture of the 1960s
- Vietnam War
- Civil rights movement
- List of historic rock festivals
- Pacifism
- Gaza war protests in the United States
