= It's Me, Jerome =

It's Me, Jerome (Hungarian: Én vagyok Jeromos) is a 1970 Hungarian satirical film directed by István Tímár, and written by Lehel Szeberényi and Ferenc Jeli.

It stars Alfonzó (József Markos), Ferenc Kállai, Zsuzsa Pálos, Gábor Harsányi, István Bujtor and Nándor Tomanek.

The film mocks government corruption and the poor work ethic of labourers during socialism.
