= Student activism at Northwestern University =

Northwestern University

Similar to many undergraduate campuses across the United States, Northwestern University has had multiple student protests, some contemporary, but most are concentrated in the 1960s and early 1970s. Subjects of protests include anti-war sentiments, black student relations, and more.

== Historical Key Events ==
=== Student Power Marches and Student-Faculty Anti-War Protests ===
In the spring of 1967, Ellis Pines, a sophomore theater major, ran for president of the student government (student senate) on a "student power" platform. During the final days of the campaign, he held "bitch-ins" at the Rock, a centrally located student landmark, which led to two marches to the 619 Clark Street administration office. In response to the second march, two university leaders, Dean Payson Wild and Vice-president Franklin Kreml, came onto the steps of the building as Mr. Pines fielded questions from several hundred random (non-radical, non-organized) students while local TV stations recorded the event. The presence of the university officials gave some credibility to the campaign, and Mr. Pines narrowly won the election by 83 votes.

Archival documents referenced seem to associate this protest with a Vietnam War teach-in that happened in the same month, indicating that "in April 1967, the first anti-war rally took place on the Northwestern campus in the form of a Vietnam teach-in." Careful reading, however, shows that the events were concurrent but not connected.

According to Ellis Pines himself, this demonstration, the first of its kind at the university, took place during his candidacy and was not directed against the Vietnam War. Rather it focused on "student life" issues, i.e. parietal hours, open occupancy in Evanston housing for African-American students, greater autonomy in pursuing a creative education, etc. A faculty member, the late political science instructor Edward W. "Ted" Gude, took Mr. Pines aside during the campaign and told him that he would have faculty support so long as he addressed campus but not international issues. Mr. Pines complied, and he said nothing about Vietnam during his campaign and brief tenure in office. The international pledge, however, was broken when the distinguished and popular Slavic Languages and Literature Professor Irwin Weil approached Mr. Pines about sending a supportive message to President Lyndon Johnson on behalf of Israel from the Student Senate on the eve of the Six Day War (June 1967). Professor Weil was concerned that academia's opposition to the Vietnam War would be misconstrued as general anti-war opposition to President Johnson should he need to use force in the Middle East situation. Although Mr. Pines agreed to Professor Weil's request in bringing the matter to the attention of the Student Senate, he also invited officers from Chicago's Arab nation consulates to participate in what became a rousing but polite debate with the Israel advocates.

At a later time, Professor Gude did participate in a Vietnam teach-in.

On April 27, 1967, a demonstration by the name "Gentle Thursday" took place outside Harris Hall in view of the weekly NROTC drill on Deering Meadow. It was described that "the gathering resembled a student carnival more than a protest by militants."

=== Dow Chemical Company Demonstration ===
In early February 1968, students heard news of the Dow Chemical Company, the producer of the chemical weapon on napalm, recruiting on campus and began protesting. Starting at 60 and growing to 500 strong, the peaceful student demonstration on February 14, 1968 "articulated anti-war sentiment". A statement about the university's recruiting processes was released by the Director of Placement the day before the demonstration on February 13, 1968. It stated that "it is the policy of Northwestern University to help its students find employment. To that end, placement services are provided... Student groups have asked... 'Should the Dow Chemical Company be permitted to recruit at Northwestern?' My answer, in accordance with the policy I have stated, is yes." While the university ultimately did not change its decision to allow Dow on campus, Dean Roland J Hinz showed his support and concern for the cause saying that "It was a cracking good demonstration... [and] it may have an effect on university policy".

=== Black Student Sit-Ins (Apr. - Oct. 1968) ===
In May 1968, Northwestern's black students organized a sit-in in of the university Bursar's office to advocate for better race relations on campus. They hoped to persuade the administration to concede to their demands for increased admissions and financial aid,

for black students, "In organizing the Black Student Sit-In of May, 1968, students occupying the university Bursar's office wanted the university to improve race relations on campus by persuading the administration to concede to their formal demands. Included in these demands were increased admissions and financial aid for black students, creation of an all-black dorm and student center, addition of a Black Studies curriculum, and desegregation of the university's real estate holdings in Evanston. These records combine official statements from the university administration, the student protestors, the negotiations between the two, policy statements and press coverage of the sit-in."

"lack of communication between students and administration lead to a sit in on may 3 and 4 by the university's black students. the students sat outside the bursar's office with a list of 15 demands and grievances about how they felt they fit into the NU community. They sat there until their concerns were heard"

=== Medical School Sit-In ===
Northwestern medical students conducted a Sit-In against compulsory draft of medical school students to the army in May 1970. The Sit-In protested medical troop participants being drafted as combat soldiers as part of national service, and called to attention disparity of socioeconomic status and black populations in the medical student community.

=== Protests on Vietnam ===
Students and faculty of Northwestern held demonstrations against American involvement in the Vietnamese war. The demonstrations took place from 1969 to 1973, raising tension between intervention supporters and strong opposers in the student and faculty populations. The administration was confronted with accounting for the free expression of all perspectives, and maintaining a neutral stance in lieu of controversy.

== Contemporary Student Activism ==
=== Black House Protests ===
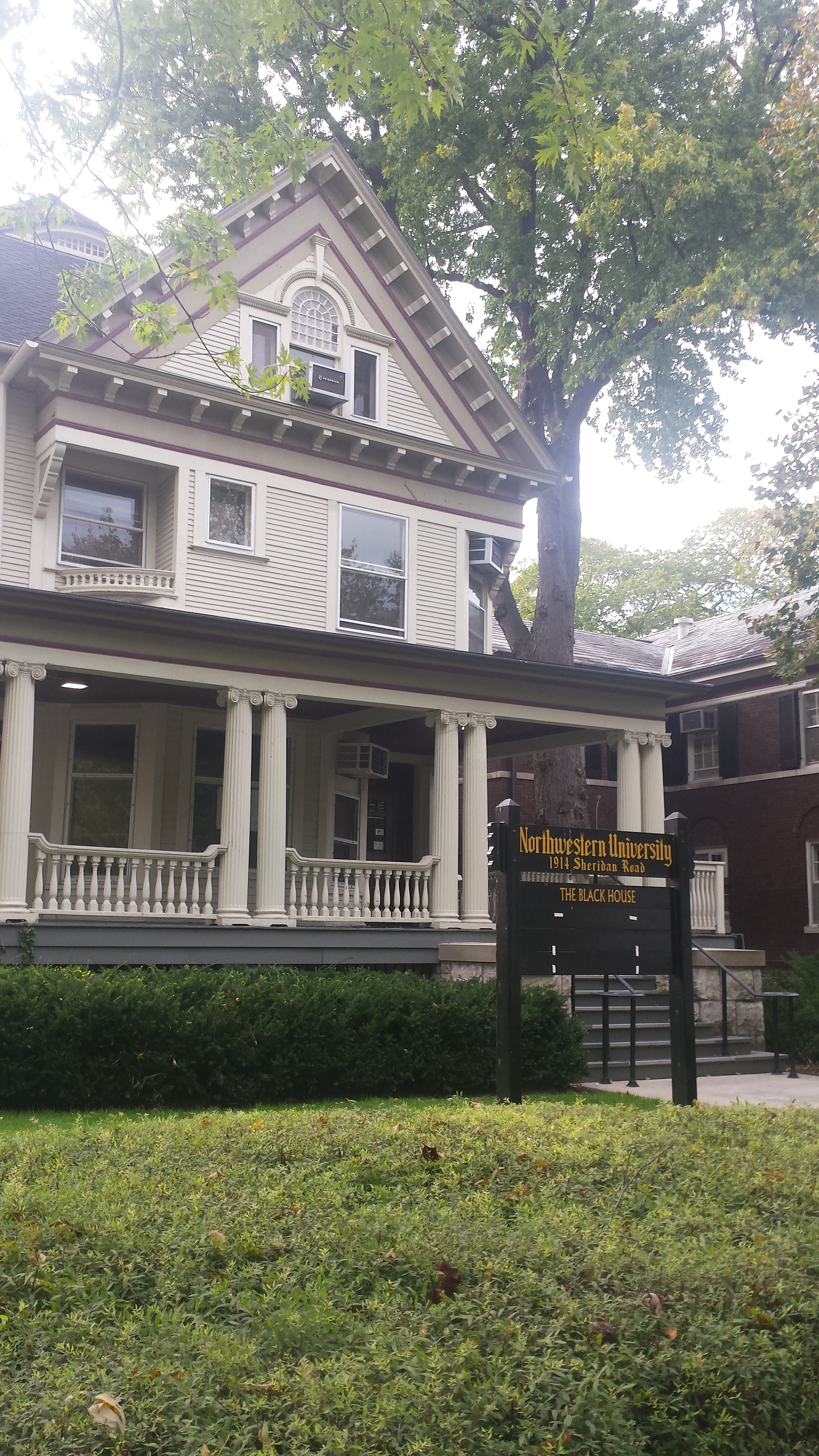
Proposed changes to the Black House in 2015 sparked Black student unrest

During the summer of 2015, Northwestern's Black community received an email summarizing the university's intentions to integrate the Black House with Multicultural Student Affairs. The email immediately sparked activism from both Black alumni and current students alike. Many felt that the lack of inclusion of the Black community on the decision was an infringement of the 1968 Agreement to improve the Black student experience from which the Black House was born. The university intended to move staff into the top floor of the house, and students responded asking to be involved in the decisions regarding changes to the space central to their experience. Listening sessions ensued, and according to Northwestern's Black Alumni Association, the community is now advocating the modernization of the space to make it not only a meeting space and resource center, but also the home of Northwestern's Black Student archives.

=== NU Divest ===
"After the June meeting, divestment leaders from Unshackle NU, NU Divest and Fossil Free NU, as well as Associated Student Government were under the impression that the University would drop two major components of the charter. One was that University President Morton Schapiro has to approve all voting members of the committee, and the other was that Chief Investment Officer Will McLean only has to forward recommendations of the committee to the Board of Trustees if he concurs. However, according to a copy of the charter obtained by The Daily, both components remained as of two weeks ago. "

"Three divestment campaigns are currently pushing for changes to the University's investments: In early March, ASG Senate passed an Unshackle NU-sponsored resolution that calls on the University to divest from corporations the group says promote mass incarceration.

Last February, after a tense five hours of debate, Senate narrowly passed a Northwestern Divest-sponsored resolution that called on the University to divest from six corporations the authors say violate Palestinians’ human rights.

As for coal divestment, Fossil Free NU has pushed the university to divest from fossil fuels since November 2014. In an online referendum held during ASG's presidential election in April 2015, almost three-quarters of voters said the university should divest from coal.

Divestment movements at Northwestern date back decades: In the 1980s, student activists lobbied the university to divest from companies doing business in Apartheid-era South Africa. Later movements targeted corporations operating in Burma and Sudan, both of which activists said violated human rights."

=== Athlete Unionization ===
In the winter of 2014 Cain Kolter, then two year starting quarterback for the Northwestern University football team, held a meeting with Head Coach Pat Fitzgerald to express concerns about how the NCAA rules and regulations put college athletes at a disadvantage in life. He spoke to Fitz about his concerns for healthcare after college athletes were done playing their sport and also for athletes being unfairly exploited. He partnered with Ramogi Huma, who played linebacker for UCLA in the late 1990s, to bring his case to the National Labor Relations Board.

Using ideas that he got from the National College Players Association, which started as the Collegiate Athletes Coalition created by Huma in 1996, Colter came up with the College Athletes Players Association, which very closely resembled the National Football League Players Association and the National Basketball Association Players Association. When Huma reached out to Colter on the phone the first thing Colter told him was that he wanted to unionize Northwestern's football team.

Although Colter's main concern was with longterm healthcare provisions for player, after talking with fellow athletes around the country other issues were brought to his attention such as the athlete stipend not being adequate enough to cover the total coast of attending college as an athlete, not having enough money to buy food, and not having scholarships that ensure four years of eligibility, meaning at the end of each season the head coach decides whether or not he wants to let you stay in the program and maintain your scholarship for another year. With all these things in mind Colter, partnered with Huma and Tim Waters, who headed the movement for the unionization of steelworkers, to create APU or All Players United.

== See also ==
- Student activism at Columbia University
