= Believe in Me (1971 film) =

1971 American film directed by Stuart Hagmann

- Theatrical poster
- Directed by: Stuart Hagmann
- Screenplay by: Israel Horovitz
- Produced by: Robert Chartoff; Irwin Winkler
- Starring: Michael Sarrazin; Jacqueline Bisset; Kevin Conway
- Cinematography: Richard C. Brooks; Richard C. Kratina
- Edited by: Andrew Horvitch; John C. Howard
- Music by: Fred Karlin
- Distributed by: MGM
- Release date: December 8, 1971; (NYC)
- Running time: 86 minutes
- Country: United States
- Language: English

Believe in Me is a 1971 American romantic drama film directed by Stuart Hagmann and written by Israel Horovitz. The film was produced by Robert Chartoff and Irwin Winkler.

== Plot ==
Medical student Remy has a flair for making his patients comfortable. His genuine concern for the patients in his charge marks him as a hot prospect in his internship program. Pamela works at a children's-book publishing company. The two meet via Pamela's brother, who is also Remy's good friend. They fall in love and get an apartment in New York City's East Village. Soon after, they begin to indulge in speed and barbiturates, then become heavily addicted. Remy is thrown out of medical school and Pamela quits her job. Remy soon lands in debt to the local dealer, Stutter, who introduces his customer to heroin as a revenge for his late bill. Pamela faces the prospect of getting sober at her brother's clinic, but must leave behind a destitute Remy in order to go.

== Cast ==
- Michael Sarrazin as Remy
- Jacqueline Bisset as Pamela
- Jon Cypher as Alan
- Allen Garfield as Stutter
- Kurt Dodenhoff as Matthew
- Kevin Conway as Clancy
- Roger Robinson as Angel
- Marcia Jean Kurtz as Emergency Room Nurse
- Ultra Violet as Emergency Room Patient

== Production ==
The film was originally called Speed is of the Essence and reunited the studio, director, producers and writer of The Strawberry Statement. Irwin Winkler wrote in his memoirs that MGM's then head of production James Aubrey was the one who cast Michael Sarrazin and Jacqueline Bisset, although the director and producer liked both actors. Winkler says Aubrey demanded reshoots be done by another director and the producers hired John Alviden to do another three weeks of filming; they would later work together on Rocky.

== Reception ==
The magazine New York's Judith Crist disliked Hagmann's direction and Horovitz's screenwriting and wrote, "[It] is a sloppy story about an intern driven to drugs because he sees kids and old people get sick, and who apparently makes his girl an addict too—or simply makes her stop wearing eyeliner. You can't tell which—and couldn't care less.

Roger Greenspun of The New York Times wrote that Believe in Me avoided melodrama seen in other drug films but found that it had predictable surprises and failed to explain "crucial" questions. He wrote, "[It] is full of plot hints dropped and never retrieved, and it seems to have been cut—not so much edited as maimed. When allowed some emotional range ... Stuart Hagmann directs a rather decent movie. But such moments are too few, and in suppressing even pathos, the film also suppresses the other feelings that could have made it live."

== See also ==
- List of American films of 1971
