= Hit & Run (EP) =

EP by Sloan
- Released: November 24, 2009
- Genre: Alternative rock, power pop
- Label: Murderecords

Sloan chronology
Parallel Play (2008)	Hit & Run (2009)	The Double Cross (2011)

Hit & Run is a 2009 EP by Canadian power pop quartet Sloan.

== Recording and release ==
The album was recorded in the summer of 2009, with the majority being completed before Chris Murphy's involvement in an actual hit and run collision in July, after which the EP is named. The EP was released on Sloan's own Murderecords label, in a digital download-only format.

On September 29, prior to the EP's release in November, the single "Take It Upon Yourself" was released as a free digital download to subscribers of Sloan's fan mailing list. In November 2018 - nine years after its digital release - Sloan announced they would be pressing and selling the EP on vinyl.

== Track list ==
1. "Take It Upon Yourself" - 2:34 (Murphy)
2. "Midnight Mass" - 2:10 (Ferguson)
3. "Is It Never" - 3:12 (Pentland)
4. "Where Are You Now?" - 2:02 (Scott)
5. "Oh Dear Diary" - 3:15 (Murphy)
6. "Get Out of Bed" - 2:45 (Scott) (iTunes/streaming bonus track)

== Reception ==
Andrew Scott's track "Where Are You Now?", described as "garage rockin'" and "full of crotch-rock swagger and shouts", reached the number one spot on the February 20 edition of CBC Radio 3's in-house R3-30 chart. The song spent a total of five weeks on the chart, having debuted on, "for the first time in R3-30 history", the unbroadcasted previous edition.
