= István Gaál =

Hungarian film director (1933–2007)

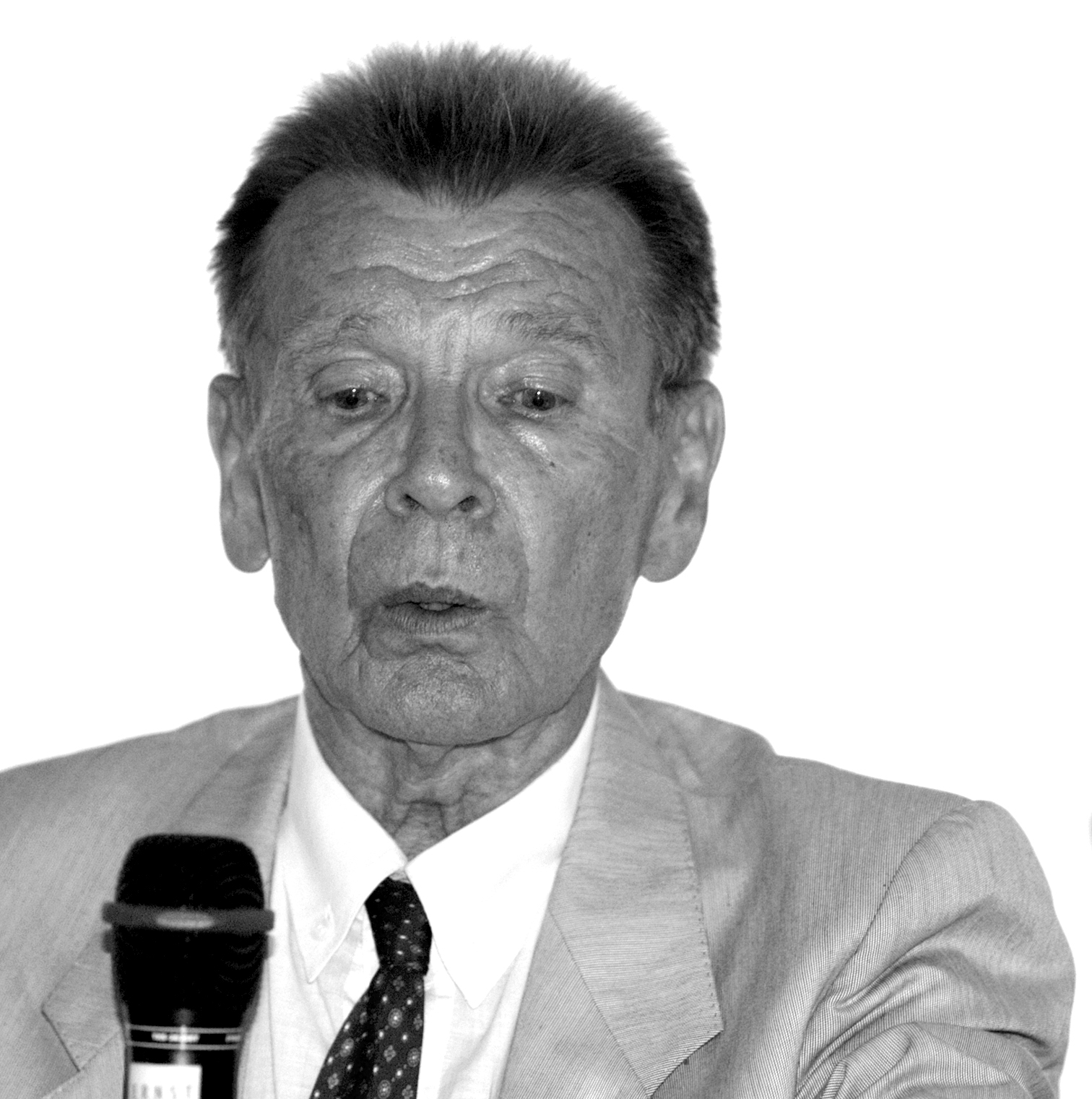
- Born: 25 August 1933; Salgótarján, Hungary
- Died: 25 September 2007 (aged 74); Budapest, Hungary
- Occupations: Film director, film editor, screenwriter
- Years active: 1956–1996

István Gaál (25 August 1933 – 25 September 2007) was a Hungarian film director, editor and screenwriter. He directed more than 20 films between 1956 and 1996. With Falcons he won the Jury Prize at the 1970 Cannes Film Festival.

== Selected filmography ==
- 1955: Fifty/Ötven (s)
- 1957: Surfacemen/Pályamunkások (s)
- 1961: Etude/Etűd (s)
- 1962: To and Fro/Oda-vissza (d)
- 1962: Tisza - Autumn Sketches/Tisza - Őszi vázlatok (d)
- Current (1963)
- 1965: Green Years/Zöldár
- 1967: Baptism/Keresztelő
- 1967: Chronicle/Krónika (d)
- 1969: Cuba's 10 Years/(Tíz) 10 éves Kuba (d)
- 1970: The Music of Night by Béla Bartók/Bartók Béla: Az éjszaka zenéje (s)
- The Falcons (1970)
- 1971: Dead Landscape/Holt vidék
- 1975: Our Heritage/Örökségünk (d)
- 1975: Pictures from the Life of a Town/Képek egy város életéből (d)
- 1976: Two Trains a Day/Naponta két vonat
- 1976: Customs Frontier/Vámhatár (tv)
- 1977: Legato/Legato
- Cserepek (1980)
- 1980: The Dance of Death/Haláltánc (tv)
- 1985: Orpheus and Eurydice/Orfeusz és Eurydiké
- 1986: Creatures of God/Isten teremtményei (tv)
- 1987: Uncle Béni/Béni bácsi (d)
- Peer Gynt (1988)
- 1989: Night/Éjszaka (tv)
- 1990: Music/Zene (d)
- 1995: Roman sonata/Római szonáta (d)
- 2000: Roots I-III./Gyökerek I-III. (d)
- 2004: Irregular Inventory of Paris/Rendhagyó párizsi leltár (tv)
- 2005: Kerala/Kerala (tv)
