= Eldridge Haynes =

American publisher (1904–1976)

Eldridge Haynes (1904–1976) was an American publisher and business executive. He is best remembered as the founder of Business International Corporation, headquarters in New York City, along with his son, Elliott Haynes as co-founder, and as a spokesman for free trade and advocate for the international business community.

== Life ==
His early career in journalism took him to McGraw-Hill, and then eventually into starting a new magazine called Modern Industry. Recognizing that American companies were increasingly investing abroad, he and his son founded Business International in 1953. By the time of his death in 1976, it had grown into a major source of international business information, research, and advisory services. This company was later acquired by The Economist.

The Haynes Prize for the Most Promising Scholar is awarded annually by Academy of International Business Foundation and the Eldridge Haynes Memorial Trust.

Haynes spent the later part of his life in the United States Virgin Islands. He founded various business groups and a nursing home on the island.
