= Greta Pope =

American jazz musician

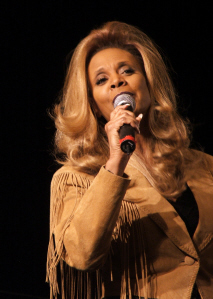
- Greta Pope at Eldee Young's Memorial, 2007
- Born: Cincinnati, Ohio, United States
- Occupations: Actress, singer, podcast host, author
- Years active: 1970–present
- Spouse(s): Edward Lawson Wimp, 1981- present
- Children: Edward Wickliffe Wimp (b.1989)
- Website: gretapope.com

Greta Pope is an American Singer, songwriter, bandleader and Podcast Host. An international entertainer, Greta Pope and the Greta Pope Orchestra have performed throughout Europe, the Far East, South America, the Caribbean, Canada and the United States. She is the two-time winner of the International Music Festival in Bucharest, Romania where she also served as an English speaking television commentator. She was one of the first American entertainers to perform in Bucharest Romania after the Romanian Revolution of 1989.

She is the daughter-in-law of Duke Ellington's vocalist Kay Davis. She owns and operates Greta Pope Entertainment, Inc.

== Life ==
She was born Greta Denise Pope in Cincinnati, Ohio, United States, to Margaret Wickliffe Pope, a businesswoman and William Allen Pope, a mechanical engineer. In 1981, Greta Pope married Edward Lawson Wimp. They have one son, Edward Wickliffe Wimp.

=== Education ===
Pope attended Kennedy Elementary School. She also attended Woodward High School and sang in the Woodward High School Ensemble. She played violin in the Woodward Orchestra. She was also a member of The Cincinnati Youth Symphony. She played first violin under the baton of Cincinnati Symphony Concertmaster Sigmund Effron. She began playing piano at age 6 and violin at age 11.

After graduating from The Western College with a liberal arts degree, she went to Miami University where she completed a Master of Music degree in vocal performance and pedagogy. She went on to Indiana University for postgraduate vocal study with Eileen Farrell. Pope holds a Ph.D. in Business Administration from the University of Wisconsin.

== Career ==
=== Film and TV ===
Pope has recorded many television and radio commercials. In 1970, she appeared in The Strawberry Statement.

=== Radio ===
Pope was producer, engineer, and host of Jazz and More!...with Greta Pope, a weekly radio show that aired on WRHC-LP Radio Harbor Country in Three Oaks, Michigan

=== Podcast ===
Pope is the producer and host of The Business Savvy Singer Podcast, providing a weekly conversations with professional singers with a variety of experience in the music industry.

=== Music ===
Pope has recorded four studio recordings. She has also recorded with Montenegrin singer Zoran Kalezic on the 2011 remake of his 1990 hit "Moj dobri andjele". Pope worked as a performer and as a music director for Kings Island. She performed shows with the United Service Organization throughout the Far East, Europe and America entertaining United States servicemen and servicewomen.

=== Author ===
She is the author of Music, Money & You: Managing the Business.

=== Teaching and community ===
Pope is the Founder and Director of The Private Music Studio, a multi-disciplinary arts in education enrichment program that teaches music through singing, public speaking and proper use of the voice. She was elected to the SAG-AFTRA Chicago Board in 2013. Pope is an adjunct faculty member of the Chicago High School for the Arts (ChiArts). She also serves on the board of World Chicago.

From 2006-2008, she served on the board of Morgan Park Academy. Pope has also served on the board of the Ronald McDonald House Charities. Along with her husband, a founding member, she has been heavily involved with the National McDonald's Black Owner's Association (NBMOA).

In 2016, Pope was named Civic Chairman of the Chicago Sinfonietta Ball. She is also the Governing Council Chair of Advocate Trinity Hospital, a sister hospital of Advocate Lutheran General Hospital.

=== Discography ===
- The Night Begins (2003)
- Till There Was You (2009)
- International Interlude (2013)
- Dr. Greta Pope’s MOTOWN…Pride of the Motor City (2019)

=== Filmography ===
- The Strawberry Statement (1970)
