= Stuart Hagmann =

American film director

- Born: September 2, 1942 (age 84); Sturgeon Bay, Wisconsin, U.S.
- Occupations: Film director, television director

Stuart R. Hagmann (born September 2, 1942) is an American television and film director primarily active from 1968 to 1977.

His television work includes episodes of the series Mission: Impossible and Mannix. In film he is noted for directing The Strawberry Statement (1970), which was co-winner of the Cannes Film Festival's Jury Prize.

== Filmography ==
=== Film ===
| Year | Title | Notes |
|---|---|---|
| 1970 | The Strawberry Statement | |
| 1970 | Apropos Film | |
| 1971 | Believe in Me | |

=== Television ===
| Year | Title | Notes |
|---|---|---|
| 1968 | N.Y.P.D. (TV series) | |
| 1968-1970 | Mannix | 4 episodes |
| 1969 | Mission Impossible | |
| 1973 | She Lives! | |
| 1975 | Bronk | |
| 1977 | Tarantulas: The Deadly Cargo | |
