= Columbia Revolt =

- Release date: 1968
- Country: United States
- Language: English

Part one of Columbia Revolt

Part two

Columbia Revolt is a 50-minute, black-and-white documentary film about the Columbia University protests of 1968. The film was made that year by a collective of independent filmmakers called Newsreel and mostly shot by Melvin Margolis. It features a number of off-camera interviews with unnamed students who were involved in the takeover of university buildings.

According to Roz Payne, a member of the Newsreel collective who worked on the film:

The students had taken over 5 buildings. We had a film team in each building. We were shooting from the inside while the rest of the press were outside. We participated in the political negotiations and discussions. Our cameras were used as weapons as well as recording the events. Melvin had a World War II cast iron steel Bell and Howell camera that could take the shock of breaking plate glass windows.

The film is sympathetic to the students and is shot in a Cinéma vérité style. It is now in the public domain.

== See also ==
- List of American films of 1968
- Columbia University
- Columbia University protests of 1968
- Cinéma vérité
- Political Cinema
