= Al Roelofs =

Art director

- Born: 27 October 1906; Rotterdam
- Died: 2 July 1990 (aged 83); Los Angeles, California
- Occupation: Art director
- Years active: 1947–1982

Alexander Y. "Al" Roelofs (27 October 1906 – 2 July 1990) was a Dutch-born American art director. He was nominated for an Academy Award in the category Best Art Direction for the film The Island at the Top of the World.

Roelofs was born "Alexander IJsbrand Roelofs" in Rotterdam to Paul Roelofs and Catharina de Breij.

== Selected filmography ==
- The Island at the Top of the World (1974)
- Escape to Witch Mountain (1975)
