= The Island at the Top of the World =

1974 film by Robert Stevenson

- Theatrical release poster by Eric Pulford
- Directed by: Robert Stevenson
- Written by: Ian Cameron (novel); John Whedon (screenplay)
- Produced by: Winston Hibler
- Starring: Donald Sinden; David Hartman; Jacques Marin; Mako; Agneta Eckemyr
- Cinematography: Frank V. Phillips
- Edited by: Robert Stafford
- Music by: Maurice Jarre
- Production company: Walt Disney Productions
- Distributed by: Buena Vista Distribution
- Release date: December 20, 1974 (with Winnie the Pooh and Tigger Too)
- Running time: 94 minutes
- Country: United States
- Languages: English; Swedish; Norwegian; Danish; Icelandic
- Budget: $8 million
- Box office: $10 million (US/Canada rentals)

The Island at the Top of the World is a 1974 American live-action lost world fantasy adventure film directed by Robert Stevenson and produced by Winston Hibler. It was released by Walt Disney Productions, distributed by Buena Vista Distribution and starring Donald Sinden and David Hartman.

== Plot ==
In London in the year 1907, widowed British aristocrat, industrialist, and millionaire, Sir Anthony Ross hastily arranges an expedition to the Arctic to search for his lost son, Donald. Donald has become lost on a whaling expedition to find the fabled island where whales go to die.

Sir Anthony employs the talents of Scandinavian-American archaeologist Professor John Ivarsson and Captain Brieux, a French inventor/aeronaut who pilots the expedition in a French dirigible named the Hyperion, which Captain Brieux invented. Upon reaching the Arctic, they meet Oomiak, a comically cowardly/brave Inuk friend of Donald's, and trick him into helping them join in the search.

Ultimately, the expedition becomes (temporarily) separated from Captain Brieux, and discovers an uncharted island named Astragard, occupied by a lost civilization of Norsemen (Vikings), hidden from the rest of the world for centuries. They capture Sir Anthony and Ivarsson, but Oomiak escapes. Shortly thereafter they find Donald, but are nearly put to death by the outrageously fanatical and xenophobic Godi (pronounced /ˈɡoʊdi/ GOH-dee), a lawspeaker/authority figure.

The three men (Sir Anthony, Ivarsson and Donald) are saved from being burned alive by a virtuous girl named Freyja, with whom Donald is deeply and mutually in love. They escape, and are rejoined by Oomiak and eventually find the Whale's Graveyard, but are attacked by killer whales. Here they are saved by the sudden reappearance of Captain Brieux, but they are still being pursued by the angry Godi and his reluctant warriors.

Finally, the Godi is killed by an explosion when he shoots a flaming arrow at the Hyperion; the Vikings feel sorry for the four adventurers for their prejudice-driven aggression led by the Godi. They believe his dark behavior towards the newcomers have angered the Norse gods. To appease the gods, they will not let the expedition return to their world unless one of them remains behind as a hostage, to prevent them from divulging the existence of Astragard to the outside world.

Ivarsson willingly volunteers to stay, as this represents a chance to relive history. Ivarsson also points out that if someday mankind is ever foolish enough to destroy itself, places like Astragard may become humanity's final refuge.

Sir Anthony, Donald, Freyja, Captain Brieux and Oomiak, are allowed to depart in peace, promising not to tell the outside world about Astragard. As Ivarsson heads back to Astragard, he turns to look back just in time to see his five friends move further and further away until they vanish into the Arctic mist.

== Cast ==
- Donald Sinden – Sir Anthony Ross
- David Hartman – Prof. Ivarsson
- Jacques Marin – Captain Brieux
- Mako – Oomiak
- David Gwillim – Donald Ross
- Agneta Eckemyr – Freyja
- Gunnar Öhlund – The Godi
- Lasse Kolstad – Erik
- Erik Silju – Torvald
- Rolf Søder – The Lawspeaker
- Torsten Wahlund – Sven
- Sverre Anker Ousdal – Gunnar
- Niels Hinrichsen – Sigurd
- Denny Miller – Town Guard
- Brendan Dillon – The Factor
- James Almanzar as French Engineer
- Ivor Barry as The Butler
- Lee Paul as Chief of Boat Archers

== Production ==
Map showing location of the island at about 85°N 67°W

The film's pre-production lasted for several years. The 30th Anniversary Edition of the film, released by Walt Disney Studios Home Entertainment in 2004, includes a "1968 Pre-Production Trailer" as a bonus feature, which includes an interview with producer Winston Hibler.

== Hyperion Airship ==
Hyperion is the name of the airship featured in The Island at the Top of the World. The airship appears for only a relatively small portion of the overall length of the film, but plays a prominent role, both as a memorable set piece and in the film's plot line. Hyperion was featured prominently in all film promotional materials.

As depicted in the film, the airship Hyperion is a semi-rigid dirigible approximately 200 feet long. The ship features a highly streamlined crimson or rose-coloured gas bag (envelope) and an enclosed control gondola suspended from a thin exposed service catwalk. Twin gasoline engines, positioned in the rear of the catwalk drive two propellers that extend outward from either side of the catwalk on a metal truss. The rudders are also suspended from the rear of the catwalk. The envelope of the ship contains stabilizer fins in the rear and front and is crisscrossed by rope netting. In the film, the gondola and rear portion of the service catwalk, containing the engines, are detached to allow the balloon to float freely. It is sometimes believed that this was a built-in feature of the airship. However, it is hinted to in the film that the Captain had modified the ship after crash landing in order to escape the island.

Hyperion was designed by the film's production design team headed by Peter Ellenshaw. The airship existed as several scale models built for the film. The press kit for the 1974 release of the film boasts that Goodyear blimp pilots were consulted on the Hyperion's design and deemed it theoretically airworthy. The airship bears a striking resemblance to the semi-rigid airships developed by Lebaudy Frères, such as Lebaudy Patrie and République. Whether these real airships served as inspiration is uncertain.

Hyperion was planned to be part of a major attraction called Discovery Bay, which was planned for Disneyland in Anaheim, California. The film did poorly at the box office. This attraction was never built, but some Disneyland planning models and sketches depict a large wooden hangar with the nose of a life-size replica of Hyperion protruding from the hangar's open doors. The hangar was to house a ride that was described as having the park visitors enter the hangar and climb aboard Hyperion. They would then be taken on an aerial adventure over the Arctic based on the film. The ride was planned to use real film and a moving platform to simulate the ride. Hyperion was prominently featured in a limited edition artist representation of Discovery Bay. The artwork features the airship's nose protruding from a large wooden hangar that is perched on the edge of a lagoon where Nautilus from 20,000 Leagues Under The Sea is seen parked. Postcards of the artist concept were also sold inside the Disneyland theme parks. However, the dismal box-office sales of The Island At The Top Of The World caused Disney to scrap the ride.

Hyperion lives on today at Disneyland Paris. The airship is housed in a hangar in Discoveryland where the Videopolis theatre and café is located. The appearance of the dirigible was slightly altered from the design of the ship in the film.

== Writing ==
The film was based on the 1961 novel The Lost Ones, written by Ian Cameron, set in the location of Prince Patrick Island. To tie in with the film, the novel was reissued with the movie's title. There were several changes from the book to the film. The novel is set in 1960, but the film is set in 1907. Instead of Prince Patrick Island, the island in the film is located due north of Ellesmere Island (cf. Crocker Land). Several extra characters and the airship Hyperion appear in the film, but not in the novel. Also, the greatest departure in the film is that Freyja survives to (presumably) live happily ever after with Donald, whereas in the book she dies, sacrificing herself to save Donald and Sir Anthony.

== Release ==
The film, which was produced by Walt Disney Pictures, was released together with the animated featurette Winnie the Pooh and Tigger Too in a family-oriented roadshow package.

The film received an Academy Award for Best Art Direction nomination for its art direction/set decoration by (Peter Ellenshaw, John B. Mansbridge, Walter H. Tyler, Al Roelofs, and Hal Gausman).

A sequel was planned, entitled The Lost Ones, based more closely on the original novel, but was abandoned when it became apparent that Island at the Top of the World would not be a box office success.

== Reception ==
On Rotten Tomatoes the film has an approval rating of 50% based on reviews from 10 critics.

Nora Sayre of The New York Times wrote, "At moments, the Scandinavian actors seem slightly hampered by having to speak so much old Norse, but their dragon ships are first rate. And the small children in the audience—who broadcasted their responses and opinions throughout—enjoyed the movie loudly." Variety stated, "Turning to live-action fantasy and stunning use of special effects, Disney comes up with a firstrate entry for the general market in this imaginative meller filmed partially in the Arctic." Gene Siskel of the Chicago Tribune gave the film one-and-a-half stars out of four, calling it a "20,000 Leagues Under the Sea ripoff" with David Hartman contributing "one of the year's worst performances by an actor." Kevin Thomas of the Los Angeles Times called it "the best live-action feature from Disney in years. A lively, imaginative epic adventure of much charm and wide appeal, it marks a refreshing departure from the studio's all-too-frequent blend of coyness and cut-rate production values and special effects." Gary Arnold of The Washington Post wrote that the film "gets by if you don't mind an essentially passive, poky approach to adventure", and called the accompanying featurette, Winnie the Pooh and Tigger Too, "a livelier and more amusing film." Geoff Brown of The Monthly Film Bulletin wrote that the movie "tells its tale with abundant good humour and is a constant visual delight."

Nick Pratt reviewed The Island at the Top of the World for Imagine magazine, and stated that "overall there is little to recommend a film which alternates uneasily between the dully predictable and the unintentionally comic."

Dirk Libbey of CinemaBlend describes that the movie has "no major stars and is seen by some as an attempt to recreate the magic of 20,000 Leagues Under The Sea, swapping out the submersible for an airship."

== Soundtrack ==
The film's score was created by film composer Maurice Jarre. The score featured sweeping themes that were tinged with ethnic string and percussion instruments that helped to portray the various cultures represented in the film.

=== Recording ===
In order to have better balance control over the individual instruments and orchestral sections, the score was recorded on multiple reels of synchronized 35mm magnetic film. Since multiple reels of 3-track magnetic film were synchronized over several recording sessions in order to have all the tracks in the recording, it was possible to have several different versions of the score from which to choose. In addition, many of the exotic percussion and other instruments were overdubbed later, after the initial orchestral sessions were completed. The score was then mixed down to mono along with the final dialog, sound effects and score for insertion into the film.

In 1974, to accompany the film release, Disney released a story record album containing audio clips from the film, an eleven-page illustrated booklet. The story was narrated by bass voice actor Thurl Ravenscroft. Jarre's score for the film was re-recorded on solo organ for the storybook record release and does not contain the orchestral recording of the score that was used in the film. (1974: Disneyland Records – Catalog No. 3814, Mono, LP format)

During the 1970s, portions of the orchestral score to Island at the Top of the World were used in Disneyland's Adventureland. Jarre's music was mixed with various other music cues from other Disney films and attractions to create a continuous loop of ambient adventure music. The music collage was played in ride cues, restaurants and shopping areas inside the park.

In 1994, the laser videodisc release of the film included the monaural score isolated on the left analog audio track.

In 2010, the main title music from the film was presented on a 4-CD compilation of Maurice Jarre film music entitled Le Cinema De Maurice Jarre, released in France. The track was in mono and presumably sourced from the original session mixdown.

In March 2012, Intrada record label released the complete score to the film on compact disc (Intrada Special Collection, Volume 193). For the release, engineers were given access to the Disney vaults containing the complete original recording elements, which were recorded onto multiple reels of 35mm magnetic film. Intrada synchronized the recording elements and remixed the entire film score, resulting in a restored version heard in stereo for the very first time.

== Other ==
Hyperion is a brand used by Disney for publishing endeavors, from the early 1990s. In 1926, the Disney brothers opened The Walt Disney Studio, 2719 Hyperion Avenue, Los Angeles.

== See also ==
- List of American films of 1974
- The Sannikov Land (film)
- The Land That Time Forgot
- The People That Time Forgot
- Robur the Conqueror
- Thule
