= The Territory of Others =

1970 film

- Directed by: François Bel; Jacqueline Fano; Michel Fano; Gérard Vienne
- Cinematography: François Bel; Gérard Vienne
- Edited by: Jacqueline Fano
- Release date: December 1970
- Running time: 87 minutes
- Country: France
- Language: French

The Territory of Others (French: Le territoire des autres) is a 1970 French documentary film directed by François Bel. It was entered into the 1970 Cannes Film Festival where it won the Technical Grand Prize.
