= The Falcons (film) =

1970 Hungarian film by István Gaál

Magasiskola
- Directed by: István Gaál
- Written by: István Gaál; Mészöly Miklós
- Starring: Ivan Andonov
- Cinematography: Elemér Ragályi
- Edited by: István Gaál
- Release date: 10 September 1970
- Running time: 100 minutes
- Country: Hungary
- Language: Hungarian

The Falcons (Hungarian: Magasiskola) is a 1970 Hungarian film directed by István Gaál about the training of falcons for use on farms to protect crops from birds. It is based on the 1967 novel by Mészöly Miklós. It won the Jury Prize at the 1970 Cannes Film Festival, tying with The Strawberry Statement.

== Cast ==
- Ivan Andonov - Fiú
- György Bánffy - Lilik
- Gyula Bay
- Gyula Gulyás
- Gábor Harsányi
- Pál Hriazik
- Péter Kertész
- Judit Meszléry - Teréz
- Gábor Nadai
- Sándor Nagy
- Mihály Nyúl
- Ferenc Paláncz
- József Zémann
