= Christopher's House =

1979 film

- Directed by: Lars Lennart Forsberg
- Written by: Johan Bargum; Lars Lennart Forsberg; Vilgot Sjöman
- Produced by: Måns Reuterswärd
- Starring: Thommy Berggren
- Cinematography: Lennart Carlsson
- Edited by: Lars Lennart Forsberg
- Release date: 19 September 1979
- Running time: 98 minutes
- Country: Sweden
- Language: Swedish

Christopher's House (Swedish: Kristoffers hus) is a 1979 Swedish drama film directed by Lars Lennart Forsberg. It competed in the Un Certain Regard section at the 1980 Cannes Film Festival.

== Cast ==
- Thommy Berggren - Kristoffer
- Agneta Eckemyr - Hanna
- Börje Ahlstedt - Börje
- Mimi Pollak - Grandma
- Gunnel Broström - The Mother
- Pia Garde - The Sick Girl
- Majlis Granlund - The Sick Girl's Mother
- Linda Megner - Frida
- Birgitta Andersson - Helena Sandholm
- Per Oscarsson - Kräftan
- Silvija Bardh - Siri
- Stig Ossian Ericson - Stenkil
- Gunnar Friberg - Journalist
- Marie Göranzon - Mona
- Sten Johan Hedman - Leif
