= 7th Guldbagge Awards =

Swedish film awards

- Date: 26 October 1970
- Site: Filmhuset, Stockholm, Sweden
- Hosted by: Bo Jonsson

Highlights
- Best Picture: A Swedish Love Story; Mistreatment

The 7th Guldbagge Awards ceremony, presented by the Swedish Film Institute, honored the best Swedish films of 1969 and 1970, and took place on 26 October 1970. A Swedish Love Story and Mistreatment were presented with the award for Best Film.

== Awards ==
- Best Film:
  - A Swedish Love Story by Roy Andersson
  - Mistreatment by Lars Lennart Forsberg
- Best Director: Lars Lennart Forsberg for Mistreatment
- Best Actor: Carl-Gustaf Lindstedt for Harry Munter
- Best Actress: Anita Ekström for Jänken
- Special Achievement: Harry Schein
