= The Architect's Resistance =

The Architects' Resistance (TAR) is a group formed in 1968 by architecture students from Columbia University, the Massachusetts Institute of Technology and Yale University. The group was formed as "a communications network, a research group, and an action group . . . concerned about the social responsibility of architects and the framework within which architecture is practiced."

The group produced position papers titled: "Architecture and Racism," "Architects and the Nuclear Arms Race," and "Architecture: Whom Does It Serve?"

The "Architecture and Racism" position paper led to the picketing of Skidmore, Owings & Merrill by TAR in 1969 for its design of the Carlton Centre in Johannesburg, South Africa during apartheid.

== See also ==
- Columbia University protests of 1968
