= Agneta Eckemyr =

Swedish actress and model (1950–2018)

Agneta Marie-Anne Eckemyr (2 July 1950 – 29 December 2018) was a Swedish actress, model and clothing designer.

== Biography ==
Eckemyr was born in Karlsborg in the county of Västra Götaland. She started modelling at a young age, and moved to New York City in the United States when she was 20 years old.

She was photographed by Life Magazine appearing opposite the five semi finalist actors for the role of James Bond in On Her Majesty's Secret Service. Shortly after appearing in the 1974 Disney family film production The Island at the Top of the World, Eckemyr appeared on the front cover and within the October 1975 edition of Playboy magazine, in a pictorial on Sapphic love. Her success in the US led to offers of high-profile roles in Sweden, and in 1975 she appeared in Lejonet och jungfrun (The Lion and the Virgin) with Sven-Bertil Taube and directed by Lars-Magnus Lindgren.

After retirement from being an actress, she turned her talents to clothing design. Her final designs were featured at Älskning (Swedish for Darling) on Columbus Avenue in Manhattan, New York City, a block from where she lived in an apartment overlooking Central Park. She moved back to Sweden in 2013, and died in Stockholm in 2018.

== Filmography ==
- 1971: Blindman – Pilar
- 1974: The Island at the Top of the World – Freyja
- 1975: Lejonet och jungfrun – Virgo
- 1977: The Kentucky Fried Movie – Ming Chow (segment "A Fistful of Yen")
- 1978: CHiPs episode Flashback! –1st Woman in Car
- 1979: Winter Kills – Nurse One
- 1979: Kristoffers hus – Hanna
- 1980: Flygnivå 450 – Aino
- 1981: Olsson per sekund eller Det finns ingen anledning till oro – Inger
- 1982: Brusten himmel – Märta
