= Parallel Play (album) =

Studio album by Sloan
- Released: June 10, 2008
- Genre: Rock, power pop
- Length: 37:17
- Label: murderecords, Yep Roc Records
- Producer: Nick Detoro, Sloan

Sloan chronology
Never Hear the End of It (2006)	Parallel Play (2008)	Hit & Run (EP) (2009)

Professional ratings
Review scores
Source	Rating
Allmusic	4/5 stars
Pitchfork Media	(7.6/10)
Spin	3/5 stars
CHARTattack	3.5/5 stars
Entertainment Weekly	B+

Parallel Play is the ninth studio album by Canadian rock band Sloan. At the time of its release, it was the band's shortest studio album. The first single released from the album was "Believe in Me", with "I'm Not a Kid Anymore" also being released as a single. A music video was also produced for the song "Witch's Wand". The song "The Other Side" was featured on the popular American television series, Castle (3x22, 2011). The album was nominated for "Rock Album of the Year" at the 2009 Juno Awards.

== Track listing ==
All tracks are written by Sloan.

No.	Title	Lead vocals	Length
1.	"Believe in Me"	Patrick Pentland	3:17
2.	"Cheap Champagne"	Jay Ferguson	2:46
3.	"All I Am Is All You're Not"	Chris Murphy	3:03
4.	"Emergency 911"	Andrew Scott	1:50
5.	"Burn for It"	Patrick Pentland	2:38
6.	"Witch's Wand"	Jay Ferguson	2:50
7.	"The Dogs"	Andrew Scott	3:54
8.	"Living the Dream"	Chris Murphy	2:52
9.	"The Other Side"	Patrick Pentland	2:53
10.	"Down in the Basement"	Andrew Scott	2:58
11.	"If I Could Change Your Mind"	Jay Ferguson	2:07
12.	"I'm Not a Kid Anymore"	Chris Murphy	2:26
13.	"Too Many"	Andrew Scott	3:43
Total length:			37:17
