= Anita Ekström =

Swedish actress (1943–2022)

- Born: Gertrud Anita Ekström; 13 January 1943; Solna, Sweden
- Died: 18 June 2022 (aged 79)
- Occupation: Actress
- Years active: 1969–2019
- Spouse: Leif Ångström (m. 1990–2013)

Gertrud Anita Ekström (13 January 1943 – 18 June 2022) was a Swedish actress. At the 7th Guldbagge Awards she won the award for Best Actress for her role in Jänken. She has appeared in more than 30 films and television shows since 1969.

She was born on 13 January 1943.

In addition to her acting career, she also taught at the Swedish National Academy of Mime and Acting in Stockholm.

== Selected filmography ==
- Jänken (1970)
- A Handful of Love (1974)
- The Rider on the White Horse (1978)
- I Am Maria (1979)
- Children's Island (1980)
- Tuppen (1981)
- 1939 (1989)
- Roseanna (1993)
