= A. Bruce Goldman =

American rabbi (1935–2020)

- Born: June 1935
- Died: April 2, 2020
- Occupation: Rabbi

A. Bruce Goldman (June 1935 – April 2, 2020) was an American rabbi and amateur photographer known for his progressive views and activism.

== Biography ==
Goldman first came to national attention with his defense of the right of undergraduate students to co-habit in dormitories, which was then in violation of some colleges' rules.

Goldman received increased notoriety in 1968, during the 1968 Columbia University protests against racism and the Vietnam War. Goldman, then the Jewish chaplain at Columbia University, placed himself as a nonviolent intervenor when police forces moved in to attack students performing a sit-in. The police nonetheless attacked the students, and Goldman was beaten to a semi-conscious state by the police, and had to be hospitalized. Goldman, himself an opponent of the Vietnam War, continued to support student protestors, through their occupation of administrative offices on campus. For his actions, Goldman was let go by the board of directors of the university's Jewish organization, although he remained at Columbia as an advisor to Jewish students until the mid-1970s. His activism within Columbia University's Jewish community continued through this time. Goldman was arrested alongside members of the Columbia Radical Jewish Union in 1970 for disrupting services at Temple Emanu-El in protest of the Vietnam War, although the charges were later dismissed.

In 1972 he and several other interested parties signed an open letter to the Anti-Defamation League. Part of the letter said: "While we do not necessarily agree with the programs and policies of the Socialist Workers Party, we believe that their opposition to Zionism cannot in any way be equated with anti-Semitism".

During the 1970s, he hosted a radio program on WBAI called "Up Against the Wailing Wall", which discussed Jewish issues.

Goldman made an appearance in an infamous episode of the TV show Geraldo, hosted by Geraldo Rivera, where a fight broke out between Roy Innis and a group of neo-Nazis.

In the 1990s he became well known for willingness to perform weddings where one partner was Jewish and the other Christian, a practice frowned upon by most churches and most denominations of Judaism. In a 1998 piece for The New York Times, Goldman estimated he performed 3,300 marriages involving non-Jews.

Goldman lived in New York City until his death on April 2, 2020 at the age of 84, from COVID-19.
