= 1968 Columbia University protests =

US student demonstrations against racism and Vietnam War

- Part of the Black Power movement, the Protests of 1968, and the Opposition to the Vietnam War
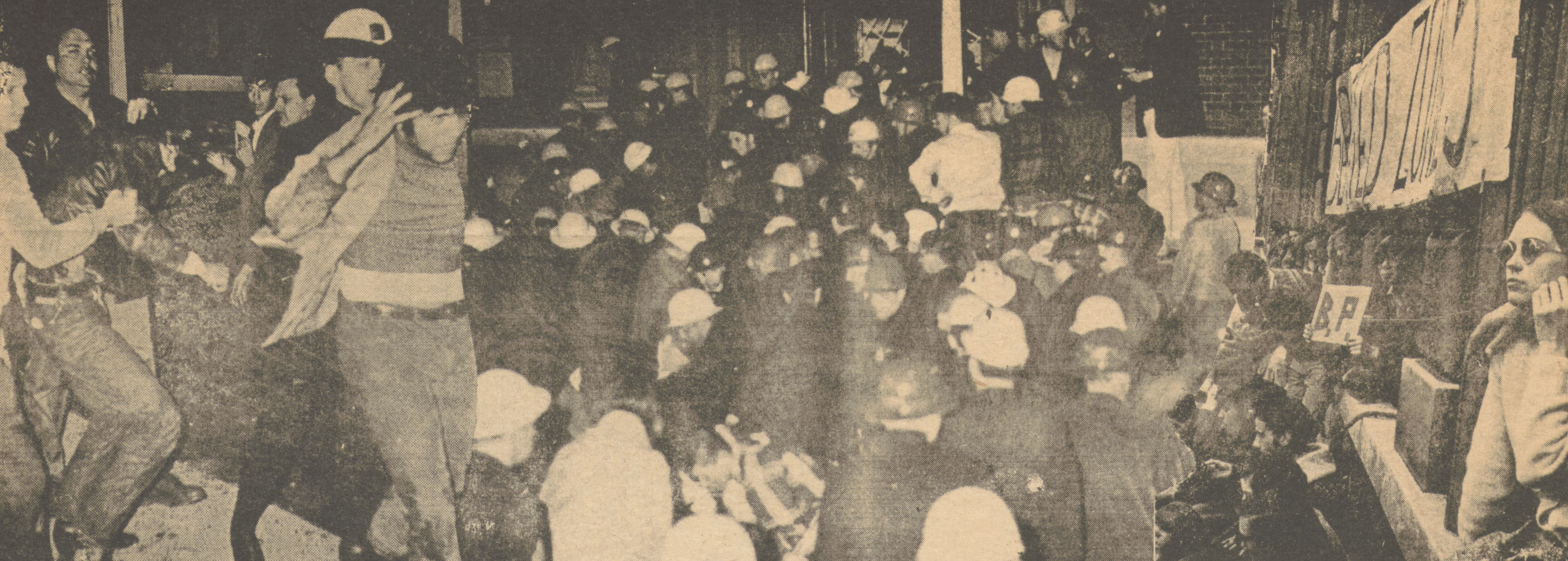
- A collage of student protest and police repression at Columbia in 1968, published in Helix vol. 3, 7th ed., May 9, 1968
- Date: 27 March – 30 April 1968 (first round) (1 month and 3 days) 17–22 May 1968 (second round) (5 days)
- Location: Columbia University, New York
- Methods: Student strike; Occupations

Parties
Students for a Democratic Society; Student Afro-Society	Columbia University; New York City Police Department

In 1968, a series of protests at Columbia University in New York City were one among the various student demonstrations that occurred around the globe in that year. The Columbia protests erupted over the spring of that year after students discovered links between the university and the institutional apparatus supporting the United States' involvement in the Vietnam War, as well as their concern over an allegedly segregated gymnasium to be constructed in the nearby Morningside Park. The protests led to student occupations of Hamilton Hall and many university buildings, starting with Hamilton Hall, and the eventual violent removal of protesters by the New York City Police Department.

The protests were successful in getting university's administration to scrap the gymnasium project in Morningside Park and disaffiliate from the Institute for Defense Analyses, a military research corporation supporting the US invasion of Vietnam. The Cox Commission, organized at the behest of the executive committee of the Faculty to investigate the protests, found in its report published later that year that channels of communication between the university's administration, faculty, and students were ineffective or lacking, and supported the idea of establishing a representative university senate.

== Background ==
=== Discovery of IDA documents ===
A former Columbia University Students for a Democratic Society activist named Bob Feldman claimed in 2022 to have discovered documents from early March 1967, in the International Law Library detailing Columbia's institutional affiliation with the Institute for Defense Analyses (IDA), a weapons research think tank affiliated with the United States Department of Defense. The nature of the association had not been, to that point, publicly announced by the university.

Prior to March 1967, the IDA had rarely been mentioned in the U.S. media or in the left, underground or campus press. A few magazine articles on the IDA had appeared between 1956 and 1967 and the IDA had been mentioned in a few books for academic specialists published by university presses. The RAND Corporation, not the Institute for Defense Analyses, was the military-oriented think tank that had received most of the publicity prior to March 1967. But after Feldman's name appeared in some leftist publications in reference to the Columbia-IDA revelation, the FBI opened a file on him and started to investigate, according to Feldman's declassified FBI files.

The discovery of the IDA documents touched off a Columbia SDS anti-war campaign between April 1967 and April 1968, which demanded the Columbia University administration resign its institutional membership in the Institute for Defense Analyses. Following a peaceful demonstration inside the Low Library administration building on March 27, 1968, the Columbia Administration placed on probation six anti-war Columbia student activists, who were collectively nicknamed "The IDA Six," for violating its ban on indoor demonstrations.

=== Morningside Park gymnasium ===
Columbia's plan to construct what activists described as a segregated gymnasium in city-owned Morningside Park fueled anger among the nearby Harlem community. Opposition began in 1965, during the mayoral campaign of John Lindsay, who opposed the project. By 1967, community opposition had become more militant. One of the causes for dispute was the gym's proposed design. Due to the topography of the area, Columbia's campus at Morningside Heights to the west was more than 100 feet (30 m) above the adjacent neighborhood of Harlem to the east. The proposed design would have an upper level to be used as a Columbia gym, and a lower level to be used as a community center.

By 1968, concerned students and community members saw the planned separate east and west entrances as an attempt to circumvent the Civil Rights Act of 1964, then a recent federal law that banned racially segregated facilities. In addition, others were concerned with the appropriation of land from a public park. Harlem activists opposed the construction because, despite being on public land and a park, Harlem residents would get only limited access to the facility. It was for these reasons that the project was labelled by some as "Gym Crow".

Since 1958 the university had evicted more than seven thousand Harlem residents from Columbia-controlled properties—85 percent of whom were African American or Puerto Rican. Many Harlem residents paid rent to the university.

Black students at a 40th anniversary event said their bitterness evolved from discrimination, that unlike white students their identifications were constantly checked, and that black women were told not to register for difficult courses. A "stacking system" that put all the former black football players in the same position was described.

== Protests ==
=== Occupation of Hamilton Hall ===
The first protest occurred in March 1968, eight days before the assassination of Martin Luther King, Jr. In response to Columbia's attempts to suppress anti-IDA student protests on its campus, and the university's plans for the Morningside Park gymnasium, which activists viewed as circumventing anti-segregation laws, Columbia SDS activists and Columbia's Student Afro Society (SAS) held a second, confrontational demonstration on April 23, 1968, at the university sundial. After the protest, Columbia and Barnard students were prevented from protesting inside Low Library by Columbia security guards. Most of the student protesters marched down to the Columbia gymnasium construction site in Morningside Park, attempted to stop construction of the gymnasium and began to struggle with the New York City Police officers who were guarding the construction site. The NYPD arrested one protester at the gym site. The SAS and SDS students then left the gym site at Morningside Park and returned to Columbia's campus, where they took over Hamilton Hall, a building housing both classrooms and the offices of the Columbia College Administration.

=== Activist separation ===
The morning after the initial takeover of Hamilton Hall, the 60 African-American students involved with the protest asked the predominantly white SDS students to leave. The SAS decision to separate themselves from SDS came as a surprise to the latter group's members. SAS wanted autonomy in what they were doing at that point in the protest, because their goals and methods diverged in significant ways from SDS.

While both the SAS and the SDS shared the goal of preventing the construction of the new gymnasium, the two groups held different agendas. The overarching goal of the SDS extended beyond the single issue of halting the construction of the gym. SDS wanted to mobilize the student population of Columbia to confront the university's support of the Vietnam War, while the SAS was primarily interested in stopping the university's encroachment of Harlem, through the construction of the gym.

It was of great importance to SAS that there was no destruction of files and personal property in faculty and administrative offices in Hamilton Hall, which would have reinforced negative stereotypes of black protesters destroying property. Having sole occupancy of Hamilton Hall allowed SAS to avoid any potential conflict with SDS about destruction of university property, as well as with other issues. Thus, the members of the SAS requested that the white students begin their own, separate protest so that the black students could put all of their focus into preventing the construction of the gym. The African-American students said that the European-American students could not understand the protest of the gymnasium as deeply, as its architectural plans were developed in a segregationist fashion. In addition, the African-American students knew that police would not be as violent against a group of black students, to prevent riots due to the fact that Martin Luther King Jr. had been killed three weeks prior.

What began as a unified effort would soon become a standoff between black students and white students as the SAS began to meet separately from other protesters and excluding whites, with each group occupying a separate side of the building. There was minimal communication between the SDS and SAS, which led to decreased solidarity between the two groups. This separation of the SDS and SAS, with each using different tactics to accomplish its goals, was consistent with the student movement across the country.

The SDS and the SAS soon made an agreement to separate white and black demonstrators. Soon after, the white students left Hamilton Hall and moved to Low Library, which housed the President's office. Over the next few days, the University President's office in Low Library (but not the remainder of the building) and three other buildings, including the School of Architecture, were also occupied by the student protesters. Not all occupiers were members of the university community. Many outside participants joined the protest, including students from other colleges.

In separating themselves from the white protesters early in the demonstration, the black protesters forced Columbia to address the issue of race. Falling so soon after the assassination of Martin Luther King Jr., which had caused riots in the black neighborhoods surrounding the university, the administrators were cautious in dealing with the demonstrators of the SAS. Officials feared that any use of force could incite riots in the neighboring Harlem community. Realizing this, the occupants of Hamilton Hall encouraged neighboring African-Americans to come to the campus and "recruited famous black militants to speak at their rallies". The student-community alliance that forged between students of the SAS and Harlem residents led to widespread growth in white support for the cause.

A photo of David Shapiro wearing sunglasses and smoking a cigar in Columbia President Grayson L. Kirk's office was published in the media. Mark Rudd announced that acting dean Henry S. Coleman would be held hostage until the group's demands were met. Though he was not in his office when the takeover was initiated, Coleman made his way into the building past protesters, went into his office and stated that "I have no control over the demands you are making, but I have no intention of meeting any demand under a situation such as this." Along with College administrators William Kahn and Dan Carlinsky, Coleman was detained as a hostage in his office as furniture was placed to keep him from leaving. He was provided with food and was released 24 hours later, with The New York Times describing his departure from the siege as "showing no sign that he had been unsettled by the experience"

=== Popular responses ===
According to "Crisis at Columbia: Report of the Fact-Finding Commission appointed to Investigate the Disturbances at Columbia University in April and May 1968":

"By its final days the revolt enjoyed both wide and deep support among the students and junior faculty...The grievances of the rebels were felt equally by a still larger number, probably a majority of the students...Support for the demonstrators rested upon broad discontent and widespread sympathy for their position."

However, this statement is problematic, as both WKCR and Spectator conducted polls during the event and immediately afterward, and found that while many students sympathized with many of the goals of the demonstration, a majority were opposed to the manner in which the protest was conducted.

A group of 300 undergraduates calling themselves the "Majority Coalition" organized after several days of the building occupation, in response to what they perceived as administration inaction. This group was made up of student athletes, fraternity members and members of the general undergraduate population, led by Richard Waselewsky and Richard Forzani. These students did not oppose the goals of the demonstrators, but were adamant in their opposition to the occupation of university buildings. The group formed a human blockade around the primary building, Low Library. Their stated mission was to allow anyone who wished to leave Low to do so, with no consequence. However, they also prevented any people or supplies from entering the building. On April 29, after three consecutive days of blockade, a group of protesters attempted on the afternoon to forcibly penetrate the line but were repulsed.

Fearing violence among students, the faculty committee persuaded the Coalition to abandon its blockade. The committee advised coalition leaders that the situation would be resolved by the next morning.

=== Suppression of protesters ===
The protests came to a conclusion in the early morning hours of April 30, 1968, when the NYPD violently quashed the demonstrations, with tear gas, and stormed both Hamilton Hall and the Low Library. Hamilton Hall was cleared peacefully as African-American lawyers were outside ready to represent SAS members in court and a tactical squad of African-American police officers with the NYPD led by Detective Sanford Garelick (the same investigator of the Malcolm X homicide) had cleared the African-American students out of Hamilton Hall. The buildings occupied by whites however were cleared violently as approximately 132 students, 4 faculty members and 12 police officers were injured, while over 700 protesters were arrested. Violence continued into the following day with students armed with sticks battling with officers. Frank Gucciardi, a 34-year-old police officer, was permanently disabled when a student jumped onto him from a second story window, breaking his back.

=== Second round of protests ===
More protesting Columbia and Barnard students were arrested and/or injured by New York City police during a second round of protests May 17–22, 1968, when community residents occupied a Columbia University-owned partially vacant apartment building at 618 West 114 Street to protest Columbia's expansion policies, and later when students re-occupied Hamilton Hall to protest Columbia's suspension of "The IDA Six." Before the night of May 22, 1968 was over, police had arrested another 177 students and beaten several students.

== Aftermath ==
=== Immediate responses ===
The protests achieved two of their stated goals. Columbia disaffiliated from the IDA and scrapped the plans for the controversial gym, building a subterranean physical fitness center under the north end of campus instead. A popular myth states that the gym's plans were eventually used by Princeton University for the expansion of its athletic facilities, but as Jadwin Gymnasium was already 50% complete by 1966 (when the Columbia gym was announced) this was clearly not correct.

At least 30 Columbia students were suspended by the administration as a result of the protests.

At the start of the protests, professor Carl Hovde served on a faculty group that established a joint committee composed of administrators, faculty and students that established recommendations for addressing disciplinary action for the students involved in the protests. Appointed as dean while the protests were continuing, Hovde stated that he felt that the "sit-ins and the demonstrations were not without cause" and opposed criminal charges being filed against the students by the university, though he did agree that the protesters "were acting with insufficient cause".

A number of the Class of '68 walked out of their graduation and held a counter-commencement on Low Plaza with a picnic following at Morningside Park, the place where the demonstrations began. The student demonstration that happened on Columbia's campus in 1968 proved that universities do not exist in a bubble and are, in fact, susceptible to the social and economic strife that surrounds them. These 1968 protests left Columbia University a much changed place, with, as historian Todd Gitlin describes, "growing militancy, growing isolation [and] growing hatred among the competing factions with their competing imaginations. The Columbia building occupations and accompanying demonstrations, in which several thousand people participated, paralyzed the operations of the whole university and became perhaps "the most powerful and effective student protest in modern American history," although it is arguable that the protests at UC Berkeley and Kent State had far more sweeping repercussions.

A wide variety of effects, both positive and negative, occurred in the wake of the demonstrations, but unfortunately for Columbia, they primarily affected enrollment and alumni donations. Additionally, the "growing militancy" Gitlin refers to peaked just a few years later, and while certain new loci of power came into being, in general campus life calmed down significantly. This is due in major part to the ending of the Vietnam War, which historians credit as the underlying and immediate cause of the majority of said movements. This excepts the Civil Rights Movement which was well under way prior to Vietnam. The two issues combined synergistically in the mid/late sixties.

Students involved in the protests continued their involvement in protest politics in varied forms affecting the movement at large. Their many activities included forming communes and creating urban social organizations. A faction of Columbia SDS, influenced by their alliance with the New York Black Panther Party, formed Weatherman.

Columbia became much more liberal in its policies as a result of the student demonstrations and classes were canceled for the rest of the week following the end of the protest. Additionally, a policy was soon established that allowed students to receive passing grades in all classes with no additional work for the remainder of the abridged semester. In the place of traditional class, students held "liberation classes, rallies, [and] concerts outside" which included appearances by Allen Ginsberg and the Grateful Dead. In order to play on 3 May 1968 on a closed campus, The Grateful Dead had to be "'smuggled' on campus to Low Library Plaza in the back of a bread delivery truck. Equipment and all. We were already jamming away before the security and police could stop us."

=== Cox Commission Report ===
The Cox Commission, organized at the behest of the executive committee of the faculty to investigate the protests, found in its report published later that year that channels of communication between the university's administration, faculty, and students were ineffective or lacking, and supported the idea of establishing a representative Columbia University Senate. In its study, the Cox Commission conducted 21 days of hearings in May 1968, hearing testimonies from 79 witnesses, and producing 3,790 pages of recorded transcripts. The Cox Commission Report was published in paperback on September 26, 1968.

=== Long term effects ===
Columbia suffered quite a bit in the aftermath of the student protest. Applications, endowments, and grants for the university declined significantly in the following years. "It took at least 20 years to fully recover." The protests left Columbia in a bad spot financially as many potential students chose to attend other universities and some alumni refused to donate any more to the school. Many believe that protest efforts at Columbia were also responsible for pushing higher education further toward the liberal left. These critics, such as Allan Bloom, a University of Chicago professor, believed, "American universities were no longer places of intellectual and academic debate, but rather places of 'political correctness' and liberalism."

Racial divisions had also been strengthened as a result of the protests, made worse by the separate deal that the administration, to prevent a riot in Harlem, made with the black students of the SAS who had occupied Hamilton Hall. These black activists were permitted to exit the building through tunnels before the New York Police Department came. Black students maintained their own separate organization with a particular agenda: to foster the relationship between Columbia and the Harlem community and modify the curriculum to include black studies courses.

A university senate was established as a result of the protests. This council, with representation from the faculty, administration and student population, gave students the opportunity to positively restructure the university. It was a way to produce positive dialogue between students and authority figures. From here on out, university administration would be attentive to student concerns about university policies. Another result of the protests was an improved relationship with the Harlem community. The university was forced to approach neighboring Harlem with a certain respect. Instead of continuing expansion north and east into Harlem, Columbia shifted its focus for expansion west to the Hudson Riverside Park area.

Columbia's relationship with the United States military and federal government was changed, a number of years in advance of similar changes for other schools. There would be no more federal sponsorship of classified weapons research and international studies that had been occurring since World War II, as Columbia severed ties to the Institute for Defense Analyses, which had been created in 1955 to foster the connection between Columbia University and the defense establishment. In addition, the ROTC left the Morningside Heights campus as CIA and armed forces recruiters. As a sign of changing times, however, Columbia announced early in 2013 a renewal of its historic ties to NROTC.

According to Stefan Bradley in his book Harlem vs. Columbia University: Black Student Power in the Late 1960s, through the results of the protests, the SAS showed that Black Power, which refers to the ability for African-American students and black working-class community members to work together despite class differences, on an issue affecting African-Americans, could succeed as it had done in the Columbia University protests of 1968.

== In popular culture ==
- The Strawberry Statement – by James Simon Kunen. This book details the particulars of the protest.
- The Strawberry Statement – film version of the above with less analysis.
- Columbia Revolt – 1968 documentary about the incident made by a collective of independent filmmakers.
- Across the Universe – by Julie Taymor.
- A Time to Stir – by Paul Cronin, a fifteen-hour documentary film (screened as work-in-progress at the Toronto International Film Festival in 2008).
- 4 3 2 1 – by Paul Auster. This book details the particulars of the protest.
- In 84 Charing Cross Road, protagonist Helene Hanff gets caught up in the protests.
- I ain't marchin' anymore - by Dotson Rader. This book contains an autobiographic account of the riots by the writer who was involved in them.

== See also ==
- A. Bruce Goldman
- Counterculture of the 1960s
- David Truman
- List of incidents of civil unrest in New York City
- Protests of 1968
- Silent Vigil at Duke University
- The Architect's Resistance
- Student activism at Columbia University
- List of incidents of civil unrest in the United States
- 2024 Columbia University protests
