= Jänken =

1970 film

- Directed by: Lars Lennart Forsberg
- Written by: Lars Lennart Forsberg; Märta Weiss
- Starring: Anita Ekström
- Cinematography: Petter Davidson
- Release date: 16 February 1970
- Running time: 95 minutes
- Country: Sweden
- Language: Swedish

Jänken is a 1970 Swedish drama film directed by Lars Lennart Forsberg. Anita Ekström won the award for Best Actress at the 7th Guldbagge Awards.

== Cast ==
- Anita Ekström as Inger
- Lars Green as Maskot
- Mona Dan-Bergman as Morsan
- Inger Ekström as Anita
- Gunnar Ossiander
- Louise Hedberg as Sylvia, Inger's sister
- Kay Sandberg as Maskot's friend
- Gunnar Carlsson as Maskot's friend
- May Dawson as Tyra
- Benny Hansson as Johnny
- Anna-Lisa Holstensson as Mrs. Larsson
- Åje Eriksson as Baker
- Tommy Sernling as Peter
