= Lars Lennart Forsberg =

Swedish film director

- Born: 31 July 1933; Stockholm, Sweden
- Died: 3 January 2012 (aged 78); Ystad, Sweden
- Occupations: Film director, screenwriter
- Years active: 1963-2005
- Children: Ebba Forsberg

Lars Lennart Forsberg (31 July 1933 – 3 January 2012) was a Swedish film director and screenwriter. At the 7th Guldbagge Awards his film Mistreatment won the awards for Best Film and Best Director. He directed 20 films between 1969 and 2005.

== Selected filmography ==
- Mistreatment (1969)
- Jänken (1970)
- Christopher's House (1979)
