= Gábor Harsányi =

Hungarian actor (born 1945)

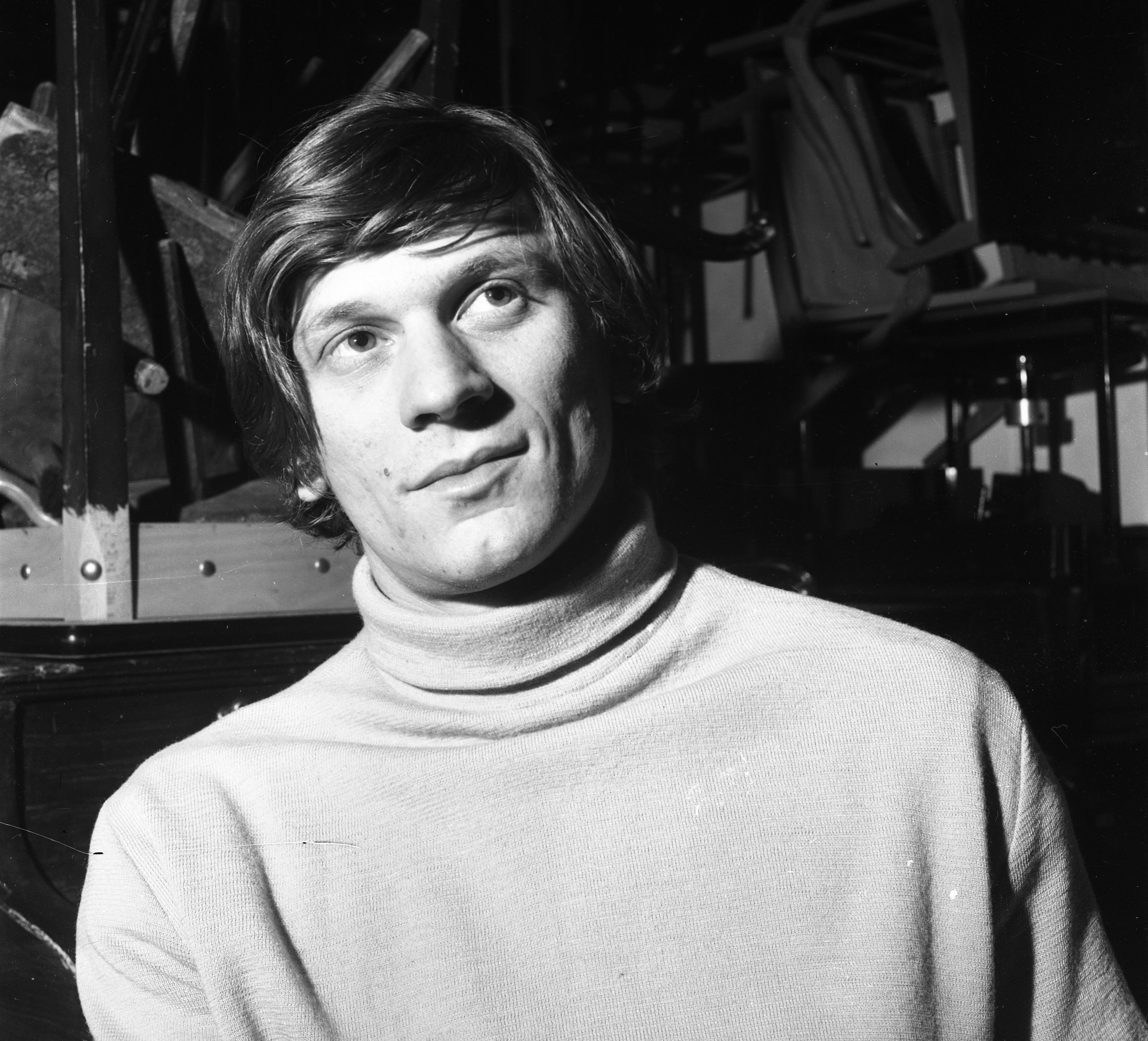
- Harsányi in 1971
- Born: 15 June 1945 (age 81); Budapest, Hungary

Gábor Harsányi (born 15 June 1945) is a Hungarian actor.

In 2009, he was chosen the "Outstanding Lead Actor" at the Midtown International Theatre Festival in New York. He was awarded the Kossuth Prize in 2021.

== Roles ==
- Kabarémúzeum (2006) – film
- South Park (2000–present) as Chef (Séf bácsi) – voice
- Rocko's Modern Life (1997) (Rocko) as Heffer Wolfe (Melák) – voice
- Animaniacs (1993–1998) as Dr. Otto Scratchansniff (Dr. Otto Agyalágy) – voice
- The Falcons (1970)
