= Believe in Me (Sloan song) =

Single by Sloan

from the album Parallel Play
- Released: 2008
- Genre: Rock
- Length: 3:17
- Label: Murderecords, Yep Roc Records
- Songwriter(s): Patrick Pentland, Sloan
- Producer(s): Nick Detoro, Sloan

Sloan singles chronology
"I've Gotta Try" (2007)	"Believe in Me" (2008)	"Witch's Wand" (2009)

Music video
- "Believe in Me" on YouTube

"Believe in Me" is a song by Canadian rock group Sloan, released as the first single from the band's ninth studio album, Parallel Play. The song peaked at No. 6 on Billboard's Canada Rock chart.

The song has been used in CBC shows and commercials and was featured in an opening montage of an episode of Hockey Night in Canada.
