= Mistreatment (film) =

1969 film

- Directed by: Lars Lennart Forsberg
- Starring: Knut Pettersen
- Release date: 6 November 1969
- Running time: 104 minutes
- Country: Sweden
- Language: Swedish

Mistreatment (Swedish: Misshandlingen, also known as Assault and Battery) is a 1969 Swedish drama film directed by Lars Lennart Forsberg. The film won the Guldbagge Award for Best Film and Forsberg won the Guldbagge Award for Best Director at the 7th Guldbagge Awards.

== Cast ==
- Knut Pettersen as Knut Nilssen
- Björn Granath as Björn
- Berit Persson as Berit
- Bjoern Kanvert as Dir Hedqvist
- Hans Hellberg as Author
