= Ian Freebairn-Smith =

American composer, arranger and conductor (1932–2025)

- Born: March 4, 1932; Seattle, Washington, U.S.
- Died: October 7, 2025 (aged 93); Folsom, California, U.S.
- Occupations: Musician; singer; composer; arranger
- Years active: 1960–?
- Known for: Charade (1963 film)
- Style: Classical; choral; popular; jazz
- Children: 4, including Vanessa

Ian Freebairn-Smith (March 4, 1932 – October 7, 2025) was an American composer, arranger, conductor and group singer in film and television.

== Early life and education ==
Ian Freebairn-Smith was born in Seattle on March 4, 1932. He began studying composition in high school. He attended the Los Angeles Conservatory of Music in Santa Clarita, California, the University of Pennsylvania in Philadelphia and the University of California, Los Angeles (UCLA). He later studied film scoring with Leith Stevens.

== Career ==
Freebairn-Smith began as a group singer with the California Dreamers and The Singers Incorporated, followed by choral arranging, orchestra arranging, and composing for motion pictures. He was instrumental in composing scores for The Muppet Movie and A Star is Born. He also wrote the score for The End, a film starring Burt Reynolds.

In 1977, he won a Grammy Award for Best Arrangement in accompanying a vocalist, for "Evergreen" sung by Barbra Streisand. He arranged and conducted for The Hi-Lo's, The Four Freshmen, Liza Minnelli, Frederica von Stade, Andy Williams, Anthony Newley, Stephen Bishop, Harry Nilsson, Phil Ochs, Paul Williams, Jeff Beck, and others. In April 2018, Freebairn-Smith taught a master class at Los Angeles Valley College in Valley Glen, a neighborhood of Los Angeles.

== Personal life ==
As of 2018, he was married to Shari Zippert with one daughter, Vanessa, who are both musicians in Los Angeles. He had three daughters from his first marriage, two of whom, Alison and Jennifer, are singer/songwriters.

Freebairn-Smith died in Folsom, California, on October 7, 2025, at the age of 93.
