= Student activism at Columbia University =

Columbia University in New York City, New York, has seen numerous instances of student protests, particularly beginning in the late 20th century.

== 1811 Riotous Commencement ==
The 1811 commencement was cancelled midway through its proceedings after graduating senior John B. Stevenson refused to make edits to a speech that advocated for more direct democracy in Republican governance. Stevenson was refused his diploma, and the students and the audience turned on the stage party, hissing and jeering at them. Police were called, Master of Arts degrees were not awarded, and the valedictory address was not given.

== 1936 protest against Nazis ==
On June 16, 1936, Robert Burke, or Bob Burke to friends, of the Columbia College class of 1938 was expelled and never readmitted for having led a mock book burning on the South Lawn on May 12 in protest of Columbia's friendly relationship with the Nazis. Nicholas Murray Butler, then university president, had accepted an invitation to attend an event at Heidelberg University with Joseph Goebbels. The student demonstrators burned works by Butler and a Manhattan phone book—"because it is full of Jewish names," declared one student. While the books were burning, Burke suggested that the crowd "go over to Butler’s house for tea and biscuits," rallying outside his mansion and taunting him. Butler sent Professor Arthur Remy, who then spent the summer touring Europe and especially Germany with his wife, to attend in his stead.

Dean Herbert Hawkes expelled Burke and he was not allowed to register for classes the following semester. Students supported by the American Student Union held pickets throughout the night outside Butler's residence, hundreds of students chanted "Butler wants Hitler, we want Burke," and chapters of the American Student Union and especially at universities around the country, especially City College of New York, adopted resolutions demanding Burke's reinstatement. Butler wrote that he was too busy to consider appeals for Burke's readmission. Burke then filed a lawsuit against Columbia claiming that his expulsion violated the rights and privileges granted to enrolled students that were accorded to him upon his admission. Columbia's lawyers built a case against Burke by attacking his character, citing clippings from the Spectator and legal trouble Burke had fallen into after expulsion. Burke's case was delayed for months and ultimately dismissed. He went on to lead 80,000 workers in the 1937 Little Steel Strike.

As of 2026, despite calls for Columbia to grant Burke an honorary degree and to address its warm relationship with Nazi Germany, the university has done neither. Among the graffiti left from the Basel Al-Araj Popular University occupation of Butler Library, which acting president Claire Shipman described as contrary to "Columbia's values," was a message written in green paint on a table in the library's Lawrence A. Wien reading room that "Butler was a Nazi."

== Protests of 1968 ==
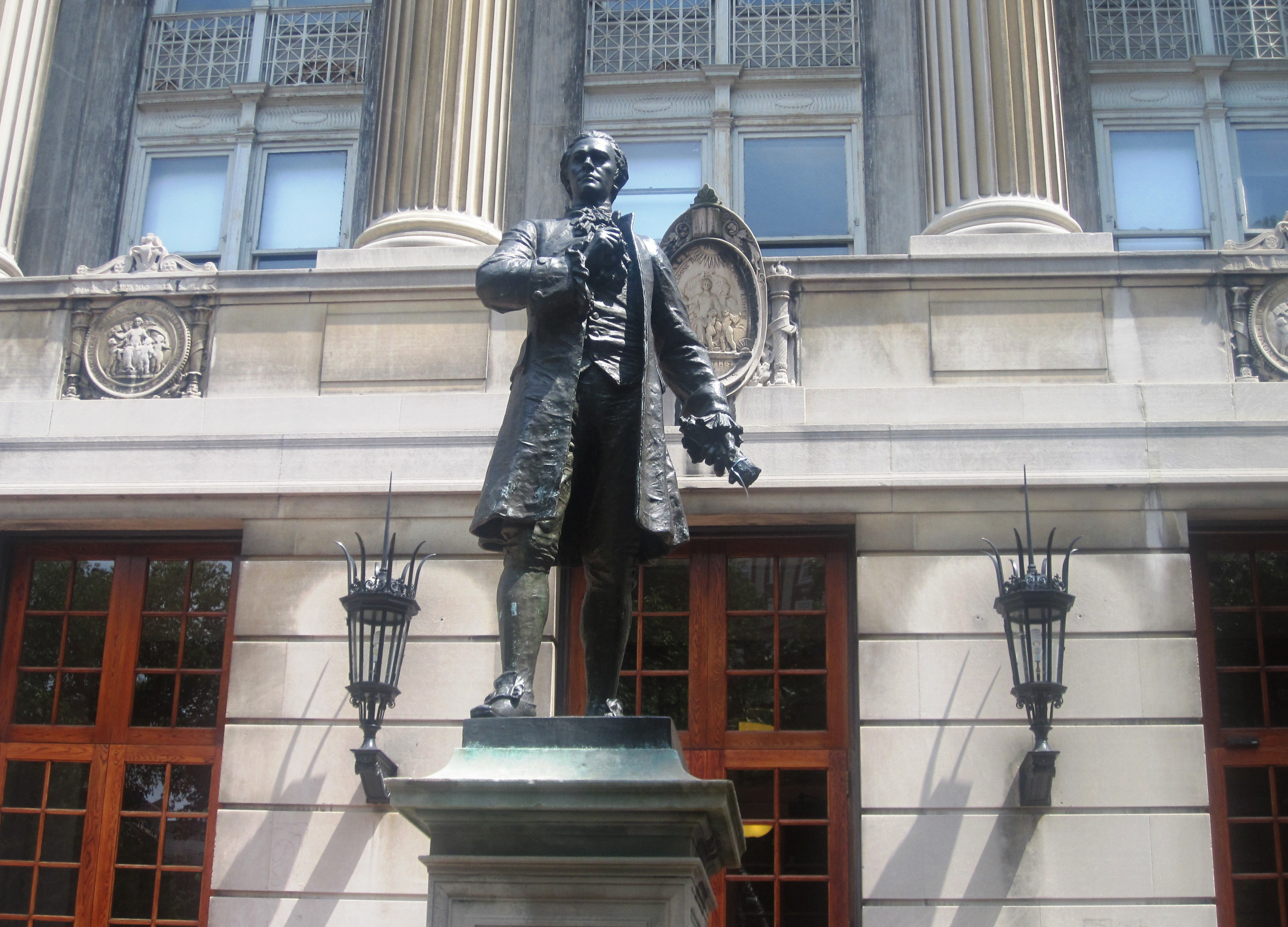
Hamilton Hall was occupied by protesting students in 1968.

Students initiated a major demonstration in 1968 over two main issues. The first was Columbia's proposed gymnasium in neighboring Morningside Park, perceived as a segregated facility, with limited access by the black residents of neighboring Harlem. A second issue was the Columbia administration's failure to resign its institutional membership in the Pentagon's weapons research think-tank, the Institute for Defense Analyses (IDA). Students barricaded themselves inside Low Library, Hamilton Hall, and several other university buildings during the protests, and New York City police were called onto the campus to arrest or forcibly remove the students.

The protests achieved two of their stated goals. Columbia disaffiliated from the IDA and scrapped the plans for the controversial gym, building a subterranean physical fitness center under the north end of campus instead. A popular myth states that the gym's plans were eventually used by Princeton University for the expansion of its athletic facilities, but as Jadwin Gymnasium was already 50% complete by 1966 (when the Columbia gym was announced) this was clearly not correct. At least 30 Columbia students were suspended by the administration as a result of the protests. Many of the Class of '68 walked out of their graduation and held a counter-commencement on Low Plaza with a picnic following at Morningside Park, the place where the protests began. The Strawberry Statement, a non-fiction book by a student activist, made a broader audience aware of the protests. The protests hurt Columbia financially as many potential students chose to attend other universities and some alumni refused to donate money to the school.

== Protests against racism and apartheid ==
Further student protests, including hunger strike and more barricades of Hamilton Hall and the Business School during the late 1970s and early 1980s, were aimed at convincing the university trustees to divest all of the university's investments in companies that were seen as active or tacit supporters of the apartheid regime in South Africa. A notable upsurge in the protests occurred in 1978, when following a celebration of the tenth anniversary of the student uprising in 1968, students marched and rallied in protest of university investments in South Africa. The Committee Against Investment in South Africa (CAISA) and numerous student groups including the Socialist Action Committee, the Black Student Organization and the Gay Students group joined together and succeeded in pressing for the first partial divestment of a U.S. university.

The initial (and partial) Columbia divestment focused largely on bonds and financial institutions directly involved with the South African regime. It followed a year-long campaign first initiated by students who had worked together to block the appointment of former United States Secretary of State Henry Kissinger to an endowed chair at the university in 1977.

Broadly backed by student groups and many faculty members the Committee Against Investment in South Africa held teach-ins and demonstrations through the year focused on the trustees ties to the corporations doing business with South Africa. Trustee meetings were picketed and interrupted by demonstrations culminating in May 1978 in the takeover of the Graduate School of Business.

== Columbia Unbecoming ==
In the early 2000s, professor Joseph Massad, held an elective course called Palestinian and Israeli Politics and Societies at Columbia. Students felt the views he espoused in the course were anti-Israel and some of them tried to disrupt his class and get him fired. In 2004, students got together with the pro-Israel campus group the David Project and produced a film called Columbia Unbecoming, accusing Massad and two other professors of intimidating or treating unfairly students with pro-Israel views. The film led to a committee being appointed by Bollinger which exonerated the professors in the spring of 2005. However, the committee's report criticized Columbia's inadequate grievance procedures.

== Ahmadinejad speech controversy ==
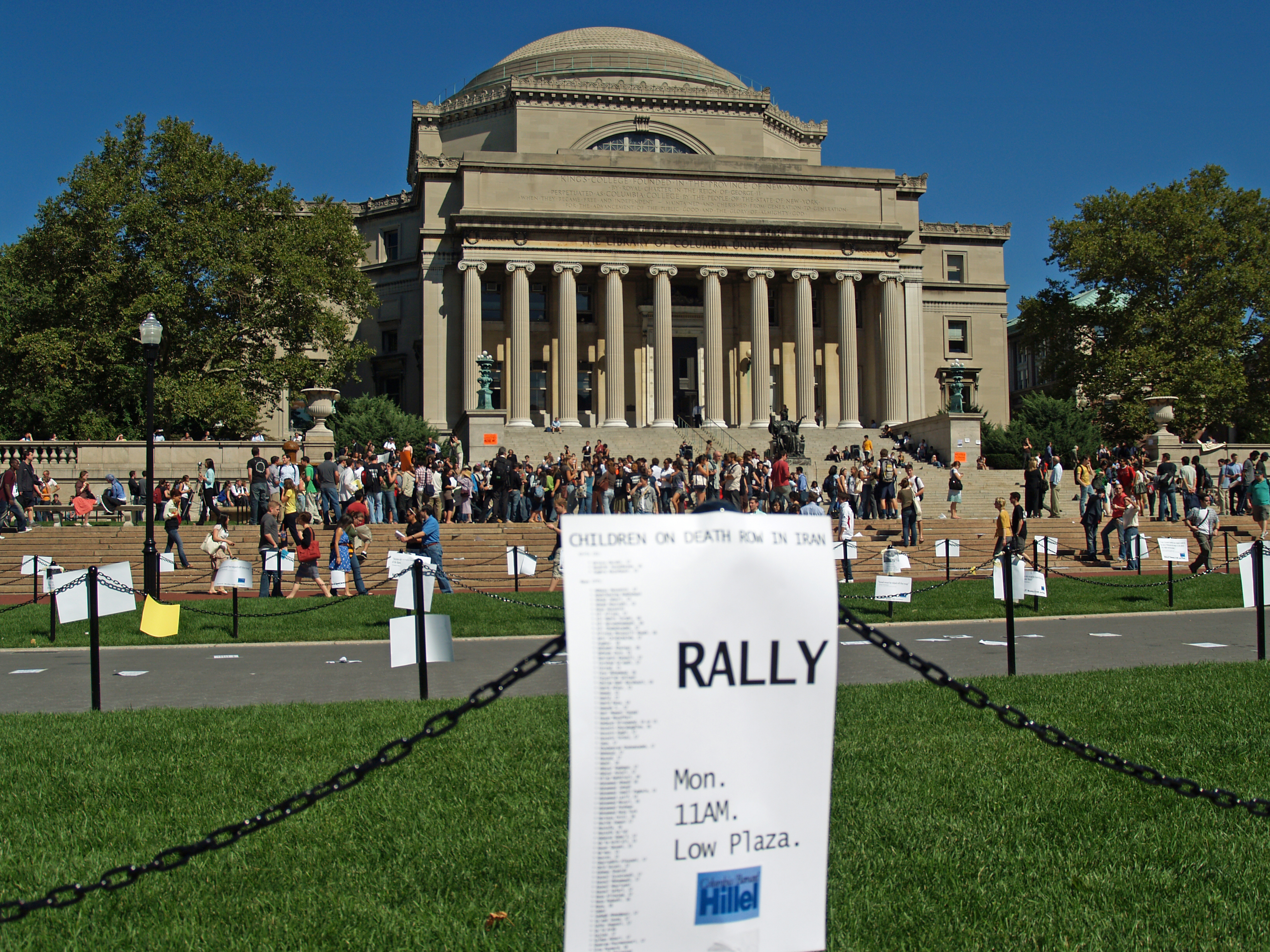
Students protest Ahmadinejad's invitation to speak at Columbia University.

The School of International and Public Affairs extends invitations to heads of state and heads of government who come to New York City for the opening of the fall session of the United Nations General Assembly. In 2007, Iranian President Mahmoud Ahmadinejad was one of those invited to speak on campus. Ahmadinejad accepted his invitation and spoke on September 24, 2007, as part of Columbia University's World Leaders Forum.

The invitation proved to be highly controversial. Hundreds of demonstrators swarmed the campus on September 24 and the speech itself was televised worldwide. University President Lee C. Bollinger tried to allay the controversy by letting Ahmadinejad speak, but with a negative introduction (given personally by Bollinger). This did not mollify those who were displeased with the fact that the Iranian leader had been invited onto the campus.

Columbia students, though, turned out en masse to listen to the speech on the South Lawn. An estimated 2,500 undergraduates and graduates came out for the historic occasion.

== ROTC controversy ==
Beginning in 1969, during the Vietnam War, the university did not allow the U.S. military to have Reserve Officers' Training Corps (ROTC) programs on campus, though Columbia students could participate in ROTC programs at other local colleges and universities. At a forum at the university during the 2008 presidential election campaign, both John McCain and Barack Obama said that the university should consider reinstating ROTC on campus. After the debate, the president of the university, Lee C. Bollinger, stated that he did not favor reinstating Columbia's ROTC program, because of the military's anti-gay policies. In November 2008, Columbia's undergraduate student body held a referendum on the question of whether or not to invite ROTC back to campus, and the students who voted were almost evenly divided on the issue. ROTC lost the vote (which would not have been binding on the administration, and did not include graduate students, faculty, or alumni) by a fraction of a percentage point.

In April 2010 during Admiral Mike Mullen's address at Columbia, President Lee C. Bollinger stated that the ROTC would be readmitted to campus if the admiral's plans for revoking the don't ask, don't tell policy were successful. In February 2011 during one of three town-hall meetings on the ROTC ban, former Army staff sergeant Anthony Maschek, a Purple Heart recipient for injuries sustained during his service in Iraq, was booed and hissed at by some students during his speech promoting the idea of allowing the ROTC on campus. In April 2011 the Columbia University Senate voted to welcome the ROTC program back on campus. Secretary of the Navy Ray Mabus and Columbia University President Lee C. Bollinger signed an agreement to reinstate Naval Reserve Officers Training Corps (NROTC) program at Columbia for the first time in more than 40 years on May 26, 2011. The agreement was signed at a ceremony on board the USS Iwo Jima, docked in New York for the Navy's annual Fleet Week.

== Divestment from private prisons ==
In February 2014, after learning that the university had over $10 million invested in the private prison industry, a group of students delivered a letter President Bollinger's office requesting a meeting and officially launching the Columbia Prison Divest (CPD) campaign. As of June 30, 2013, Columbia held investments in Corrections Corporation of America, the largest private prison company in the United States, as well as G4S, the largest multinational security firm in the world. Students demanded that the university divest these holdings from the industry and instate a ban on future investments in the private prison industry. Aligning themselves with the growing Black Lives Matter movement and in conversation with the heightened attention on race and the system of mass incarceration, CPD student activists hosted events to raise awareness of the issue and worked to involve large numbers of members of the Columbia and West Harlem community in campaign activities.

After eighteen months of student-driven organizing, the Board of Trustees of Columbia University voted to support the petition for divestment from private prison companies, which was confirmed to student leaders on June 22, 2015. The Columbia Prison Divest campaign was the first campaign to successfully get a U.S. university to divest from the private prison industry.

== 2021 tuition strike ==
In January 2021, more than 1000 Columbia University students initiated a tuition strike, demanding that the university lower its tuition rates by 10% amid financial burdens and the move to online classes prompted by the COVID-19 pandemic. Tuition for undergraduates was at the time $58,920 for an academic year, with the total cost eclipsing $80,000 when expenses including fees, room and board, books and travel were factored in. It was the largest tuition strike at an American university in nearly 50 years. Students stated they had won a number of concessions, as the university announced it would freeze tuition, suspend fees on late payments, increase spring financial aid and provide a limited amount of summer grants. A university spokesperson, however, stated that the decisions occurred several months prior to the strike.

Students also asked the university to end its expansion into and gentrification of West Harlem, defund its university police force, divest from its investments in oil and gas companies, and bargain in good faith with campus unions. The university in February 2021 announced that the Board of Trustees had finally formalized its commitment to divest from publicly traded oil and gas companies. The strike had been largely organized by the campus chapter of Young Democratic Socialists of America, which had partnered with other student groups to support the action.

== Graduate student labor strike ==
Starting in March 2021, members of the Student Workers of Columbia–United Auto Workers, a student employee union, began a strike over issues related to securing a labor contract with the university. The strike ended for a first time on May 13, 2021. Following the end of the strike, on July 3, new leaders for the union were elected who promised to continue to push for a labor contract with the university. A second strike began on November 3, 2021, and concluded on January 7, 2022.

== Protests during the Gaza genocide ==
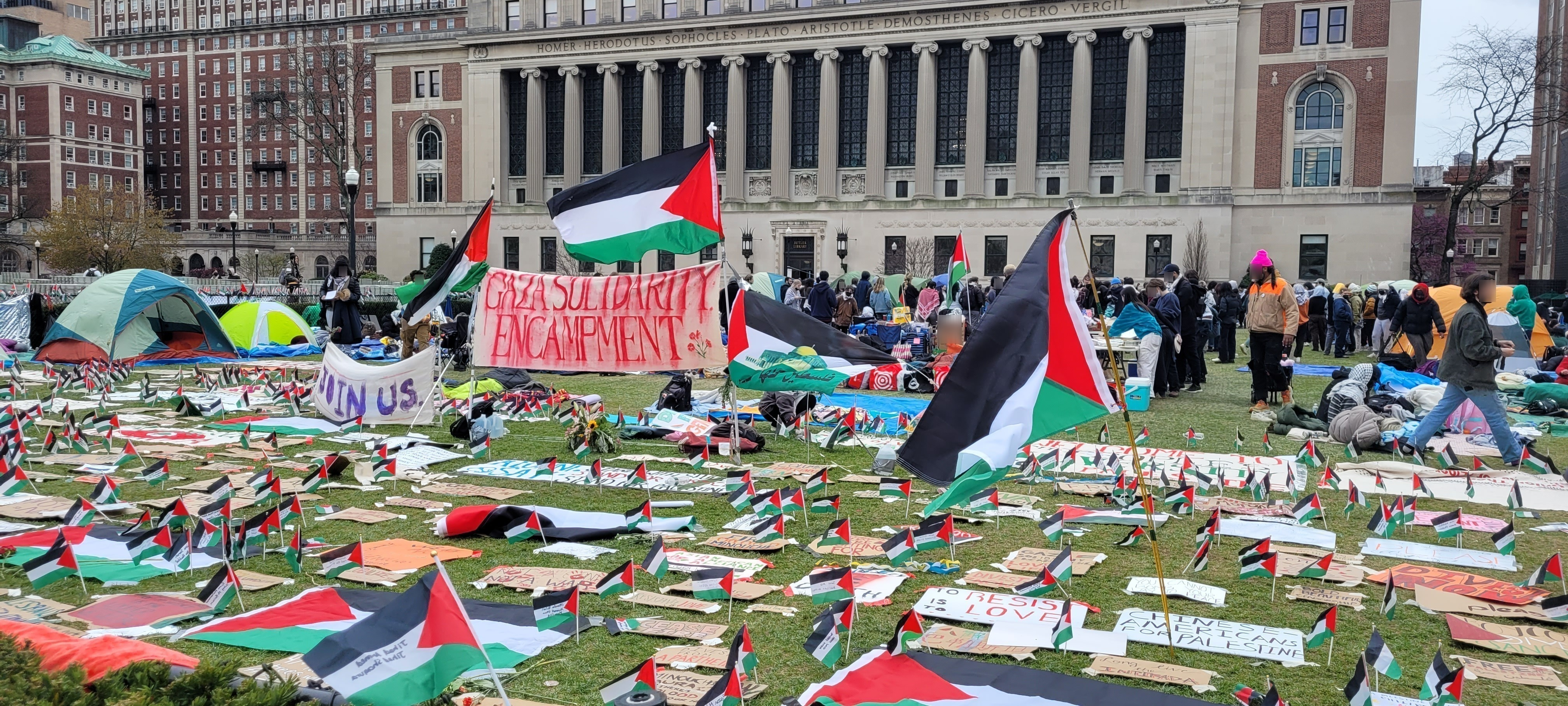
A scene of the reinstated campus encampment on April 21, 2024, several days after the NYPD arrested students and removed the first encampment.

A series of protests, encampments, and occupations at Columbia called on the university to divest from Israel during the war and genocide in Gaza.

Protests at Columbia began on October 12, 2023, and culminated in the Gaza Solidarity Encampment (April 17–30, 2024) and the Hind's Hall occupation of Hamilton Hall on April 30. On April 18, University President Minouche Shafik authorized New York Police Department to enter campus and remove protesting students in the encampment. However, the encampment was reestablished and the police action at Columbia University led to similar protests at other universities. On April 29, Shafik issued a statement saying that despite the protesters' demands, the university would not divest from Israel.

The encampments at Columbia led to the proliferation of Palestine solidarity encampments at over 180 universities around the world.
