= James Simon Kunen =

American author, journalist and lawyer (born 1948)

James Simon Kunen (born 1948) is an American author, journalist and lawyer. He is best known as the author of The Strawberry Statement, a first-person documentary of the Columbia University protests of 1968.

== Biography ==
James Simon Kunen is an alumnus of Fay School and Phillips Academy. He attended Columbia University during the 1968 student protests and participated in the student sit-in at the institution's Hamilton Hall, resulting in his arrest for trespassing. This experience led him to write The Strawberry Statement, documenting the university's controversial involvement with the government's Institute for Defense Analyses.

After graduating from Columbia in 1970, he became a field journalist from Vietnam for True. This experience led to Standard Operating Procedure, his second published work.

Afterward, he graduated from the New York University School of Law and moved to Washington, D.C., where he became a public defender. His experiences in criminal courts led to his writing How Can You Defend Those People?, published by Random House in 1983.

After leaving the Public Defender Service in Washington, Kunen worked as an editorial page editor at Newsday on Long Island before joining People as a writer and editor. His coverage for People of the worst drunk driving crash in the U.S. spurred him to write Reckless Disregard: Corporate Greed, Government Indifference and the Kentucky School Bus Crash, his fourth book.

Kunen has also written articles for The New Yorker, Newsday, and New York Times Magazine, and other notable publications.

After losing employment with Time Warner as a director of communications, having worked with the company for two decades, he wrote a book called Diary of a Company Man: Losing a Job: Finding Life, published in January 2012.

== Personal life ==
Kunen is married to Lisa Karlin, who is a radio journalist and social worker. They reside in Brooklyn, New York and have two children.

== Works ==
- The Strawberry Statement – Notes of a College Revolutionary (1968) ISBN 978-1881089520
- Standard Operating Procedure: Notes of a Draft-Age American (1971)
- "How Can You Defend Those People?": The Making of a Criminal Lawyer (1983) ISBN 978-0070356313
- Reckless Disregard: Corporate Greed, Government Indifference, and the Kentucky School Bus Crash (1994) ISBN 978-0671705336
- Diary of a Company Man: Losing a Job, Finding a Life (2012) ISBN 978-0762770458

== Sources ==
- Harper's
