= The Strawberry Statement =

1969 book by James Simon Kunen

- Author: James Simon Kunen
- Language: English
- Publisher: Random House
- Publication date: 1969
- Publication place: United States
- Media type: Print
- OCLC: 5595

The Strawberry Statement is a non-fiction book by James Simon Kunen, written when he was 19, which chronicled his experiences at Columbia University from 1966–1968, particularly the April 1968 protests and takeover of the office of the dean of Columbia by student protesters.

== Explanation of title ==
The book's title was a reference to a statement made by Herbert Deane, vice dean of Graduate Faculties, in an April 1967 interview with Columbia Daily Spectator, the student newspaper.

- "Whether students vote 'yes' or 'no' on a given issue means as much to me as if they were to tell me they like strawberries."

Speaking about the role of students in university policy, Deane said that "student or faculty opinion should not in itself have any influence on the formation of administrative policy". "A university is definitely not a democratic institution," he added. "When decisions begin to be made democratically around here, I will not be here any longer." Deane concluded with what students widely mocked as "the strawberry statement."

Deane frequently said that he had been misunderstood on the matter. In a 1988 interview with campus radio station WKCR, he said student opinions about university policy did matter to him, but if they were offered without reasoned explanations, then they meant no more to him than if a majority of students liked strawberries.

In 1970, a fictionalized version of the book was made into a comedy-drama movie set in San Francisco.

== See also ==
- Columbia University protests of 1968
- Morningside Park (New York City)
- Morningside Heights, Manhattan
