= The Flashing Lights =

Canadian alternative rock band

- Genres: Alternative rock
- Years active: 1990s-2000s
- Past members: Matt Murphy; Gavin Dianda; Henri Sangalang; Steve Pitkin

The Flashing Lights were a Canadian alternative rock band, active in the late 1990s and early 2000s.

== History ==
The Flashing Lights was founded by Matt Murphy, as a side project, performing around Halifax when Murphy was not performing and recording with the band The Super Friendz. The band primarily played as a cover band.

The Flashing Lights became Murphy's primary band following the Super Friendz' breakup in 1997. Murphy and bassist Henri Sangalang moved to Toronto, where they recruited Gaven Dianda on keyboards, tambourine and harmonica, and Steve Pitkin on drums.

The band performed in Toronto at the Horseshoe Tavern in March 1999, and shortly after released its debut album, Where the Change Is, in April 1999 on Halifax independent label Brobdingnagian Records, scoring a hit on modern rock radio stations in Canada with "Half the Time". The album's tracks were reminiscent of 1960s British rock. They followed up with the EP Elevature in 2000; Sangalang also appeared on Neko Case's album Furnace Room Lullaby the same year, and the band appeared at Edgefest on July 1.

The Flashing Lights' second album, Sweet Release, was released through Toronto's Outside Music in 2001 and was produced by Thrush Hermit's Ian McGettigan. Also in 2001, they performed in Montreal with Duotang and The Datsons.

The band subsequently went on hiatus; Murphy reunited the Super Friendz for their 2003 album Love Energy, and then took an acting role in the film The Life and Hard Times of Guy Terrifico. He later joined the now-defunct Toronto band City Field, is currently a member of Cookie Duster, contributed a song to the soundtrack for the 2009 film Defendor, and had a small acting role in the film Leslie, My Name Is Evil.

As of 2015, he has joined with Mike O'Neill of The Inbreds and Chris Murphy of Sloan in the supergroup Tuns.

Dianda currently plays with the band Saffron Sect, and Pitkin played with The Violet Archers and is currently a member of Elliott Brood.

In May 2023, at the Marquee Ballroom in Halifax, Sangalang joined on bass for a one-time mini-reunion of The Flashing Lights, performing the song "High School" with TUNS.

In April 2025, Sangalang passed away.

In March 2026, it was announced The Flashing Lights would perform two shows in June 2026, one in Toronto, and another in Halifax, in celebration of the reissue of Where The Change Is on Murderecords, with Chris Murphy handling bass duties.

== Discography ==
- Where the Change Is (1999)
- Elevature (2000, EP)
- Sweet Release (2001)
