= As the Poets Affirm =

Canadian independent rock band

- Origin: Ottawa, Ontario, Canada
- Genres: Post-rock, Chamber pop
- Years active: 2001–2007
- Labels: Zunior
- Members: Gary Udle; Nathan Gara; Ryan Patterson; Adam Saikaley; Alex Cairncross; Cindy Olberg; Kina De Grasse; Ben Belanger; Ryan Griffin; Renee Leduc; Gary Franks
- Website: www.asthepoetsaffirm.com

...As the Poets Affirm was a Canadian independent rock band formed in 2001 in Ottawa, Ontario. The band began as a three-piece acoustic project, and later evolved into a seven-member line-up experimenting with jazz, classical and electronica. Its name is taken from a line in Dante's Inferno. The original members were – Gary Udle (guitar, vocals), Nathan Gara (drums), Ryan Patterson (guitar, Pocket trumpet, vocals), Adam Saikaley (Moog synthesizer, organ, vocals), bassist and singer Alex Cairncross and cellist Cindy Olberg. They were occasionally joined by violinist Renée Leduc, bassist Ryan Griffin, keyboardist, cellist and singer Kina De Grasse Forney, and on guitar, keyboards and trumpet, Ben Belanger.

== History ==
In 2004, the band independently released two albums: I Want To Tell My Heart To You. But I Cannot Say English, and The Jaws That Bite, The Claws That Catch. It reached the top five in !earshot, Canada's national campus radio chart, in February 2005. The band has also received airplay on CBC Radio 3 and Brave New Waves.

...As the Poets Affirm then signed to Zunior, an online record label run by Dave Ullrich of The Inbreds. In 2006, they released the album Awake. They were also joined by Gary Franks, on synthesizer.

The group played with notable Canadian acts such as Destroyer, Rock Plaza Central, and Grizzly Bear.

...As the Poets Affirm disbanded in 2007 after playing Ottawa's Capital Idea! festival, and Ottawa Bluesfest, and recording a final album at Little Bullhorn Studios, which was not released. Saikaley, Gara and Patterson left to form the band Videotape.

In 2014, they independently released that last recording as The Pierre Richardson Album, with the lineup of Cairncross, Olberg, Gara, Patterson, Saikaley and Franks. The name of the album refers to the musician Pierre Richardson. An explanation for this was not provided.

== Discography ==
- I Want to Tell My Heart to You, but I Cannot Say English (2004), Independent
- The Jaws that Bite, the Claws that Catch (2004), Independent
- Awake (2006), Zunior
- The Pierre Richardson Album (2014), Independent
