= Mike O'Neill (musician) =

Canadian musician

- Origin: Oshawa, Ontario, Canada
- Genres: Indie rock, power pop
- Occupations: Musician, actor, songwriter
- Instruments: Guitar, bass guitar, vocals
- Years active: 1990–present

Mike O'Neill is a Canadian singer-songwriter, actor, and screenwriter. Originally from Oshawa, Ontario, he has been based in Halifax, Nova Scotia since 1996. O'Neill was a member of indie-rock band The Inbreds in the 1990s before disbanding the group and embarking on a solo career. He was involved as both sound engineer and actor on the popular Canadian television series Trailer Park Boys.

== Biography ==
O'Neill was a founding member in the 1990s of the Canadian indie-rock band The Inbreds along with the drummer Dave Ullrich. The Inbreds released four albums between 1992 and their breakup in 1998, and O'Neill has since released a handful of albums as a solo artist. Though he played bass guitar in The Inbreds, he has been predominantly a rhythm guitarist as a solo artist.

In 2007, he joined the cast of Trailer Park Boys, appearing in several episodes of the hit series' seventh season, playing the hot-tempered Thomas Collins. His song "Are We Waiting" was featured in the Trailer Park Boys season seven episode "Jump the Cheeseburger". He also worked behind the scenes on the series for several seasons as the sound mixer.

From 2007 to 2010, O'Neill composed music for the Food Network program French Food at Home, for which he won a Gemini Award.

On October 22, 2008, O'Neill and Ullrich played a one-off Inbreds reunion show in Halifax as part of the 2008 Halifax Pop Explosion.

In 2012, O'Neill released his first solo album in eight years, entitled Wild Lines.

The album Colours, a collaboration with Devon Sproule, was released on September 23, 2013, on Tin Angel Records.

O'Neill also collaborated with Trailer Park Boys creator Mike Clattenburg on the screenplays for the 2012 film Moving Day, and the 2014 film Trailer Park Boys: Don't Legalize It. They also co-created the Canadian television comedy series Crawford, which premieres as streaming video on February 2, 2018.

As of 2015, he has joined with Chris Murphy of Sloan and Matt Murphy of The Super Friendz in the supergroup Tuns.

== Discography ==
=== With the Inbreds ===
- 1992: Hilario
- 1994: Kombinator
- 1996: It's Sydney or the Bush
- 1998: Winning Hearts
- 2004: The Kombinator Demos
- 2004: B-Sides
- 2004: Live in Calgary 1997

=== With TUNS ===
- 2016: TUNS
- 2021: Duly Noted

=== Solo ===
- 2000: What Happens Now?
- 2004: The Owl
- 2012: Wild Lines
- 2013: Colours – with Devon Sproule

=== Compilations ===
- Our Power (2006): "She Believes in Me"
