= Give It Up (Hothouse Flowers song) =

Single by Hothouse Flowers

from the album Home
- Released: 26 April 1990
- Genre: Rock; Celtic rock
- Length: 3:31
- Label: London
- Songwriters: Liam Ó Maonlaí; Fiachna Ó Braonáin; Peter O'Toole; Leo Barnes; Jerry Fehily
- Producers: Clive Langer; Alan Winstanley

Hothouse Flowers singles chronology
"Don't Go" (1988)	"Give It Up" (1990)	"I Can See Clearly Now" (1990)

"Give It Up" is a single released by Irish rock group Hothouse Flowers from their second album Home. The song hit number two on the U.S. Modern Rock chart and number 30 on the UK Singles Chart.

== Charts ==
Chart (1990)	Peak position
Australia (ARIA)	53
Europe (Eurochart Hot 100)	70
Italy Airplay (Music & Media)	3
UK Singles (Official Charts)	30
