= The Secret Sessions =

2007 compilation album by various artists

Compilation album by Various artists
- Released: March 16, 2007
- Recorded: Early 2007
- Genre: Indie rock
- Label: Zunior
- Producer: various

The Secret Sessions is a tribute album to Canadian indie rock band Rheostatics, released March 16, 2007 through the web label Zunior. The album was released to coincide with the band's farewell show scheduled for March 30, and features Canadian indie rock artists performing Rheostatics songs.

The album was not publicized in advance, so that its release would be a surprise for the band — the album was presented to the band live on Dave Bookman's show on CFNY-FM on March 15.

Notably, the album includes reunion performances by three bands, Weeping Tile, Local Rabbits and The Inbreds, who were contemporaries of the Rheostatics in the 1990s Canadian indie rock scene, but had broken up prior to the album's release.

The album was made available as a limited edition CD release through Zunior, but was primarily distributed as a download from the label's website. Profits generated by the album were donated to charity.

== Track listing ==
1. The Weakerthans – "Bad Time to Be Poor"
2. Stephen Stanley and Carla MacNeil – "Take Me in Your Hand"
3. Weeping Tile with Chris Brown – "Public Square"
4. Wooden Stars – "Saskatchewan"
5. The Inbreds – "Dope Fiends and Boozehounds"
6. King Cobb Steelie – "Seven Stars Remix"
7. Barenaked Ladies with Tim Mech and Jason Plumb – "Legal Age Life at Variety Store"
8. The Golden Seals – "Loving Arms"
9. Cuff the Duke – "Claire"
10. Kate Fenner and Tony Scherr – "Stolen Car"
11. By Divine Right – "Shaved Head"
12. Dylan Hudecki – "Satan Is the Whistler"
13. Local Rabbits – "Record Body Count"
