= Winning Hearts =

1998 album by The Inbreds

Studio album by The Inbreds
- Released: February 10, 1998
- Genres: Indie rock, alternative rock
- Length: 34:00
- Label: Murderecords
- Producer: Dave Clark

The Inbreds chronology
It's Sydney or the Bush (1996)	Winning Hearts (1998)

Winning Hearts is the fourth and final studio album from Canadian alternative band The Inbreds, released on Murderecords in 1998. The album was noted for paring back the expanded "full band" sound the band explored on It's Sydney or the Bush, and returning to their more traditional bass guitar and drums configuration.

The album was mixed and recorded at The Gas Station, and mastered at Umbrella Sound in Toronto, Ontario. It held the number one spot on Chart Magazine's survey of Canadian campus radio for two consecutive months. However, after completing their tour to support the album, the duo decided to break up and pursue other projects.

The album was reissued on vinyl in 2016 by Label Obscura, alongside both It's Sydney or the Bush and Kombinator.

== Critical response ==
Jennifer Jones of AllMusic called it the band's best album, writing that "The songwriting has really reached its pinnacle, in that Halifaxian [sic] artist kind of way, and the polished mid-tempo numbers really speak to the listener. Granted, some songs are forgettable, but the ones that hit the mark do so with a bull's-eye." Writing for the St. Catharines Standard, John Crossingham opined that "If 1996's lush It's Sydney or the Bush was a rich piece of New York cheesecake with berries, Winning Hearts is a Mr. Big left out in the sun; chewy, crunchy and so sticky you'll be wearing it for weeks. Whichever confection you choose, The Inbreds are consistently Canada's biggest treat."

== Track listing ==
All tracks written by Mike O'Neill, except where noted.

No.	Title	Writer(s)	Length
1.	"Attitude"		3:14
2.	"Every Time I Turn Around"		2:32
3.	"Is It the Right Time"		2:30
4.	"Never Be the Same"		2:32
5.	"Get Along"		2:55
6.	"Moustache"		2:09
7.	"Take the Path"		2:15
8.	"Yelverton Hill"		2:41
9.	"This Train I Ride"		2:55
10.	"Sometimes"		3:53
11.	"The Runaround"	Mike O'Neill, Dave Ullrich	2:40
12.	"You Remain Unchanged"		2:33
13.	"White Caps"		3:51
14.	"Untitled (Hidden track on CD)"		0:05
Total length:			34:00
