= Tim Mech =

- Origin: Toronto, Ontario, Canada
- Genres: Blues; Hawaiian; Rock
- Occupation(s): Guitar technician, Guitarist
- Years active: 1996–2007, 2017-present
- Labels: DROG, Maple Music, Zunior
- Website: timmechspeepshow.com

Tim Mech is a Canadian rock guitarist and guitar technician. He is best known as a sometime collaborator with Rheostatics, for whom he was also a guitar tech for many years, starting around 1988. Starting around 1982, he was associated with Ottawa punk rock bands such as Civil Terror, Snuff Maximus and Deep Six. Mech later moved back to Toronto, his home town, forming The Bookmen with Dave Bookman, and working with Rheostatics. Mech is credited on Rheostatics' record Whale Music and was featured in their video for "Stolen Car".

Mech fronts his own band, Tim Mech's Peep-Show, in which he plays the Weissenborn Hawaiian slide guitar and sings. He is also the principal songwriter for the band. Tim Mech's Peep-Show has made two records, Cocktails in 2001 and Topless in 2004. In addition, the band was one of the winners of Musician magazine's "Best Unsigned Band Competition" in 1997. Mech was a featured guest musician on The Mike Bullard Show, sitting with the house band.

Mech joined Barenaked Ladies onstage playing the guitar solo (which he played on the original album version) for a live cover of Rheostatics' "Legal Age Life at Variety Store" for the 2007 Rheostatics tribute album The Secret Sessions.

Mech has been guitar tech for many notable artists, including Bob Mould, The Tragically Hip, Bruce Cockburn and Barenaked Ladies. From May 2011 to early 2019 he was the guitar tech for Elvis Costello. Tim started working with Carlos Santana in 2018 and has been his personal guitar technician since.

In early 2017, Tim Mech started songwriting once again for Tim Mech's PEEP-SHOW after the hiatus from performing.
