= Songs from the Rain =

Studio album by Hothouse Flowers
- Released: 1993
- Length: 51:51
- Label: London
- Producer: Stewart Levine

Hothouse Flowers chronology
Just a Note (1991)	Songs from the Rain (1993)	Born (1998)

Singles from Songs from the Rain
- 1. "An Emotional Time" Released: 1993; 2. "Thing of Beauty" Released: 1993; 3. "One Tongue" Released: 1993; 4. "Isn't It Amazing" Released: 1993; 5. "This Is It (Your Soul)" Released: 1993

Songs from the Rain is the third studio album by the Irish rock band Hothouse Flowers, released in 1993.

The album peaked at No. 7 on the UK Albums Chart and No. 1 on the Irish Albums Chart. The band promoted it by playing the Another Roadside Attraction festival, and then opening for Midnight Oil.

== Production ==
The album was produced by Stewart Levine. Two of its songs were cowritten with Dave Stewart; Will Jennings also contributed to Songs from the Rain.

== Critical reception ==
Professional ratings
Review scores
Source	Rating
AllMusic	3/5 stars
The Encyclopedia of Popular Music	3/5 stars
The Indianapolis Star	3.5/4 stars
Los Angeles Times	3/4 stars
The Philadelphia Inquirer	2/4 stars

Rolling Stone wrote: "Like Simple Minds, another spiritually inspired act that succumbed to bombast, Hothouse Flowers seem unsure how to express their religiosity without alienating a potential new audience." The Edmonton Journal determined that the album "captures the essence of contemporary Irish soul." The Chicago Tribune declared that the Hothouse Flowers prove that they remain "among the most emotional, compelling and imaginative of the new Celtic rock bands."

The Los Angeles Times concluded that "the best moments are disarming expressions of faith that are as mystical and spirit-lifting as the works of Van Morrison and the Waterboys." The Guardian noted that "the Flowers have begun mining a potentially rewarding vein of blues-gospel-folk-funk." The Philadelphia Inquirer lamented that "Celtic soul can be a mighty tepid cup of tea."

AllMusic wrote that "while Songs from the Rain is the band's most musically diverse collection, it is hampered by an inconsistent set of material." Hot Press' Pat Carty described the album as "one of the great Irish records".

== Track listing ==
All tracks are written by Hothouse Flowers, except where noted.

No.	Title	Writer(s)	Length
1.	"This Is It (Your Soul)"	Hothouse Flowers; Dave Stewart	3:52
2.	"One Tongue"		4:29
3.	"An Emotional Time"	Hothouse Flowers; Stewart	4:28
4.	"Be Good"		3:53
5.	"Good for You"		4:04
6.	"Isn't It Amazing"		5:50
7.	"Thing of Beauty"		5:27
8.	"Your Nature"		5:08
9.	"Spirit of the Land"		4:18
10.	"Gypsy Fair"	Hothouse Flowers; Will Jennings	3:50
11.	"Stand Beside Me"		6:32

=== 2025 expanded edition ===
Disc 1
No.	Title	Writer(s)	Length
12.	"An Emotional Time (Single Version)" (B-side to "An Emotional Time")	Hothouse Flowers; Stewart	3:47
13.	"Thing of Beauty (Edit)" (B-side to "Thing of Beauty")		3:55
14.	"One Tongue (Single Version)" (B-side to "One Tongue")		4:04
15.	"One Tongue (Remix)" (B-side to "Isn't It Amazing")		5:16

Disc 2
No.	Title	Writer(s)	Producer(s)	Length
1.	"The Seasons Wheels" (B-side to "An Emotional Time")	Hothouse Flowers; Mike Scott		5:26
2.	"Help Us Make Our Peace" (B-side to "An Emotional Time")		Hothouse Flowers	4:16
3.	"Song of Ecuador" (B-side to "An Emotional Time")		Hothouse Flowers	4:37
4.	"Air from the Hills" (B-side to "An Emotional Time")		Hothouse Flowers	3:36
5.	"Banished Misfortune" (B-side to "An Emotional Time")		Hothouse Flowers; Levine	2:23
6.	"Let the Rhythm Take You Home" (B-side to "An Emotional Time")	Liam Ó Maonlaí; Fiachna Ó Braonáin; Peter O'Toole; Jennings		3:19
7.	"Carry On" (B-side to "One Tongue")		Hothouse Flowers; Paul Barrett	3:28
8.	"Thank You for Believing" (B-side to "One Tongue")		Hothouse Flowers; Norman Verso	4:52
9.	"The Rebel" (B-side to "One Tongue")		Hothouse Flowers; Norman Verso	3:46
10.	"Same Song" (B-side to "One Tongue")		Hothouse Flowers; Barrett	4:02
11.	"Wish You Everything" (B-side to "One Tongue")		Hothouse Flowers; Verso	4:14
12.	"The Rain" (B-side to "One Tongue")		Hothouse Flowers; Verso	3:49
13.	"Of the People" (B-side to "Isn't It Amazing")		Hothouse Flowers; Verso	4:26
14.	"The Well" (B-side to "Isn't It Amazing")		Hothouse Flowers; Verso	5:20
15.	"Let Him Know" (B-side to "Isn't It Amazing")		Clive Langer	4:34
16.	"Getting Too Much" (B-side to "Isn't Amazing")			4:38
17.	"Suspicious Minds" (B-side to "This Is It (Your Soul)")	Mark James	Hothouse Flowers; Verso	5:34
18.	"Forever Young" (B-side to "This Is It (Your Soul)")	Bob Dylan	Hothouse Flowers; Verso	5:48

== Charts ==
Chart performance for Songs from the Rain
Chart (1993)	Peak position
Australian Albums (ARIA)	19
Canada Top Albums/CDs (RPM)	31
Dutch Albums (Album Top 100)	64
German Albums (Offizielle Top 100)	79
Irish Albums (IRMA)	1
New Zealand Albums (RMNZ)	22
Swedish Albums (Sverigetopplistan)	18
Swiss Albums (Schweizer Hitparade)	32
UK Albums (Official Charts)	7
US Billboard 200	156

== Certifications ==
Region	Certification	Certified units/sales
United Kingdom (BPI)	Silver	60,000^{^}
^{^} Shipments figures based on certification alone.
