= Home (Hothouse Flowers album) =

Studio album by Hothouse Flowers
- Released: 1990
- Genres: Rock; Celtic rock
- Length: 57:55
- Label: London
- Producer: various

Hothouse Flowers chronology
People (1988)	Home (1990)	Songs from the Rain (1993)

Singles from Home
- 1. "Give It Up" Released: April 1990; 2. "I Can See Clearly Now" Released: July 1990; 3. "Movies" Released: October 1990; 4. "Christchurch Bells" Released: February 1991; 5. "Hardstone City" Released: July 1991

Home is the second studio album by the Irish rock band Hothouse Flowers, released in 1990. It reached No. 5 on the UK Albums Chart and No. 1 on the Australian chart.

== Critical reception ==
Professional ratings
Review scores
Source	Rating
AllMusic	4/5 stars
Los Angeles Times	2.5/5 stars
Select	4/5
Smash Hits	5/10
Windsor Star	B+

The Los Angeles Times wrote that "the gospel-influenced rave-ups that punctuate the band's second album call into question how much soul it can squeeze from the boogie". The Windsor Star determined that the band "is best when it rams straight ahead on full-blown horn tunes, like 'Hardstone City' and 'Giving It All Away'".

Jonathan Lewis of AllMusic deemed Home an "underrated gem".

== Track listing ==
All tracks are written by Hothouse Flowers, except where noted.

No.	Title	Writer(s)	Producer(s)	Length
1.	"Hardstone City"		Hothouse Flowers; Norman Verso	3:45
2.	"Give It Up"		Clive Langer; Alan Winstanley	3:31
3.	"Christchurch Bells"		Gary Langan; Paul Barrett	3:51
4.	"Sweet Marie"		Steve Lipson	6:06
5.	"Giving It All Away"		Hothouse Flowers; Verso	3:49
6.	"Shut Up and Listen"		Barrett; Daniel Lanois	4:08
7.	"I Can See Clearly Now"	Johnny Nash	Lipson	4:53
8.	"Movies"		Langer; Winstanley	4:39
9.	"Eyes Wide Open"		Langer	3:15
10.	"Water"		Langer	4:10
11.	"Home"		Barrett	4:28
12.	"Trying to Get Through"		Hothouse Flowers; Verso; Barrett	4:24
13.	"Dance to the Storm"		Hothouse Flowers; Verso	4:13
14.	"Seoladh Na Ngamhna"	traditional	Hothouse Flowers; Verso	0:42

=== 2025 expanded edition ===
All tracks are written by and produced by Hothouse Flowers, except where noted.

Disc 1
No.	Title	Writer(s)	Producer(s)	Length
15.	"Give It Up (Edit)" (B-side to "Give It Up")		Langer; Winstanley	3:13
16.	"I Can See Clearly Now (Single Version)" (B-side to "I Can See Clearly Now")	Nash	Lipson	4:10
17.	"Movies (Single Version)" (B-side to "Movies")		Langer; Winstanley	3:54
18.	"Hardstone City (Short Version)" (B-side to "Hardstone City")		Hothouse Flowers; Verso	3:25
19.	"The Rose" (featuring the Dubliners)	Amanda McBroom	Eamonn Campbell	4:45

Disc 2
No.	Title	Writer(s)	Producer(s)	Length
1.	"If You're Happy (Live at the RDS Stadium, Dublin, 03/09/88)" (B-side to "Give It Up")	Liam Ó Maonlaí; Fiachna Ó Braonáin; Peter O'Toole		5:59
2.	"Bean Pháidín (Live at the RDS Stadium, Dublin, 03/09/88)" (B-side to "Give It Up")	traditional		1:23
3.	"If You Go (Live at the RDS Stadium, Dublin, 03/09/88)" (B-side to "Give It Up")	Ó Maonlaí; Ó Braonáin; O'Toole		8:27
4.	"Kansas City (Live)" (B-side to "I Can See Clearly Now")	Jerry Leiber; Mike Stoller		3:06
5.	"Better Days Ahead (Live)" (B-side to "I Can See Clearly Now")	Gil Scott-Heron		5:01
6.	"Strange Feeling (Live)" (B-side to "I Can See Clearly Now")	Tim Buckley		5:04
7.	"I Can See Clearly Now (Live at the Edinburgh Plyhouse 30/05/90)"	Nash	Hothouse Flowers; Verso	5:51
8.	"Eyes Wide Open (Live at the Edinburgh Plyhouse 30/05/90)"			3:56
9.	"Hardstone City (Live at the Edinburgh Plyhouse 30/05/90)"			3:58
10.	"Shut Up and Listen (Live at the RDS Stadium, Dublin, 03/09/88)"			6:09
11.	"Giving It All Away (Live, Australia, 1991)"			5:42
12.	"Hallelujah Jordan (Live, Australia, 1991)"	Ó Maonlaí; Ó Braonáin; O'Toole		4:32
13.	"Christchurch Bells (Live, Australia, 1991)"			5:39
14.	"Sí Do Mhamó Í (Live in Melbourne)"	Ó Maonlaí; Ó Braonáin; O'Toole; Dave Clarke		3:34

== Personnel ==
Hothouse Flowers

- Liam Ó Maonlaí – piano, lead vocals, Hammond organ, bodhrán
- Fiachna Ó Braonáin – electric and acoustic guitars, backing vocals, bass (6)
- Peter O'Toole – bouzouki, backing vocals, mandolin, bass
- Leo Barnes – saxophone, backing vocals, Hammond organ
- Jerry Fehily – drums, backing vocals, percussion, cymbal

Additional musicians

- Noel Eccles – percussion
- Daniel Lanois – dobro (6)
- Luís Jardim – percussion (9, 10)
- Claudia Fontaine – backing vocals (2, 10)
- Carol Kenyon, The Angelical Voice Choir – backing vocals (7)
- The Camden Kids – backing vocals (8)
- Phillip Pike – didgeridoo (10)
- Nawalifh Ali Khan – fiddle (10)
- Gavyn Wright, Wilf Gibson – violin (2, 8)
- Andrew Parker, Garfield Jackson – viola (2, 8)
- Helen Liebmann, Martin Loveday – cello (2, 8)
- Aisling Drury-Byrne, Dairine Ni Mheadra – cello (11)
- Steve Nieve – Hammond organ and piano (7), string arrangement (2, 8)

== Charts ==
=== Weekly charts ===
Chart (1990–91)	Peak position
Australian Albums (ARIA)	1
Canada Top Albums/CDs (RPM)	35
Dutch Albums (Album Top 100)	61
German Albums (Offizielle Top 100)	32
New Zealand Albums (RMNZ)	13
Swedish Albums (Sverigetopplistan)	11
Swiss Albums (Schweizer Hitparade)	21
UK Albums (Official Charts)	5
US Billboard 200	122

=== Year-end chart ===
Chart (1991)	Position
Australian Albums (ARIA)	20

== Certifications ==
Region	Certification	Certified units/sales
Australia (ARIA)	Platinum	70,000^{^}
United Kingdom (BPI)	Gold	100,000^{^}
^{^} Shipments figures based on certification alone.
