= Kombinator =

1994 album by The Inbreds

Studio album by The Inbreds
- Released: August 22, 1994
- Genre: Indie rock, alternative rock
- Label: PF Records
- Producer: Dave Clark

The Inbreds chronology
Hilario (1993)	Kombinator (1994)	It's Sydney or the Bush (1996)

Kombinator is an independently released studio album by Canadian alternative rock duo The Inbreds in 1994, produced by Dave Clark of Rheostatics.

Kombinator reached number one on the Canadian national campus radio charts and was nominated for a Juno Award in 1996 for Best Alternative Album.

Professional ratings
Review scores
Source	Rating
Allmusic	4.5/5 stars

The single "Any Sense of Time" received a MuchMusic Video Award nomination for Best Alternative Video.

Kombinator received a 1997 re-release on Sloan's Murderecords. It was reissued on vinyl in 2016 by Label Obscura, alongside both of the band's later albums It's Sydney or the Bush and Winning Hearts.

== Track listing ==
No.	Title	Writer(s)	Length
1.	"Kombinator"	The Inbreds	3:25
2.	"Round 12"	The Inbreds	3:00
3.	"You Will Know"	The Inbreds	2:55
4.	"Any Sense of Time"	The Inbreds	3:42
5.	"Turn My Head"	The Inbreds	3:28
6.	"Dale Says"	The Inbreds	0:16
7.	"She's Acting"	The Inbreds	2:08
8.	"Scratch"	The Inbreds	2:17
9.	"Link"	The Inbreds	2:45
10.	"Dangerous"	The Inbreds	4:12
11.	"Don't Try So Hard"	The Inbreds	5:39
12.	"Cruise Control"	The Inbreds	2:33
13.	"Last Flight"	The Inbreds	3:18
14.	"Amelia Earhart"	The Inbreds	3:15

== Personnel ==
- Mike O'Neill – Vocals, bass, guitar, cello, piano, tambourine
- Dave Ullrich – Drums, tambourine, xylophone, bass on "She's Acting"
- Dave Clark – producer, tambourine, drums on "She's Acting"
- Dale Morningstar – Engineer
- Lewis Melville – Engineer

== Trivia ==
- The track "Any Sense of Time" appeared in the 6th-season finale of the Canadian mockumentary series Trailer Park Boys.
