= Golden Seals =

Golden Seals can refer to:

- California Golden Seals, a professional hockey team
  - San Francisco Seals (ice hockey), an earlier iteration of that team
- Columbus Golden Seals, a minor league hockey team
- The Golden Seals, a Canadian indie rock band

== See also ==
- The Golden Seal, a 1983 film
- Goldenseal, a perennial herb
