= People (Hothouse Flowers album) =

Studio album by Hothouse Flowers
- Released: 1988
- Genres: Rock; Celtic rock
- Length: 43:46
- Label: London
- Producers: Clive Langer; Alan Winstanley

Hothouse Flowers chronology
| People (1988) | Home (1990) |

Singles from People
- 1. "Love Don't Work This Way" Released: May 1987; 2. "Don't Go" Released: September 1987; 3. "Feet on the Ground" Released: March 1988; 4. "I'm Sorry" Released: July 1988; 5. "It'll Be Easier in the Morning" Released: September 1988

People is the debut studio album by Irish rock group Hothouse Flowers, released in 1988. It was produced by Clive Langer and Alan Winstanley.

== Critical reception ==
Professional ratings
Review scores
| Source | Rating |
|---|---|
| AllMusic | 4.5/5 stars |

The Boston Globe opined that "there's an optimism and warmth in their music, and it doesn't sound glib or patronizing." The Washington Post concluded that "the driving, often joyous music of [some] songs promises much, but such lyrics warn that Hothouse Flowers could bloom into a major annoyance."

== Track listing ==
All tracks are written by Liam Ó Maonlaí, Fiachna Ó Braonáin and Peter O'Toole, except where noted.

| No. | Title | Writer(s) | Length |
|---|---|---|---|
| 1. | "I'm Sorry" | | 3:36 |
| 2. | "Don't Go" | | 3:48 |
| 3. | "Forgiven" | | 3:21 |
| 4. | "It'll Be Easier in the Morning" | | 3:35 |
| 5. | "Hallelujah Jordan" | | 3:06 |
| 6. | "If You Go" | | 5:03 |
| 7. | "The Older We Get" | | 4:45 |
| 8. | "Yes I Was" | | 3:14 |
| 9. | "Love Don't Work This Way" | Ó Maonlaí; Ó Braonáin; O'Toole; Leo Barnes; Jerry Fehily | 3:43 |
| 10. | "Ballad of Katie" | | 6:09 |
| 11. | "Feet on the Ground" | | 3:26 |
| 12. | "Lonely Lane" (Only available on CD) | | 4:22 |
| 13. | "Saved" (Only available on CD) | | 3:35 |

=== 2025 expanded edition ===
Disc 1
| No. | Title | Producer(s) | Length |
|---|---|---|---|
| 14. | "Don't Go (Single Version)" (B-side to "Don't Go") | | 3:30 |
| 15. | "Better and Better" (B-side to "Don't Go") | Hothouse Flowers; Pat McCarthy | 4:28 |
| 16. | "Don't Go (Live Acoustic Version)" (B-side to "Don't Go") | Nick Garside | 4:02 |
| 17. | "Big Fat Heart" (B-side to "Don't Go") | Hothouse Flowers; McCarthy | 3:22 |
| 18. | "Hydroman" (B-side to "Don't Go") | | 4:51 |

Disc 2
| No. | Title | Writer(s) | Producer(s) | Length |
|---|---|---|---|---|
| 1. | "Don't Go (Extended Version)" (B-side to "Don't Go") | | | 6:30 |
| 2. | "Feet on the Ground (Extended Version)" (B-side to "Feet on the Ground") | | | 6:38 |
| 3. | "Hard Rain" (B-side to "Feet on the Ground") | | Hothouse Flowers | 4:01 |
| 4. | "Strange Feeling" (B-side to "Feet on the Ground") | Tim Buckley | Hothouse Flowers | 4:43 |
| 5. | "Carrickfergus" (B-side to "It'll Be Easier in the Morning") | traditional | Hothouse Flowers; Norman Verso | 4:24 |
| 6. | "Seeline Woman" (B-side to "Love Don't Work This Way") | George Houston Bass | | 4:32 |
| 7. | "Mountains" (B-side to "I'm Sorry") | | Hothouse Flowers; Verso | 2:43 |
| 8. | "Love Don't Work This Way (Live, International, Manchester, June 1988)" | Ó Maonlaí; Ó Braonáin; O'Toole; Barnes; Fehily | | 4:23 |
| 9. | "The Older We Get (Live, International, Manchester, June 1988)" | | | 4:52 |
| 10. | "Yes I Was (Live, International, Manchester, June 1988)" | | | 3:22 |
| 11. | "If You're Happy (Live, International, Manchester, June 1988)" | | | 5:26 |
| 12. | "Hydroman (Live in Berlin, 1987)" | | | 5:32 |
| 13. | "Freedom (Live in Berlin, 1987)" | Ó Maonlaí; Ó Braonáin; O'Toole; Barnes; Fehily | | 4:40 |
| 14. | "Willy (Live in Berlin, 1987)" | Ó Maonlaí; Ó Braonáin | | 3:35 |
| 15. | "Hard Rain (Live in Berlin, 1987)" | | | 4:28 |
| 16. | "Don't Go (Live in Berlin, 1987)" | | | 4:14 |

== Personnel ==
Hothouse Flowers

- Liam Ó Maonlaí – piano, lead vocals, Hammond organ, harmonica, bodhrán, vibraphone, marimba
- Fiachna Ó Braonáin – electric and acoustic guitars, backing vocals, electric sitar
- Peter O'Toole – bass, backing vocals, electric guitar, mandolin, bouzouki
- Leo Barnes – saxophone, backing vocals
- Jerry Fehily – drums, percussion

Additional musicians

- Claudia Fontaine – backing vocals (1, 3–5, 8)
- Jimmy Chambers – backing vocals (2, 9, 11)
- Jimmy Helms – backing vocals (2, 9, 11)
- Alicia Previn (aka. Lovely Previn) – electric fiddle (4)
- Luís Jardim – percussion

== Charts ==
=== Weekly charts ===
| Chart (1988–89) | Peak position |
|---|---|
| Austrian Albums (Ö3 Austria) | 20 |
| Australian Albums (ARIA) | 30 |
| Canada Top Albums/CDs (RPM) | 28 |
| German Albums (Offizielle Top 100) | 32 |
| Dutch Albums (Album Top 100) | 47 |
| New Zealand Albums (RMNZ) | 6 |
| Norwegian Albums (VG-lista) | 11 |
| Swedish Albums (Sverigetopplistan) | 11 |
| Swiss Albums (Schweizer Hitparade) | 21 |
| UK Albums (Official Charts) | 2 |
| US Billboard 200 | 88 |

== Certifications ==
| Region | Certification | Certified units/sales |
|---|---|---|
| Canada (Music Canada) | Gold | 50,000^{^} |
| New Zealand (RMNZ) | Gold | 7,500^{^} |
| United Kingdom (BPI) | Gold | 100,000^{^} |
^{^} Shipments figures based on certification alone.
