= Land (song) =

1994 popular music single

Single by Midnight Oil, Daniel Lanois, Hothouse Flowers, Crash Vegas, The Tragically Hip
- Released: 1994
- Recorded: 1993
- Length: 5:39
- Label: Cargo
- Songwriters: Gord Downie; Peter Garrett; Daniel Lanois; Liam Ó Maonlaí
- Producer: Daniel Lanois

Midnight Oil singles chronology
"Outbreak of Love" (1993)	"Land" (1994)	"Underwater" (1996)

"Land" is a one-off charity single credited to Midnight Oil, Daniel Lanois, Hothouse Flowers, Crash Vegas, and the Tragically Hip. It was recorded in 1993 and released in Canada in 1994 on Cargo Records, and in Australia in January 1995 on Columbia Records.

All five artists were part of 1993's Another Roadside Attraction tour.

The song protests the logging industry practice of clearcutting in the rainforests of British Columbia, particularly in Clayoquot Sound.

== Track listing ==
1. "Introduction" - 0:34
2. "Land" (single version) - 5:39
3. "Land" (full length version) - 6:16

== Charts ==
Chart performance for "Land"
Chart (1995)	Peak position
Australia (ARIA)	63
