= The Super Friendz =

Canadian indie rock band

- Origin: Halifax, Nova Scotia, Canada
- Genres: Indie rock, power pop
- Years active: 1994–1997, 2002–2004, 2006, 2009, 2012–2014.
- Label: Murderecords
- Members: Drew Yamada; Charles Austin; Matt Murphy; Dave Marshal
- Past members: Chris Murphy; Cliff Gibb; Lonnie James
- Website: thesuperfriendz.bandcamp.com

The Super Friendz are a Canadian indie rock band from Halifax, Nova Scotia. They were initially active between 1994 and 1997, before reforming in 2002, with sporadic activity since then.

Contemporaries of Sloan, their early work was on Sloan's Murderecords label.

== Career ==
The Super Friendz were formed in 1994 by three King's College students Charles Austin (vocals and bass), Matt Murphy (vocals and guitar), Drew Yamada (vocals and guitar). Until 1996, the band had no permanent drummer, at various times Chris Murphy (no relation to Matt) of Sloan, Cliff Gibb of Thrush Hermit, and Dave Marsh filled the role until Lonnie James was chosen as a permanent member.

In 1994, The Super Friendz released the cassette Sticktoitiveness independently, and the single "By Request" on Murderecords, and later toured Canada with Sloan.

The band's first album, Mock Up, Scale Down was released on Murderecords on July 14, 1995. The singles "10 lbs.", "Karate Man", and "Rescue Us from Boredom" were released from the album, which was a Juno Award nominee for Alternative Album of the Year at the Juno Awards of 1996.

In 1996, the band contributed the song "Blue Tattoo" to the compilation album A Tribute to Hard Core Logo. On July 23, 1996, the band released the EP Play the Game, Not Games on Murderecords. The songs on Play the Game—especially the contributions of Austin and Yamada—were significantly more experimental than on the album.

The band's second album, Slide Show, was released on February 25, 1997. Critical response to the album was highly favorable, although some identified signs of creative tension in the album's diverse array of styles.

On May 23, 1997, a compilation album of sorts was released for the United States market on March Records. It was titled, confusingly, Sticktoitiveness, but rather than the 1994 cassette, it contained new mixes of most songs on Mock Up, Scale Down and five from Play The Game, Not Games.

By August 1997, the band had broken up.

== Post-breakup ==
Matt Murphy later re-emerged with a new band called The Flashing Lights. He has also played with the bands City Field and Cookie Duster, and starred in the film The Life and Hard Times of Guy Terrifico. In 2015, he formed a new band, TUNS, with Chris Murphy and Mike O'Neill.

Austin and Yamada launched the project Neuseiland with Joel Plaskett, then of Thrush Hermit. Austin is now a recording engineer and producer in Halifax, and has contributed to albums by Buck 65, Matt Mays, Joel Plaskett, Garrett Mason, and many others. Yamada later toured with O'Neill and others, before leaving the music industry full-time to pursue post-secondary education. James went on to release two critically acclaimed solo records on Teenage USA, as well as recording and touring as a drummer in Royal City.

== Reunion (2002–present) ==
In late December 2002, the Super Friendz came back together for a special holiday reunion. The band recorded a reunion album, Love Energy, which was released June 30, 2003, on Outside Music. A small tour followed that September. Dave Marsh has been the band's drummer from the 2002 reunion to present.

In early 2006, a fourth studio album was self-produced, with the working title of Mick Mojo McKinzey Skunk but it has yet to be released. Song titles included "Altamont," "Every Year," "Home Again," "Shannon Park," "Local Heroes," and "Majesty of Rock."

Between the years of 2012 to 2014, the band has performed at such music festivals as the 2012 Halifax Pop Explosion, North by Northeast 2013, and Hillside Music Festival.

The original cassette Sticktoitiveness was remastered and released as a CD in March 2006. Mock Up, Scale Down was reissued on Murderecords on vinyl as a 2×LP in 2013.

In May 2026, Chris Murphy of Sloan, released a limited edition LP of collected early works by The Superfriendz, titled 1994 – The Early Recordings, on Murderecords, in support of their annual Garage Sale.

== Discography ==
- Sticktoitiveness (1994)
- Mock Up, Scale Down (1995)
- Play the Game not Games E.P. (1996)
- Slide Show (1997)
- LoveEnergy (2003)
- 1994 – The Early Recordings (2026)
