= Michael Mabbott =

Canadian film and television director and writer

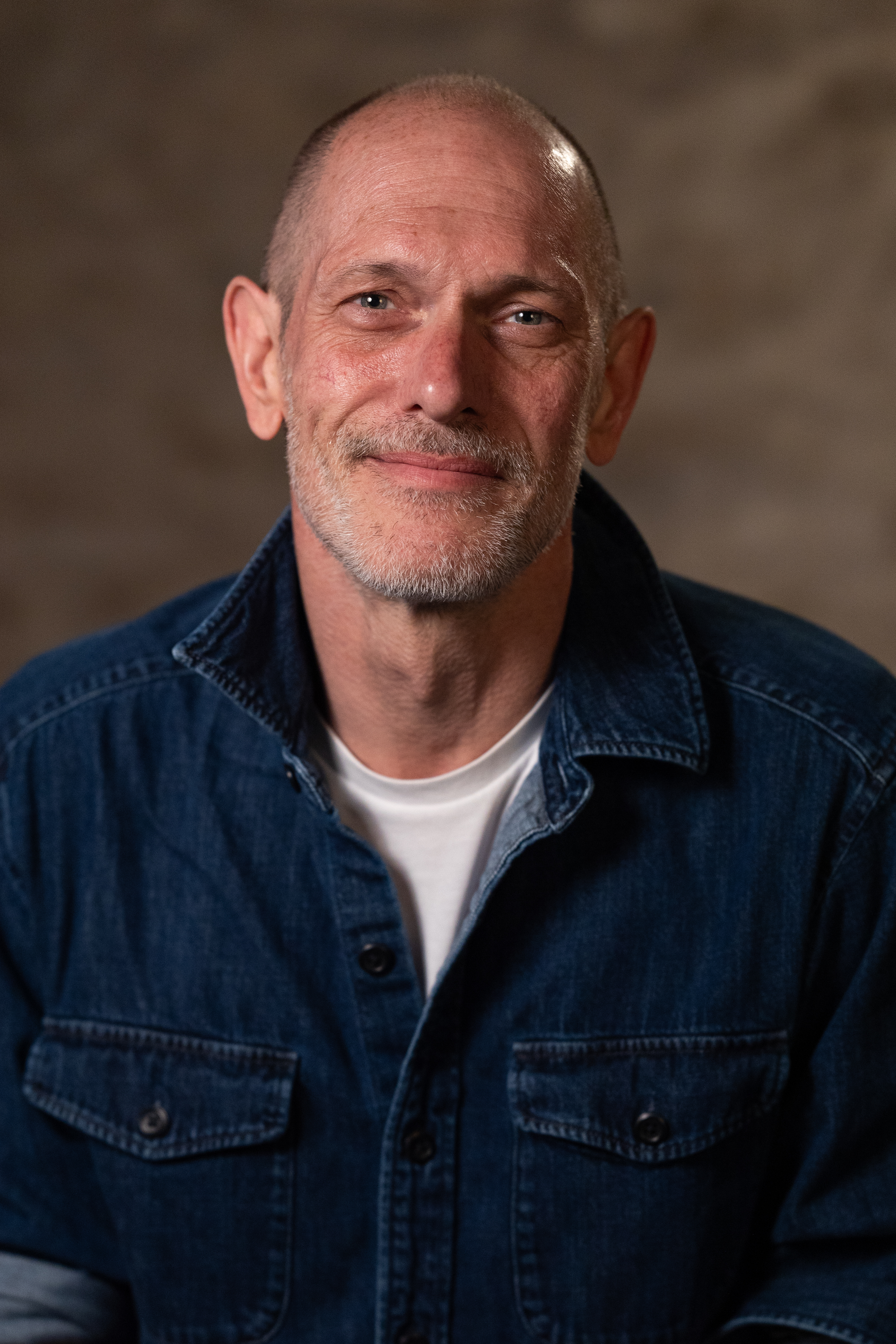
- Born: 1973 (age 52–53); Edmonton, Alberta
- Occupations: Film and television director, screenwriter
- Years active: 2000s–present
- Notable work: The Life and Hard Times of Guy Terrifico, The Yard, Any Other Way: The Jackie Shane Story
- Spouse: Tassie Cameron

Michael Mabbott (born 1973) is a Canadian film and television director and writer. He is best known for his debut feature film as a director, The Life and Hard Times of Guy Terrifico, which won the Toronto International Film Festival Award for Best Canadian First Feature Film at the 2005 Toronto International Film Festival.

Mabbott and the film's star, musician Matt Murphy, received two Genie Award nominations for Best Original Song at the 26th Genie Awards in 2006 for the songs "Just a Show" and "Make Believe". He wrote several other songs for the film, and also contributed the song "Let's Make Love Again" to the 2009 film Defendor.

Mabbott's second feature film, Citizen Duane, was released in 2006.

He subsequently directed episodes of the television series Life with Derek, Wingin' It, Overruled! and Baxter before co-creating, with writer David Eddie, the six-episode series The Yard, which aired on HBO Canada in 2011.

In 2024, Mabbott and Lucah Rosenberg-Lee released the documentary film Any Other Way: The Jackie Shane Story.

He has been in a long-term relationship with television writer and producer Tassie Cameron, with whom he collaborated on the television pilot Adele's Hotel.
