= Hothouse Flowers =

Irish rock band

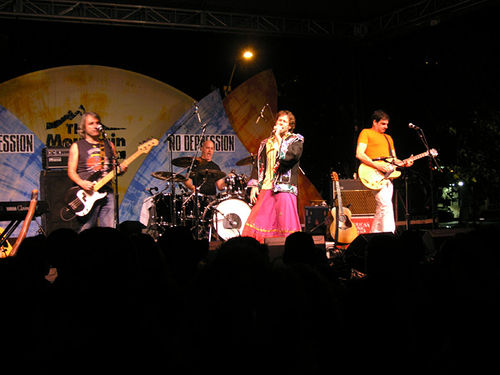
- Hothouse Flowers in 2005

Background information
- Origin: Dublin, Ireland
- Genres: Alternative rock; folk rock; Celtic rock
- Years active: 1985–1994; 1998–present
- Labels: London; PolyGram; Rubyworks
- Members: Liam Ó Maonlaí; Fiachna Ó Braonáin; Peter O'Toole; Dave Clarke; Martin Brunsden
- Past members: Michan Walker; John Paul Tansey; Jerry Fehily; Leo Barnes; Wayne Sheehy; Rob Malone; Maria Doyle Kennedy; Kieran Kennedy
- Website: hothouseflowers.com

Hothouse Flowers is an Irish rock band that combine traditional Irish music with influences from soul, gospel, and rock. Formed in 1985 in Dublin, they began as street performers. Their first album, People (1988), was the most successful debut album in Irish history, reaching No. 1 in Ireland and No. 2 in the UK. After two more albums and extensive touring, the group separated in 1994. Since reforming in 1998, the band members have sporadically toured and issued new songs, but also have pursued solo careers.

== History ==
The group first formed in 1985 when Liam Ó Maonlaí and Fiachna Ó Braonáin, who had known each other as children in an Irish-speaking school, Coláiste Eoin in Booterstown, Dublin, began performing as buskers (i.e. street musicians) on the streets of Dublin, under the name "The Incomparable Benzini Brothers". They were soon joined by Peter O'Toole and had won a street-entertainer award within a year. They renamed the group "Hothouse Flowers" (the name was suggested by singer Maria Doyle Kennedy during a brain-storming by band-members and friends in the Trinity College Arts Block café) and began writing songs and performing throughout Ireland. Rolling Stone magazine called them "the best-unsigned band in Europe".

In 1986, Bono from the band U2 saw the Flowers performing on television and offered his support. They released their first single, "Love Don't Work This Way", on U2's Mother Records label, which quickly led to a deal with the PolyGram subsidiary London Records.

Their first album, People, was released in May 1988 and was the most successful debut album in Irish history. It reached number one in Ireland within a week and eventually reached number 2 in the UK Albums Chart. The third single off the album "Feet on the Ground" shot to number one in Ireland on 19 March 1988. The international success of the album received a boost when a music video for the first single, "Don't Go", was played in the interval between contestants and the scoring in the 1988 Eurovision Song Contest. This propelled the song to number 11 in the UK Singles Chart, the highest position the band would ever achieve in this chart. In September 1988, the band appeared on the bill at the Reading Festival. In June 1989 they played at the Glastonbury Festival, and appeared there again the following year.

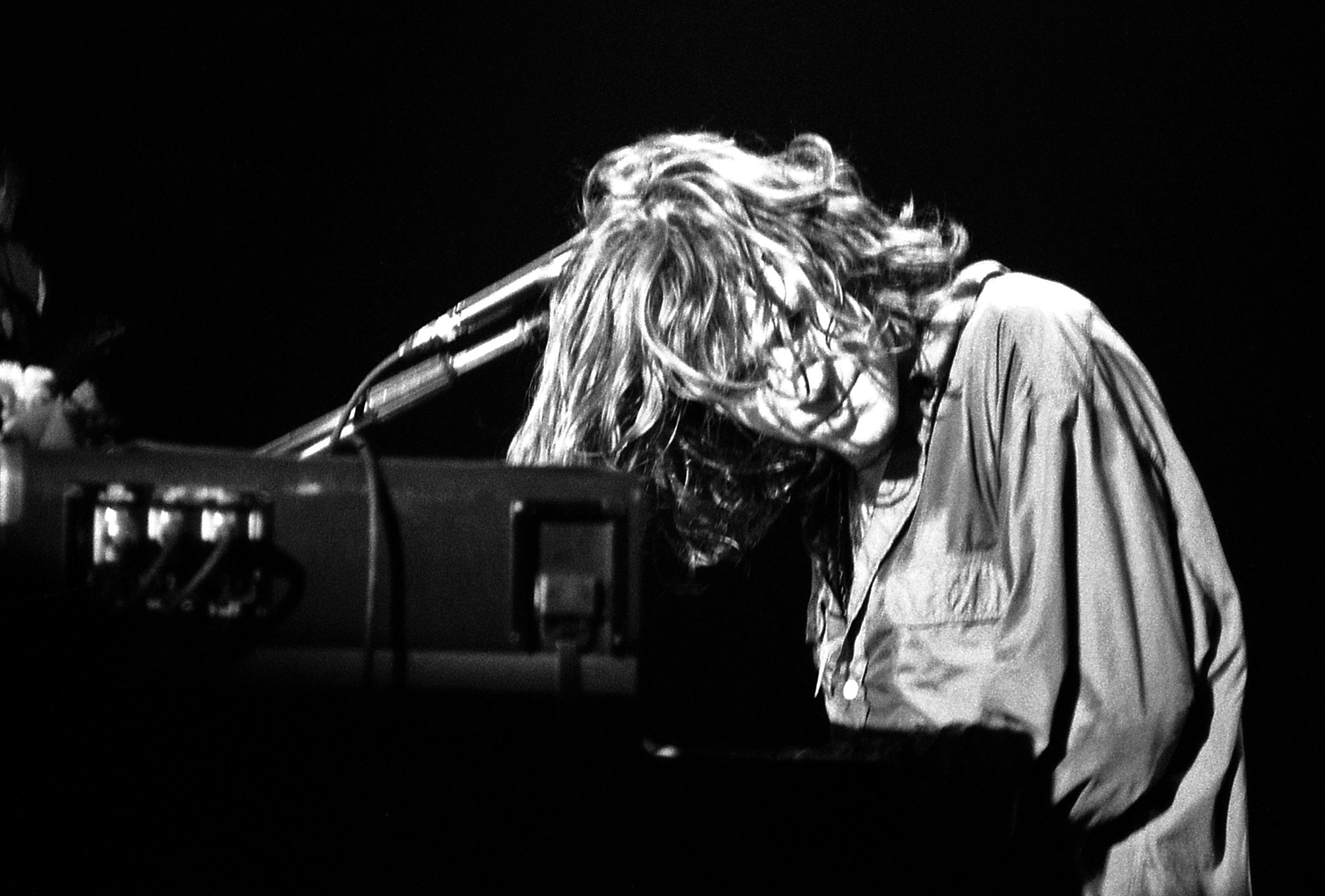
Ó Maonlaí during a performance with Hothouse Flowers, 7 June 1990

The group's second album, Home, was released in June 1990. It was recorded sporadically during extensive touring. There were recording sessions in Dublin; London; a rented house with a mobile recording set-up in Carlow, Ireland; and one day of work with Daniel Lanois in New Orleans, while Bob Dylan was taking a break from his sessions with Lanois. The album did not have the overwhelming success of the first record, but it did reach number one in Australia in 1991. "Give It Up" and "I Can See Clearly Now" (a cover version of the Johnny Nash song) from the album reached numbers 30 and 23 respectively in the UK Singles Chart.

In 1989, the Flowers collaborated with the Indigo Girls on their song "Closer to Fine", which became a US hit, and led to some exposure in the United States for the group (albeit limited, as their contribution to the song was uncredited).

In January 1992, the group appeared (as themselves) in an episode of the popular BBC drama series Lovejoy, entitled "No Strings".

In 1992, Hothouse Flowers joined Def Leppard – the combined group going by the name The Acoustic Hippies From Hell – to record three songs ("From the Inside", a cover of the Rolling Stones' "You Can't Always Get What You Want", and a cover of Jimi Hendrix's "Little Wing") that were included as B-sides on Def Leppard's single "Have You Ever Needed Someone So Bad", from their album Adrenalize.

Songs from the Rain was released in March 1993. Though it received good reviews and achieved some chart success in Australia and Ireland, worldwide sales were disappointing. In an attempt to boost record sales (and especially to break into the United States charts), the record label and the band's management kept the group on the road almost continuously for the entire year. The band also participated in the Another Roadside Attraction tour in Canada that year, and collaborated with The Tragically Hip, Crash Vegas, Midnight Oil and Daniel Lanois on the one-off single "Land" to protest forest clearcutting in British Columbia.

By early 1994, Ó Maonlaí had decided that the group was suffering from physical, mental and creative exhaustion, and he called for a year-long sabbatical.

The year-long break turned into several years, as the band members recouped their energy and experienced changes in their personal lives, including divorces, marriages, the birth of children and the death of Ó Maonlaí's father. The group also split from their long-time manager, and Leo Barnes (saxophone) and Jerry Fehily (drum kit) left the group. O'Toole and Ó Braonáin spent some of their time off from the Hothouse Flowers recording and touring with Michelle Shocked. Ó Maonlaí worked with Tim Finn and Andy White in the supergroup ALT, while also studying traditional Irish music.

In May 1998, they released Born. Joined by Wayne Sheehy on drums and Rob Malone on bass guitar, this album contained extensive songwriting contributions from O'Toole, who (freed from his bass responsibilities) played mostly guitar, bouzouki and keyboards on the recording. The music also incorporated more elements of electronic loops, synthesizers and studio effects. The following month, they appeared at the 1998 Glastonbury Festival.

By 1999, they had reached the end of their contract with London Records, and both the label and the band decided not to renew. The label head allowed the group the rights to record songs from their past London releases and produce a live record. Live was self-released by the group later that year, taken mostly from an October 1998 show in the National Stadium, Dublin, with one track from a November show in Tokyo. Sheehy and Malone left the group shortly after the release of the record. Dave Clarke, formerly of Blue in Heaven, joined on drums and O'Toole returned to the bass.

In 2000, London Records released a compilation album of songs from their four previous albums, titled The Best of.

During the band's official hiatus between Songs from the Rain and Born, band members had both written songs individually, and sporadically got together to write collaboratively. Some of these songs were never released, while others altered significantly to become some of the tracks on Born. In 2003, the Flowers collected these unreleased recordings and issued them as The Vaults, Vol. 1.

In February 2004, the band released the album Into Your Heart, produced by the band and John Reynolds. The first single, "Your Love Goes On", reached number 3 on the Irish chart. The album also reached number 3 on the Irish Albums Chart. The record was released on the RubyMusic label in Europe and distributed by Redeye in the United States. They have toured extensively in support of the record, including a performance at the Glastonbury Festival in 2004. Peter O'Toole left the band after this.

Ó Maonlaí has done several tours as a solo acoustic performer and released an album in 2005 called Rian.

In 2007, Ó Braonáin appeared on Belinda Carlisle's album Voila, singing a duet with her on a cover of "Bonnie and Clyde". Hothouse Flowers appeared at the Glastonbury Festival Acoustic tent in 2007. Ó Braonáin and Clarke have also collaborated with a former member of The Pogues in the group Pre-Nup, who have opened some shows in America for Hothouse Flowers. An album by Pre-Nup, Hell to Pay, was released on 4 September 2007.

In February 2008, Martin Brunsden (double bass) played his first gig with the band and has been playing with them onstage ever since.

In late 2008, Ó Maonlaí released his follow up album to Rian, entitled To Be Touched. In 2015, O'Toole rejoined the band, and they toured the UK in October and November of that year, with the tour named "Away with the Traveling Circus". During an interview on "The Imelda May Show" in Ireland, the band confirmed they were working on a new album, tentatively scheduled for release in early 2016. Some material from the album was played during the tour, and the album was finally released on 17 November 2016, called Let's Do This Thing and recorded at Windmill Lane Studios in Dublin.

The band played a live version of their cover "I Can See Clearly Now" on the premiere episode of Amazon Prime's The Grand Tour, first made available to stream on 17 November 2016. As a result, they saw an upswing in popularity, with "I Can See Clearly Now" going to number one on the iTunes Rock Chart Singles in the UK.

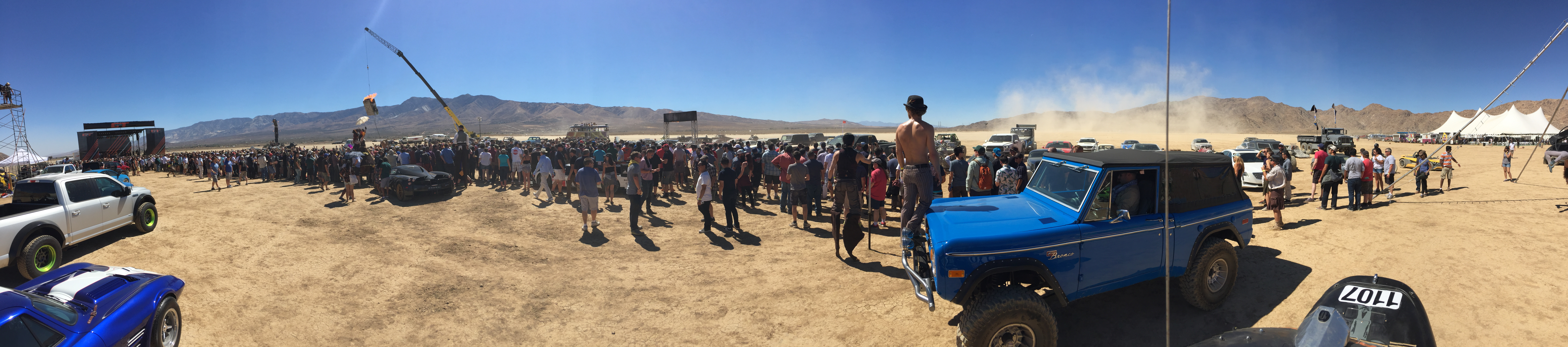
Hothouse Flowers performing "I Can See Clearly Now" in the Lucerne Valley, California for "The Holy Trinity" episode of The Grand Tour

Former band member, saxophone player Leo Barnes, died of an apparent brain hemorrhage in April 2022.

== Band members ==
Current

- Liam Ó Maonlaí – lead vocals, keyboards, guitar (1985–1994, 1998–present)
- Fiachna Ó Braonáin – guitar, backing vocals (1985–1994, 1998–present)
- Peter O'Toole – bass (1986–1994, 1999–2004), guitar (1985–1990, 1998–1999, 2015–present), backing vocals (1985–2004, 2015–present), keyboards (1998–1999)
- Dave Clarke – drums (1999–present)
- Martin Brunsden – bass (2008–present)

Former

- Michan Walker – bass (1985–1986)
- John Paul Tansey – drums (1985–1987)
- Jerry Fehily – drums (1985–1994)
- Leo Barnes – saxophone, backing vocals (1985–1994; died 2022), keyboards (1990–1994)
- Wayne Sheehy – drums (1998–1999)
- Rob Malone – bass (1998–1999)
- Kieran Kennedy – guitar (2001), bass (2004–2008)

== Discography ==
=== Albums ===
==== Studio albums ====
List of studio albums, with selected chart positions and certifications
Title	Album details	Peak chart positions										Certifications
Title	Album details	IRE	AUS	AUT	GER	NED	NZ	SWE	SWI	UK	US	Certifications
People	Released: May 1988; Label: London	1	30	20	32	47	6	11	21	2	88	BPI: Gold; RMNZ: Gold
Home	Released: June 1990; Label: London	1	1	—	32	61	13	11	—	5	122	ARIA: Platinum; BPI: Gold
Songs from the Rain	Released: March 1993; Label: London	1	19	—	79	64	22	18	32	7	156	BPI: Silver
Born	Released: May 1998; Label: London	26	165	—	—	—	—	—	—	97	—	
Into Your Heart	Released: February 2004; Label: Rubyworks	3	—	—	—	—	—	—	—	—	—	
Let's Do This Thing	Released: 17 November 2016; Label: Octopus Music	—	—	—	—	—	—	—	—	—	—	
"—" denotes a recording that did not chart or was not released in that territory.

==== Compilation albums ====
List of compilation albums, with selected chart positions
Title	Album details	Peak chart positions	
Title	Album details	IRE	AUS
Just a Note	Released: November 1991 (Australia only); Label: PolyGram	—	74
The Best of	Released: October 2000; Label: London	35	—
The Vaults, Vol. 1	Released: 2003; Label: London	—	—
The Platinum Collection	Released: March 2006; Label: Rhino	44	—
"—" denotes a recording that did not chart or was not released in that territory.

==== Live albums ====
List of live albums
Title	Album details
Live	Released: 1999; Label: Self-released
Goodnight Sun	Released: 2010; Label: Self-released

=== Singles ===
List of singles, with selected chart positions, showing year released and album name
Title	Year	Peak chart positions											Album
Title	Year	IRE	AUS	AUT	BEL (FL)	GER	NED	NZ	SWE	UK	US Main.	US Mod.	Album
"Love Don't Work This Way"	1987	7	—	—	—	—	—	—	—	—	—	—	People
"Don't Go"	1987	2	—	—	—	—	—	—	—	—	—	—	People
"Feet on the Ground"	1988	1	—	—	—	—	—	—	—	—	—	—	People
"Don't Go" (1988 re-release)	1988	2	39	16	36	26	28	6	6	11	16	7	People
"I'm Sorry"	1988	14	50	—	—	—	82	30	—	53	23	12	People
"It'll Be Easier in the Morning"	1988	6	98	—	—	—	—	—	—	77	—	—	People
"Give It Up"	1990	3	53	—	—	52	—	—	—	30	29	2	Home
"I Can See Clearly Now"	1990	5	22	—	—	—	—	—	—	23	—	—	Home
"Movies"	1990	19	66	—	—	—	—	—	—	68	—	—	Home
"Christchurch Bells"	1991	—	98	—	—	—	—	—	—	—	—	—	Home
"Hardstone City"	1991	7	97	—	—	—	—	—	—	—	—	—	Home
"The Rose" (with The Dubliners)	1991	2	—	—	—	—	—	—	—	—	—	—	Non-album single
"An Emotional Time"	1993	5	57	—	—	—	—	—	—	38	—	—	Songs from the Rain
"Thing of Beauty"	1993	—	—	—	—	—	—	—	—	—	32	14	Songs from the Rain
"One Tongue"	1993	—	117	—	—	55	—	—	—	45	—	—	Songs from the Rain
"Isn't It Amazing"	1993	—	—	—	—	—	—	—	—	46	—	—	Songs from the Rain
"This Is It (Your Soul)"	1993	—	—	—	—	—	—	—	—	67	—	—	Songs from the Rain
"Land" (with Midnight Oil, Daniel Lanois, Crash Vegas and The Tragically Hip)	1994	—	63	—	—	—	—	—	—	—	—	—	Non-album single
"You Can Love Me Now"	1998	32	148	—	—	—	—	—	—	65	—	—	Born
"Your Love Goes On"	2004	12	—	—	—	—	—	—	—	—	—	—	Into Your Heart
"—" denotes a single that did not chart or was not released in that territory.

=== Guest appearances ===
List of non-single guest appearances, showing year released and album name
Title	Year	Album
"Wild White Horse"	1988	The Courier soundtrack
"Hard Rain"	1989	Greenpeace Rainbow Warriors
"Bright Side of the Road"	1994	No Prima Donna: The Songs of Van Morrison
"Sí Do Mhamó Í"	2013	Larry Kirwan's Celtic Invasion
