= It's Sydney or the Bush =

1996 album by The Inbreds

Studio album by The Inbreds
- Released: 1996
- Recorded: April – June 1996
- Studio: Idea of East, Halifax, Nova Scotia
- Genre: Indie rock, Alternative rock
- Label: TAG
- Producer: Lincoln Fong

The Inbreds chronology
Kombinator (1994)	It's Sydney or the Bush (1996)	Winning Hearts (1998)

It's Sydney or the Bush is the third studio album by Canadian alternative rock duo The Inbreds, released in 1997 on PF Records in Canada and TAG Recordings in the United States.

Produced by Lincoln Fong, the album represented an expansion of the band's minimalist bass guitar and drum sound, incorporating guitars, keyboards and horns. Guest musicians on the album included guitarist Matt Murphy, trumpeter Mick Ball and violinist Nick Bowers-Broadbent.

The album reached number one on the Canadian national campus radio charts, and was nominated for a Juno Award in 1997 for Best Alternative Album.

The album was reissued on vinyl in 2016 by Label Obscura, alongside both Kombinator and Winning Hearts.

== Track listing ==
No.	Title	Writer(s)	Length
1.	"North Window"	The Inbreds	2:54
2.	"Wanna Be Your Friend"	The Inbreds	2:21
3.	"Drag Us Down"	The Inbreds	3:27
4.	"When You're Angry"	The Inbreds	2:48
5.	"Final Word"	The Inbreds	4:26
6.	"Cut My Throat"	The Inbreds	3:15
7.	"My Favourite Satellite"	The Inbreds	3:26
8.	"Sad Sack"	The Inbreds	4:13
9.	"Do You Really"	The Inbreds	4:19
10.	"Wind Picks Up"	The Inbreds	3:29
11.	"Reason Why I'm Shy"	The Inbreds	5:16
