= Tuns =

Canadian indie rock supergroup

TUNS
- Origin: Halifax, Nova Scotia
- Genres: Rock, alternative rock, power pop, indie rock
- Years active: 2015–present
- Label: Royal Mountain Records
- Members: Mike O'Neill; Chris Murphy; Matt Murphy

TUNS is a Canadian indie rock supergroup, consisting of Mike O'Neill of The Inbreds, Chris Murphy of Sloan and Matt Murphy of The Super Friendz. The band's name is a reference to the Technical University of Nova Scotia.

== History ==
Formed in 2015, the group released its debut single "Throw It All Away" that year, shortly before their first major live performance at Hayden's Dream Serenade benefit concert at Massey Hall alongside Joel Plaskett, The Weather Station, and Choir! Choir! Choir!. They performed around Ontario with Zeus in November that year, and continued touring in 2016, including at the Hillside Festival in Guelph.

The band's self-titled debut album was released in August 2016 on Royal Mountain Records. The tracks were recorded live, with some mixing in of vocals and guitar solos. The single "Mind Over Matter" reached #1 on CBC Radio 2's Radio 2 Top 20 chart the week of July 8, 2016.

Their second album, Duly Noted, was released in 2021.
