= The Yard (2011 TV series) =

- Created by: David Eddie; Michael Mabbott
- Country of origin: Canada
- No. of seasons: 1
- No. of episodes: 6

Production
- Production company: Whizbang Films

Original release
- Network: HBO Canada
- Release: July 8 – August 5, 2011

The Yard is a Canadian mockumentary comedy series that originally aired on HBO Canada in 2011. Set in a schoolyard, the series depicts the interactions of two rival gangs of elementary school students, with the plot of each episode serving as a parody of an adult-oriented crime drama series such as The Sopranos or The Wire. In the United States, it is available for 1080p HD digital download on the iTunes Store.

== Cast ==
=== The Good Guys ===
- Nick - played by Quintin Colantoni, the eleven-year-old Capo of The Yard, quintessentially cool and a hard-nosed realist, he is also an astute reader of human nature. He is wise beyond his years, and is loyal and fair to his lieutenants. He is self-assured and possesses an easy charm.
- Johnny - played by Shemar Charles, Nick's oldest friend, going back to Kindergarten. He thinks he has magical powers but his tricks only work some of the time. He's trying to become a great magician. He is a pervert, sniffing girls hair, spying on them in the bathroom, and is hoping for a girlfriend to be an assistant.
- Suzi - played by Keana Bastidas, Nick's enforcer. Being a girl, she can hit both boys (without fear of retribution) and girls, and she is the toughest kid in the yard. She is a bed wetter and is given a dollar for every night she doesn't wet the bed; one month she made $12. Suzi hates Mary because she urinated into Mary's sleeping bag at a sleep-over thus causing Mary to tell others about Suzi's bed wetting.
- J.J. - played by Alex Cardillo, the second smartest kid in school and the brains of Nick's outfit. He became a vegetarian after reading Charlotte's Web. He won 2nd place at the Science fair. He also has a crush on The Mole, Beth. He is Nick's brother.
- Adam - played by Devan Cohen, Nick’s youngest brother. He’s just a little kid who wants to play.

=== The Bad Guys ===
- Frankie Miladic - played by Daniel Lupetina. His big brother Drago ran the yard last year, before leaving for middle school. Believes Nick has stolen his birthright.
- Mickey Dos Santos - played by Daryn Karp, one of Frankie's Gang. Pork Chop's younger brother. Shorter and none too bright; but what he lacks in intelligence, he makes up for in terrible flatulence.
- "Pork Chop" - played by Jared Karp, a big, overgrown kid, some of it muscle but much of it fat, who acts as Frankie's "enforcer."

=== Others ===
- Mary Miladic - played by Sarah Cranmer, Frankie's sister and queen bee of the girls. Underneath it all she is a very serious and savvy politician who works tirelessly behind the scenes to manipulate the leaders (Frankie and Nick) into keeping peace in the Yard.
- Alistair - played by Cameron Mazzei, Nerdy but flashily dressed, Alistair is the best Ju-Ji-Mon (a trading card game) player in the Yard. He is allergic to peanuts.
- Cory - played by John Fleming, Son of a single mom, there is some dysfunction and disarray in his home life. Always dressed in hand-me-downs. When his mom has gone off the wagon, he shows up for school with a non-alcoholic beer and a can of vegetables for lunch.
- Patti - played by Olivia Scriven, a pretty thing and a gold digger. Friends' with Mary and arm candy to Alistair. Plays on the Girls soccer team too.
- Wayne Chang - played by Siam Yu, The Yard's Asian Minister of Information.
- Ashok - played by Ajay Gautam, The Yard's "doctor". Knows how to use an EpiPen. Dreams of becoming a real doctor when he grows up.
- The Mole/Beth- played by Brittany Bridges, The smartest kid at school. Loves naked mole-rats and ants. Won 1st place at the Science fair.
- Piya - Johnny sniffed her hair in class after the room went dark.
- Sadie - A girl who was tricked into drinking a love potion by Johnny, but it only gave her hiccups.

== Plot ==
The series is seen by an unseen documentarian, voiced by Paul Gross, at Parker Elementary School in Canada. Providing both behind-the-scenes footage and interviews with the kids intercut with the main drama.

=== Episodes ===
1. "The Economy" - A new trading card game hits the yard and a financial crisis starts. The correlative adult issues include the 2008 financial crisis.
2. "Girls vs. Boys" - Johnny is kicked in the testicles by Patti. Nick tries to find out why Johnny was kicked and how to deal with it. The correlative adult issues include sexual harassment and varieties of feminism.
3. "The Territories" - North African students would love to play soccer, but Frankie and his crew won't let them use his field and war starts. The correlative adult issues include terrorism, religion, and property rights.
4. "The Catcher (The Black Market)" - Frankie and his crew work the peanut butter and jelly sandwich racket. Johnny is talked into the black market by Patti as a catcher and becomes indebted to Frankie. The correlative adult issue include the war on drugs and Cannabis in the United States.
5. "The Great Compromise" - Nick is overworked. But time off makes more trouble and chaos in The Yard.
6. "Big Business (The Free Market Stinks)" - Stink bombs are big business in the Yard and Frankie and his crew are at the top. But Mary Miladic starts to complain, Nick works out a plan for the stink bombs. Frankie employs The Mole/Beth to make a new type of failsafe bomb under the sandbox, but it fails on picture day.

== Reception ==
Bill Harris of the Toronto Sun called The Yard "kiddie ‘Sopranos’". The Grid called it "The Wire Babies".
