= Videotape (band) =

- Origin: Ottawa, Ontario, Canada
- Years active: 2007–present
- Labels: Independent
- Members: Adam Saikaley; Nathan Gara; Ryan Patterson
- Website: birdandflag.ca

Videotape is a three-piece pop music project of Canadians Adam Saikaley, Nathan Gara and Ryan Patterson, based in Ottawa, Ontario, Canada.

== History ==
Videotape was formed in Ottawa by three former members of As The Poets Affirm, after that band broke up in late 2007.

Videotape was listed on The Village Voice's Pazz & Jop 2008 charts. Their debut album, My Favourite Thing, was independently released in 2008, and appeared on the Canadian campus charts. It was later available for download. A single from the album Smiling Heads, was distributed through Zunior.

(Gara and Patterson are now based in Toronto) They are signed to Toronto record label, Bird & Flag.

== Discography ==
=== Albums ===
- 2008: My Favourite Thing (Independent)

=== Compilation appearances ===
- 2008: Coke Machine Glow 2008 Fantasy Podcast
