= Don't Go (Hothouse Flowers song) =

1987 single by Hothouse Flowers

- Artwork for the 1988 re-release

Single by Hothouse Flowers

from the album People
- B-side: "Better and Better", "Big Fat Heart" (1987); "Saved", "Hydroman" (1988)
- Released: 1987
- Recorded: August 1987
- Studio: The Townhouse III (London, England)
- Length: 3:48 (album version); 3:30 (single version)
- Label: London
- Songwriter(s): Liam Ó Maonlaí; Fiachna Ó Braonáin; Peter O'Toole
- Producer(s): Clive Langer; Alan Winstanley

Hothouse Flowers singles chronology
"Love Don't Work This Way" (1987)	"Don't Go" (1987)	"Feet on the Ground" (1988)

"Don't Go" is the first single released by Irish rock group Hothouse Flowers from their debut studio album, People (1988). Originally released in Ireland in 1987, the song peaked at number two on the Irish Singles Chart. The following year, after Hothouse Flowers played the song during their interval performance at the 1988 Eurovision Song Contest, the track charted in Ireland once more, reaching number two for a second time.

Worldwide, "Don't Go" reached the top 10 in New Zealand and Sweden as well as the top 40 in several other European countries. In the United States, the song did not chart on the Billboard Hot 100, but it did reach number seven on the Modern Rock Tracks chart and number 16 on the Album Rock Tracks chart. The single version of "Don't Go" is different from the LP version; it was never released on a CD (or on any streaming service) until a "deluxe" edition of People was released in 2025.

== Track listings ==
=== 1987 releases ===
7-inch single

A. "Don't Go"
B. "Better and Better"

12-inch single

A1. "Don't Go" (extended mix)
B1. "Big Fat Heart"
B2. "Better and Better"

10-inch single

A1. "Don't Go" (extended mix)
A2. "Better and Better"
B1. "Don't Go" (live acoustic version)
B2. "Lonely Lane" (live)

=== 1988 releases ===
7-inch and mini-CD single

1. "Don't Go"
2. "Saved"

12-inch single

A1. "Don't Go"
B1. "Saved"
B2. "Hydroman"

CD single and mini-album

1. "Don't Go" – 3:29
2. "Feet on the Ground" – 3:28
3. "Lonely Lane" (live) – 5:25
4. "Saved" – 3:37

CD Video single

1. "Don't Go" (audio) – 3:32
2. "I'm Sorry" (audio) – 3:35
3. "Ballad of Katie" (audio) – 6:10
4. "Don't Go" (video) – 3:12

== Charts ==
=== Weekly charts ===
Chart (1987–1988)	Peak position
Australia (ARIA)	39
Austria (Ö3 Austria Top 40)	16
Belgium (Ultratop 50 Flanders)	36
Canada Top Singles (RPM)	45
Europe (Eurochart Hot 100)	33
Ireland (IRMA)	2
Netherlands (Dutch Top 40)	28
Netherlands (Single Top 100)	28
New Zealand (Recorded Music NZ)	6
Sweden (Sverigetopplistan)	6
UK Singles (OCC)	11
US Album Rock Tracks (Billboard)	16
US Modern Rock Tracks (Billboard)	7
West Germany (GfK)	26

=== Year-end charts ===
Chart (1988)	Position
New Zealand (RIANZ)	39

== Release history ==
Region	Date	Format(s)	Label(s)	Ref.
Ireland	1987	7-inch vinyl; 12-inch vinyl	London	
United Kingdom	2 November 1987	7-inch vinyl; 12-inch vinyl	London	
United Kingdom (re-release)	11 April 1988	7-inch vinyl; 12-inch vinyl	London	
Australia	30 May 1988	7-inch vinyl; 12-inch vinyl; CD	London	

== In popular culture ==
The song was performed by the Hothouse Flowers as the interval act of the 1988 Eurovision Song Contest held in Dublin, Ireland, which helped the band gain international recognition. The version used was the single version, not the LP mix, with the exception that the broadcast version was longer. The song is featured on an episode of the Irish sitcom Moone Boy.
