= The Life and Hard Times of Guy Terrifico =

- Directed by: Michael Mabbott
- Written by: Michael Mabbott
- Produced by: Nicholas Tabarrok
- Starring: Matt Murphy; Natalie Radford; Kris Kristofferson
- Cinematography: Adam Swica
- Edited by: Gareth C. Scales
- Music by: Michael Mabbott; Matt Murphy
- Production company: Odeon Films
- Release date: 2005
- Country: Canada
- Language: English

The Life and Hard Times of Guy Terrifico is a 2005 Canadian mockumentary film. Written and directed by Michael Mabbott, the film stars Matt Murphy, a musician previously associated with the bands The Super Friendz and The Flashing Lights, as Guy Terrifico, a country singer long rumoured to have died three decades earlier, but now reemerging from his disappearance and releasing a new album.

Murphy and Mabbott wrote the film's music, including the songs "Just a Show" and "Make Believe", which were nominated for Best Original Song at the 26th Genie Awards.

The film won the award for Best Canadian First Feature Film at the 2005 Toronto International Film Festival. In December 2005, it was named to TIFF's annual Canada's Top Ten list of the year's best Canadian films.

== Cast ==
- Matt Murphy as Guy Terrifico
- Natalie Radford as Mary Lou Griffiths
- Jane Sowerby as Loni Lipvanchuck
- Billy MacLellan as Wayne Lipvanchuck
- David Christo as Guy Jr.
- Lyriq Bent as Mr. Stuff
- Kris Kristofferson as Himself
- Merle Haggard as Himself
- Colin Linden as Himself
- Ronnie Hawkins as Himself
- Donnie Fritts as Himself
- Levon Helm as Himself
- Jim Cuddy as Himself
- Greg Keelor as Himself
- Rob Bowman as Himself
- George Stroumboulopoulos as Himself
- Phil Kaufman as Himself
