= Hilario (album) =

1992 album by The Inbreds

Studio album by The Inbreds
- Released: 1992
- Recorded: 1990–1992
- Genre: Indie rock
- Label: PF Records
- Producer: Dave Clark; Grant Ethier; Lewis Melville; Darryl Otis Smith

The Inbreds chronology
Hilario (1992)	Kombinator (1994)

Professional ratings
Review scores
Source	Rating
AllMusic	4/5 stars
The Encyclopedia of Popular Music	3/5 stars

Hilario is the debut full-length album from Canadian indie rock duo The Inbreds, released in 1992 on PF Records. The album compiles songs from the band's early demo cassettes Darn Foul Dog, Let's Get Together, Egrog, and the split 7-inch single "Shermans/Inbreds," as well as some unreleased material. The album was a hit on Canadian campus radio stations.

== Critical reception ==
Trouser Press wrote: "Although it’s clear the two had the architecture of their simple sound down from the very beginning, it took their songwriting a few months to shed a weakness for conceptual gimmickry ('Granpa’s Heater,' 'T.S. Eliot') and find a reliable perch from which to fly." Billboard called it "charming" but "spotty."

== Track listing ==
No.	Title	Length
1.	"Matterhorn"	3:12
2.	"Russ"	3:38
3.	"Noah's Cage"	3:54
4.	"Good Taste"	3:55
5.	"He Never"	2:54
6.	"Granpa's Heater"	3:27
7.	"Late Movie"	3:23
8.	"Thin"	2:53
9.	"Prince"	3:10
10.	"T.S. Eliot"	2:59
11.	"Final Word"	3:02
12.	"Oliver"	2:54
13.	"Smote"	3:27
14.	"Tell The Truth"	2:33
15.	"Landlord"	1:57
16.	"Carnival"	2:59
17.	"Derailleur"	4:09
18.	"Bub"	1:59
19.	"Fine"	3:14
20.	"T.S. Eliot (Youth Mix)"	2:55
21.	"Farmboy"	3:11

== Personnel ==
- Mike O'Neill - bass, vocals
- Dave Ullrich - drums
