= Van Allen Belt (band) =

Van Allen Belt was a Canadian alternative rock group from Kingston, Ontario, active in the 1990s. An experimental rock band whose sound included forays into electroacoustic music, they were best known for appearing on the Another Roadside Attraction festival bill in 1997.

== History ==
Van Allen Belt was formed in 1994 by Queen's University students Shawn Savoie, Mark Fraser and Jason Joly. The group won a university battle of the bands competition before releasing their self-titled debut album in 1996. They performed in support the album as an opening act for The Tragically Hip at several concerts in both Canada and the United States.

Van Allen Belt followed up in 1997 with The Brown Bomber, a concept album about a faith healer named Bishop Brown who had grown up as the child of circus freaks, and performed on the Tragically Hip's Another Roadside Attraction bill that year.

They were selected by Billboard as a band to watch in 1998, but ultimately broke up before recording another album.
