= The Golden Seals =

Organization

- Origin: Ottawa, Ontario, Canada
- Genres: Indie rock, alternative rock
- Years active: 1999–present
- Label: Zunior
- Members: Mike Bonnell; Steve Boudreau; Philip Shaw Bova; Dave Merritt; Matt Ouimet
- Website: The Golden Seals

The Golden Seals were a Canadian indie rock band formed in 1999 in London, Ontario, and were based in Ottawa, Ontario, Canada. The band was led by singer and songwriter Dave Merritt and his long-time collaborator Philip Shaw Bova. Past members and contributors included Matt Ouimet, Steve Boudreau, Michael Bonnell, Jeremy Gara (Arcade Fire), Jordon Zadorozny (Blinker the Star), Andy Magoffin (Two-Minute Miracles), and John Higney.

== History ==
The Golden Seals formed in 1999, after Merritt and Bonnell's prior bands, Adam West and The Buffalo Brothers, broke up. The two originally collaborated on a song for the Rheostatics album The Story of Harmelodia, "Song of the Garden," and then began working on the first Golden Seals album, Storybook Endings, which was released in 2001. Their second album, 2002's No-Hitter, appeared on local community radio charts.

The band released two EPs on the Zunior label. They also contributed a cover of Rheostatics' "Loving Arms" to the 2007 Rheostatics tribute album The Secret Sessions.

The Golden Seals did not record another full-length album until 2011, when their power-pop album Increase the Sweetness was released, to positive reviews and substantial radio play on CBC.

The band released Songs By Other People in 2020 as their final album together, later releasing their single To Be or Not To Be (With Me) in 2021 before disbanding.

== Discography ==
- Storybook Endings (2001)
- No-Hitter (2002)
- Business Casual (2005, EP)
- Wetsuit (2006, EP)
- Increase the Sweetness (2011)
- Stay Golden (2014, mostly covers)
- Something Isn't Happening (2019)
- Songs By Other People (2020)
- To Be or Not To Be (With Me) (2021, single)

== See also ==
- Music of Canada
- Canadian rock
- List of Canadian musicians
- List of bands from Canada
- Category:Canadian musical groups
