= David Eddie =

Canadian writer

- Occupations: novelist, humorist
- Years active: 1990s–present
- Notable work: Chump Change, Damage Control, The Yard

David Eddie is a Canadian writer, best known as a humorous advice columnist for The Globe and Mail.

His debut novel Chump Change was published in 1996, and was a shortlisted nominee for the Stephen Leacock Award and the Toronto Book Award in 1997. His second book, the non-fiction memoir Housebroken: Confessions of a Stay-at-Home Dad, was published in 1999, and was a shortlisted finalist for the Stephen Leacock Award in 2000.

In 2003, he began writing a regular column for the Canadian men's magazine Toro. He later joined The Globe and Mail, for which he writes the weekly column "Damage Control". He has also written for publications including Canadian Living, Chatelaine, the National Post, the Ottawa Citizen and Maclean's.

His third book, Damage Control, was published in 2010.

He was co-creator with Michael Mabbott of the six-episode television series The Yard, which aired on HBO Canada in 2011.
