= Another Roadside Attraction (festival) =

Traveling music and arts festival in Canada

Another Roadside Attraction was a travelling music-and-arts summer festival in Canada in the 1990s. Headlined by The Tragically Hip with a different lineup of supporting bands for each of the three tours, the festival travelled across Canada for between eight and ten dates in each of 1993, 1995 and 1997. Each show usually lasted roughly eight hours.

The name was taken from the Tom Robbins novel Another Roadside Attraction. The Hip were originally thinking of calling it Heksenketel, which is Dutch for "witches' cauldron"; although that name was not used for the concert festival, it was later used as the title of a concert video recorded on the 1993 tour.

The first Another Roadside Attraction in 1993 included Midnight Oil, Crash Vegas, Hothouse Flowers and Daniel Lanois. These five acts also collaborated on a one-off charity single, "Land", in 1993 to protest forest clearcutting in British Columbia. Following the Ottawa performance at Lansdowne Stadium, the promoters faced charges under the city's bylaw for the sound exceeding the maximum permitted decibel level for public events. The festival's two dates in Toronto also included performances by artists who were not part of the full national tour, including Headstones, Vilain Pingouin, Thomas Trio and the Red Albino, 13 Engines, Andrew Cash, Richard Séguin and The Pursuit of Happiness.

The second tour in 1995 featured Blues Traveler, Matthew Sweet, Eric's Trip, Rheostatics, Spirit of the West, Ziggy Marley and the Melody Makers and The Inbreds, while the third and final tour in 1997 featured Sheryl Crow, Wilco, Los Lobos, Change of Heart, Ron Sexsmith, Ashley MacIsaac, The Mutton Birds and Van Allen Belt. The 1997 tour included dates in Darien Lake, New York and Highgate, Vermont, the only times the festival was ever staged outside Canada. Los Lobos' participation in the 1997 tour, in turn, led to Steve Berlin producing the Tragically Hip's next two albums Phantom Power and Music @ Work.

The festival was not mounted in 1999, as the band had only just completed touring behind Phantom Power a couple of months earlier, and were not prepared to organize another festival so soon afterward.
