= Halifax Pop Explosion =

Music festival in Halifax, Canada

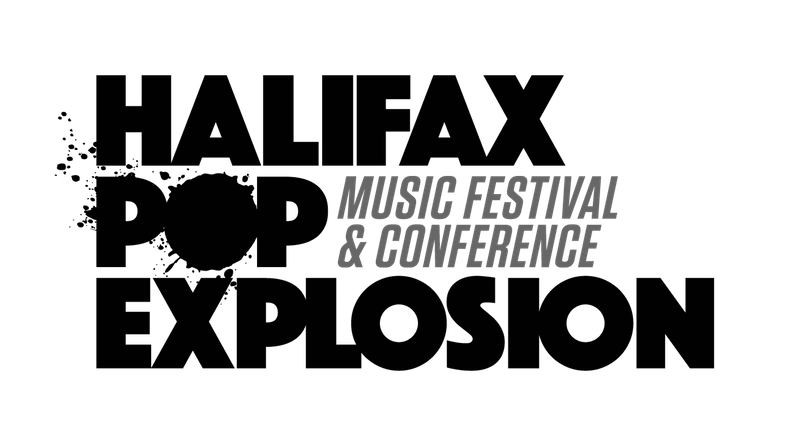
- Genre: Indie rock, hip hop, punk rock, country, folk, experimental
- Dates: Mid-October
- Locations: Halifax, Nova Scotia, Canada
- Years active: 1993–1999; 2001–2021
- Website: halifaxpopexplosion.com (archived 28 Nov 2020)

The Halifax Pop Explosion (HPX) was a music festival and conference that occurred every fall, typically two weeks after Thanksgiving, in Halifax, Nova Scotia, Canada. The term "Halifax Pop Explosion" also came to be adopted in the 1990s as the name of the Halifax alternative rock music scene as a whole, which at that time was dominated by power pop acts such as Sloan, Plumtree, Jale, The Super Friendz, and Thrush Hermit.

== History ==
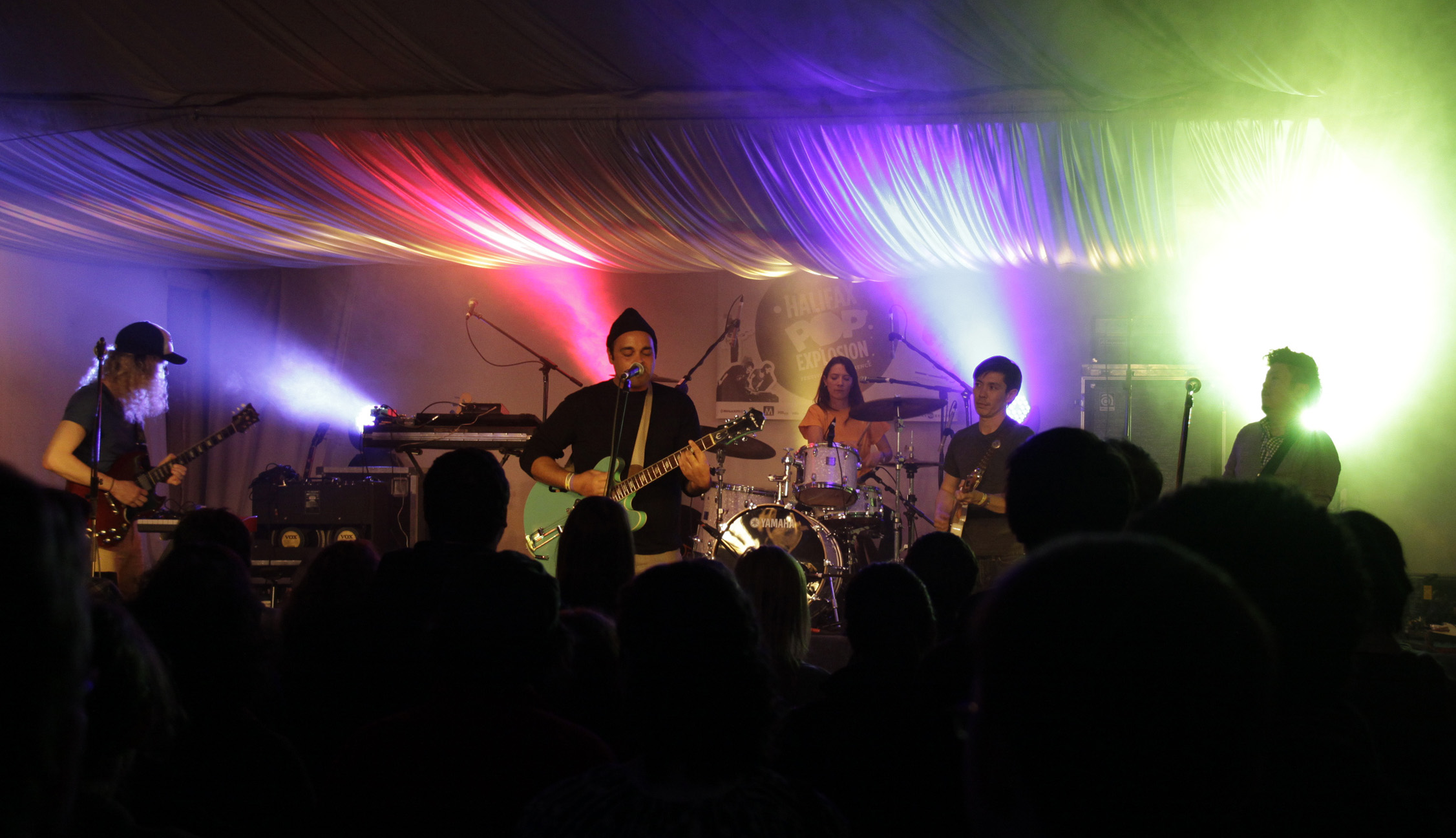
The Bicycles performing in October 2012

Founded in 1993, the Halifax Pop Explosion was three different events that are now remembered as one long-standing event. The original Halifax Pop Explosion, which was operated as a private business from 1993–1995, was created as a platform to celebrate Halifax's newfound fame as the "Seattle of the North" and home of Canadian grunge, as well as to promote local bands such as Sloan, The Inbreds, Jale, The Super Friendz, and Thrush Hermit.

The company that organized the festival went out of business and a new organization launched the "Halifax On Music Festival", which ran successfully but not profitably for four years. The festival did not take place in 2000. In 2001, Waye Mason, a past owner of the Halifax On Music Festival, created the not-for-profit Halifax Pop Explosion Association to operate the festival for the good of the music community, regardless of long term profitability. The festival name returned to the Halifax Pop Explosion and the event doubled in size. The festival expanded its programming to support other genres within the independent music community, as well as the power pop for which it was best known for. By 2006, it was featuring acts from hip hop and electronica, to folk rock and alt-country, to punk and hardcore. With 180 plus bands in 20 venues over five days, the festival exhibited considerable breadth in presenting new music.

In recent years, the music festival has been plagued with funding issues and allegations of systemic racism after an incident at the show of Colombian Canadian musician Lido Pimienta in 2017. The 2020 Halifax Pop Explosion resulted in a deficit amid the COVID-19 pandemic, and since 2021, a new edition of the festival has not been held.

== Venues ==
Music venues that have hosted the Halifax Pop Explosion include:

- The Seahorse Tavern
- The Marquee Ballroom
- Gus' Pub
- CKDU Lobby
- The Carleton
- Rebecca Cohn Auditorium
- Bus Stop Theatre
- The Khyber
- The Pavilion

Along with musical acts, the Halifax Pop Explosion had also hosted conferences annually at the Halifax Central Library. The conferences included the XPAND panel, which focused on inclusivity in music, and a Label Summit, to discuss issues within the music industry affecting labels and artists.

== 2017 Lido Pimienta incident ==
A disruption occurred during Lido Pimienta's concert at the festival on October 19, 2017. According to a statement that was released by the festival, the incident involved a white volunteer photographer and several white audience members who reacted negatively when Pimienta invited "brown girls to the front" during her show. When the festival-sanctioned volunteer photographer, who was documenting the performance, refused to move after ten separate requests, Pimienta said, "You're cutting into my set time and you're disrespecting these women, and I don't have time for this." The volunteer was no longer allowed to volunteer with the festival. The organizers later apologized to Pimienta, and executive director James Boyle resigned over the incident.

== Related events ==
In addition to the music, the Halifax Pop Explosion supported a variety of independent arts and pop culture events every October. The Indie Zine and Label Fair, which had been growing since 1996, was replaced by more discrete events in recent years; for example, the Halifax Zine Fair, has been held annually since 1999 and occur concurrently with HPX in October. There is also a series of art gallery exhibitions staged around town.

== See also ==
- List of country music festivals
- List of festivals in Canada
- Music of Canada
