= Dave Bookman =

Canadian radio personality (1960–2019)

- Born: May 30, 1960
- Died: May 21, 2019 (aged 58)
- Awards: Unsung Hero Award from the Canadian Independent Music Awards
- Presenting career
- Stations: CFNY-FM, CIND-FM

Dave "Bookie" Bookman (May 30, 1960 – May 21, 2019) was a Canadian radio personality, most noted for his long career in the Toronto radio market. Associated primarily with CFNY-FM (102.1 the Edge) and later with CIND-FM (Indie 88), he was known as a passionate promoter of indie music and as an excellent interviewer with a gift for getting even famously "difficult" or reclusive musicians, such as David Byrne, Jeff Tweedy and Elvis Costello, to open up more than usual in interviews.

== Career ==
He began his radio career in the 1980s, hosting various shows on the University of Toronto's campus radio station CIUT-FM and working as a sportscaster for CKAR's local broadcasts of Oshawa Generals hockey games. He was also active as a musician in this era, forming the folk punk band The Bookmen with Tim Mech, and releasing the independent album Volume One: Delicatessen in 1987. The band also recorded a cover of Costello's "(What's So Funny 'Bout) Peace, Love, and Understanding", which appeared on a split 7-inch single with Fluid Waffle in 1988.

He joined CFNY in 1991, initially as a reporter for Live in Toronto. In 1993 he launched "Dave Bookman's Nu Music Nite", a long-running Tuesday night concert series at The Horseshoe Tavern; although primarily a showcase for emerging bands who were not yet big enough to secure prime weekend slots at the bar, over the course of its run it also hosted free shows by major touring acts such as Old 97's, Ash, Spoon, Son Volt, Band of Horses, Matchbox 20, Whiskeytown, Eels, Nada Surf, Linkin Park, The Strokes, Thom Yorke and Foo Fighters. In 1996, he also programmed the Alternative Afternoons concert series at the CNE Bandshell.

With the Bookmen having broken up by this time, he launched the new band Midi Ogres with Dave Bidini. As a solo artist, he contributed a cover of Bob Snider's "Parkette" to the 1996 tribute album Poetreason: The Songs of Bob Snider; he was also the host of the live concert at which the album was recorded.

Over the course of his time with CFNY, he hosted the Indie Hour, weekend shifts and daytime afternoon drive, until he left the station in 2012. He joined Indie 88 the following year, hosting both a weekday shift and a weekend show on which he would freely play any music he liked regardless of whether it was part of the station's regularly formatted playlist.

In 2018, he won the Unsung Hero Award from the Canadian Independent Music Awards.

== Death ==
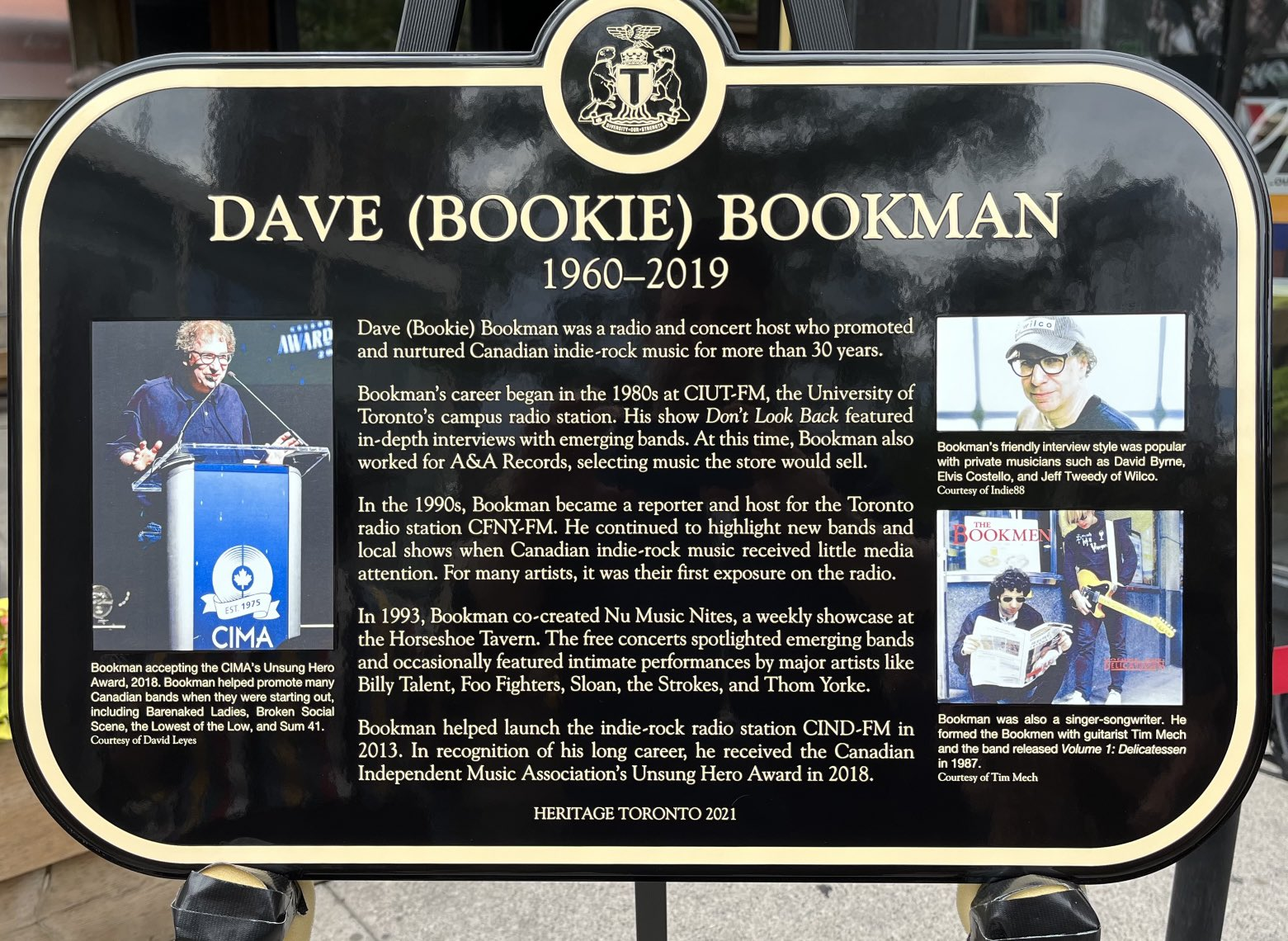
Dave Bookman plaque outside the Horseshoe Tavern in Toronto (photo © Canadian Jewish News)

In April 2019, Bookman suffered an aneurysm, and spent several weeks in intensive care until his death on May 21, 2019. On the day his death was announced to the public, Indie 88 suspended regular programming to air a live tribute program that blended some of Bookman's favourite music with reminiscences from his colleagues and on-air phonecalls from listeners, friends and musicians.

On May 29, 2019, Indie 88 aired a special fundraising radiothon, "A Day to Make Music Count", to raise money in Bookman's memory for MusiCounts, the music education initiative of the Canadian Academy of Recording Arts and Sciences. The broadcast raised over CA$69,000, significantly exceeding the station's CA$50,000 goal. A private memorial party for Bookman the following evening included live performances by Sloan, Blue Rodeo, Billy Talent, and Broken Social Scene, hosted by his good friend and sports TV personality Dave Hodge.

In November 2019, Bookman's family and friends organized another fundraiser for MusiCounts, making his vinyl record collection available for sale in conjunction with the independent record store Rotate This.

== Legacy ==
In July 2022, a Heritage Toronto plaque commemorating Bookman was unveiled outside the Horseshoe Tavern at 370 Queen Street West, commemorating Nu Music Nite and Bookman's support of music in Toronto.

In 2024, Indie 88 and Canadian Music Week staged Left of the Dial, a Bookman tribute show which saw Canadian artists performing The Replacements songs as a benefit for the Daily Bread Food Bank. Participating artists included Charlotte Cornfield, Bry Webb, NYSSA, Terra Lightfoot, Georgia Harmer, Ian Blurton, Skye Wallace, Tony Dekker and Julian Taylor. A second show, Let's Get Friendship Right, was staged in 2025 to perform the music of The Tragically Hip, with participants including Dekker, Brendan Canning, Peter Dreimanis and Leah Fay Goldstein, Kevin Hearn, Ben Kowalewicz, Meg Remy, Justin Rutledge, Shakura S'Aida, Talia Schlanger and Menno Versteeg.
