= Matt Murphy (Canadian musician) =

Canadian musician and actor

- Origin: Halifax, Nova Scotia, Canada
- Genres: Indie rock, power pop
- Instruments: Guitar, vocals
- Years active: 1990–present

Matt Murphy is a Canadian musician and actor. He is perhaps best known as the vocalist and guitarist of 1990s band The Super Friendz.

== Music career ==
Murphy first achieved notability for his role as leader of the mid-1990s Halifax band The Super Friendz, a power pop act that became a prominent part of the Halifax music scene, which at that time was often referred to as "Seattle north". Murphy formed the band with fellow King's College students Charles Austin (bass) and Drew Yamada (guitar). The three shared singing and songwriting duties, as was common in the democratically oriented scene at the time, but Murphy emerged as the standout performer.

After the Super Friendz dissolved in 1997, Murphy relocated to Toronto and formed a new band, The Flashing Lights. That band featured a more polished rock sound than the Super Friendz, and achieved a degree of fame in Canada. Its members were bassist Henri Sangalang, organist Gaven Dianda, and drummer Steve Pitkin, along with vocalist/guitarist Murphy.

Murphy also appeared on The Virginian, the 1997 debut album by Neko Case and Her Boyfriends, and also played lead guitar on ex-Inbreds singer Mike O'Neill's first solo album What Happens Now?.

Murphy now splits his days between Halifax and Toronto and his musical time among a variety of projects. In 2003, The Super Friendz reunited for a new album and a brief tour, and Murphy played a show with his old Halifax country side project Little Orton Hoggett.

Flashing Lights are currently on an indefinite hiatus. In 2004, Murphy became a member of Toronto band City Field, in which he plays a smaller role, providing mostly backing rather than lead vocals. He is currently a member of Brendan Canning's band Cookie Duster.

As of 2015, he has joined with Mike O'Neill of The Inbreds and Chris Murphy of Sloan in the supergroup Tuns.

== Acting ==
In 2005, Murphy branched out into acting, playing the lead role in the Canadian mockumentary film The Life and Hard Times of Guy Terrifico; he also scored much of the film's music. Murphy and the film's director, Michael Mabbott, received two Genie Award nominations for Best Original Song at the 26th Genie Awards in 2006 for the songs "Just a Show" and "Make Believe".

He later had a small role in the 2009 film Leslie, My Name Is Evil.
