= The Inbreds =

Canadian alternative rock band

- Mike O'Neill and Dave Ullrich

Background information
- Origin: Kingston, Ontario, Canada
- Genres: Alternative rock
- Years active: 1992–1998, 2005, 2007, 2008, 2012, 2016
- Labels: Zunior; Sappy; TAG; Atlantic; PF; Murder
- Members: Mike O'Neill; Dave Ullrich
- Website: inbreds.com

The Inbreds were a Canadian alternative rock band formed in 1992. Originally from Kingston, Ontario, the band relocated to Halifax, Nova Scotia, in 1996 and remained based there until breaking up in 1998. The band was a duo, consisting of vocalist/bassist Mike O'Neill and drummer Dave Ullrich.

Three of the four albums released during the band's existence reached number one on the Canadian national campus radio charts, and the band received two Juno nominations. The band was prominent in Canadian indie rock circles throughout the 1990s and were known for their unique, minimalist bass and drums approach, and melodies and harmonies which drew on classic pop music influences such as The Beatles and The Beach Boys.

== History ==
The Inbreds consisted of singer/songwriter/bassist Mike O'Neill and drummer Dave Ullrich, and were renowned for their unique bass and drums sound; unlike conventional bass guitar technique, O'Neill actually played full chords on the instrument, punctuated with single notes that allowed the bass line to sound as though two distinct instruments were being played at once. A few of the band's songs, particularly on their third album It's Sydney or the Bush, did feature guitars, piano, horns, and other instruments, which were played by O'Neill or guest musicians such as Matt Murphy, Matt Kelly, Mick Ball, and Nick Bowers-Broadbent.

Though perhaps most often associated with the 1990s Canadian East Coast alternative rock scene (often referred to at the time as the Halifax Pop Explosion), the Inbreds were actually formed in Kingston, Ontario, in 1992, where O'Neill and Ullrich, childhood friends originally from Oshawa, were attending Queen's University. They subsequently released cassettes of their own music on Ullrich's PF (Proboscis Funkstone) Records. The band soon gained a small but loyal following.

Their 1993 debut LP, Hilario, consisted of previously released material compiled from the band's self-released Darn Foul Dog, Let's Get Together, and Egrog cassettes. The album brought the Inbreds to the attention of Rheostatics, who brought the band on tour with them. The Inbreds would later reach larger audiences while touring Canada, the US, and Europe with more established rock acts of the day such as the Tragically Hip and Buffalo Tom.

The band's second album Kombinator, was released in 1994 and was produced by Rheostatics' drummer Dave Clark. The album received heavy college radio airplay and a MuchMusic Video Award nomination for Best Alternative Video, for "Any Sense of Time". They toured Canada to support the album as part of The Tragically Hip's second Another Roadside Attraction festival tour. By this time, PF Records was also releasing albums by several other local bands, including The Caspers, Los Seamonsters, Gigantis and The Dinner Is Ruined. Kombinator also garnered the band its first Juno Award nomination, for Best Alternative Album at the Juno Awards of 1996.

Around this time the band became the object of a bidding war between Sub Pop and TAG Recordings. Because their friends in the bands Jale and The Hardship Post, who were both signed to Sub Pop, were reporting that their relationships with the label were souring, The Inbreds chose to sign with TAG. O'Neill also said the duo wouldn't sign to Sub Pop because the label wanted the duo to add a guitarist to the band. That label rereleased Kombinator in the United States, and brought them on a tour.

Their third album, It's Sydney or the Bush, was produced by 4AD's Lincoln Fong and presented a more traditional rock sound which expanded from their traditional bass and drums approach. Shortly after the release, however, TAG Recordings folded. The band carried on, capturing nominations for Best Alternative Band from the East Coast Music Awards and Best Alternative Album at the Juno Awards of 1997.

Winning Hearts, the band's fourth and final album, was released in 1998 on Sloan's Murderecords. With its return to the simple, bass and drums style of their earlier albums, Winning Hearts held the number one spot on Chart Magazine's survey of Canadian campus radio for two consecutive months. Around this time the band appeared on the bill at Edgefest.

After several months of touring and promotions behind Winning Hearts, O'Neill and Ullrich unexpectedly decided to retire the band, playing their final show in summer 1998.

== Post-breakup ==
O'Neill and Ullrich have both released material since the breakup of the Inbreds, O'Neill as a solo artist and Ullrich with the band Egger. Several CDs containing rare and unreleased Inbreds material were subsequently released on Ullrich's independent label Zunior in 2004. In 2005, they performed a one-off reunion set at a Zunior concert at Lee's Palace.

In 2007, Ullrich and O'Neill reformed the band to record a version of "Dope Fiends and Booze Hounds" for the Rheostatics tribute album The Secret Sessions, their first new recording since their 1998 breakup. O'Neill went on to play the character Thomas Collins in the seventh season of Canadian television show Trailer Park Boys and still resides in Halifax. In the same year, Wanna Be Your Friend: A Tribute to the Inbreds was also released, featuring covers of Inbreds songs by artists including Chris Murphy, In-Flight Safety, The Superfantastics, Ruby Jean and the Thoughtful Bees, and Ruth Minnikin. The album also featured three bonus tracks of the Inbreds themselves performing covers, including "Dope Fiends and Booze Hounds" alongside The Everly Brothers' "Cathy's Clown" and The Super Friendz' "Down in Flames".

The Inbreds have reunited several times in recent years for live performances, playing at the Herohill Hearts Music showcase in October 2008, as well as taking part in the 2008 Halifax Pop Explosion. In 2012, the band reunited for two shows, with the first taking place in Toronto on March 24 at Lee's Palace as part of Canadian Music Week. It was the band's first performance in Toronto in over seven years. Their second show of 2012 was at the Lawnya Vawnya festival in St. John's on April 20, marking the first time the band had ever played Newfoundland. In September 2017 the band also performed in Prince Edward County, Ontario, at the Sandbanks Music Festival, on a bill headlined by Great Lake Swimmers.

They performed another reunion show at Toronto's Gladstone Hotel on September 29, 2016, to promote vinyl reissues of their albums Kombinator, It's Sydney or the Bush and Winning Hearts on Label Obscura.

In 2024, Ulrich's band Egger released a new version of "Any Sense of Time", in collaboration with Tim Vesely of Rheostatics and The Violet Archers, for the Music Buddy podcast.

== Discography ==
=== Studio albums ===
- 1993: Hilario
- 1994: Kombinator
- 1996: It's Sydney or the Bush
- 1998: Winning Hearts
- 2004: The Kombinator Demos
- 2004: B-Sides

=== EPs ===
- 1992: Let's Get Together
- 1992: Darn Foul Dog
- 1993: Egrog
- 1993: Split (with the Shermans)
- 1996: Double Yolk

=== Live albums ===
- 2004: 1997 Live in Calgary

=== Singles ===
Title	Year	Album
"Amelia Earhart (Navigator)"	1994	Kombinator
"You Will Know"	1995	Kombinator
"Any Sense of Time"	1995	Kombinator
"North Window"	1996	It's Sydney Or The Bush
"Moustache"	1997	Winning Hearts
"Yelverton Hill"	1997	Winning Hearts

=== DVD ===
- 2004: Home Movies

== See also ==
- Music of Canada
- Canadian rock
- List of Canadian musicians
- List of bands from Canada
- Category:Canadian musical groups
