= Cookie Duster =

Canadian indie rock band

- Origin: Toronto, Ontario, Canada
- Genre: indie rock
- Years active: 1999–2001; 2012–present
- Label: MapleMusic Recordings
- Members: Brendan Canning; Bernard Maiezza; Jeen O'Brien; Matt Murphy; Damon Richardson
- Past members: Evan Cranley; Danko Jones; Spookey Ruben; Ian Blurton

Cookie Duster is a Canadian indie rock band, who were briefly active in Toronto in the late 1990s before reforming with some new members in 2012.

== History ==
Originally formed in the late 1990s by Brendan Canning and Bernard Maiezza after the dissolution of their previous bands hHead and Change of Heart, the band released a self-titled album in 2001 with a lineup that included Evan Cranley, Danko Jones, Spookey Ruben and Ian Blurton, but subsequently went on hiatus as Canning's other project, Broken Social Scene, broke through to mass popularity.

Following Broken Social Scene's announcement in 2011 that they were going on hiatus, Canning and Maiezza revived Cookie Duster, working with a new band lineup including vocalist Jeen O'Brien, guitarist Matt Murphy and drummer Damon Richardson (Danko Jones). Canning, Bernard, Maiezza, O'Brien, Murphy and Richardson released the album When Flying Was Easy in June 2012. The new lineup began performing live in early 2013, making their debut appearance at the Wavelength Music Festival in Toronto.

== Discography ==
- Cookie Duster (2001)
- When Flying Was Easy (2012)
