= Fiachna Ó Braonáin =

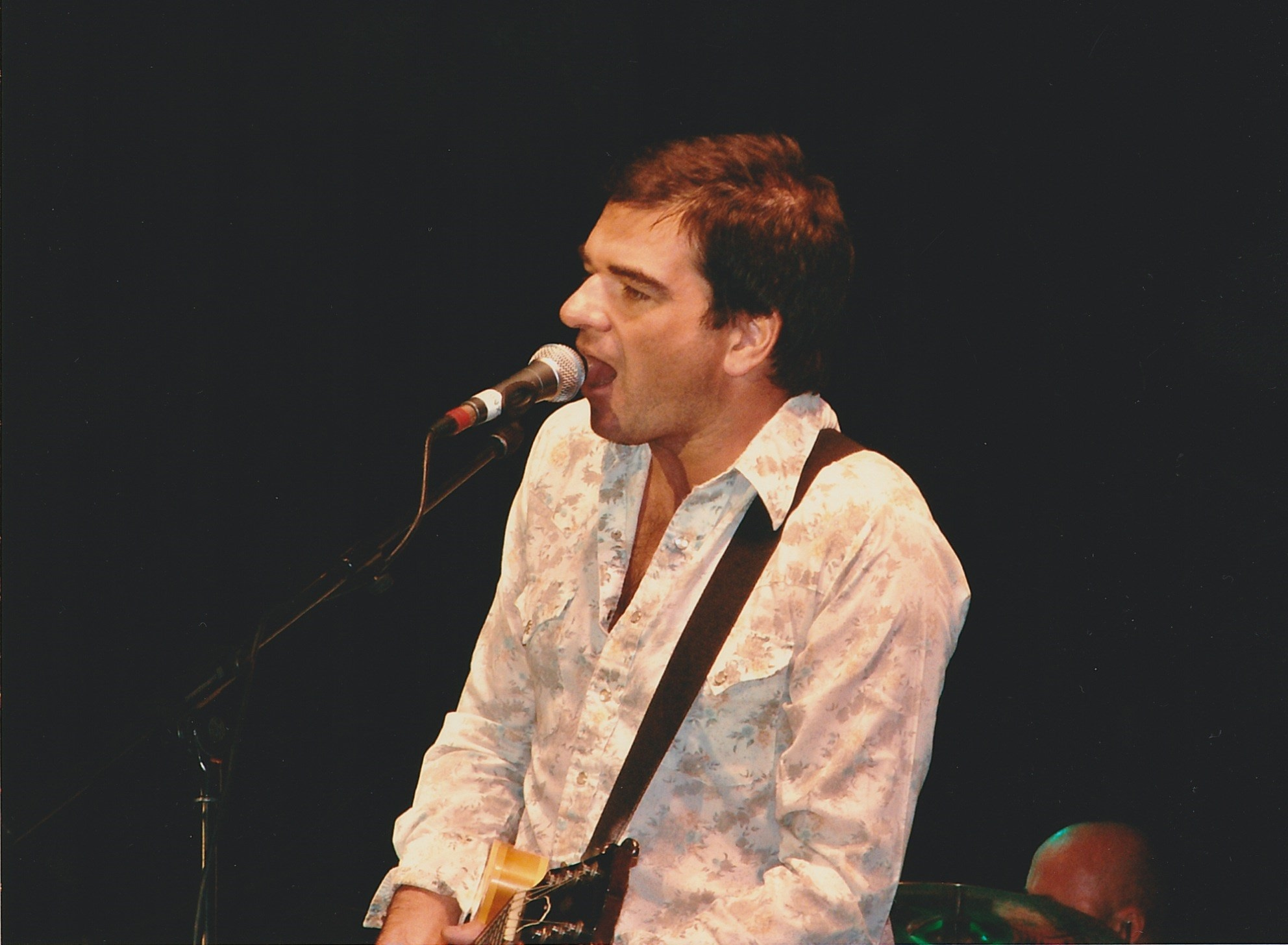
- Braonáin performing with Hothouse Flowers, Guilfest 2005

Background information
- Born: 27 November 1965 (age 59); Dublin, Ireland
- Instrument(s): Vocals, guitar
- Years active: 1985–present
- Labels: London

Fiachna Ó Braonáin (born 27 November 1965) plays the guitar and sings vocals with the Irish band Hothouse Flowers. Born in Dublin, he received his school education at Scoil Lorcáin, Monkstown, County Dublin and Coláiste Eoin, Stillorgan, County Dublin. The Hothouse Flowers were founded as a Dublin street-performance act called the Incomparable Benzini Brothers by Fiachna and his schoolmate Liam Ó Maonlaí.

Fiachna appears on a duet with Belinda Carlisle on her 2007 release, Voila.

In September 2007, he released an album with his other band PreNup. Fellow musicians are Cait O'Riordan (Ex-Pogues) and Dave Clarke (Hothouse Flowers). In addition to that, Fiachna also previously hosted "Poetic Champions", a radio show that aired on Today FM every Sunday night from 7–8pm with the program involving Irish musicians who discuss the various albums that had an influence on them and their careers.

In 2020, he released his first solo album, Bougainvillea.

== Discography ==
=== Solo ===
- Bougainvillea - album, 2020
- Winter Sun - EP, 2020
- Her Coat And No Knickers - single, 2021

=== With Hothouse Flowers ===
- People - 1988 - UK No. 2
- Home - 1990 - UK No. 5
- Songs From the Rain - 1993 - UK No. 7
- Born - 1998
- Live - 1999
- Hothouse Flowers: The Best Of - 2000
- The Vaults: Volume 1 - 2003
- Into Your Heart - 2004
- Hothouse Flowers: The Platinum Collection - 2006

=== With PreNup ===
- Hell to Pay - 2007

=== With Michelle Shocked ===
- Artists Make Lousy Slaves - 1996

=== Guest appearance ===
- Indigo Girls – Indigo Girls (1989)
- Def Leppard – Retro Active (1993)
