= Zunior =

- Founded: 2004
- Founder: Dave Ullrich, Terry Scott
- Genre: Indie
- Country of origin: Canada
- Location: Toronto, Ontario
- Official website: zunior.com

Zunior.com is a Canadian online independent record label and music store founded in 2004 by Dave Ullrich, formerly of The Inbreds.

The store primarily sells digital music from independent artists, in MP3 format without digital rights management protection. Most albums are sold at a price of $8.88 per album, although discounted sale prices are also available on some releases. Customers also have the option of downloading music files in a lossless format (FLAC) at a slightly higher price. The architecture of the Zunior technology is maintained by Ullrich's business partner Terry Scott and runs on the Shopify platform.

Zunior releases are normally also released in conventional CD format on other independent labels, although some albums are also released in download-only format exclusively from Zunior. Some artists, including Rheostatics and Wooden Stars, have also made previously released albums available for download through Zunior.

Each month, Zunior also releases a free sampler compilation of songs by artists with releases available for purchase on the site. The service also frequently releases exclusive compilation albums, including the Rheostatics tribute album The Secret Sessions, a series of annual Christmas-themed albums and Tony Dekker's 2014 covers album Sings 10 Years of Zunior, as fundraising benefits for Toronto's Daily Bread Food Bank.

Zunior also distributes audio recordings of Stuart McLean's Vinyl Cafe books, as well as music-related ebooks.

== See also ==
- List of record labels
