= Dave Ullrich =

Canadian musician and entrepreneur (born c. 1970)

- Born: 1970 (age 55–56); Oshawa, Ontario, Canada
- Origin: Toronto, Ontario, Canada
- Genre: Indie rock
- Occupations: Drummer; Record producer
- Years active: 1992–present
- Formerly of: The Inbreds; Egger

Dave Ullrich (born c. 1970) is a Canadian musician and entrepreneur.

== Early life ==
Ullrich attended O'Neill Collegiate and Vocational Institute in Oshawa, Ontario, and Queens University.

== Career ==
Ullrich performed as drummer and vocalist with bassist Mike O'Neill in the alternative rock duo The Inbreds in the 1990s. The pair released a number of EPs, and singles, as well as seven albums, and were nominated for an East Coast Award and a Juno Award before disbanding in 1998.

Following the band's breakup, Ullrich formed the independent record label Zunior Records, Canada's first online-only music label. "Zunior" is Ullrich's childhood nickname.

In 2005, Ullrich started a band called Egger, with guitarist/singer Paul Linklater, bassist Doug Friesen and drummer/singer Don Kerr. The band features Ullrich's songwriting and singing. Egger released one album, Force Majeure, in 2005, through Zunior Records. The band made one public performance.

In addition to his work with Zunior, Ullrich has worked as an IT consultant.
