= List of musicians from Ontario =

The following is a list of musicians and musical groups from the Canadian province of Ontario.

List of Ontario musicians by genre:

== Uncategorized ==
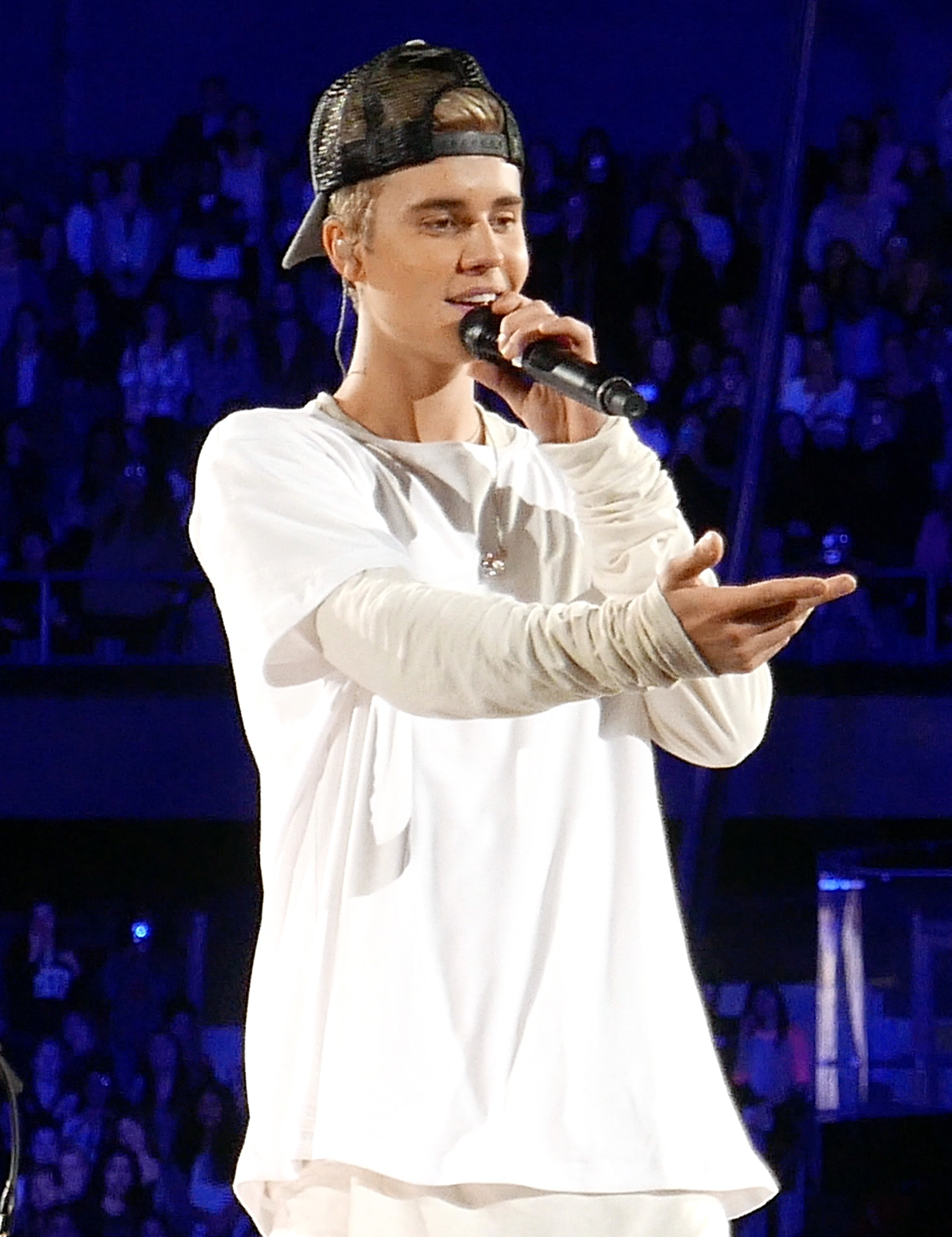
Justin Bieber

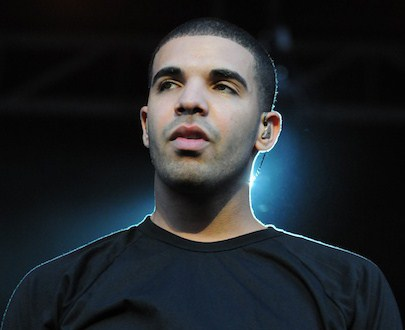
Drake

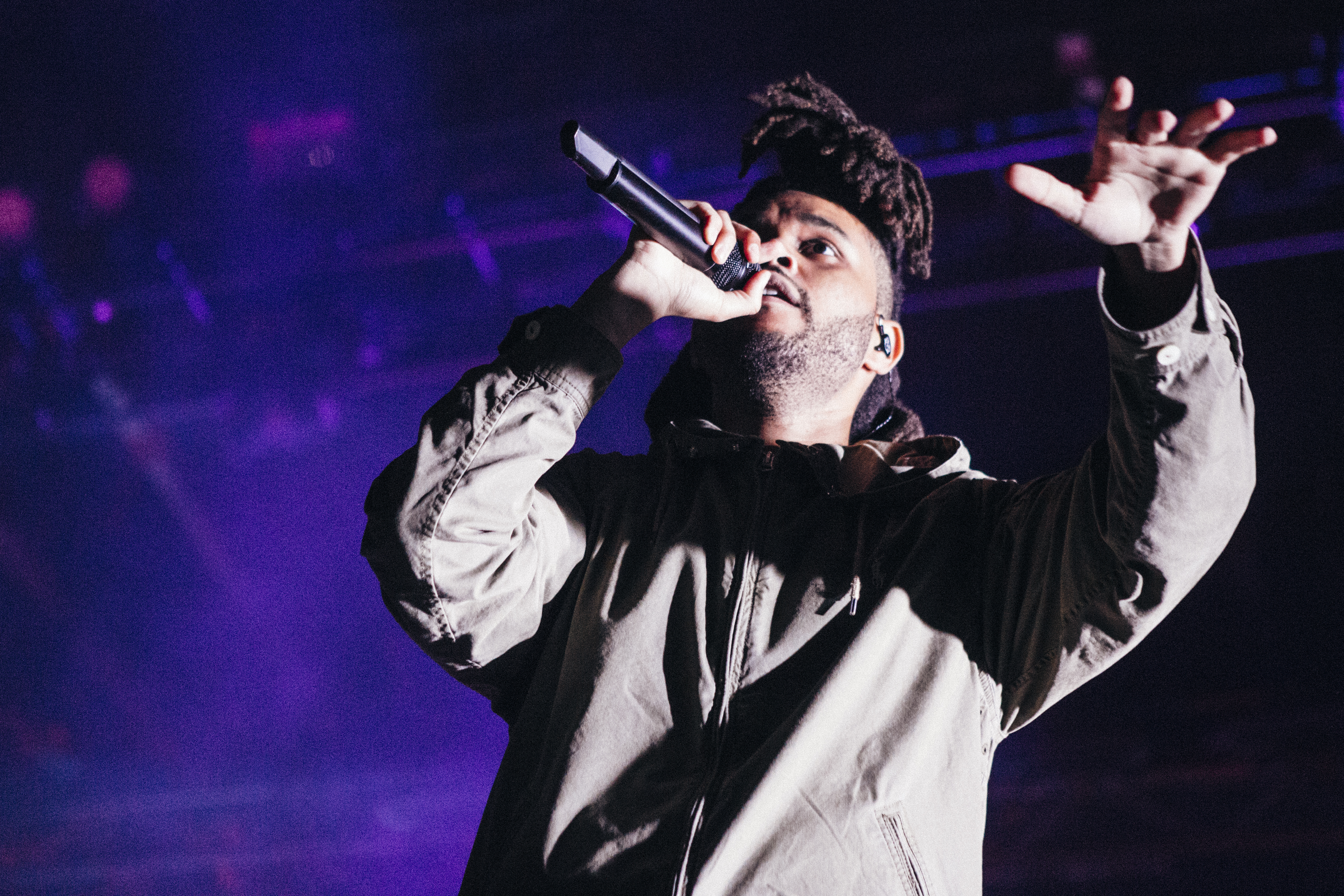
The Weeknd

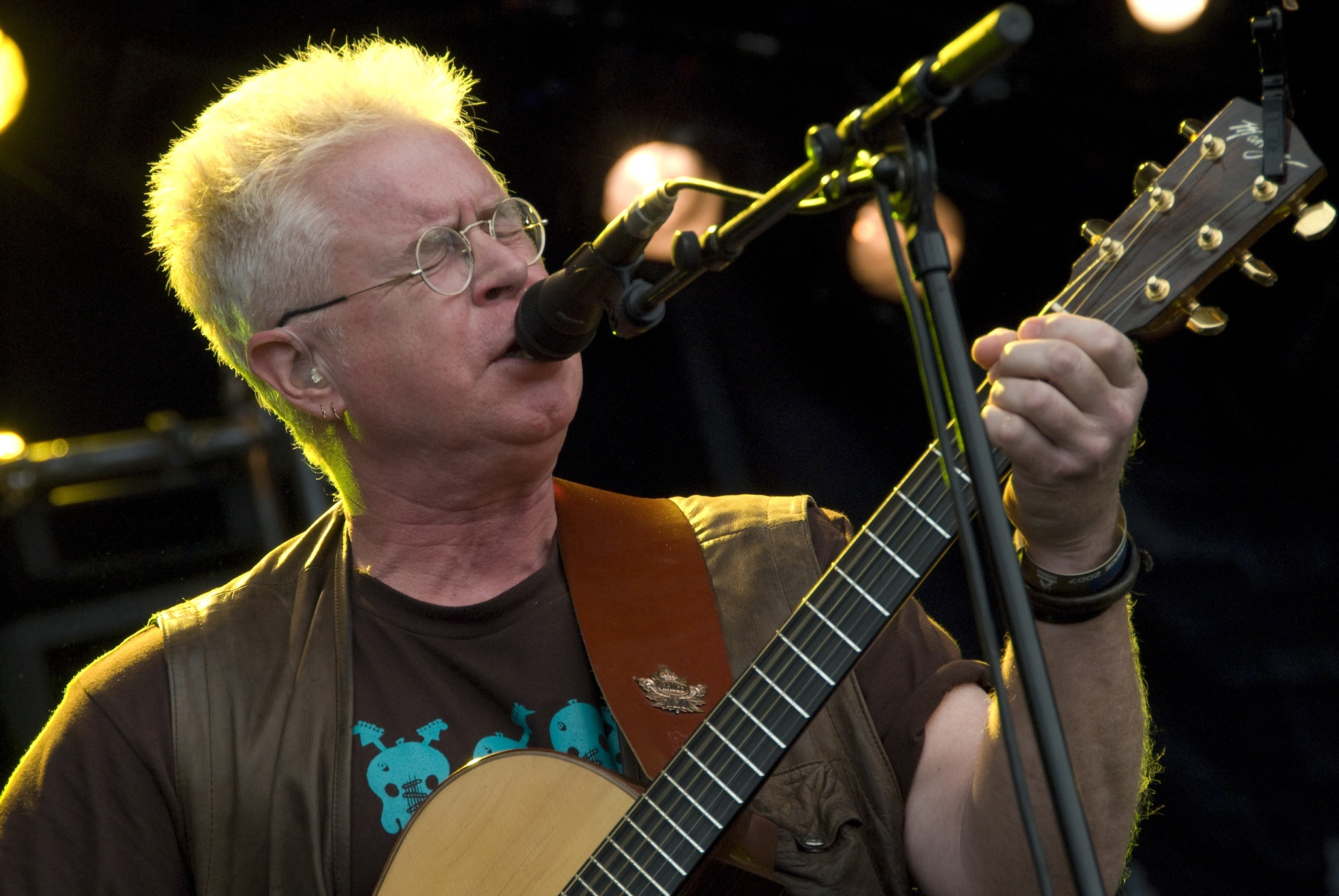
Bruce Cockburn

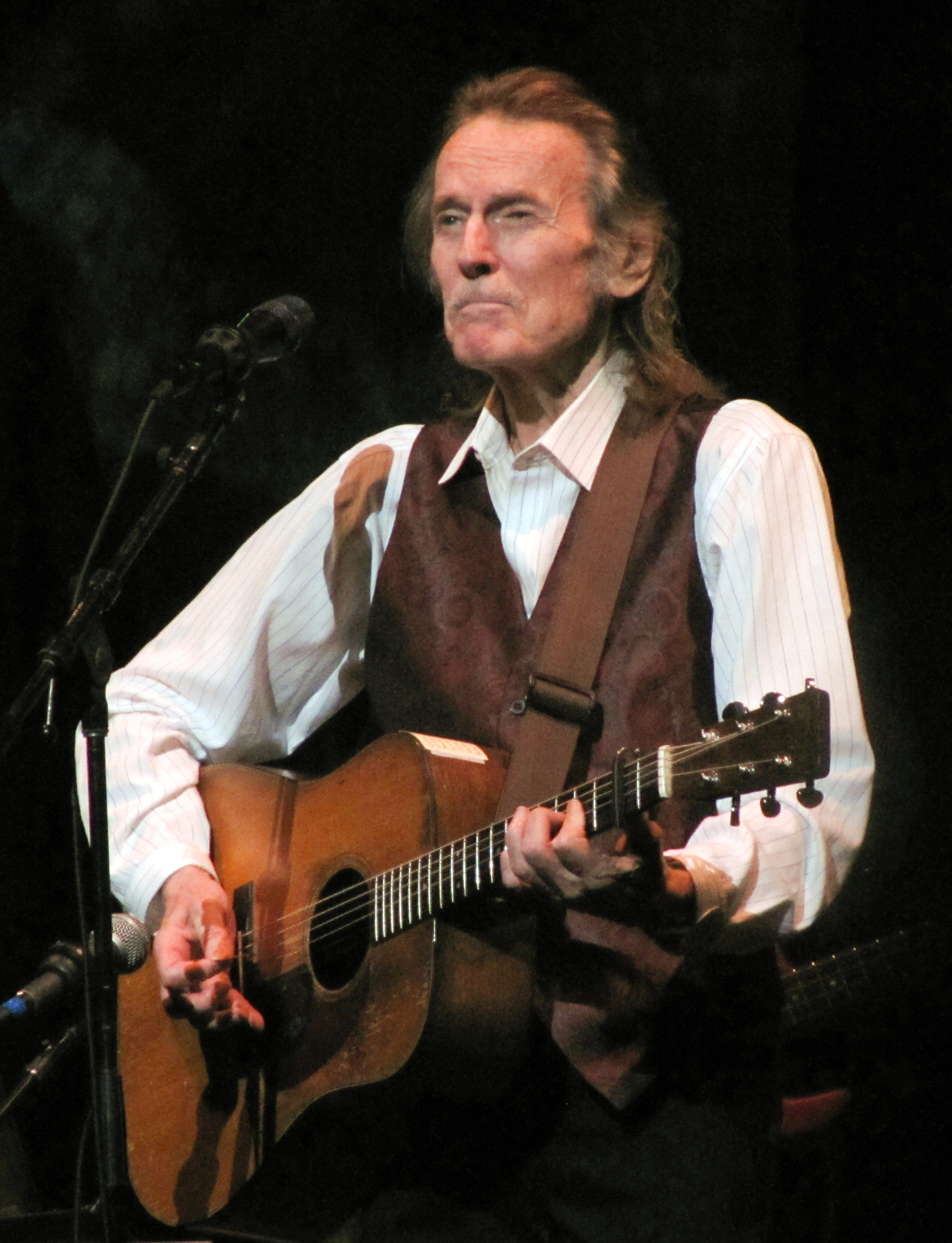
Gordon Lightfoot

- Anders - Mississauga
- Eva Avila – Ottawa
- Bryan Adams – Kingston
- Wild Rivers - Toronto
- The Beau-Marks - Montreal
- Daniel Caesar - Oshawa
- Magic! – Toronto
- Jacksoul - Toronto
- Parichay (singer) - Scarborough, Toronto
- Blue Rodeo – Toronto
- Kevin Spencer - Hamilton
- Keshia Chanté – Ottawa
- Bruce Cockburn – Ottawa
- Deborah Cox – Toronto
- Hugh Dillon – Kingston
- Saga (band) – Oakville
- Wednesday – Oshawa
- J. D. Fortune – Mississauga
- Sarah Harmer – Burlington
- Kardinal Offishall – Scarborough, Toronto
- James LaBrie – Penetanguishene
- Avril Lavigne – Napanee
- Gordon Lightfoot – Orillia
- Lights – Timmins
- Five Man Electrical Band – Ottawa
- Little X – Toronto
- Guy Lombardo – London
- Brian Melo – Hamilton
- Metric – Toronto
- Alanis Morissette – Ottawa
- Joey Muha - Port Dover
- Our Lady Peace – Toronto (Raine Maida attended University of Toronto)
- Peaches – Toronto
- Protest The Hero – Whitby
- Hail The Villain – Oshawa
- Anastasia Rizikov – Toronto
- Rush – Toronto
- Paul Shaffer – Thunder Bay
- Silverstein – Burlington
- Skye Sweetnam – Bolton
- Snow – Toronto
- The Arrogant Worms-Kingston
- The Tragically Hip – Kingston
- Vanity – Niagara Falls
- Tamia Washington – Windsor
- Neil Young – Toronto
- Joel Zimmerman (deadmau5) – Niagara Falls, Ontario
- Vikas Kohli – Mississauga
- Henry Lau – Toronto
- Jeon Somi - Woodstock
- Platinum Blonde – Toronto
- Honeymoon Suite – Niagara Falls
- The Spoons – Burlington
- Tory Lanez - Brampton, Ontario
- List of best-selling singles in Canada
- List of Billboard Hot 100 number-ones by Canadian artists
- Lawrence Gowan - Toronto

== Alt-country ==
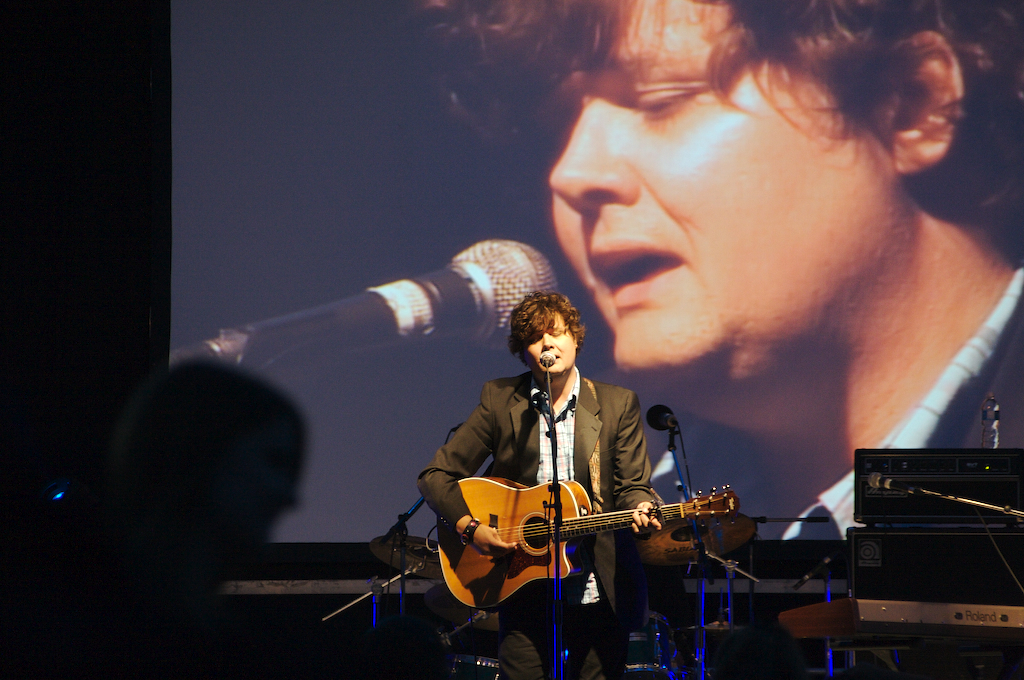
Ron Sexsmith

- Andrew Cash
- Blackie and the Rodeo Kings
- Charlie Angus and Grievous Angels
- Fred Eaglesmith
- Lost Dakotas
- Ron Sexsmith
- The Sadies

== Barbershop ==
- MegaCity Chorus

== Classical ==
- Edwin Orion Brownell
- Glenn Gould

== Contemporary Christian ==
- Article One
- FM Static
- Hawk Nelson
- Manafest
- Newworldson
- Thousand Foot Krutch

== Country and country rock ==
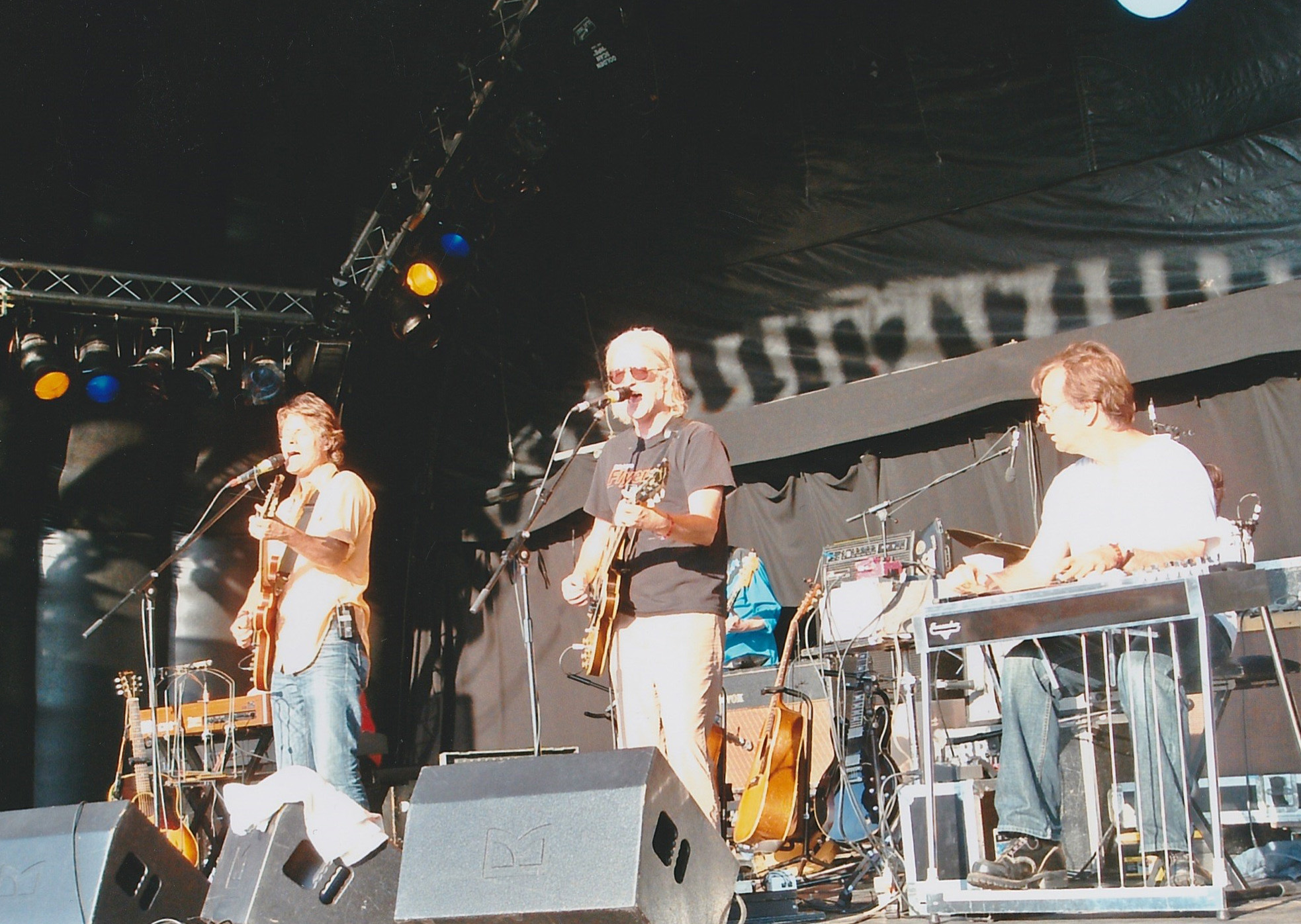
Blue Rodeo

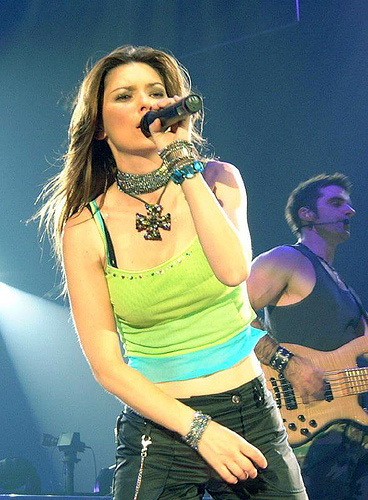
Shania Twain

- Blue Rodeo
- Cowboy Junkies
- Leah Daniels
- Handsome Ned
- Tim Hicks
- Kansas Stone
- Lost Dakotas
- Shae Dupuy
- Prairie Oyster
- Skydiggers
- Shania Twain
- Jason McCoy

== Electronic ==
- Dan Snaith (Caribou/Manitoba/Daphni)

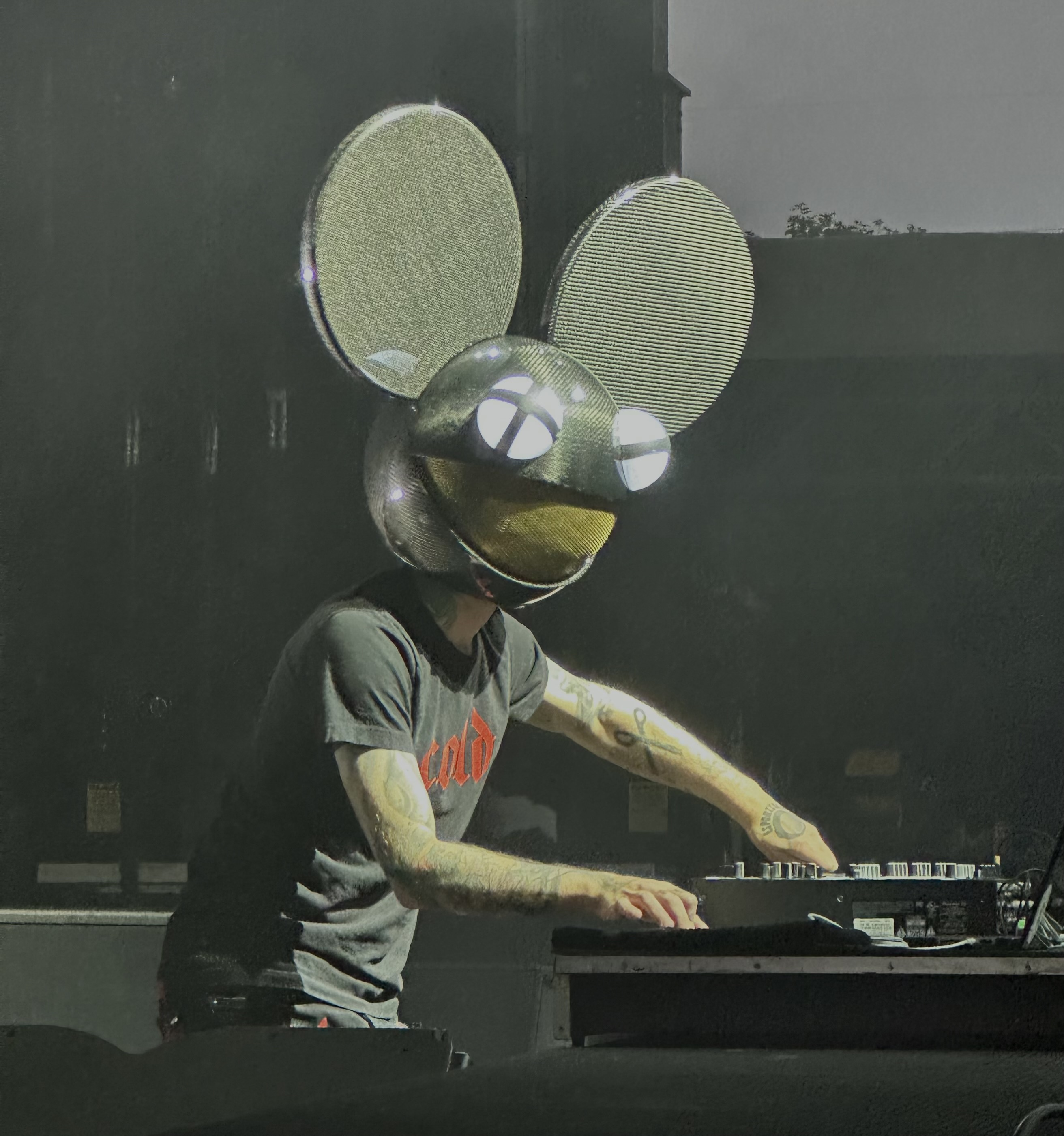
Deadmau5

- Deadmau5
- DVBBS
- Esthero
- Junior Boys
- Kids on TV
- Lesbians on Ecstasy
- Loud Luxury
- MSTRKRFT
- Crystal Castles
- Rezz

== Ethnic / Multicultural ==
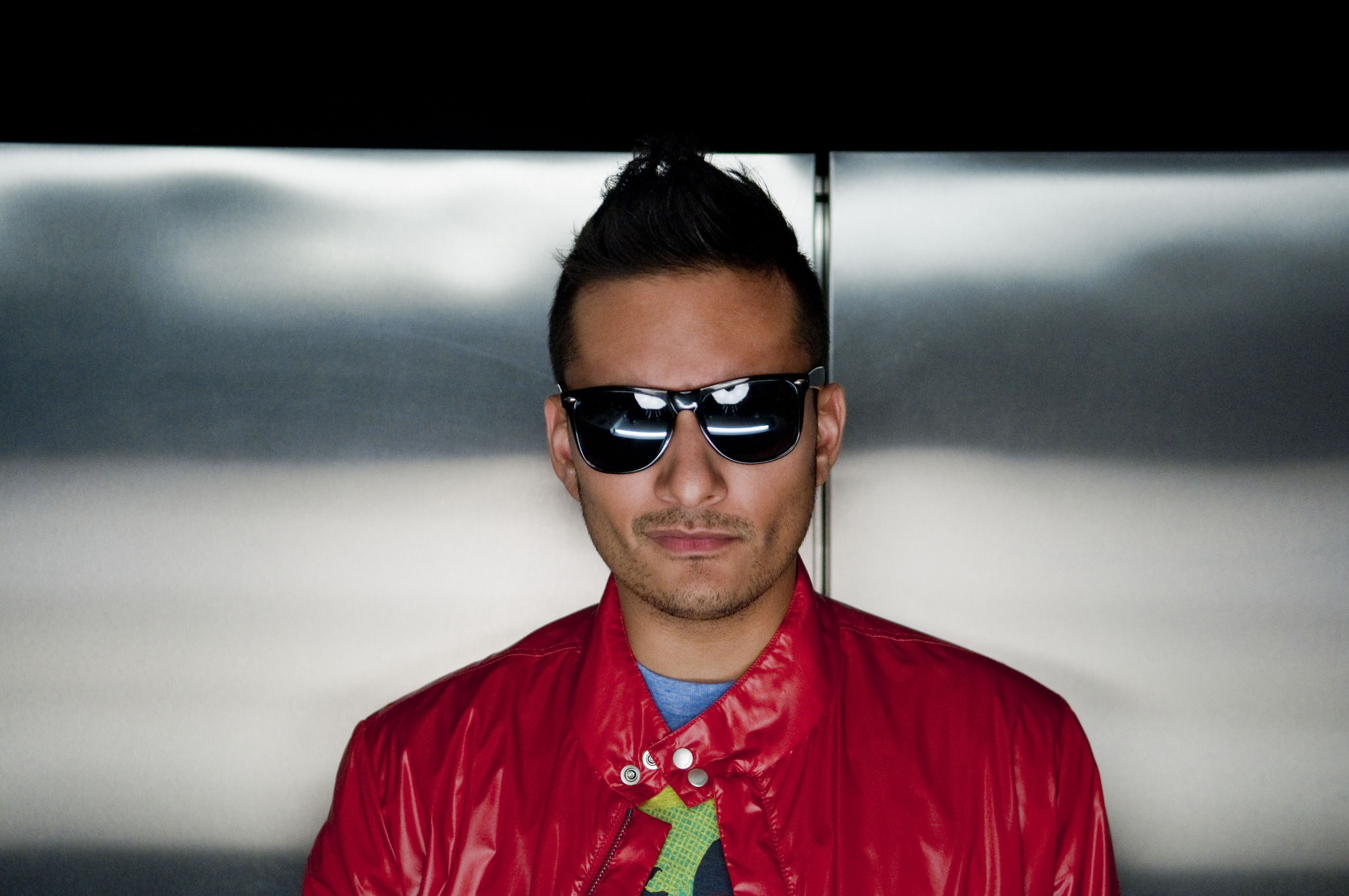
Raghav

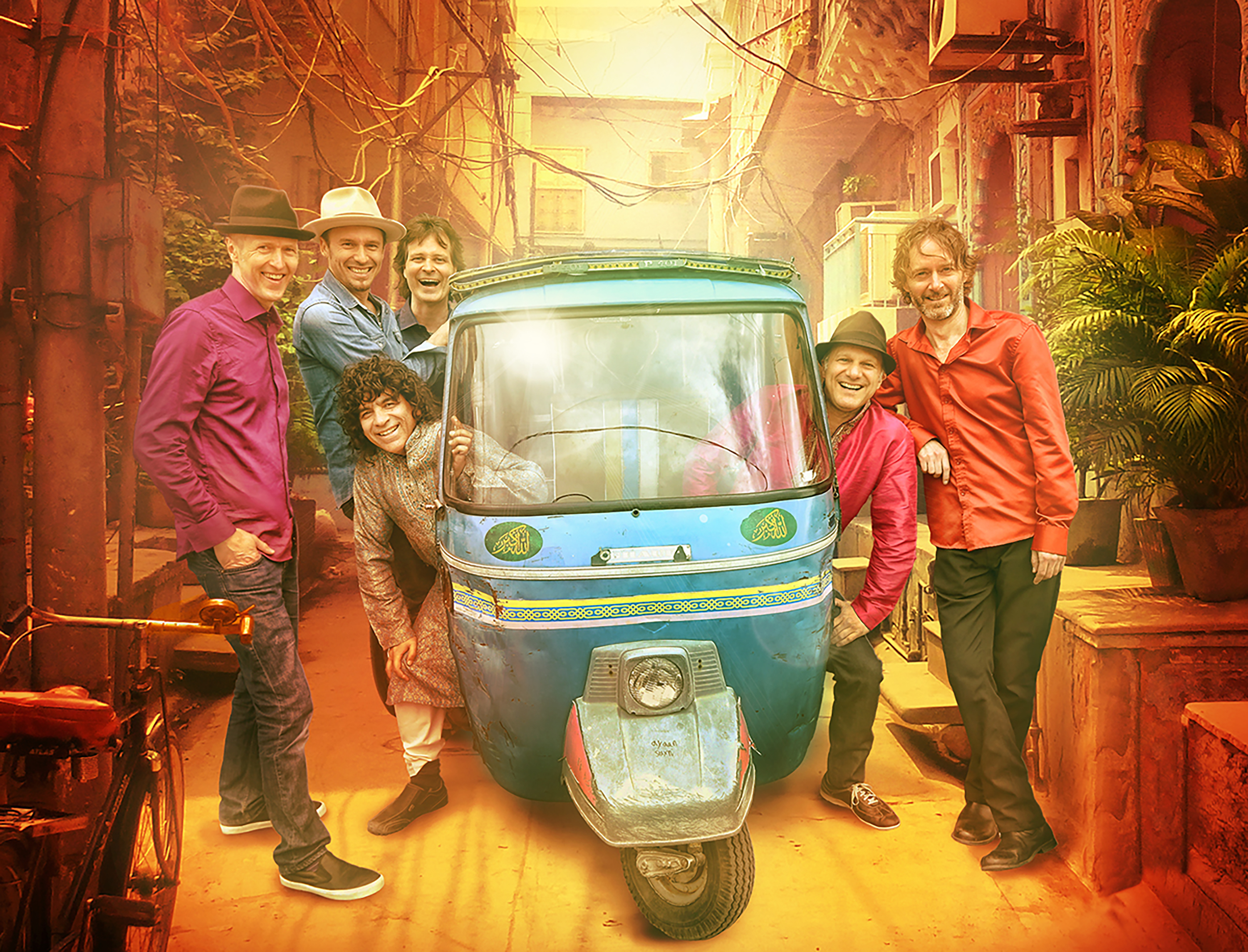
Sultans of String

- AfroNubians
- Bedouin Soundclash
- Beyond the Pale
- Jaffa Road
- Raghav
- Souljazz Orchestra - Ottawa
- Sultans of String
- Vandana Vishwas

== Folk ==
- Ash & Bloom
- Bruce Cockburn
- City & Colour
- Crash Vegas
- Freeman Dre and the Kitchen Party
- Kathleen Edwards
- Justin Hines
- Stephen Fearing
- Great Lake Swimmers
- Emm Gryner
- Sarah Harmer
- Gordon Lightfoot
- Dayna Manning
- Loreena McKennitt
- Moxy Früvous
- Sierra Noble – born in Ottawa, Ontario
- Ian North
- Red Dirt Skinners
- Wade Hemsworth
- Karen James
- Wild Rivers
- Chris McKhool - born in Ottawa, Ontario

== Goth ==
- National Velvet
- The Birthday Massacre

== Hip hop ==
- Choclair
- Dead Celebrity Status
- Drake
- Dream Warriors
- Eternia
- Houdini
- Jazz Cartier
- K'naan
- k-os
- Kardinal Offishall
- Kid Twist
- Maestro
- Michie Mee
- Nav
- Night Lovell
- Pressa
- Saukrates
- Smoke Dawg

== Indie ==
- Born Ruffians
- Broken Social Scene
- By Divine Right
- The Constantines
- Dala
- Dizzy
- Fifth Column
- Furnaceface
- Hayden
- The Hidden Cameras
- Junior Boys
- King Cobb Steelie
- Lights
- Little Junior
- Magneta Lane
- Marlon Chaplin
- Metric
- Old World Vulture
- Republic of Safety
- Rheostatics
- Saya Gray
- Skydiggers
- Sheep Look Up
- Sweet Thing
- Tokyo Police Club – Newmarket

== Industrial ==
- Ad·ver·sary
- Ayria
- Dandi Wind
- Decoded Feedback
- Digital Poodle
- Epsilon Minus
- Monster Voodoo Machine
- Vampire Rodents
- Zombie Girl

== Jazz ==
- John Alcorn
- Jane Bunnett
- Holly Cole
- Molly Johnson
- Richard Underhill

== Metal ==
- Lee Aaron
- Abandon All Ships
- Adytum
- Annihilator
- Anvil
- Arise and Ruin
- Baptized In Blood
- Brand of Sacrifice
- Cancer Bats
- Crimson Shadows
- Dead and Divine
- Eidolon
- Exciter
- Farewell to Freeway
- Helix
- Infernäl Mäjesty
- Killer Dwarfs
- Kittie
- Liferuiner
- Piledriver
- Protest the Hero
- Razor
- Structures
- The End
- Thine Eyes Bleed
- Threat Signal
- Woods of Ypres

== Pop ==
- Alanis Morissette
- Alannah Myles
- Alessia Cara
- Alyssa Reid
- Amanda Marshall
- Annette Ducharme
- Aviva Mongillo
- Avril Lavigne
- B4-4
- Candy Coated Killahz
- Dalbello
- Down With Webster
- Deborah Cox
- Fefe Dobson
- Jane Siberry
- Justin Bieber
- Love Inc.
- Martha and the Muffins
- One to One
- The Partland Brothers
- Paul Anka
- Prozzak
- Scott Helman
- Shawn Mendes
- Virginia to Vegas

== Punk ==
- The 3tards
- Alexisonfire
- Armed and Hammered
- Bad Waitress
- Billy Talent
- Bunchofuckingoofs
- Cauterize
- Counterparts
- Dear Jane, I...
- The Diodes
- The Flatliners
- The Forgotten Rebels
- Fucked Up
- Grade
- illScarlett – Mississauga
- Jolly Tambourine Man
- Like Pacific
- Moneen
- Pkew pkew pkew
- PUP
- Seaway
- Silverstein
- Simply Saucer
- Sum 41
- Teenage Head
- The Dirty Nil
- The Fully Down
- Treble Charger- Sault Ste. Marie
- The Viletones

== Rock and alternative ==
- 13 Engines
- Arkells
- The Band
- Barenaked Ladies
- Barstool Prophets
- Basement Revolver
- Big House
- Big Sugar
- Billy Talent
- Bleeker
- CANO
- Change of Heart
- Cleopatrick - Cobourg
- Coney Hatch
- Danko Jones
- Death From Above 1979
- Jason Englishman
- Finger Eleven
- FM
- Frozen Ghost
- Goddo
- Hail The Villain
- Harem Scarem
- Ronnie Hawkins
- Hawksley Workman
- Jeff Healey
- High Holy Days
- Hollerado
- I Mother Earth
- Joydrop
- Junkhouse
- The Killjoys - Hamilton
- The Kings
- Graeme Kirkland
- Daniel Lanois
- Leslie Spit Treeo
- The Lowest of the Low
- Max Webster
- Metric
- Kim Mitchell
- Mary Margaret O'Hara
- My Darkest Days – Toronto
- National Velvet
- Neil Young
- Our Lady Peace
- Parachute Club
- Project Wyze
- Red Rider
- Redlight King
- Rough Trade
- Rush
- Saga (band)
- Lorraine Segato
- Sarah Slean
- Steppenwolf
- Skye Sweetnam
- Sumo Cyco
- Teenage Head
- The Argues
- The Black Maria
- The Glorious Sons - Kingston
- The Headstones
- The Noolands
- The Pursuit of Happiness
- The Tea Party
- The Tragically Hip
- Ian Thornley
- Three Days Grace
- Toronto
- Triumph
- Wednesday

== R&B ==
- Toya Alexis
- Bass is Base
- Jully Black
- Divine Brown
- Jarvis Church
- Jacksoul
- Glenn Lewis
- Billy Newton-Davis
- The Philosopher Kings
- Ivana Santilli
- The Weeknd
- PARTYNEXTDOOR
- Roy Woods

== See also ==
- Music of Ontario
