= Heavy Eyes =

Heavy Eyes may refer to:

- Heavy Eyes (album), a 2018 album by Basement Revolver
- "Heavy Eyes" (Zach Bryan song), 2022
- "Heavy Eyes", a 2008 song from Rosewood Thieves
- "Heavy Eyes", a song from the 1953 film Julius Caesar
- "Heavy Eyes", a song by The Microphones from their 2002 release Song Islands
- "Heavy Eyes", a 2008 song by Oh Land from Fauna
- The Heavy Eyes, an American rock band
