= The Cameron House =

Live music entertainment venue, Toronto

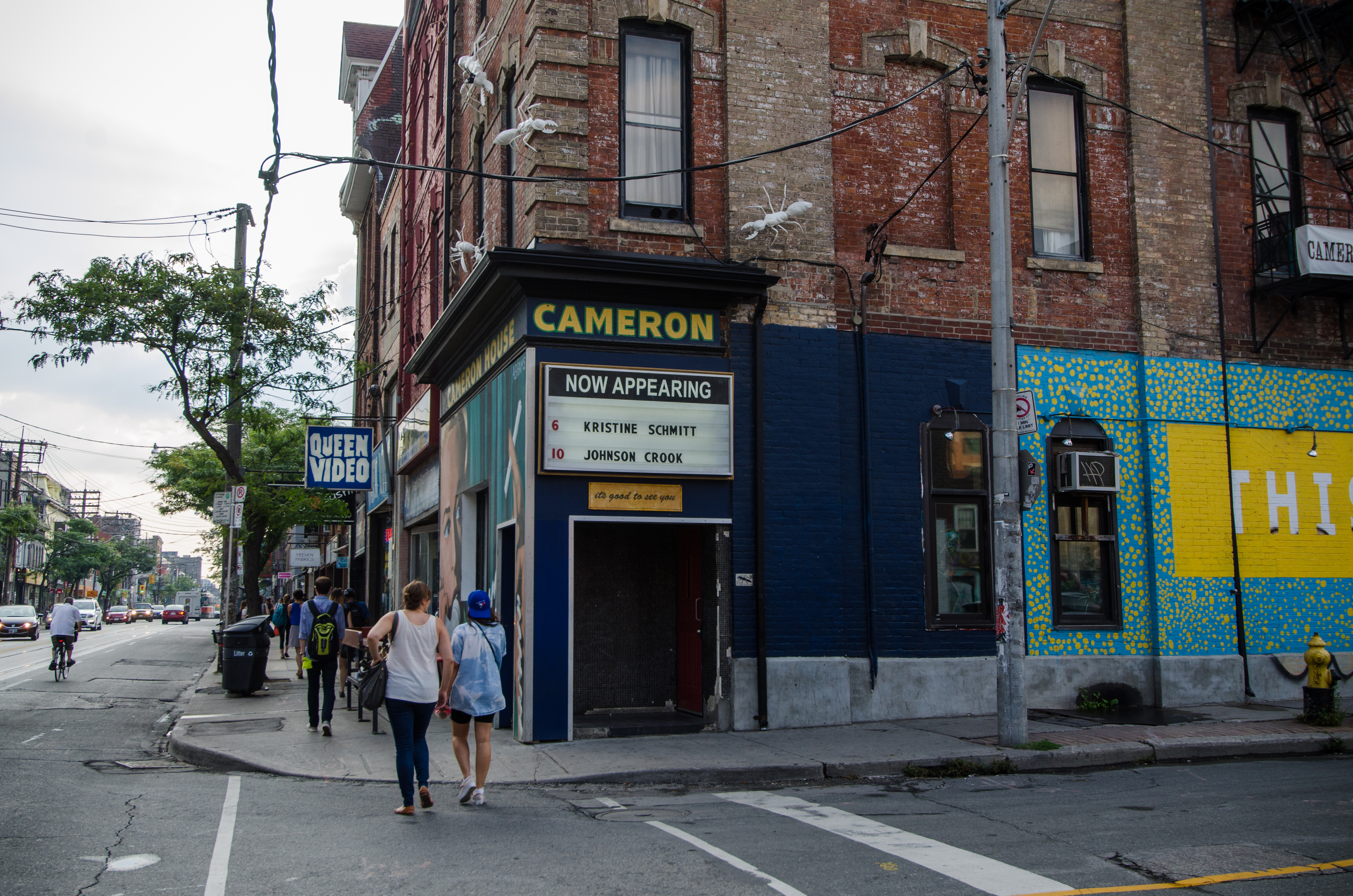
- The Cameron House in September 2015
- Interactive map of The Cameron House
- Address: 408 Queen Street West; Toronto, Ontario; M5V 2A7
- Coordinates: 43°38′55″N 79°23′51″W
- Owner: Ferraro family
- Capacity: 70
- Type: Bar, Music venue
- Event: Alternative

Construction
- Built: 1880
- Opened: October 1981

Website
- www.thecameron.com

The Cameron House is a small bar, live music venue, and informal cultural centre located on Queen Street West, just west of Spadina Avenue, in the downtown core of Toronto, Ontario, Canada. The Cameron has a front lounge and a back room, both with the capacity for audiences of no more than sixty people. It has been described as a Toronto crossover of CBGB's and the Chelsea Hotel in New York.

== History ==
The building that today houses the Cameron House was constructed in 1880. In that year, it was # 396 Queen Street, and the other half of the building, #398, was under construction. The land to the immediate west of the buildings was a vacant field. In 1881, Angus Cameron moved into #398 and opened a dry goods store on the premises. The other half of the building remained unoccupied. Cameron lived above the shop, his mother living nearby in one of the houses on the street that now bears her family name. By the year 1888, the shop became the “Ryan and Sullivan Tailor Shop.” In 1890, the store was vacant, but the following year, E. Hodd moved in and opened a furnishings shop. In 1895, the structure became the “John Burns Hotel.”

In 1896, it became the Cameron House. First opened as a working hotel in the early 1920s, since October 1981 the Cameron has been a community-based space for music, performance, and visual art. Launched by Paul Sannella, his sister Anne Marie Ferraro and their best friend, Herb Tookey, the venue is now owned and operated by Ferraro's children Annalise and Tally.

== Notable acts ==
The following notable acts have performed at The Cameron House:

- Blue Rodeo
- Jane Siberry
- Ron Sexsmith
- Shane Pendergast
- Molly Johnson
- Gordie Johnson
- Holly Cole
- Barenaked Ladies
- The Meligrove Band
- Lorraine Segato
- Willie P. Bennett
- The Government
- Fifth Column
- Mary Margaret O'Hara
- Handsome Ned
- The Golden Dogs
- Deanne Taylor
- Freeman Dre and the Kitchen Party
- Suitcase Sam
- Marlon Chaplin
- The Violent Brothers

== Recent ==
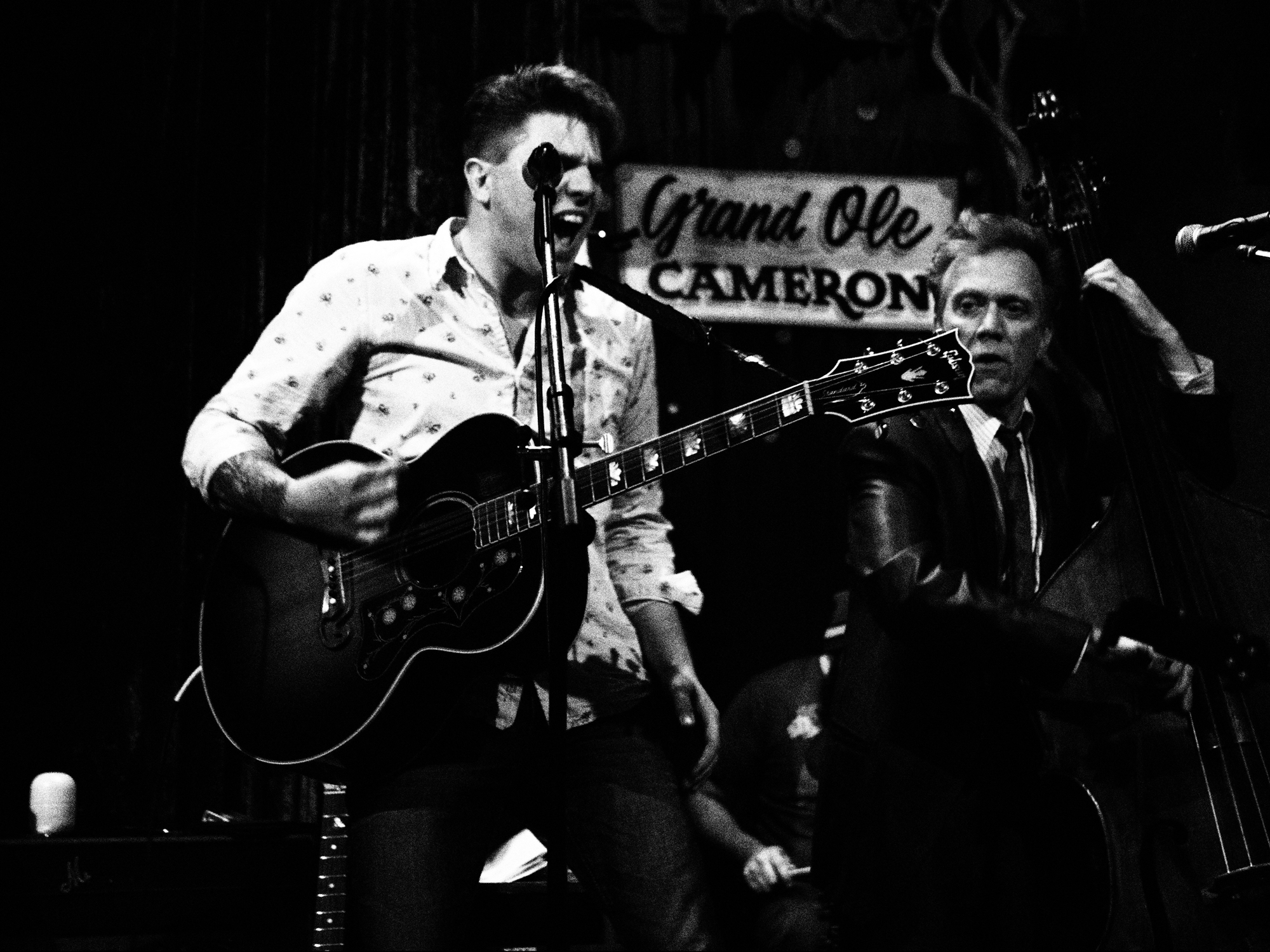
Jesse Adamson performing on the main stage in 2014

House acts at the Cameron in 2005 included The Cameron Family Singers, The DoneFors, The Countrypolitans, Run With the Kittens, The Backstabbers, and Kevin Quain and the Mad Bastards. Recent acts include The Devin Cuddy Band, The Double Cuts, Colonel Tom and The American Pour, John Borra, Big Tobacco and The Pickers, David Celia, Patrick Brealey, Ferraro, Lori Yates and Hey Stella, Doug Paisley, Jay Swinn, and David Baxter.

In 2011, the Cameron House served as a launching pad for Cameron House Records, a new record label.
