= The Dakota Tavern =

Bar in Toronto, Canada

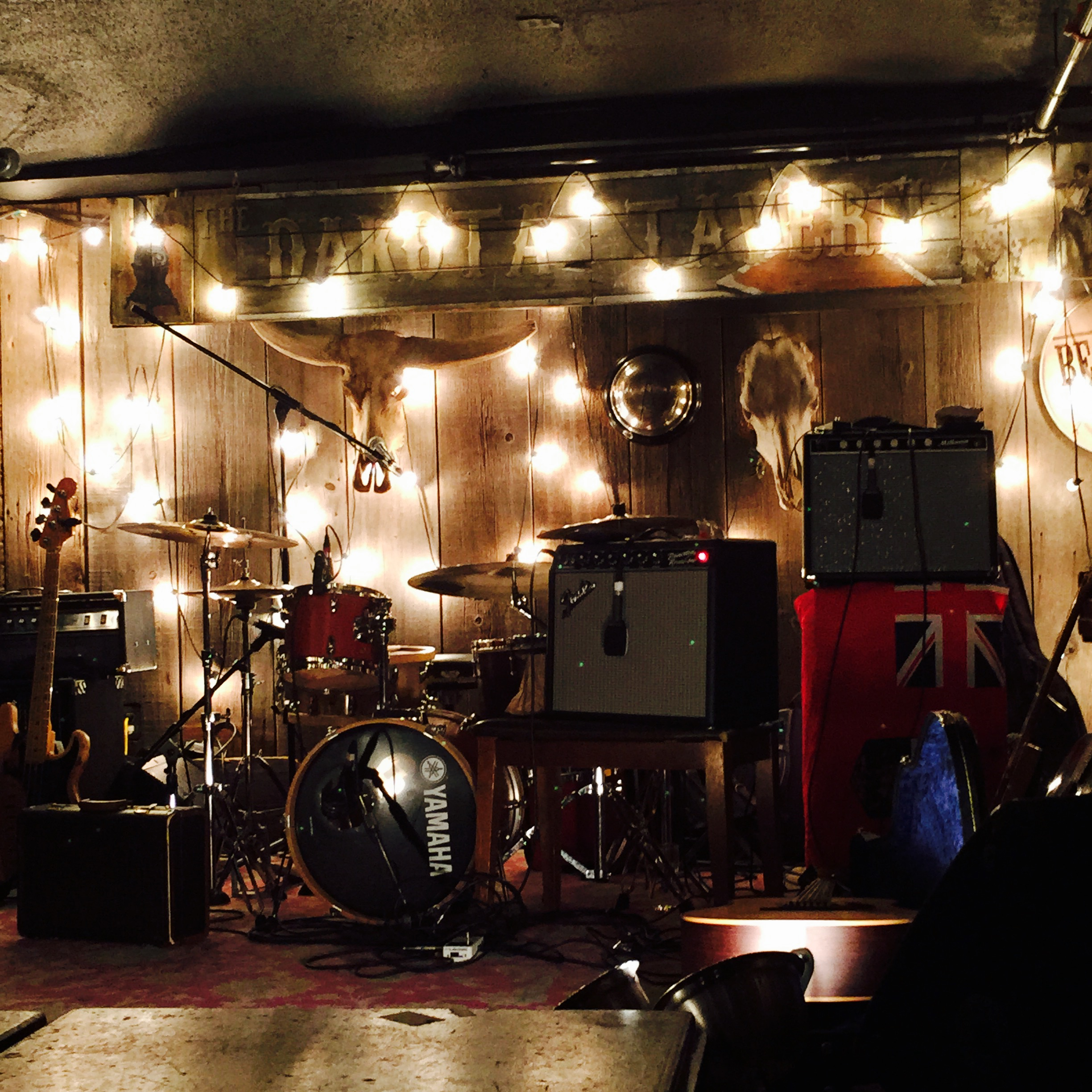
- The stage of The Dakota Tavern in 2014
- Interactive map of The Dakota Tavern
- Address: 249 Ossington Ave; Toronto, Ontario; M6J 3A1; Toronto; Canada
- Coordinates: 43.649770°N 79.420630°W
- Owner: Shawn Creamer; Shannon Kohlmeier; Stephen Reid
- Capacity: 130
- Type: Music Venue
- Events: Bluegrass; Country music Rock and roll

Construction
- Opened: 2006
- Years active: 2006-2024

Website
- thedakotatavern.com

The Dakota Tavern was a live music venue and bar in Toronto, Ontario, Canada.

== History ==
The Dakota opened in December 2006. It was co-owned by business partners Shawn Creamer and Shannon Kohlmeier. It is located in the Little Portugal neighbourhood of Toronto.

The bar participated as a venue yearly for North by Northeast. The venue also hosts a recurring event on weekends called Bluegrass Brunch.

In 2020, owners of the bar expressed concerns about rising insurance prices during the COVID-19 pandemic in Toronto and considered closing.

In October 2024 it was sold to new owners, 1001020185 Ontario Inc., and closed temporarily. In March 2025, media reports said that the new owners planned to replace the Dakota with a new business, Mickey Limbos.

== Notable acts ==
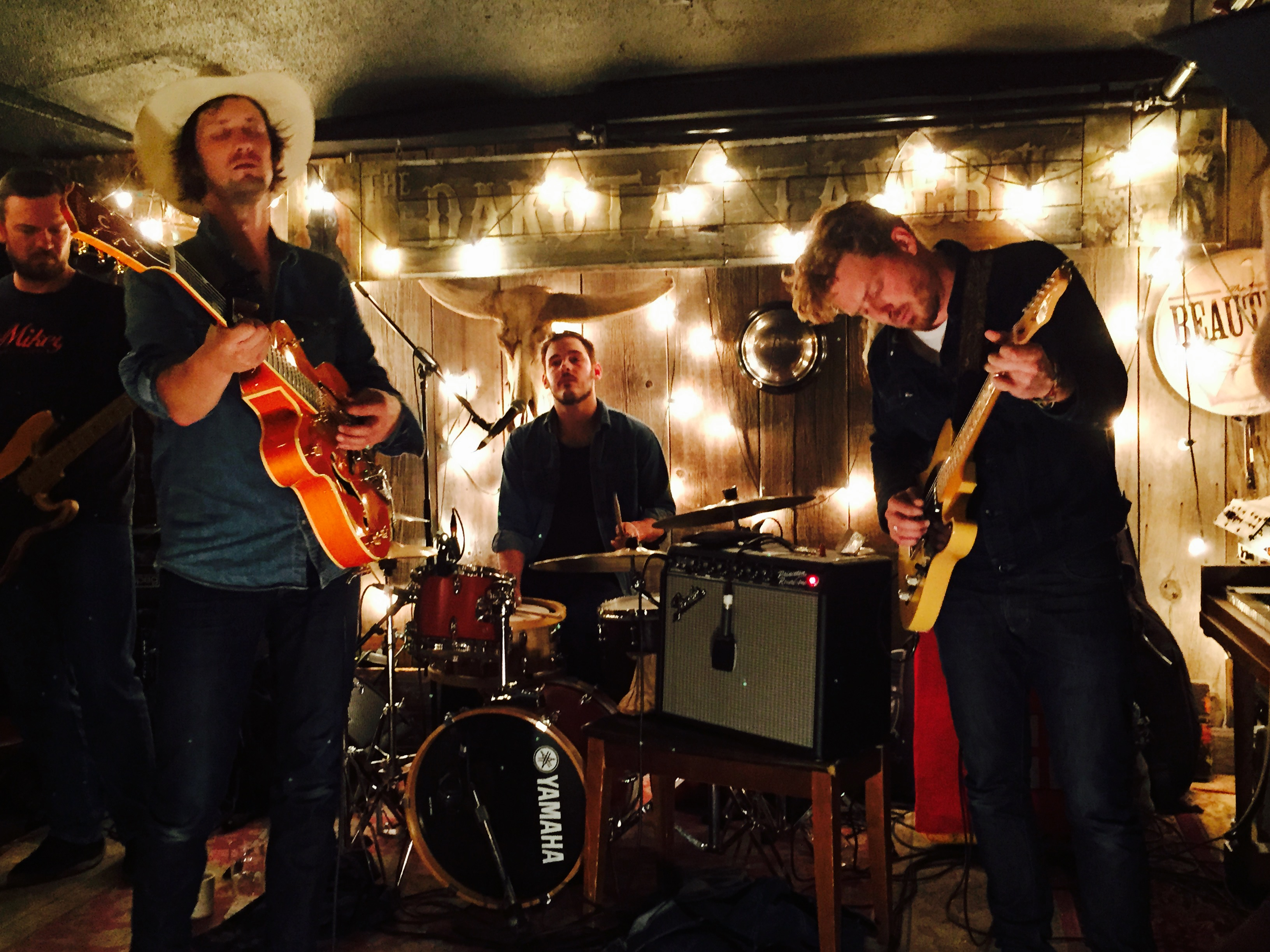
Del Barber performing at The Dakota Tavern in 2014

- Skydiggers
- Ron Sexsmith
- Blue Rodeo
- Broken Social Scene
- Kathleen Edwards
- Luke Doucet
- Cowboy Junkies
- The Sadies
- Marlon Chaplin
- Freeman Dre and the Kitchen Party
- Suitcase Sam
- Lady A
- Jason Collett
- Barenaked Ladies
- Lindi Ortega
- Corb Lund
- Gord Downie
- The Avett Brothers
- Slow Down, Molasses
- Sleepy Sun
- Tuns
- Del Barber

== House band ==
The house band for the venue are The Beauties.
