= Megacity (disambiguation) =

A megacity is a very large city metropolitan area, typically with a population of more than 10 million people.

Megacity or Mega City may also refer to:

- Megacity (video game), a 2011 mobile video game
- Mega City (car), by French automobile manufacturer Aixam-Mega
- Mega City Vehicle, a former name of the BMW i3
- Mega City (shopping mall), a shopping mall in New Taipei, Taiwan
- Toronto, known as "Megacity" after the 1998 amalgamation of Toronto
- Mega City, a French quadricycle

== See also ==
- Megalopolis, a group of two or more roughly adjacent metropolitan areas
- Mega-City One and Mega-City Two, fictional locations in the Judge Dredd series
- Mega City Four, an English indie rock band
- BMW Mega City Vehicle, now BMW i3
- MegaCity Chorus, a Canadian men's music group
