= Music of Ontario =

Overview of the music of Ontario

As the Canadian province with the largest population, Ontario has a particularly prominent role in Canadian music. The provincial capital city of Toronto, Canada's largest municipality, is home to much of the English Canadian music industry and many individual musicians, and the most popular destination for musicians from other parts of Canada, besides French-Canadian musicians, looking to advance their careers. Toronto also supports Canadian music as the centre of English language media in Canada. Hamilton, Ottawa, Kingston and Guelph have also been important centres for Canadian music.

In classical music, the Toronto Symphony Orchestra and the Ottawa-based National Arts Centre Orchestra are two of the most renowned orchestras in the world. Many smaller Ontario cities have orchestras of their own as well. The Canadian Opera Company based in Toronto is the country's largest and most influential producer of opera productions.

Other institutions in the province include the Royal Conservatory of Music, MuchMusic, and concert venues such as Roy Thomson Hall, Massey Hall and the National Arts Centre. Record labels in the province include MapleMusic, DROG Records, Duke Street, Sonic Unyon, Three Gut, Zunior, Linus Entertainment, and the Canadian divisions of most major international labels.

== Ontario music organizations ==
- Central Ontario Musicians' Association
- Country Music Association of Ontario
- Folk Music Ontario
- MusicOntario
- Ontario Arts Council
- Ontario Music Association
- Toronto Alliance for the Performing Arts
- Toronto Musicians' Association
- Toronto Symphony Orchestra
- Ontario Music Festivals Association

== Music festivals ==
- Boots and Hearts Music Festival
- Burlington's Sound of Music Festival
- Goderich Celtic Roots Festival
- Hamilton Supercrawl
- Havelock Country Jamboree
- Mariposa Folk Festival
- Northern Lights Festival Boréal
- Ottawa Bluesfest
- OVO Fest
- Rock the Park

== Music education ==
Schools of music in Ontario include, at the university level:

- Don Wright Faculty of Music, University of Western Ontario, London
- Queen's School of Music, Queen's University, Kingston
- University of Toronto Faculty of Music, University of Toronto (St. George campus), Toronto

At the higher education level excluding universities:

- Conservatory Canada, London
- Fanshawe College's Music Industry Arts program, Fanshawe College, London
- The Glenn Gould School, Toronto
- Harris Institute of Music, Toronto
- Humber College Faculty of Media and Creative Arts, Toronto
- Metalworks Institute, Mississauga
- Pandit Jasraj Institute of Music Toronto
- The Royal Conservatory of Music, Toronto
- Trebas Institute, Toronto

Closed institutions:

- Canadian Conservatory of Music, Ottawa
- Royal Hamilton College of Music

== Musicians ==
For a list of musicians and musical groups from Ontario, please see List of Ontario musicians.
