= Weldon Chan =

Weldon Chan (born c. 1919/20) was a British subject from Hong Kong who became an illegal immigrant to Canada noted for avoiding deportation for over three years. He became the subject of a manhunt by the Royal Canadian Mounted Police (RCMP), but was eventually allowed to stay in the country and was granted landed immigrant status.

Chan, his wife, and his daughter Alice came to Vancouver, British Columbia, on a tourist visa in 1958. They applied to become landed immigrants after a few months, but their application was rejected because they were not considered eligible for admission. As a result, when their first visa expired they were deemed illegal immigrants and ordered deported in 1959. To avoid being forced to leave the country, Weldon Chan went into hiding; he had "vowed...he would never be deported".

The RCMP spent three years trying to locate Chan, both in Canada and in Chinese-American communities in Seattle and San Francisco. The government decided not to deport his wife and daughter until Weldon was located, so Mrs. Chan began working at a cafeteria at the University of British Columbia and Alice enrolled in a private Roman Catholic elementary school. In 1963, Immigration Minister Guy Favreau granted Chan a one-year residency permit and suggested that he be granted landed immigrant status. This was later cited as evidence of Favreau's promise to "eliminate any prejudice in immigration matters".

Arthur W. Hughes wrote a folk song, "The Ballad of Weldon Chan," satirizing the efforts by the Canadian government to find and deport Chan. The song was intended to object to "unjust treatment of an allegedly illegal Chinese immigrant" and bring "attention to the long history of racist, anti-Chinese immigration policies in Canada". "The Story of Weldon Chan" was recorded by folk singer Karen James on her self-titled album in 1961. It was released as part of the Smithsonian Folkways collection Classic Canadian Songs; one reviewer called it "the one you won't be able to get out of your head".
