= Kitchen Party =

Kitchen Party can refer to:

- Kitchen Party (film), a 1997 film written and directed by Gary Burns
- Kitchen Party (group), a British girl group
- Freeman Dre and the Kitchen Party, a band from Toronto, Ontario
