= Lee's Palace =

Rock concert hall in Toronto, Canada

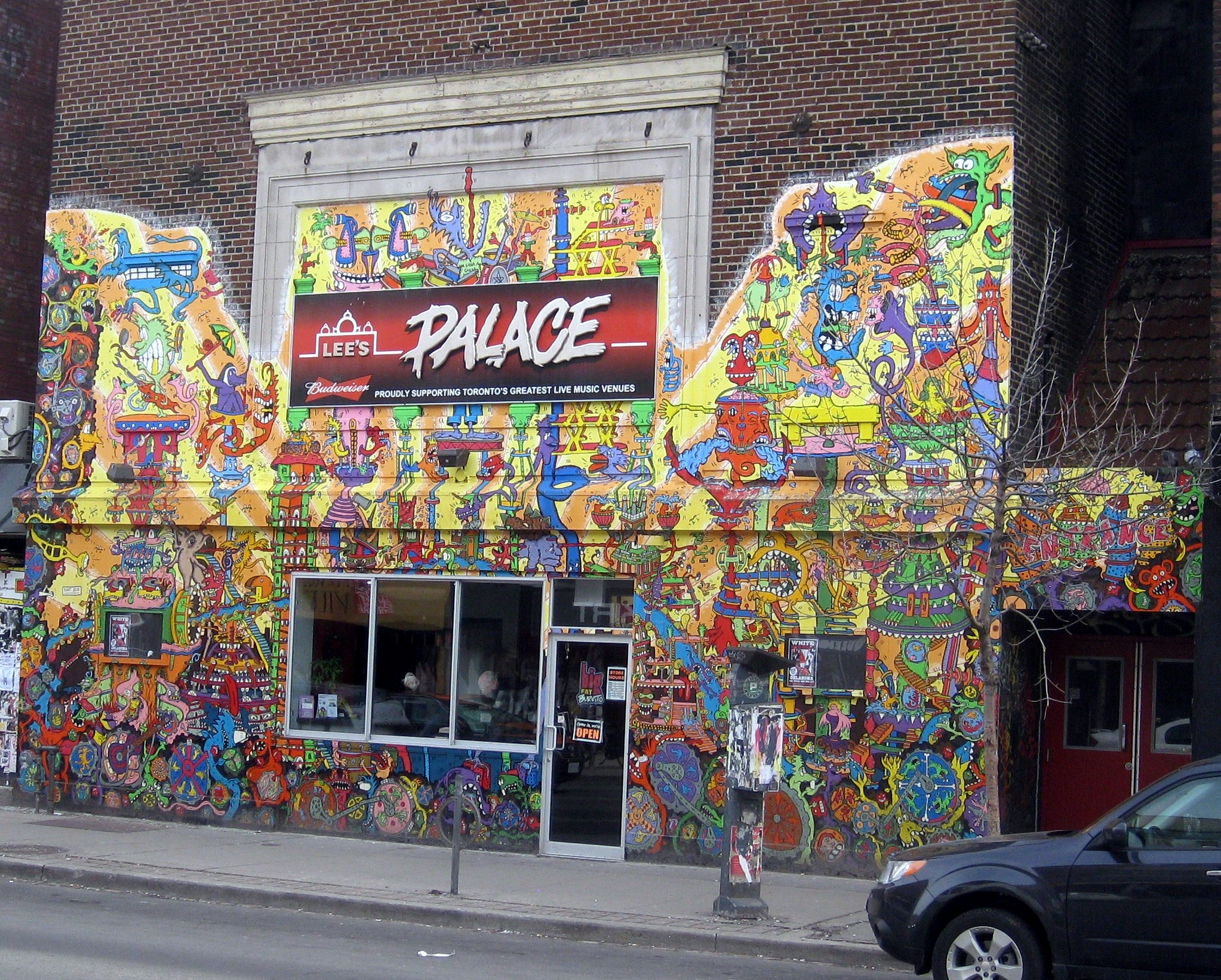
- Lee's Palace in March 2011 featuring a mural by Alex "Al Runt" Currie.
- Interactive map of Lee's Palace
- Former names: Allen's Bloor Theatre (1919–1923); Bloor Theatre (1923–1957); The Blue Orchid (1967–1976); Oriental Palace (1976–1985)
- Address: 529 Bloor Street West; Toronto ON M5S 1Y5
- Location: Toronto, Ontario, Canada
- Coordinates: 43.665272°N 79.409448°W
- Owner: Chong Su Lee (1986–2001); Chang Su Kang (2001–2006); Collective Concerts (Jeff Cohen) (2006–2023); Modo-Live (2023–present)
- Seating type: Standing room
- Capacity: 450-600
- Type: Nightclub, music venue
- Events: Alternative, Indie

Construction
- Built: early 1900s
- Opened: 5 September 1985

Website
- leespalace.com

Lee's Palace is a music venue located on the south side of Bloor Street West east of Lippincott Street in Toronto, Ontario, Canada.

The two-floor facility in The Annex neighbourhood has a long history prior to being adapted in September 1985 for its current use as a concert venue and nightclub. While the Lee's Palace live performance venue that accommodates just over 500 guest is on the ground floor, the top floor is occupied by The Dance Cave, a nightclub that on weekends mostly caters to university and college students from the nearby downtown Toronto schools such as University of Toronto, Toronto Metropolitan University, OCAD University, and George Brown College with alt-rock while attracting older patrons during the work week with a fare that includes goth rock, mod music, punk, and indie.

Having been established and owned for 16 years by the Korean Canadian entrepreneur Chong Su Lee a.k.a. Mr. Lee, the venue was purchased 2001 by Jeff Cohen with partners Ben Pearlman and Bruce Bennett that also has the Horseshoe Tavern, another iconic Toronto music venue, among its list of assets.

In December 2023, Lee's Palace was acquired by MODO LIVE, a Canadian based concert and live entertainment production company, as part of their venue portfolio which includes The Pearl on Granville in Vancouver, BC.

== History ==
The building at 529 Bloor Street West, which currently consists of two floors of 5,000 square feet each, dates back to early 1900s and was reportedly a bank at one point as well as a shoemaker shop.

=== Allen's Bloor Theatre ===
During late 1910s, the building's redesign was initiated by its new owners—Canadian-based Allen Theatres chain that decided to turn it into a silent film theater. With the redesign executed by the Detroit-based Howard Crane's company, the 782-seat Allen's Bloor Theatre became one of Toronto's (a city of some 200,000 inhabitants at the time) most luxurious suburban movie houses. The undertaking came as part of Allen Theatres' aggressive 1917-1920 expansion into the Toronto marketplace, a period during which they built/redesigned many buildings around the city into theaters such as Allen's Danforth on the Danforth and Allen's Beach Theatre in the Beaches neighbourhood. Allen Theatres additionally purchased many existing Toronto theaters like the nearby Madison Picture Palace across the road on Bloor Street West and the 1,100-seat Beaver Theatre in the Junction neighbourhood.

Allen's Bloor Theatre's premiere screening was held on 10 March 1919 with Cecil B. De Mille's Don't Change Your Husband starring Gloria Swanson.

In 1923, the Allen Theatres chain was sold to Famous Players, which by 1928 financed major renovations to the theatre including building an orchestra pit. The venue remained an active movie theatre until 1957.

=== The Blue Orchid ===
Following a period of almost ten years during which the property remained vacant, in 1967, the venue was purchased for Can$129,000 (equivalent to $1,119,663 in 2023) by local entrepreneur Ed Silverberg who then invested further Can$250,000 (equivalent to $2,169,890 in 2023) in order to convert it into a cabaret named the Blue Orchid. Inspired by the New York City drag shows, it functioned as a dinner theatre featuring burlesque shows and plays with all-male casts.

It was Silverberg who decided to turn the venue's upper balcony level into a tucked away, speakeasy-type bar with a dance floor. The Blue Orchid went away by 1976 and was replaced with Oriental Palace, a dinner and dance hospitality venue.

=== Lee's Palace ===
By mid 1980s, the building was purchased by Chong Su Lee a.k.a. Mr. Lee, owner of a nearby Stop & Go corner store on Bathurst and Harbord, who had become interested in the music venue concept through The Cameron House and the rest of the 1980s Queen West scene. On Thursday 5 September 1985, Lee's Palace was opened as a music club by Mr. Lee, the venue's namesake, with dancing on the top floor and live music on the main floor, much as it is today. The very first live show at the new venue on its opening night was Handsome Ned. The second live show—Blue Rodeo, who were booked on Handsome Ned's recommendation—took place two weeks later on 19 September 1985. The club was open seven days a week initially with Sundays becoming its signature night featuring local Toronto entertainer Frank Fazi's recurring Sunday Night Jam showcase with various local scene participants such as members of Greg Godovitz's Goddo.

The venue's early live concert booking policy—bringing fledgling local rock bands plus emerging international (mostly British and American) indie acts—established a formula that would be continued throughout the decades that followed. Initially, local Toronto-area and other Canadian acts were routinely recruited from the nearby Queen West scene: doing well at Queen West spots such as The Cameron House, Horseshoe Tavern, and The Rivoli would usually result in being booked at Lee's Palace. The venue's chief booker Craig Morrison—hired by and answering directly to the owner Mr. Lee—was reportedly extremely diligent about determining a local young band's popularity and viability by scouting their Toronto bar and club gigs ahead of booking them at Lee's, including subsequently keeping meticulous records on each booked act with information on the number of tickets sold and associated bar sales during the show. The Tragically Hip—five youngsters in their early-to-mid-20s from nearby Kingston gigging locally in bars throughout Ontario with no releases yet—played Lee's Palace in late October 1986, years before becoming a best-selling and celebrated musical act in Canada. Ahead of the show, their manager Jake Gold reportedly phoned Morrison in order to try to negotiate a Can$75 fixed payout (equivalent to $180 in 2023) on top of the door intake but got flatly rejected.

Later that year, on December 3, 1986, the venue hosted Red Hot Chili Peppers, a young band from Los Angeles. Supporting their second album and making their Toronto debut with a lineup featuring the band's founding member and original guitarist Hillel Slovak who would die of drug overdose eighteen months later, the show—opened by fellow Southern California punk rockers T.S.O.L. and Thelonious Monster and closed with the Peppers soon-to-become signature trademark 'socks-on-cocks' stage performance during an encore of Jimi Hendrix's "Fire"—marked the first instance of a future globally-known musical act playing Lee's Palace.

On 19 October 1994, the club was the venue for Oasis's very first Canadian show. Touring in support of their debut album that had been selling greatly in the United Kingdom, the band were exploding back home though still largely unknown in North America. The show itself, with Can$11.75 admission (equivalent to $22 in 2023), took place in front of a capacity crowd of some 600 people. In his negative review, the Toronto Star pop culture critic Peter Howell found the performance to be "devoid of personality" and delivered with "souless jukebox efficiency" akin to a "CD listening session": summarizing it by referring to Oasis as "fame chasing British press creations with glassy-eyed stares" that thought "simply showing up was enough to justify their Next Big Thing status". Over the years that followed, in addition to Oasis going on to global fame, their Lee's Palace gig would gain further notability once their singer Liam Gallagher started a high-profile relationship with actress Patsy Kensit and it was revealed that the two first met at Lee's Palace when Kensit, in town in Toronto shooting a U.S. television miniseries, came to the club show and afterwards socialized with the band on their tour bus.

== Artists who have played at Lee's Palace ==
The capacity of Lee's Palace is roughly 600 people in the concert area, and more upstairs in the "Dance Cave", the dance club under the same roof. The Dance Cave caters to the alternative rock crowd, playing retro rock, Mod, '60s, Britpop, and indie rock during the week, and straight alternative on the weekends.

Here is a selection of artists who have played at Lee's Palace:

International artists

- The Afghan Whigs
- Arctic Monkeys
- Belly
- Ben Harper
- Blind Melon
- Blur
- The Breeders July 23-24, 2002
- Buffalo Tom
- Buzzcocks
- Catherine Wheel
- Chapterhouse
- Counting Crows
- Dave Matthews Band
- Dinosaur Jr
- Echobelly
- Elastica
- Elliott Smith
- Ethel Cain
- The Flaming Lips
- Gin Blossoms
- The La's
- Live
- The Magnetic Fields
- Meat Puppets
- Ned's Atomic Dustbin
- Nirvana
- Oasis
- Primus
- Queens of the Stone Age January 28, 1999 & June 4, 2002
- Red Hot Chili Peppers
- Slowdive
- The Smashing Pumpkins
- Superchunk
- Swervedriver
- Teenage Fanclub
- Tortoise
- Urge Overkill
- The Verve
- Ween
- Yo La Tengo
- Dom Corleo

Canadian artists

- Alanis Morissette
- Arcade Fire
- Barenaked Ladies
- Blue Rodeo
- Bootsauce
- Bourbon Tabernacle Choir
- Broken Social Scene
- Cowboy Junkies
- Crash Vegas
- Danko Jones
- D.O.A.
- Doughboys
- Eric's Trip
- Hayden
- Headstones
- The Hidden Cameras
- Lowest of the Low
- Moist
- Pure
- Rusty
- Our Lady Peace
- Sloan
- Stars
- The Tea Party
- Teenage Head
- The Tragically Hip
- 8485

== Regulatory agencies ==
As the venue serves alcohol, attendance at concerts and events at Lee's Palace is generally restricted by the laws of the province of Ontario to those 19 years of age or older, although the venue occasionally hosts all-ages shows (usually on weekend afternoons or early evenings) where alcohol is not served.
