= Heavy Eyes (album) =

Studio album by Basement Revolver
- Released: 24 August 2018
- Studio: TAPE
- Genre: Dream pop; indie rock
- Length: 44:01
- Label: fear of missing out records; Sonic Unyon

Heavy Eyes is the debut studio album from Canadian indie rock band Basement Revolver. It was released in the UK by fear of missing out records and in Canada by Sonic Unyon. The album combines hardcore indie rock with dream pop influences, and has been described by vocalist and songwriter Chrisy Hurn as a "bit of a deep dive into myself".

== Track listing ==
All songs written by Chrisy Hurn.

1. Baby - 3:51
2. Johnny - 3:30
3. Dancing - 3:14
4. Friends - 3:19
5. Knocking - 4:56
6. Johnny, Pt. 2 - 3:55
7. Words - 3:16
8. Wait - 2:56
9. Tree Trunks - 3:40
10. You're Okay - 3:32
11. Heavy Eyes - 3:15
12. Diamonds - 4:37

== Personnel ==
- Chrisy Hurn - guitar/vocals
- Nimal Agalawatte - bass guitar
- Brandon Munro - drums
