= Basement Revolver =

Canadian indie rock band

- Origin: Hamilton, Ontario, Canada
- Genres: Indie; alternative; dream pop
- Years active: 2016–present
- Labels: fear of missing out; Yellow K Records; Sonic Unyon
- Members: Chrisy Hurn, Jonathan Malström, Nim Agalawatte, Will Fachin
- Past members: Brandon Munro
- Website: www.basementrevolver.com

Basement Revolver is an indie rock band from Hamilton, Ontario, Canada. Formed in 2016 by guitarist and vocalist Chrisy Hurn, bassist Nimal Agalawatte and former drummer Brandon Munro, the band has released two EPs and four singles, with their first album, Heavy Eyes, being released in 2019. While the band largely plays in Southern Ontario, they have toured the UK and have played in the Midwest USA and New York. Known for their alternative dream pop style of music, Basement Revolver has enjoyed success on both sides of the Atlantic, and signed onto British indie record label Fear of Missing Out Records in 2016.

== History ==
Hurn, a native of Newmarket, Ontario, and Agalawatte, originally from England, had known each other since childhood, and had been working on music in Hurn's basement apartment in Hamilton. When Munro, a college friend of Agalawatte and a Peterborough native, joined the duo, the band was formed under the name of Basement Revolver. The band's first gig was at Baltimore House in Hamilton, and their second show was playing at the 2016 Supercrawl. Soon afterwards, the band went to Tape Studio and recorded their first EP, Basement Revolver.

Soon afterwards, the band signed with UK-based indie record label Fear of Missing Out, and released their second EP Agatha as well as a single, Johnny Pt.2, a follow-up to the track "Johnny" off Basement Revolver, detailing Hurn's emotional state following a difficult relationship and breakup. Following this, the band signed to Hamilton label Sonic Unyon, a record label that also organises the Supercrawl. After touring extensively through Southern Ontario, the band's first concert in the USA was in Somerville, Massachusetts, in September 2017, followed by gigs in New York and Chicago. In May 2018, they played their first concert in the UK, at The Great Escape Festival in Brighton. They returned to the UK later that year to tour with Amber Arcades, following the release of two singles, Heavy Eyes and Baby.

On August 24, 2018, the band released their first full-length album, Heavy Eyes. The album included tracks previously released on EPs or as singles, such as "Johnny", "Baby" and "Tree Trunks", as well as several new songs, including "Dancing" and "Friends". The album was well-received by critics, with Billboard magazine labelling the album as being indicative of the band's transformation to becoming "heavier, both sonically and topically" with "emotional subject matter". On July 23, 2020, the band announced on Twitter than Munro was leaving Basement Revolver for reasons not made public. The next day, the band announced that Munro would be replaced by Levi Kertesz, who will appear on an upcoming album.

== Tours & concerts ==
=== 2017 ===
The group largely toured Southern Ontario throughout 2017, playing gigs in Hamilton, Montreal and Toronto. Their first tour of the US came in early September, with a five-day, three-show tour across Massachusetts, Illinois and New York

=== 2018 ===
Basement Revolver toured with The Go! Team in the Eastern USA in April 2018. In September 2018, the band joined The Pack A.D. on their cross-Canada tour. Basement Revolver, alongside Sorry Edith, opened for the Vancouver rock duo in their Ontarian shows, playing in Toronto, Ottawa, London and Windsor. In October of the same year, Basement Revolver toured the UK as a supporting act for Amber Arcades, playing around England and in Glasgow.

=== 2019 ===
The band played a two-day gig at the club Pianos in New York on March 7 and 8th. On April 2, the band played alongside Ellevator, another Hamiltonian band, in Montreal. The band has also played numerous gigs around Southern Ontario over the course of the year.

=== 2020 ===
The year began with several concerts in Southern Ontario, including a tour which began in Ottawa and ended in Thunder Bay. However, due to the COVID-19 pandemic and subsequent lockdown restrictions in Canada, the band was unable to perform live for the majority of the year.

== Discography ==
=== Albums ===
- Heavy Eyes (2018)
- Embody (2022)

=== EPs ===
- Basement Revolver (2016)
- Agatha (2017)
- Wax and Digital (2019)

=== Singles ===
- Johnny Pt.2 (2017)
- Bread & Wine (2017)
- Heavy Eyes (2018)
- Baby (2018)
