= Rosewood Thieves =

American folk rock band

The Rosewood Thieves are an American folk rock band from New York City.

== Band members ==
- Erick Jordan (voice, guitar)
- Paul Jenkins (guitar)
- Mackenzie Vernacchio (organ, Wurlitzer)
- Jon Estes (bass)
- Mark Bordenet (drums)

== From The Decker House ==
From The Decker House, their first major label contribution, is an EP which was released on July 25, 2006 on V2 Records.

"Basking in a remarkably classic, yet fresh, approach to roots rock that channels the Best Beatle and a love for Americana without venturing too deeply into rock’n’roll resurrection fantasies."

Additional contributors on the album include Samuel Markus who co-wrote "Back Home To Harlem", "Cold In the Country", "Diamond Ring", "You Make Me Blue", "Trouble", "California Moon", and "Doctor", jazz pianist Bob Dorough and Devendra Banhart collaborator Andy Cabic. It was produced and mixed by Thom Monahan.

The original release of the album consists of the tracks:

1. "Los Angeles"
2. "Back Home to Harlem"
3. "Cold in the Country"
4. "Diamond Ring"
5. "Doctor"
6. "Lonesome Road"

For a limited time, an expanded version was released with the following extra tracks:

1. "The Tale Of Gustav Grimes"
2. "You Make Me Blue"
3. "Trouble"

== Lonesome ==
Released November 20, 2007, the Lonesome EP is the band's self-released follow-up. It consists of tracks:

1. "Poor Bonnie's Affliction (Instrumental)"
2. "Untitled #1"
3. "California Moon"
4. "Murder Ballad In G Minor"
5. "Honey, Stay A While"
6. "A Bullet Painted Red"

Like its predecessor, Lonesome received some critical praise.

== Rise & Shine ==
Rise & Shine is the Rosewood Thieves' first full-length album, released in May 2008. The track listing is as follows:

1. "Silver Gun"
2. "She Don't Mind The Rain"
3. "When My Plane Lands"
4. "Flat Tire"
5. "Mad Man Blues"
6. "Fair Lights Flashing"
7. "Moon Song"
8. "Junkyard Julie"
9. "Gone"
10. "Heavy Eyes"
