= The Lemon Bucket Orkestra =

Canadian Guerilla-Folk-Punk band

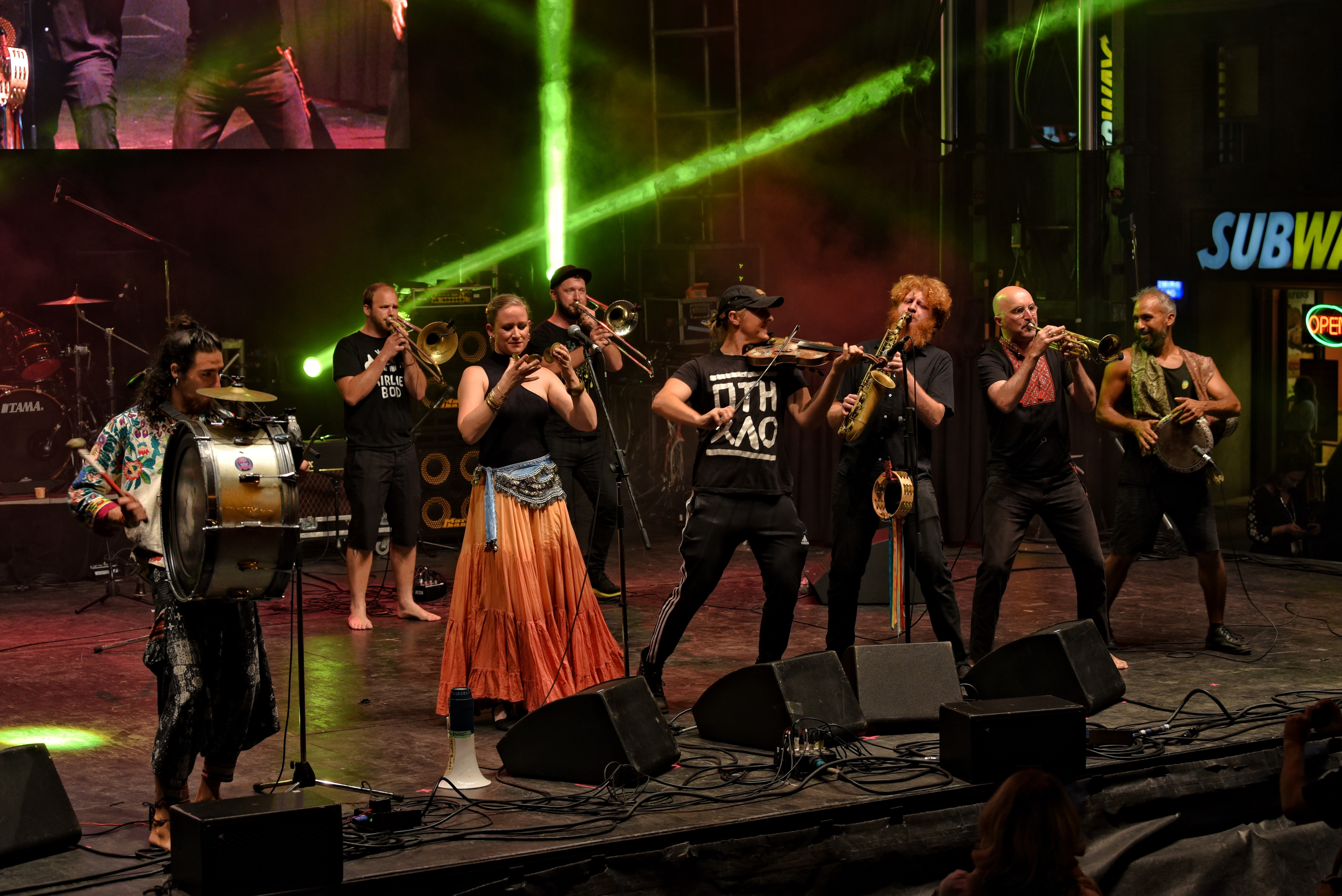
- Lemon Bucket Orkestra performing in 2017

Background information
- Also known as: Lemon Bucket
- Origin: Toronto, Ontario, Canada
- Genres: Punk; klezmer; jazz; Balkan brass
- Years active: 2010–present
- Members: Mark Marczyk; Oskar Lambarri; Alex Nahirny; Max Forster; Conrad Gluch; Stephania Woloshyn; Michael Louis Johnson; James McKie; Nathan Dell-Vandenberg; Ian Tulloch
- Past members: Karl Silveira; Jaash Singh; Julian Selody; Marichka; Jessica Deutsch; Rob Teehan; Anastasia Baczynskyj; Nick Buligan; Emily Ferrell; Tangi Ropars; Mike Romaniak; John David Williams; Emilyn Stam; Christopher Weatherstone; Eli Camilo; Naoki Hishinuma
- Website: lemonbucket.com

The Lemon Bucket Orkestra is a large Canadian band based in Toronto, known for their wide-ranging musical style incorporating punk, klezmer, jazz, Balkan brass and more. The ensemble has received many nominations and awards such as winning the 2015 Canadian Folk Music Awards "World Group of The Year", 2015 NOW Magazine Reader's Choice Award for "Best Band in Toronto" and a nomination for the 2016 JUNO Awards "World Music Album of the Year". Lemon Bucket has also toured the world playing festivals like Cervantino in Mexico, WOMAD in England and New Zealand, Pohoda in Slovakia, Festival D’Été in Québec City Canada, and the New Orleans Jazz Festival in the US.

== Early history ==
Founding member Mark Marczyk met bartender and musician Michael Louis Johnson in 2009 after returning to Toronto from Kyiv, Ukraine. Johnson introduced Marczyk to the Gypsy-punk band "Worldly Savages". Marczyk joined them on violin. It was here on the road through Eastern Europe that future founders of LBO (Mark Marczyk, Tangi Ropars, and Os kar Lambarri) became enamored with these cultures' deep folk traditions. When they returned home to Toronto, they lived together in a grimy punk house where they held late night after-party’s to local shows, and they jammed the folk songs they learned on the road, paving the way for the “Orkestra” they dreamed of.

Other members began to join the band over the next few years, usually after seeing the group live. Many of these meetings were by chance or accident. By 2013, the group had swelled to 17 members.

The group were also involved in a collective known as Fedora Upside Down, a collection of bands, artists and theatre acts in the genres of singer-songwriters, improvized party brass, forró, flamenco, Brazilian percussion, ragtime jazz and others founded by Marczyk, Tangi Ropars and Dre Flak of Freeman Dre and the Kitchen Party. Lia Grainger in 2012 described Fedora Upside Down as a "motley assortment of cultural ambassadors."

In 2011, the band recorded an EP Cheeky at the CBC. The song "Tomu Kosa" was released as promotional single. In November 2011, the group performed at a soundcheck event held by the Toronto Symphony Orchestra. Lemon Bucket was also broadcast Nationally and Internationally on CBC Radio in 2011 by Gilda Salomone.

=== Breakthrough ===
In 2012, The Lemon Bucket Orkestra made headlines (such as CNN, CBC, Fox News, and CTV), on their way to Romania for a three-week tour of the country, when they played an impromptu concert on a delayed Air Canada flight. While in Romania, the band opened for Taraf de Haïdouks. On their way back to Canada, the band once again performed aboard a delayed Air Canada flight in Germany, and then in Toronto Pearson International Airport upon arrival.

Toronto filmmaker Justin Friesen made a short documentary on the band titled Let's Make Lemonade. The film won Best Documentary and People's choice award in the Air Canada enRoute Film Festival. The film played in September 2012 at the Toronto Ukrainian Festival and was one of four Awards Finalists in the Air Canada enRoute Film Festival. The film played on Air Canada flights via the in-flight entertainment system from November 2012 to February 2013.

=== Lume, Lume (2012) ===
In late 2012, the band released their first full-length album: Lume, Lume (cf. Lume, lume, soro lume). Alan Cross described the sound of the album as "A traveling musical caravan burning wildly across the night sky". The following November, they began their Lume, Lume European tour, in support of the album. The tour took them to the countries of Romania, Serbia, Czech Republic, Slovakia, Hungary, Macedonia, and Germany.

Upon their return to North America, the group participated as musicians in a collaborative theatre piece entitled Midwinter Night: Sacred and Profane Rituals, at La MaMa Experimental Theatre Club in New York City.

In September 2012, the band played with Romanian brass ensemble Fanfare Ciocărlia. This was repeated when they brought Ciocărlia to a sold-out show at The Opera House in Toronto on July 5, 2013.

On July 8, 2013, the group embarked on a third tour of East Europe, visiting Germany, Serbia, Poland, Slovakia, Ukraine, Romania, and the Czech Republic. The tour was an ethnographic research tour, wherein the group accumulated new music and dances. Several of the songs the band learned on this tour ended up on the Moorka album, notably "Mirsa Reel" and "Dimineaca Pe Recoare", both of which were taught to the band by Nea Vasile and Taraful De La Mirsa in Mirsa, Romania.

In 2012 and 2013, the group sold out Toronto venue Lee's Palace three times: October 31, 2012, a Halloween themed show; March 16, 2013, celebrating the band's third birthday and St. Patrick's day; and again on May 25, 2013, when they brought Friends Gypsy Kumbia and Roma Carnivale from Montreal. In 2014 and 2015, this trend continued, with their shows at The Opera House and Lee's Palace becoming regular sellouts.

In September 2013, the band was nominated in four categories at the Canadian Folk Music Awards: New/Emerging Artist of the Year, World Group of the Year, Traditional Album of the Year, and Instrumental Group of the Year. In 2015, they were vindicated when they won World Group of the Year at the Canadian Folk Music Awards.

In February 2014, Lume, Lume was nominated in the category of Best World Music Album for the Juno Awards of 2014. In March 2014, the band was nominated for an Indie Award by Indie88 for "World Artist/Group or Duo of the Year". In mid-2014, the band embarked on its first cross-Canada tour, playing in various locations across Ontario, Nova Scotia, Quebec, Alberta and British Columbia.

=== Moorka (2014) ===
In September 2014, the band began recording their second full-length album, following their cross-Canada tour. The album was recorded in a barn in Waterloo, Ontario.

Between January and February 2015, members of the group took part in a critically acclaimed dinner theatre performance, Counting Sheep, about the ongoing Euromaidan written by bandleader Mark Marczyk and Marichka Kudriavtseva.

In February, the group announced the release of Moorka, and it was released March 24, 2015. In August 2015, the group remounted Counting Sheep before heading on a fourth international tour from mid to late 2015. In October, they teamed up with a Korean Folk Ensemble Dulsori in South Korea, spending three weeks performing, as well as creating and recording music. Upon their return, Lemon Bucket was awarded the title of Best Band in Toronto in Now Magazine's "Best of Toronto 2015" annual poll.

The album Moorka also won the title of World Group of the Year at the 2015 Canadian Folk Music Awards. Moorka was subsequently nominated for a Juno Award in the category of World Music Album of the Year.

=== Counting Sheep (2016) ===
In 2016, members of Lemon Bucket Orkestra along with other cast members of the play Counting Sheep recorded a full length record of the songs contained within the touring production.

The play created by Mark Marczyk and Marichka is a personal retelling of the Maidan revolution in Ukraine – an immersive Ukrainian guerrilla folk opera set to the energetic sounds of Toronto’s balkan-gypsy-klezmer-party-punk band, the Lemon Bucket Orkestra.

Based on the creators’ first-hand experiences during the 2014 Kyiv protests, Counting Sheep invites you to lose yourself in the events that changed the course of Ukraine’s history forever. Sing, march, protest, dance, eat, help, recoil, fight, laugh, cry – this is immersive theatre at its most gripping. Sung in traditional Ukrainian polyphony, Counting Sheep is a visceral exploration into the politics of revolution, beating with the heart of a people yearning for a better tomorrow.

=== If I Had the Strength (2018) ===
In 2018, the group released their fourth full-length studio album, If I Had the Strength.

The album was recorded at the famed Toronto studio, Canterbury Music and was a concept album centered around the themes present in the opening piece renamed The Game, a century old Slavic prison ballad. It tells a story of a young rebel coming home after putting everything on the line.

The work draws emotional weight from the band’s personal experiences with the Ukraine-Russia conflict, but it also highlights the dozen strong ensemble’s party-punk roots and attitude, developed and honed since their formative days busking on the streets of Toronto. “We start in a musty train car overlooking the fields and valleys of our youth through permanently smudged windows, reflecting on the life that once was and wondering how we can face our mothers, with the horrifying fact that we will never be the beloved boys or girls we once were,” Marczyk says, expanding on the album’s conceptual theme. “Then, with a sudden jolt we are transported to the memory of what led us to this moment and we’re sprinting for dear life in a struggle to keep ahead of our past selves. The whole album navigates between the shaky train car and a series of flashbacks – in the language of eastern European folklore – the main site of resistance and celebration for the Lemon Bucket Orkestra for the better part of the past decade.”

Documenting Lemon Bucket Orkestra, the album features a list of guest artists; including Canadian soprano, Measha Brueggergosman, Montreal-based Latino rapper, Boogat, a triumphant-yet-tragic 60 strong reading of the late Adrienne Cooper’s Sholem by Choir!Choir!Choir! Weaving in and out of the prison ballad theme, the work takes listeners on an emotional journey exploring trauma and tragedy through the lens of musical exploration and communal celebration.

=== Cuckoo (2024) ===
Cuckoo is Lemon Bucket Orkestra's fourth full length studio album, recorded in Toronto, Ontario at Revolution Studios and in Banff, AB at the Banff Centre for the Arts. The album was a return to their roots, a collection of party-forward heavy-hitting arrangements of folk songs. It is a collection of songs that span their entire history with Gadjo Dilo, one of the group's first songs, Frank's Freylekh, a song taught to the band by Frank London of The Klezmatics at KlezKanada in 2014, but also up to newest arrangements like Da Ishly Divky.

The recorded was tracked over five years from 2019 to 2024 captured on both ends of the continent featuring Macedonian brass master Nizo Alimov (former member of Kocani Orkestar) on the song Mik Mik.

The record was nominated for the 2024 Canadian Folk Music Awards "Global Roots Album of the Year" and was at the top of the global music charts for multiple months across Canada.

=== Live in Bogotá (2026) ===
This is Lemon Bucket's first official live release, Live in Bogotá, recorded in January 2026 at the Universidad de los Andes in Bogotá, Colombia.

This three song EP captures the immense energy they received from the crowd at the University that evening, featuring the first songthe band ever learned Tomu Kosa, an old Ukrainian love song from the Lemko region. This recording of Tomu Kosa also tracked the group performing with a charango, a double-stringed instrument native to the South America, commemorating their first tour to the these regions in the South. The other two songs included were Cuckoo, and Romano Oro, both bringing huge moshing and dancing energy from the crowd.

== Discography ==
- Cheeky – EP (2011)
- Lume, Lume – LP (2012)
- Moorka – LP (2015)
- Counting Sheep – LP (2016)
- If I Had the Strength – LP (2018)
- Cuckoo – LP (2024)
- Live in Bogotá - EP (2026)
