= Marlon Chaplin =

- Born: Toronto, Ontario, Canada
- Genres: Rock and Roll; Folk; Heavy rock; Punk-rock
- Occupations: Musician
- Instruments: Vocals; guitar; drums; piano; bass guitar
- Years active: 2007–present
- Website: Official Website

Marlon Chaplin is a Canadian singer-songwriter and multi-instrumentalist from Toronto, Ontario. He is known for playing with Broken Bricks, Freeman Dre and the Kitchen Party, Suitcase Sam, and Ada Dahli. He currently records and performs as his own self-titled project.

== Early life ==
Marlon was born in Toronto, Ontario. He attended Etobicoke School of the Arts where he formed his band, Broken Bricks with collaborator Luka Kuplowski who now has his own solo project.

== Broken Bricks ==
Broken Bricks released two albums Pasquale and Little Fugitives as well as a number of singles between 2009 and 2012. This culminated in a sold-out show at Lee's Palace at the release of Little Fugitives.

== Freeman Dre and the Kitchen Party ==
Chaplin was a regular member of Freeman Dre and the Kitchen Party for many years. He played guitar, piano, bass and drums in the band throughout the band's years and performed on all of their subsequent records. The Kitchen Party was begun by lead-man Andre Flak who created a musical collective known Fedora Upside Down most notably with The Lemon Bucket Orkestra.

== Solo career ==
=== Wanderer by Trade ===
Chaplin began a self-titled solo rock and roll project as early as 2014.

His first release Wanderer by Trade was released in 2016. Collaborations on the album featured contributing members of Zeus and Lemon Bucket Orkestra.

Four music videos were released for the album. "Carmeline" and "Skeleton Key" were directed by Justin Friesen and "In Stars" and "Conviction" were directed by Karly McCloskey.

In 2016, Chaplin released two singles: "Fossils" and "Annabelle + Someone". He released the single "Danger, Danger" in 2017.

=== The Circle ===
In 2018, Chaplin released his first solo full-length LP The Circle.

The first single was "Elevation" with a music video directed by James Featherstone and Michael Greggain.

The second single was "Take Me There" with a music video directed by Justine McCloskey.

The third single was "A Single Drop" with a music video directed by Justin Friesen.

Chaplin released a final single with the title track "The Circle" for the album with a video directed by Michael Greggain.

=== Singles release – spring/summer 2020 ===
Chaplin released two singles, "This Is How You Sleep" and "Are You Ok?" in late spring of 2020. A music video was released for "Are You Ok?" directed by Justin Friesen on 13 June 2020. The video was shot amongst the COVID-19 pandemic in Toronto.

=== Singles release – summer 2020 – summer 2021 ===
Starting 20 June 2020, Chaplin released a new single titled "Alternate End", followed by a continuous release of singles.

=== Synestalgia ===
On 31 August 2021, Chaplin released his full-length LP Synestalgia.

== Discography ==
=== Broken Bricks ===
- 2009: Pasquale, LP
- 2011: Little Fugitives, EP
- 2012: "Fortune Out Of You"/"It Won't Get You High", Single

=== Freeman Dre and the Kitchen Party ===
- 2010: Red Door, Second Floor, LP
- 2012: Old Town, LP
- 2015: Vodka/Pickle, EP
- 2017: Reckless Good Intentions, LP

=== Ada Dahli & the Pallbearers ===
- 2015: Tangents, LP

=== Suitcase Sam ===
- 2019: Goodnight Riverdale Park, LP

=== Marlon Chaplin ===
- 2016: Wanderer by Trade, EP
- 2016: "Fossils"/"Annabelle + Someone", Single
- 2017: "Danger, Danger", Single
- 2018: The Circle, LP
- 2020: "This is How You Sleep", Single
- 2020: "Are You Ok?", Single
- 2021: Synestalgia, LP
