= Kansas Stone =

Canadian country band

- Origin: Barrie, Ontario, Canada
- Genres: Country, Country rock
- Years active: 2013–present
- Labels: independent
- Members: Brian (Vain) Harwood; Matt Davey; Jamie Taylor; Aj Astle; Jeff (DownTown) Brown
- Website: www.kansasstone.ca

Kansas Stone is a Canadian country band from Barrie, Ontario, consisting of core members and longtime friends Brian Harwood (front man) and Matt Davey, both of whom sing and play guitar. Kansas Stone is a high energy country band that fuels off of many different styles. Hailing from Ontario, Canada, they deliver a sound that ranges from old and new country, blues, rock, and more. Kansas Stone has become known for their catchy melodies and well crafted original songs.

== History ==
Growing up, Brian Harwood and Matt Davey were heavily influenced by country artists Garth Brooks, Randy Travis, Johnny Cash, Waylon Jennings, and classic rock artists Bon Jovi, Aerosmith, and Guns N' Roses, among others. The pair started Kansas Stone as a side project in 2013.

The band name does not refer directly to the American state, according to Vain, who is credited with having come up with the name. Rather, it refers to the supposed original meaning of the Kansa tribe's name in their native language, which has been roughly translated as "people of the south wind," or as Vain interprets it, "warm, southern wind." The way the band describes their name, it "epitomizes a warm summer good feeling." As for the "stone" portion of the name, the band has also stated that "we're like a family; we're like a stone, solid as a rock."

Both Harwood and Davey contribute to the band's songwriting effort. During an interview at the 2018 Country Music Association of Ontario Awards, Harwood and Davey stated that they co-wrote Blaze of Nothing with input from friend Patricia Conroy while they were visiting Nashville, Tennessee.

== Music ==
Kansas Stone has released several singles, and one EP, Country 101, which was released in 2016. The songs "All I Want" and "Whiskey & Wine" were both originally released as singles before later being released as part of their Country 101 EP.

=== Singles ===
- "Edge of Forever"
- "Cash'n out"
- "Up"
- "Next Stop Nashville"
- "Country Queen"
- "Hand in Mine"
- "Blaze of Nothing"

=== Country 101 EP ===
- "Country 101"
- "Whiskey & Wine"
- "All I Want"
- "Drink On"

== Live and broadcast performances ==
Kansas Stone has been featured on television and on the radio. On 20 April 2016, the group appeared on the Citytv network's morning television show Breakfast Television Montreal to perform their song "Country Queen" live. On 3 May 2016, the band was featured on Rogers TV performing their song "Country 101" ahead of their debut EP release of the same name. In 2018, Kansas Stone performed original songs "Up" and "Blaze of Nothing", as well as a cover of The Cadillac Three's "White Lightning" live on SiriusXM Canada.

In February 2016, Kansas Stone unveiled the official music video for the song "Whiskey & Wine" at The Ranch, a country bar in their hometown of Barrie. The event was hosted by CMT's Paul McGuire. During Canadian Music Week 2016, Kansas Stone performed at the Phoenix Concert Theatre in Toronto as part of their Boots & Hearts Hot Shots Showcase. In 2017, the band performed at Mavricks Music Hall in their home town of Barrie along with Blackjack Billy and Madeline.

=== Festival appearances ===
Kansas Stone has performed at a number of high-profile, regional music festivals.

Havelock Country Jamboree – On 18 August 2016, the band performed at the Havelock Country Jamboree music festival, where headlining artists The Band Perry, Terri Clark, Scotty McCreery, and others also performed. The band performed at the festival again in 2019 along with a number of other artists including Billy Currington, Gord Bamford, and Brett Kissel, whom Kansas Stone has collaborated with.

Indie Week Canada – In both 2016 and 2017, the band performed at the annual Indie Week Canada music festival in Toronto.

Country Wild – The band performed at Cobourg, Ontario's "Country Wild" music festival, both in 2017 and in 2019.

Trackside Music Festival – In 2018, the band performed at the Trackside Music Festival in London, Ontario, where Dierks Bentley, Dean Brody, and Emerson Drive also performed.

Kempenfest – In August 2019, the band performed at Kempenfest, where Loverboy, Jess Moskaluke, Teenage Head (band), and other artists also performed.

== Recognition ==
In 2015, Kansas Stone was chosen as one of six finalists for "The Next Country Music Star Talent Search," an annual event organized in part by the Havelock Country Jamboree.

Kansas Stone's single, "Blaze of Nothing", was nominated for the "Music Video of the Year" award at the 2019 Country Music Association of Ontario (CMAO) Awards.
