= The Heavy Eyes =

American band

- Origin: Memphis, Tennessee, U.S.
- Genres: Blues rock; hard rock; psychedelic rock; heavy metal; alternative rock
- Years active: 2010–present
- Labels: Kozmik Artifactz; Soul Patch
- Members: Tripp Shumake; Wally Anderson; Eric Garcia; Matt Qualls
- Website: theheavyeyes.com

The Heavy Eyes are a Memphis-born psychedelic blues rock band that merges heavy blues, stoner rock, and modern influences into a psychedelic soundscape.

== Background ==
The Heavy Eyes was founded by Tripp Shumake, Wally Anderson, and Eric Garcia. The band have released four studio albums, two with German label Kozmik Artifactz. In addition to their albums, they have a diverse catalog of EPs, splits, digital singles, and a live album. The Heavy Eyes signed a deal with the German label Kozmik Artifactz, who released their debut album on vinyl. The band quickly shifted focus to their follow-up, Maera, which released on December 29, 2012, and subsequently on vinyl in March 2013. Their third album, He Dreams of Lions, arrived on November 27, 2015, via Kozmik Artifactz.

In 2018, the band released a live track titled "Home" and a full live album, Live in Memphis.

Love Like Machines was released on March 27, 2020, via Kozmik Artifactz.

The band announced in March 2026 that it would release a new album, Focus on June 12, 2026. The first single, Troublesome Priest, was released on March 24,2026. The band will embark on a European tour in June 2026 to promote their new release.

== Discography ==
=== Studio albums ===
- 2011: The Heavy Eyes
- 2013: Maera
- 2015: He Dreams of Lions
- 2020: Love Like Machines
- 2026: Focus

=== EPs ===
- 2010: 1
- 2012: 2

=== Live albums ===
- 2018: Live in Memphis

== Band members ==
- Tripp Shumake – Guitar, Vocals
- Wally Anderson – Bass
- Eric Garcia – Drums
- Matt Qualls – Guitar, Vocals
