= Suitcase Sam =

Canadian musician

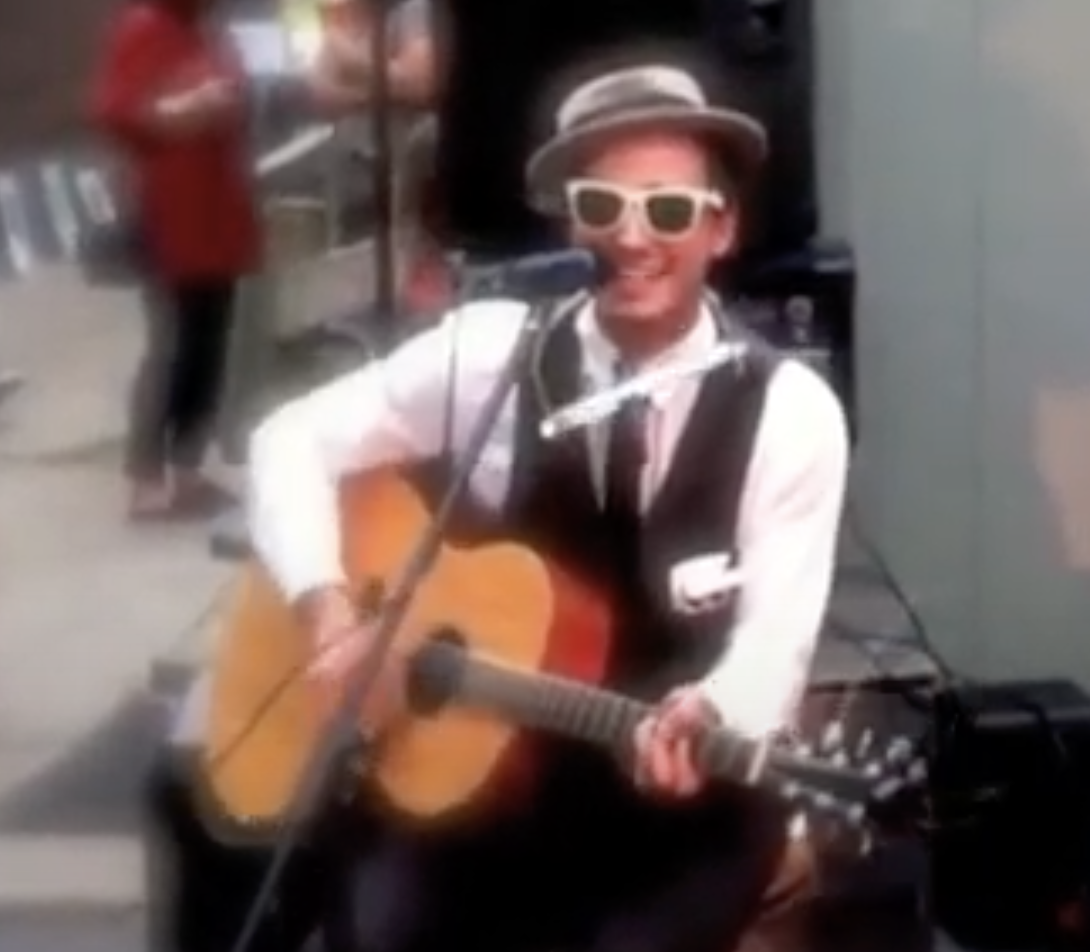
- Suitcase Sam performing in 2012

Background information
- Born: Toronto, Ontario
- Genres: Rock and Roll; Country-rock; Jazz; Ragtime; Blues Music
- Occupation: Musician
- Instruments: Vocals; guitar
- Years active: 2010–present
- Website: Official Website

Suitcase Sam is a Canadian singer-songwriter from Toronto, Ontario. He is known for his self titled project, playing with a full band sometimes described as Suitcase Sam and the Suits or Suitcase Sam and his Orchestra.

== Career ==
Suitcase Sam, inspired by the 1920's Jazz Age and acts like Leon Redbone, released his first EP Get It To Go in 2010. He was originally signed with Pleasance Records. The album was later adapted into a short film for BravoFACT under the same name. After joining Curve Music, Get It To Go was reissued in 2019. He has opened for acts like Courtney Barnett, Elliott Brood and Benjamin Booker.

In 2019 on the Curve label, Suitcase Sam released Goodnight Riverdale Park to favourable reviews. Album collaborations included Marlon Chaplin and members of The Lemon Bucket Orkestra. In October, 2020, a music video for "Frankie and Me" from the album was released, directed by Justin Friesen. In June 2021, a new video for "Edge of Town" was released directed by Justine and Karly McCloskey.

== Discography ==
- 2010: Get It To Go, EP
- 2014: Waiting On A Train, EP
- 2019: Goodnight Riverdale Park, LP
