= Havelock Country Jamboree =

- Genre: Country music
- Dates: August 15–18, 2019
- Locations: Havelock, Ontario, Canada
- Years active: 1990–2019
- Website: http://

The Havelock Country Jamboree was a four-day country music camping festival held in the village of Havelock, Ontario (located 170 km (110 miles) northeast of Toronto). Called Canada's Largest Country Music and Camping Festival, the festival has a Thursday through Sunday schedule on the third weekend in August every year. For the 2019 version of the event, the Jamboree built twin stages, with each stage measuring 60 ft (18 m) wide by 40 ft (12 m) deep. The festival had been on-hold due to COVID-19 restrictions in 2020 and 2021. It was announced on the Jamboree website in June 2023 that the Havelock Jamboree was closing permanently.

== History ==
The Havelock Country Jamboree began in 1990 as a three-day event held on a few acres of farm fields with a semi-truck trailer as the stage. It had since grown to a four-day event with over 500 acres (2.0 km^{2}) of camping area and twin stages. New Twin Stages were built in 2013 as the event continued to grow and draw fans from all over North America.

Havelock Country Jamboree featured over 25 entertainers performing on twin stages over a 4-day period.

The Havelock Jamboree sought to create a friendly, community atmosphere where music fans could enjoy their favourite performers. The Havelock Country Jamboree featured a mix of veteran and young up-and-coming artists from both Canada and the United States. Many of the later musicians had previously appeared in Havelock at past Jamborees. Others, however, were making their first appearance at the venerable music festival. The twin stages had held over 4000 musicians as the popular festival had grown over the years. The Jamboree had worked hard to create a festive and supportive atmosphere for everyone.

== 2019 Lineup ==
Brett Kissel, James Barker Band, The Washboard Union, The Good Brothers, Dead Flowers, Kansas Stone, Doc Yates.

== Past performers ==
=== A ===
- Trace Adkins

=== B ===
- The Band Perry
- Dierks Bentley
- Clint Black
- Lee Brice
- Dean Brody
- Kix Brooks
- Tracy Byrd

=== C ===
- Glen Campbell
- George Canyon
- Carlene Carter
- Terri Clark
- Stompin' Tom Connors
- Creedence Clearwater Revisited
- Billy Ray Cyrus

=== D-I ===
- Joe Diffie
- Jessie Farrell
- Mickey Gilley
- The Good Brothers
- Tim Hicks

=== J ===
- Alan Jackson
- Carolyn Dawn Johnson
- Wynonna Judd

=== K ===
- Toby Keith
- Kris Kristofferson
- Madison Kozak

=== L ===
- Dawn Langstroth
- Tracy Lawrence
- Lonestar
- Patty Loveless
- Corb Lund
- Loretta Lynn

=== M ===
- Neal McCoy
- Scotty McCreery
- Country Joe McDonald
- Reba McEntire
- Jo Dee Messina
- Justin Moore
- Montana Sky

=== N-Q ===
- The Neilsons
- Juice Newton
- Nitty Gritty Dirt Band

=== R ===
- LeAnn Rimes
- Kenny Rogers
- Mitch Ryder

=== S ===
- The Sadies
- Earl Scruggs
- Crystal Shawanda
- Ricky Skaggs
- Connie Smith
- South Mountain
- The Stampeders
- Marty Stuart

=== T-V ===
- Aaron Tippin
- Travis Tritt
- Tanya Tucker
- Ricky Van Shelton

=== W ===
- Doc Walker
- Hank Williams III
- Lee Ann Womack

=== X-Z ===
- Shane Yellowbird
- Dwight Yoakam

== See also ==
- List of country music festivals
- Music in Canada
