= MegaCity Chorus =

Chorus in Toronto, Ontario

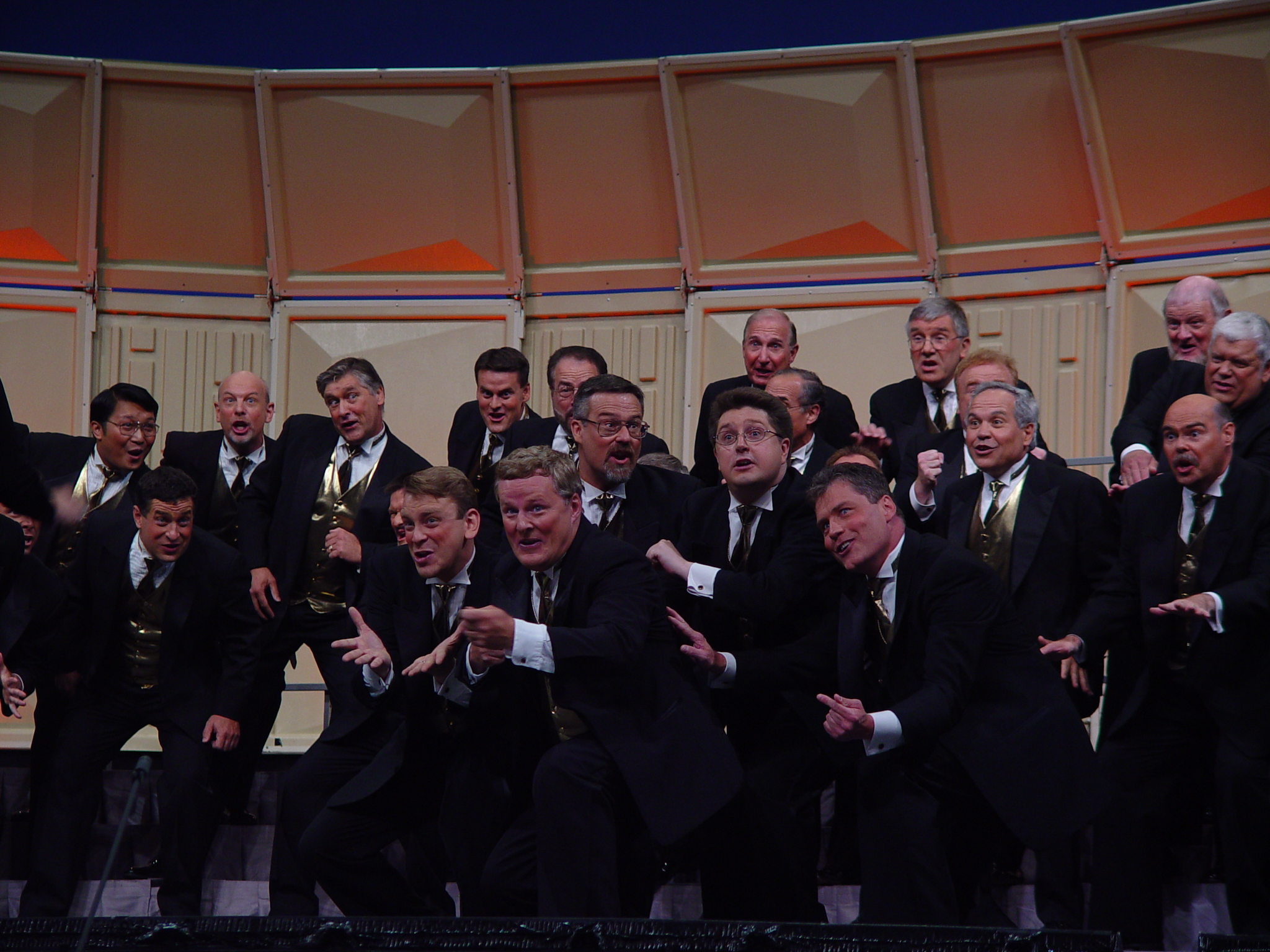
The MegaCity Chorus

The MegaCity Chorus is a Toronto, Ontario-based men's chorus of about 60 singers drawn from the Ontario District of the Barbershop Harmony Society.

== History ==
Founded in 1997, the chorus has won the Ontario District Championship in 1999 and 2005 under their founding Director June Dale. They have competed at International Contest in 2003, 2005. The Chorus won the Ontario District Championship on October 17, 2011, and will be representing the Ontario District in the International Contest in Portland, Ore, in 2012.

Following International convention in July 2005 June Dale retired in order to concentrate on competitions with North Metro Chorus. After June Dale's retirement, the musical direction of the chorus was taken over by Chris Arnold, former associate director of Toronto Northern Lights. The Megacity Chorus has been under the musical direction of Dan Rutzen since January 2011.
