= Handsome Ned =

- Born: Robin David Masyk; June 4, 1957; Zweibrücken, West Germany
- Died: January 10, 1987 (aged 29) Toronto, Ontario
- Genres: alternative country, rockabilly
- Occupations: Singer, songwriter
- Instrument: Vocals
- Years active: 1980s

Robin David Masyk (June 4, 1957 – January 10, 1987), known as Handsome Ned, was a Canadian country singer and songwriter. Although he only released a small number of singles and was never widely known outside of Toronto during his lifetime, he has been credited as the catalyst for an early-1980s country music and roots rock revival in Toronto which paved the way for acts such as Blue Rodeo, Prairie Oyster, Skydiggers and Cowboy Junkies to break through to greater fame, and as one of the key figures in the transformation of the city's Queen Street West district into a cultural hotspot.

As well, he received a posthumous Juno Award nomination for Best Male Country Vocalist at the Juno Awards of 1990, after some of his archival recordings were released in 1989, as the album The Ballad of Handsome Ned.

== Background ==
Masyk was born in 1957 in Zweibrücken, West Germany, to parents in the Canadian military. He returned with his family to Stoney Creek, Ontario in 1970. He was a fan in this era of proto-punk music such as Iggy and the Stooges and The Velvet Underground. After discovering a taste for classic country music of the 1950s, he moved to Austin, Texas for a year to learn more about the genre and then moved back to Toronto in 1979.

== Career ==
Initially, Masyk and his brother Jim started a band called The Velours, whose material consisted primarily of Elvis Presley and Velvet Underground covers with some original songs. In 1981, the band was joined by Ronny Azzopardi of The Next and J. D. Weatherstone of The Demics, and changed its name to The Sidewinders. They performed several shows as an opening act for The Viletones, increasing their popularity and soon becoming a headlining draw in their own right. He hosted a weekly residency at the Cameron House tavern on Queen Street West, playing there as a headliner and providing a platform for other like-minded artists.

Over the course of his career, he performed under several different band names including The Sidewinders, The Hayseed Hellions, The Running Kind, The Handsome Neds and The New Neds. He released a small number of independent singles both as a solo artist and with the Sidewinders, and was a regular organizer of country-themed music events such as the "Handsome Ned Picnic" and "Honky Tonk Heart". The Handsome Ned Picnic, an annual event for at least three years, included acts such as The Razorbacks and Shadowy Men on a Shadowy Planet as performers, while Honky Tonk Heart, a one-off show at The Horseshoe Tavern in 1985, included the second-ever live performance by Blue Rodeo.

Handsome Ned was the host of a weekly eclectic music show on CKLN-FM called The Honky-Tonk Hardwood Floor Show. The show focussed on outlaw country and cow-punk as well as almost any other genre. The show featured impromptu conversation with, and performances by, local and international artists. Ned's wide-ranging taste introduced an eager audience to alternatives to mainstream rock and country. He was a champion for and had a major influence on independent music during his time in Toronto.

He appeared in an advertising campaign for Molson Export in 1986.

== Death and legacy ==
Masyk died of a heroin overdose on January 10, 1987. Murray McLauchlan, who had been preparing to produce Masyk's debut album, intended to host a special tribute episode of the Honky Tonk Hardwood Floor Show a few days after his death. The tribute was hosted by Erella Vent, Jack the Bear and Dave Richards because McLauchlan was unable to attend. Following his funeral, hundreds of fans lined Queen Street for a funeral procession.

"Put the Blame on Me", his best-known song, was featured on the soundtrack to Bruce McDonald's film Roadkill in 1989. In the same year, Jim Masyk compiled and remastered archival recordings of Ned's songs for the album The Ballad of Handsome Ned, resulting in Ned's posthumous Juno nomination. Jim Masyk later compiled another two-CD set of additional archival recordings, which was released in 2000, as The Name Is Ned.

Filmmakers Chris Terry and Ross Edmunds released the documentary film You Left Me Blue: The Handsome Ned Story in 2010. The film premiered at NXNE in 2010, but saw no further distribution at that time.

He was the subject of a chapter in Ray Robertson's 2025 non-fiction book Dust: More Lives of the Poets. In the same year, Dale Heslip's documentary film Blue Rodeo: Lost Together briefly touched on Ned's role in the band's early days. These both led to a resurgence of interest in his story, resulting in You Left Me Blue receiving limited commercial release in January 2026.
