= Karen James (folk singer) =

Canadian actress and folk singer (born 1939)

- Born: September 23, 1939 (age 87); Surrey, England, UK
- Occupations: actress, singer

Karen James (born September 23, 1939) is a Canadian former actor and folk music-songwriter who performs songs in Spanish, English, and French.

== Life and career ==
Karen James, the daughter of Spanish-born folk musician Isabelita Alonso and Norwegian-born pianist Hans Scheel, arrived in Canada at the age of 12 in 1952 and began working for CBC radio in Toronto. Soon she had her own summer radio program entitled "Karen Discovers America" (1952). She started her career under the stage name Karen Beissel, changing it to Karen McElheron in 1957 and two years later to Karen James. In 1962, she moved to Vancouver, and in 1966, changed her name to Karen Currie.

James has been singing professionally since 1959 and was one of the top folk-singing soloists in Canada in the first half of 1960s.

== Personal life ==
James married Vancouver artist James McElheron in 1957; the couple divorced in 1959. In 1966, she married Vancouver television producer James Andrew Currie.

== Discography ==
- Karen James Accompanying Herself On Guitar (1961)
- Through Streets Broad And Narrow (1962)
- Children's Songs From Spain (1963) (in collaboration with her mother Isabelita Alonso)

== Acting credits ==
=== Television plays ===
Year	Title	Role	Notes
1954	Playbill		"The Hideaway"
1960	Startime	Petra Stockmann	"An Enemy of the People"
1960	First Person		"Harry"
1960–1961	General Motors Theatre	Various	2 episodes
1961	Q for Quest		"Burlap Bags"
1963–1964	The Serial	Tally Prendergast	"Wings of the Night"

=== Television talk, news, music and variety shows ===
Year	Title	Role	Notes
1959	Tabloid (talk show)	Self-Singer	12 December 1959 (Songs are performed by Guy Caroline and Karen to conclude the program)
1960	Tommy Ambrose Show (musical variety show)	Self-Singer	22 September 1961
1962	Open House	Self-Singer	29 June 1962 (Traditional songs are performed by Karen: 'Cathie Ryan'; 'B For Barney'; 'Hush Little Baby' and 'Fiona Blackburn (Next Market Day)'
1962	On Scene	Self-Singer	20 July 1962 (Karen performs for the crowd at a square dance festival in High Park)
1963	Take 30	Self-Singer	1 January 1963
1964	Showcase	Self-Singer	18 January 1964
1964	Let's Sing Out	Self-Singer	1 December 1964 (Songs are performed by Karen: 'Samson' and 'The Unicorn')

=== Stage ===
Year	Title	Role	Notes
1958	The Love of Four Colonels	Beauty	10 – 15 November at Ottawa Little Theatre
