= Freeman Dre and the Kitchen Party =

Folk rock band from Toronto, Canada

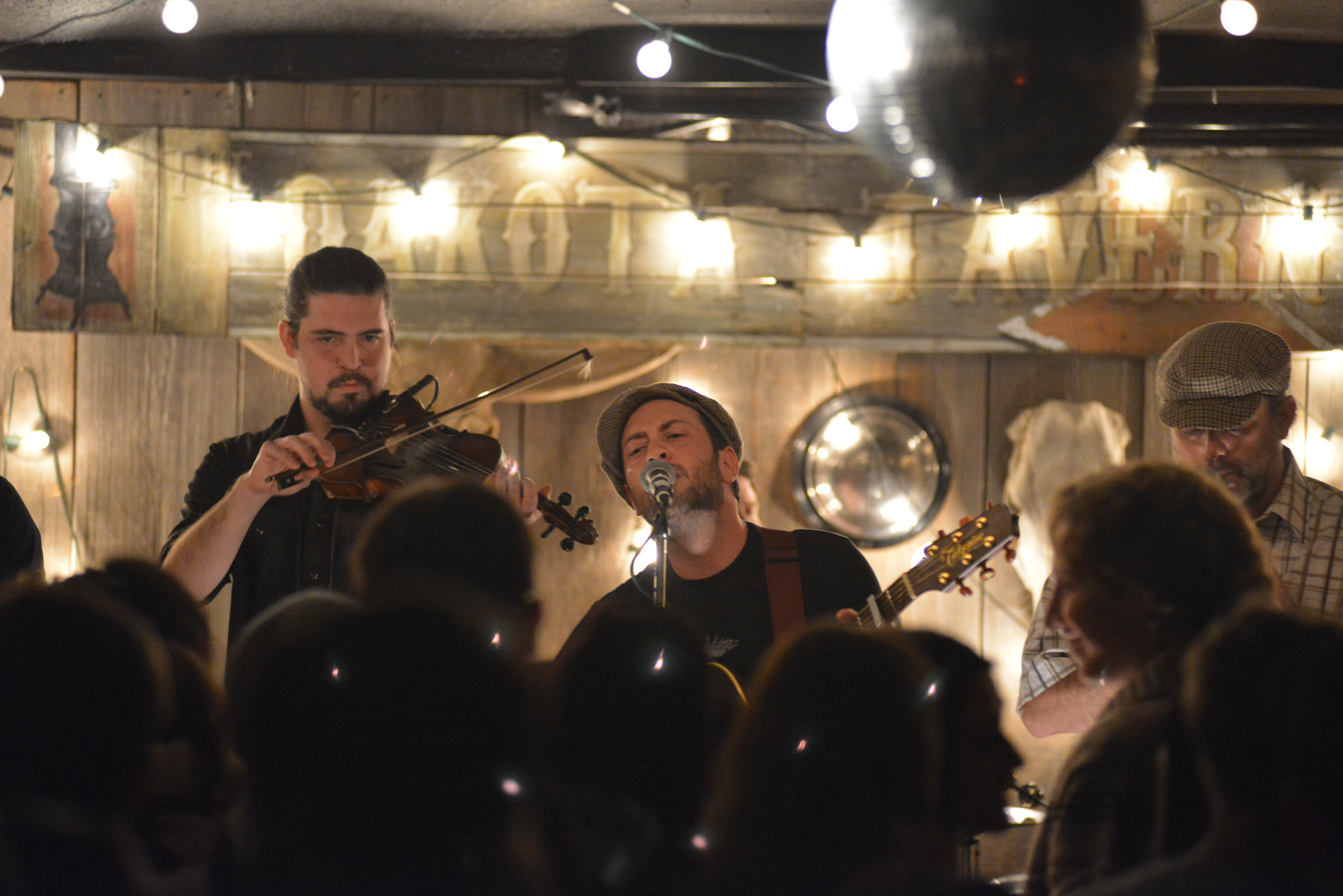
- Freeman Dre and the Kitchen Party performing at The Dakota Tavern in Toronto, 2012

Background information
- Origin: Toronto, Ontario, Canada
- Genres: Rock and roll, folk rock, blues, Eastern European music, country, blues rock
- Years active: 2010-Present
- Members: Andre Flak; Lonny Knapp; James McKie; Joe Ernewein; Michael O'Grady; Neil MacIntosh; Terry Wilkins
- Past members: Charlie Crenshaw; Marlon Chaplin
- Website: Official website

Freeman Dre and the Kitchen Party is a folk rock band from Toronto, Canada.

== Background ==
Freeman Dre and the Kitchen Party is helmed by bandleader and singer-songwriter Andre (Dre) Flak. The origins of the band come from house parties where Dre and Lonny would play music in Dre's kitchen. The name "Kitchen Party" came from these parties, in the spirit of an east coast kitchen party or traditional Céilidh. The Kitchen Party is also a member of Fedora Upside Down, a musical collective begun by Dre and Mark Marczyk of The Lemon Bucket Orkestra. Fedora Upside Down has been described as a "motley assortment of cultural ambassadors" who spend "the summer taking over the city’s streets, parks, restaurants and bars with lively music and raucous dance parties."

In early 2023, Dre suffered a severe brain injury and now draws inspiration from his recovery when writing music.

== Red Door, Second Floor ==
In 2010, the band released their debut album Red Door, Second Floor. The name of the album referred to Dre's Parkdale apartment. The album was produced by John Critchley and was met with favorable reviews. The album had rotation in Canada and in Britain on BBC Radio.

Freeman Dre won "Best Songwriter" in the 2010 Now magazine "Best of Toronto Reader's Poll".

== Old Town ==
In 2012, the band released their second album Old Town. The themes of the album reflect Dre's Polish and Irish ancestry, and the immigrant experience in Toronto. The album was produced by Dale Morningstar at The Gas Station studio on Toronto Island and was met with favourable reviews. The album was released at a party hosted at The Horseshoe Tavern in Toronto.

In 2012, Freeman Dre was nominated a second time for "Best Songwriter" by Now magazine.

During the 2013 Stanley Cup playoffs, the band produced a song dedicated to the Toronto Maple Leafs entitled Go Leafs, Go!. In 2013, the track "Whatever It Takes" off Old Town was used in a Season 3 episode of the Showcase series Lost Girl.

== Vodka/Pickle EP ==
On November 23, 2013, they released their first single from their new album titled "Wickedness", which was met with positive reviews. The single also features a B-side titled "Apophenia". The single "Wickedness" was accompanied by a music video directed by Justin Friesen.

On May 16, 2015, the band released the six song Vodka/Pickle EP.

== Reckless Good Intentions ==
The band began working on a third LP titled Reckless Good Intentions originally scheduled to be released June, 2016. Reckless Good Intentions was released June 9, 2017.

== Discography ==
=== Albums ===
- 2010: Red Door, Second Floor, LP
- 2012: Old Town, LP
- 2015: Vodka/Pickle, EP
- 2017: Reckless Good Intentions, LP

=== Singles ===
- 2013: "Wickedness"
- 2014: "Of All The People"
- 2014: "Never Went To Church Much"
