= Elias Lindholm =

Swedish ice hockey player (born 1994)

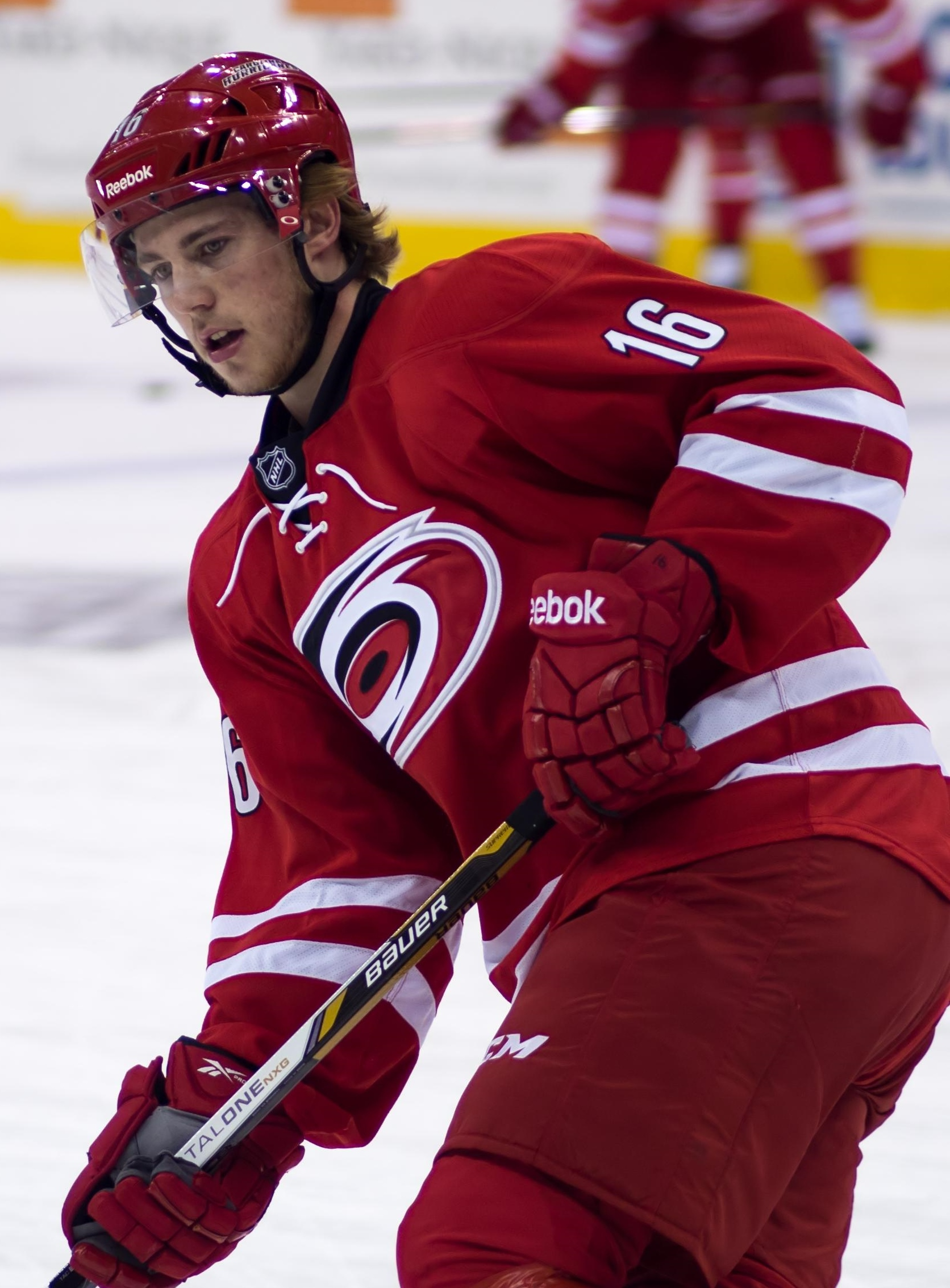
- Lindholm with the Carolina Hurricanes in 2013
- Born: 2 December 1994 (age 31) Boden, Sweden
- Height: 6 ft 1 in (185 cm)
- Weight: 200 lb (91 kg; 14 st 4 lb)
- Position: Centre
- Shoots: Right
- NHL team Former teams: Boston Bruins; Brynäs IF; Carolina Hurricanes; Calgary Flames; Vancouver Canucks
- National team: Sweden
- NHL draft: 5th overall, 2013; Carolina Hurricanes
- Playing career: 2011–present

Elias Viktor Zebulon Lindholm (born 2 December 1994) is a Swedish professional ice hockey player who is a forward for the Boston Bruins of the National Hockey League (NHL). He was selected by the Carolina Hurricanes in the first round (fifth overall) of the 2013 NHL entry draft, and spent his first five NHL seasons with them.

== Playing career ==
=== Sweden ===
Lindholm played with Brynäs IF's under-20 team, he played four games for the under-20 team and was the second-leading scorer for the under-18 team. Lindholm was selected in the fourth round (86th overall) by SKA St. Petersburg in the 2011 KHL Junior Draft.

In the 2011–12 season, Lindholm joined Sweden's Elitserien, and played in 14 games, including two playoff games for Brynäs IF. Once again a key offensive force for Brynäs IF's under-20 team and also the 2011 World Junior A Challenge and 2012 World U18 Championships tournaments.

Still with Brynäs, Lindholm led all junior players in the Elitserien with 30 points, recording 11 goals and 19 assists. He skated for Sweden's U20 World Junior Championship in Ufa; scoring 2 goals with 2 assists and was minus-one with 4 penalty minutes in six games, where they won the silver medal.

=== Carolina Hurricanes (2013–2018) ===
Following being drafted by the Carolina Hurricanes, Lindholm made the opening roster for the 2013–14 NHL season. He scored his first NHL goal in his fourth NHL game on 10 October 2013. By scoring his first NHL goal at 18 years and 311 days, Lindholm became the youngest Swedish-born NHL player to score a goal, beating Gabriel Landeskog's previous record of 18 years and 324 days.

On 8 March 2015, Lindholm scored his first career hat trick in a 7–4 win against the Edmonton Oilers.

=== Calgary Flames (2018–2024) ===
On 23 June 2018, Lindholm was traded to the Calgary Flames along with teammate Noah Hanifin in exchange for Dougie Hamilton, Micheal Ferland, and prospect Adam Fox. He signed a six-year contract with the Flames on 16 July. In the 2018–19 season, his first in Calgary, Lindholm mostly played top-line minutes with Johnny Gaudreau and Sean Monahan; all three scored career highs in points, with Lindholm scoring 27 goals and a total of 78 points. In the following season he set another new high in goals (29) despite the season being prematurely concluded due to the onset of the COVID-19 pandemic. He was by this point establishing himself as one of the Flames' most important forwards. When the 2020 Stanley Cup playoffs were belatedly held in a bubble in the summer, the Flames defeated the Winnipeg Jets in the qualifying round before falling to the Dallas Stars in the first round. Lindholm managed two goals and four assists in 10 playoff games.

In light of the pandemic, the 2020–21 season was held with a revised format, with all Canadian teams playing in the temporary North Division. The Flames had a tumultuous year, in the course of which coach Geoff Ward was replaced midway through the season by Darryl Sutter. Sutter made significant changes to the team's approach, and returned Lindholm to the centre position after two seasons primarily playing on the right wing, now paired on a top line with wingers Gaudreau and Matthew Tkachuk that proved an immediate success. He scored 19 goals and 28 assists in only 56 games. The Flames did not qualify for the 2021 Stanley Cup playoffs.

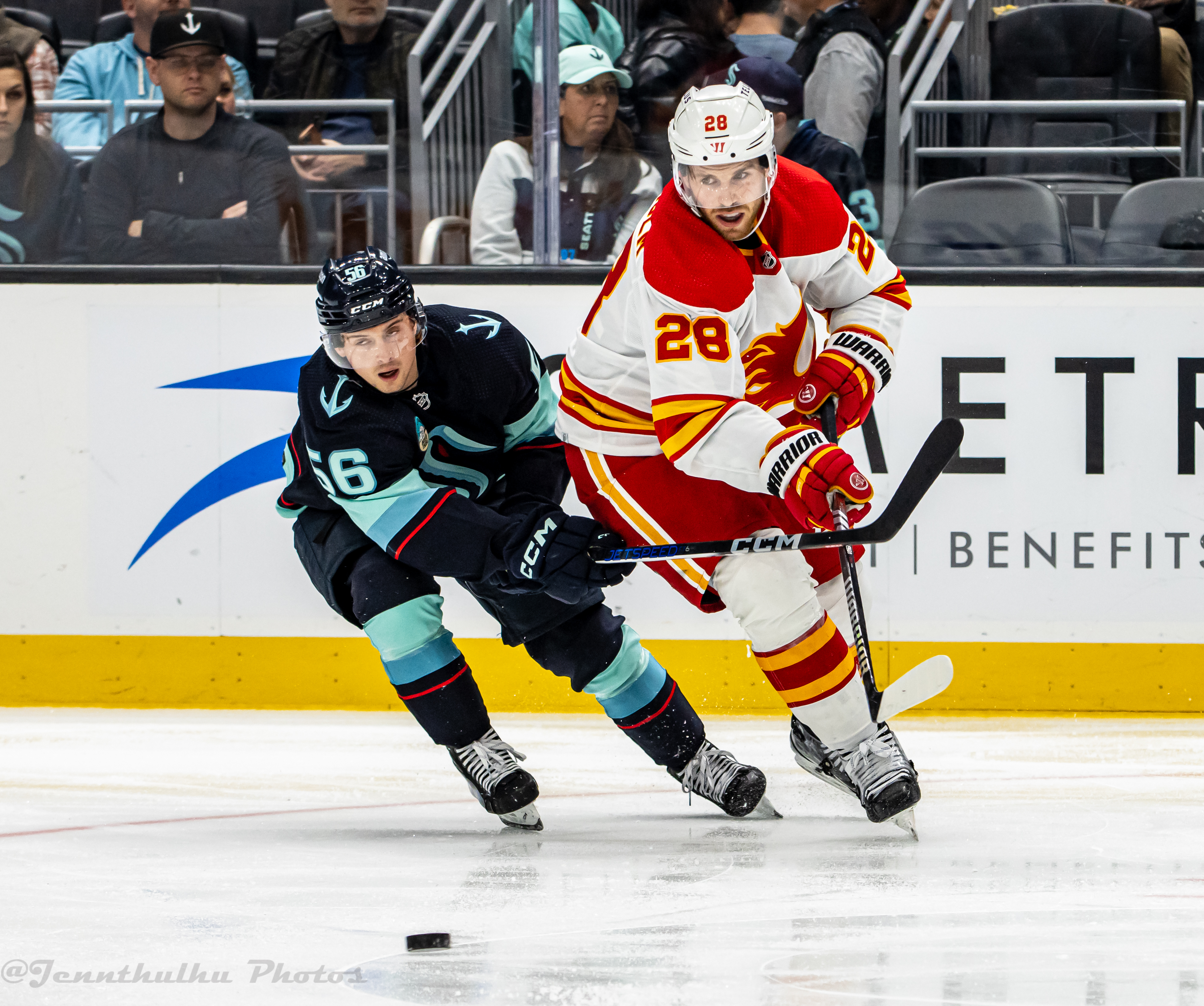
Lindholm and Kailer Yamamoto of the Seattle Kraken battle for the puck in 2023.

The NHL's divisions and format returned to their pre-pandemic norms for the 2021–22 season, the Flames' first full season for returning coach Sutter. It would prove to be one of the most successful regular seasons in team history. With Gaudreau and Tkachuk, Lindholm formed one of the most dominant forward lines in the NHL, and all three members hit numerous personal and collective milestones over the course of the season. Lindholm scored his 40th goal of the season on 23 April 2022, in a 6–3 victory over the Vancouver Canucks, hitting that marker for the first time in his career. Gaudreau and Tkachuk also scored 40 goals, the first time in 28 years that linemates had all achieved this, and only the fourth time in that span that a team had three 40-goal scorers. Lindholm finished the regular season with 42 goals and 40 assists for 82 points, while the Flames won the reconstituted Pacific Division. He was voted a finalist for the Frank J. Selke Trophy, awarded to the league's best defensive forward.

The Flames drew the Dallas Stars in the first round of the 2022 Stanley Cup playoffs, a rematch of the bubble playoffs two years prior, and a matchup in which the Flames were considered the favourites. Lindholm immediately distinguished himself by scoring the lone goal in the Flames' 1–0 victory in game 1. The Stars proved a greater challenge than many had anticipated, largely due to an exceptional performance from goaltender Jake Oettinger, but the Flames eventually won the series in game 7. The Flames drew the Edmonton Oilers in the second round, the first playoff "Battle of Alberta" in 31 years. The Oilers defeated the Flames in five games.

=== Vancouver Canucks (2024) ===
On 31 January 2024, with the Flames not in contention for a playoff spot, and in the final year of his contract, Lindholm was traded to the Vancouver Canucks in exchange for Andrei Kuzmenko, unsigned prospects Hunter Brzustewicz and Joni Jurmo, and first-round and conditional fourth-round picks in the 2024 NHL entry draft. Immediately upon joining the Canucks, Lindholm became the fifth player in franchise history to score two or more goals in their first game with the team. He also tied the franchise record for most game-winning goals recorded by a player through his first six games with the team.

=== Boston Bruins (2024–present) ===
Leaving the Canucks as a free agent at the conclusion of his contract, Lindholm signed a seven-year, $54.25 million deal with the Boston Bruins on 1 July 2024.

Lindholm had high expectations entering the 2024–25 season, and was widely seen as the Bruins' first-line center. Although he scored two goals and three assists in his first three games with the team, Lindholm started to struggle soon afterwards. He did not score a goal in 18 straight games afterwards, and managed only four assists during that time period. Lindholm was not alone, as the entire Bruins team was struggling offensively during this period, and not living up to expectations. Lindholm was named to Sweden's roster for the NHL's 4 Nations Face-Off tournament, where he went scoreless in three games. After the break, Lindholm returned to the Bruins with playoff intentions, but these hopes were dashed quickly. Lindholm and the Bruins would lose six of the next seven, and then win the next two before going on a ten-game losing streak, all-but-assuring that they would miss the playoffs, barring a miracle. Despite team's struggles, Lindholm went on a solid run to finish off the season, scoring four goals and five assists in the last eight games of the season.

== International play ==
Medal record

Men's ice hockey

Representing Sweden

World Championships
Gold medal – first place	2017 Germany/France	
Bronze medal – third place	2025 Sweden/Denmark	

World Junior Championships
Silver medal – second place	2013 Russia	
Silver medal – second place	2014 Sweden	

IIHF World U18 Championships
Silver medal – second place	2012 Czech Republic	

Ivan Hlinka Memorial Tournament
Silver medal – second place	2011 Slovakia/Czech Republic	

Lindholm represents Sweden on the international stage, and has done so on many occasions with great success.

Lindholm has played for the Sweden on the junior level on four occasions, earning a silver medal each time. These silver medals were achieved at the 2011 Ivan Hlinka Memorial Tournament, 2012 World U18 Championships, and the World Junior Championships in 2013 and 2014. He served as an assistant captain for the team in 2012 and 2014.

At the senior level, Lindholm has played for Sweden in the World Championships in 2015, 2017, 2019, and 2025. He won a gold medal with the team in 2017, and in 2025, led the tournament in goals with eight, earning a bronze medal. For his efforts in 2025, he was also named to the tournament all-star team.

Lindholm also represented Sweden at the 4 Nations Face-Off in 2025 and the 2026 Winter Olympics, where he was held scoreless in both.

== Personal life ==
Lindholm was born in Boden, Sweden, but grew up in Gävle. His father, Mikael Lindholm, is a former professional ice hockey player who played in 404 Elitserien games and 18 NHL games with the Los Angeles Kings in 1989–90. Lindholm is a cousin of ice hockey player Calle Järnkrok and the younger brother of ice hockey player Oliver Lindholm. He is not related to Hampus Lindholm. Lindholm started playing ice hockey in Hanover, Germany, at the age of three while his father was playing for the Hannover Scorpions.

== Career statistics ==
=== Regular season and playoffs ===
			Regular season					Playoffs
Season	Team	League	GP	G	A	Pts	PIM	GP	G	A	Pts	PIM
2009–10	Brynäs IF	J18	4	3	3	6	0	—	—	—	—	—
2009–10	Brynäs IF	J18 Allsv	5	1	3	4	0	—	—	—	—	—
2010–11	Brynäs IF	J18	22	10	28	38	16	—	—	—	—	—
2010–11	Brynäs IF	J18 Allsv	18	7	16	23	16	4	3	3	6	29
2010–11	Brynäs IF	J20	2	0	0	0	0	2	0	1	1	0
2011–12	Brynäs IF	J18	2	0	3	3	0	—	—	—	—	—
2011–12	Brynäs IF	J18 Allsv	2	1	3	4	0	3	1	2	3	0
2011–12	Brynäs IF	J20	36	14	35	49	45	2	1	1	2	16
2011–12	Brynäs IF	SEL	12	0	0	0	0	2	0	0	0	0
2012–13	Brynäs IF	SEL	48	11	19	30	2	4	0	0	0	4
2013–14	Carolina Hurricanes	NHL	58	9	12	21	4	—	—	—	—	—
2013–14	Charlotte Checkers	AHL	6	1	2	3	4	—	—	—	—	—
2014–15	Carolina Hurricanes	NHL	81	17	22	39	14	—	—	—	—	—
2015–16	Carolina Hurricanes	NHL	82	11	28	39	24	—	—	—	—	—
2016–17	Carolina Hurricanes	NHL	72	11	34	45	16	—	—	—	—	—
2017–18	Carolina Hurricanes	NHL	81	16	28	44	18	—	—	—	—	—
2018–19	Calgary Flames	NHL	81	27	51	78	20	5	1	1	2	4
2019–20	Calgary Flames	NHL	70	29	25	54	22	10	2	4	6	2
2020–21	Calgary Flames	NHL	56	19	28	47	22	—	—	—	—	—
2021–22	Calgary Flames	NHL	82	42	40	82	22	12	5	4	9	6
2022–23	Calgary Flames	NHL	80	22	42	64	14	—	—	—	—	—
2023–24	Calgary Flames	NHL	49	9	23	32	21	—	—	—	—	—
2023–24	Vancouver Canucks	NHL	26	6	6	12	4	13	5	5	10	4
2024–25	Boston Bruins	NHL	82	17	30	47	14	—	—	—	—	—
2025–26	Boston Bruins	NHL	69	17	31	48	38	6	2	0	2	2
SHL totals			60	11	19	30	2	6	0	0	0	4
NHL totals			969	252	400	652	253	46	15	14	29	18

=== International ===
Bold indicates led tournament

Year	Team	Event	Result	GP	G	A	Pts	PIM
2011	Sweden	IH18	2nd place, silver medalist(s)	4	2	4	6	27
2012	Sweden	U18	2nd place, silver medalist(s)	4	2	1	3	2
2013	Sweden	WJC	2nd place, silver medalist(s)	6	2	2	4	4
2014	Sweden	WJC	2nd place, silver medalist(s)	6	2	7	9	6
2015	Sweden	WC	5th	8	2	4	6	6
2017	Sweden	WC	1st place, gold medalist(s)	10	5	2	7	10
2019	Sweden	WC	5th	8	1	5	6	2
2025	Sweden	4NF	3rd	3	0	0	0	2
2025	Sweden	WC	3rd place, bronze medalist(s)	10	**8**	6	14	0
2026	Sweden	OG	7th	4	0	0	0	2
Junior totals				20	8	14	22	39
Senior totals				43	16	17	33	22

== Awards and honours ==
Award	Year	Ref
J20 SuperElit
J20 SuperElit Best Forward	2012	
SHL
Le Mat Trophy champion	2012	
NHL
Viking Award	2019	
NHL All-Star Game	2024	
International
World Championship All-Star Team	2025	
World Championship Top 3 Player on Team	2025	

Awards and achievements
Preceded by Ryan Murphy	Carolina Hurricanes first-round draft pick 2013	Succeeded by Haydn Fleury
Preceded by William Karlsson	Viking Award; 2019	Succeeded by Incumbent
