= Palace Theatre, Calgary =

Historic building in Calgary, Alberta

Palace Theatre
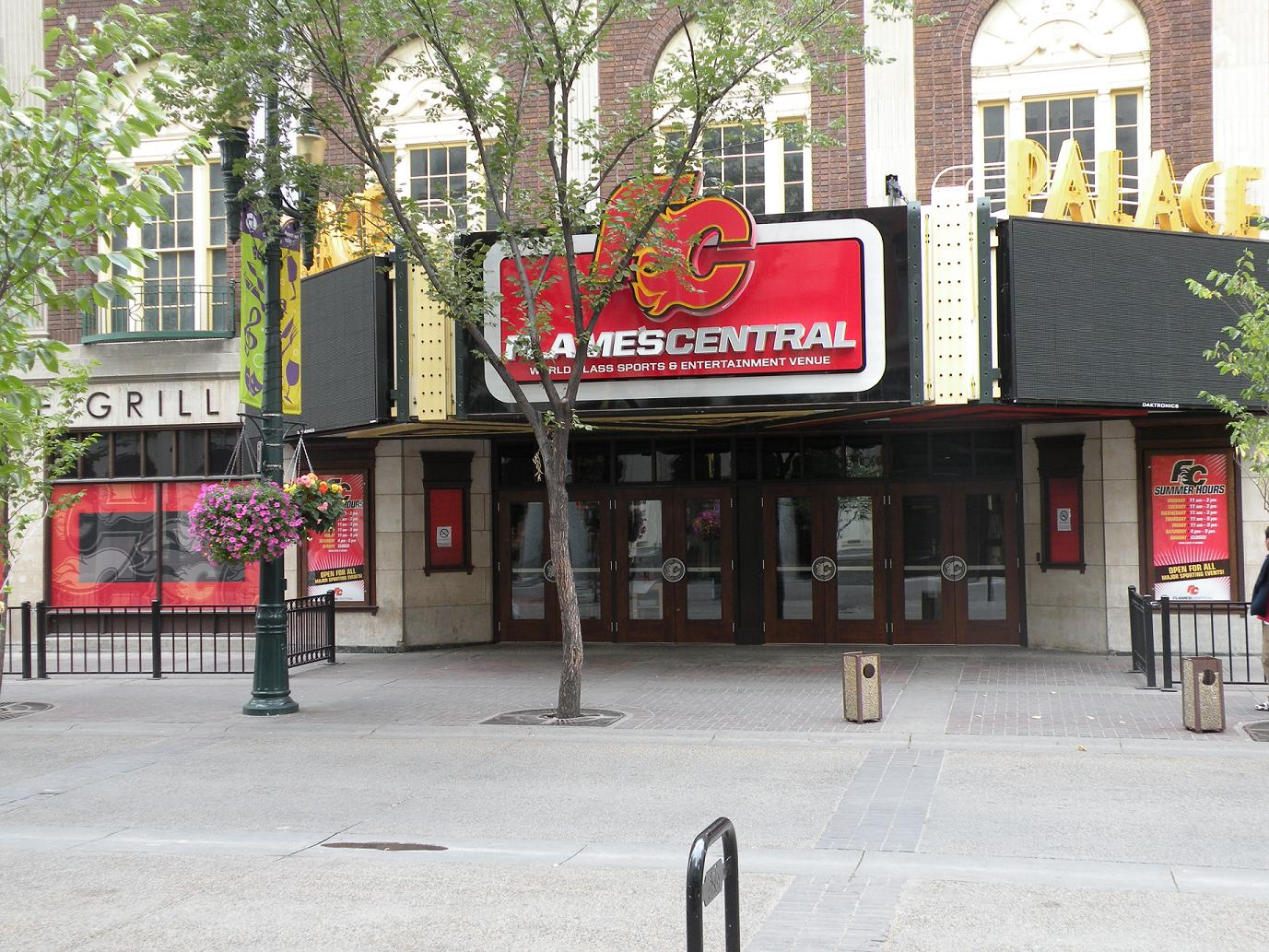
- Palace Theatre in 2008
- Interactive map of Palace Theatre
- Former names: Allen's Palace Theatre

General information
- Architectural style: Neoclassical
- Location: 219 8th Avenue Southwest, Calgary, Alberta, Canada
- Coordinates: 51°02′43″N 114°04′00″W
- Completed: 1921

Design and construction
- Architect: C. Howard Crane

Website
- www.thepalacetheatre.ca

National Historic Site of Canada
- Official name: Palace Theatre National Historic Site of Canada
- Designated: September 22, 1997

The Palace Theatre is a historic building in Calgary, Alberta. It is Calgary's oldest surviving movie theatre and one of only three surviving Canadian examples of the work of American architect C. Howard Crane. Built by the Allen family, the building served as a theatre from 1921 to 1990. Located in Calgary's Stephen Avenue Mall, it operated as a nightclub from 1998 to 2004 and has been used as a sports bar and special event centre since 2007. The building was designated as a Provincial Historic Resource in 1996 and as a National Historic Site of Canada in 1997.

== History ==
The Palace Theatre was designed by American architect C. Howard Crane in 1921. It is Calgary's oldest surviving movie theatre and one of only three surviving Canadian examples of Crane's work. The theatre was built by the Allen family who, at the time, operated the largest cinema chain in Canada. Crane was the principal architect for Allen Theatres. The theatre opened on October 25, 1921 as the Allen's Palace Theatre. With 1,951 seats, it was the largest theatre in the city at the time. It was sold to Famous Players in 1923 when the Allen theatre circuit went bankrupt.

The theatre's early programs varied heavily in terms of content and included both films and live entertainment. The theatre served as the first home for the Calgary Philharmonic Orchestra. According to the Alberta Register of Historic Places, the theatre was the site of Calgary's first radio broadcast in 1922. From 1925 to 1927, William Aberhart, who would later become the founder of the Alberta Social Credit Party and premier of Alberta, broadcast his radio sermons about the Bible from the theatre's stage.

In the 1980s, the City of Calgary attempted to designate the building as a historic site. Calgary's Heritage Advisory Board spent several years studying the matter, but political priorities shifted amid the early 1980s recession and the endeavour was abandoned. The City of Calgary Heritage Advisory Board applied to the province for a designation in 1990; however, the designation was not granted since the owners at the time – Parkview Properties Ltd. – were opposed.

The building functioned as a movie theatre until February 8, 1990. The last film shown in the theatre was Tango & Cash. The 1,000 seats on the first floor of the auditorium were removed by Famous Players and sold to other businesses throughout the city. In 1993, the building was used as a movie set for Legends of the Fall.

Several attempts were made to re-purpose the building in the 1990s. In September 1994, Dancers' Studio West announced a plan to raise $7 million to purchase the building from Capital Life Insurance of Colorado and convert it into a performing arts centre. However, the company failed to raise the necessary funds. In January 1996, Opus Development Ltd. announced a plan to purchase the building and lease it to Winners, with the intent of opening the store on October 25, exactly 75 after the building first opened its doors. However, the building was designated a Provincial Historic Resource in May 1996, meaning no changes could be made to the building without government approval. The company's plans included removing the theatre's balcony to accommodate two stories of retail space, which the province's heritage officials rejected and the proposal ultimately fell through. The building was designated as a National Historic Site of Canada on September 22, 1997.

The building remained vacant until it was acquired by a consortium of business owners known as the Pharaoh's Group in 1998. It re-opened on May 13, 1998, as a 1,200-patron nightclub called the Palace. During the $4.1 million renovation, a wallet belonging to one of the theatre's patrons that had been lost 42 earlier was found and returned to the owner's family. The nightclub closed down in February 2004 and the building remained vacant for another three years.

The building was later acquired by Atlas Development Corp. The building was leased to Concorde Entertainment Group and, in 2007, the company partnered with the Calgary Flames to convert the theatre into a 1,200-capacity sports bar and special event facility called Flames Central. Following another $2 million renovation, Flames Central opened in March 2007. In 2017, the establishment's name was changed to Palace Theatre.

== Architecture and style ==
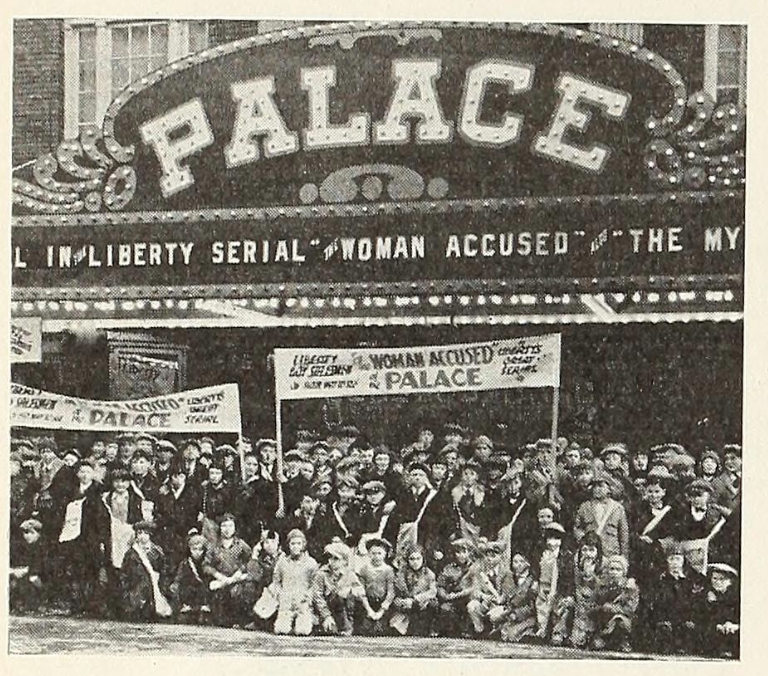
Palace Theatre in 1933

The building was designed in the Neoclassical style and features a symmetrical façade with evenly spaced fluted pilasters capped with Corinthian capitals, an oversized cornice, and classical detailing in the window surrounds. Other ornamentation includes the carved stones above the second-storey windows, and the faux wrought iron balconies.

== See also ==
- List of National Historic Sites of Canada in Alberta
