= Danforth Music Hall =

Music venue in Toronto, Ontario, Canada

The Danforth Music Hall
- Canada's First Super-Suburban Photoplay Palace
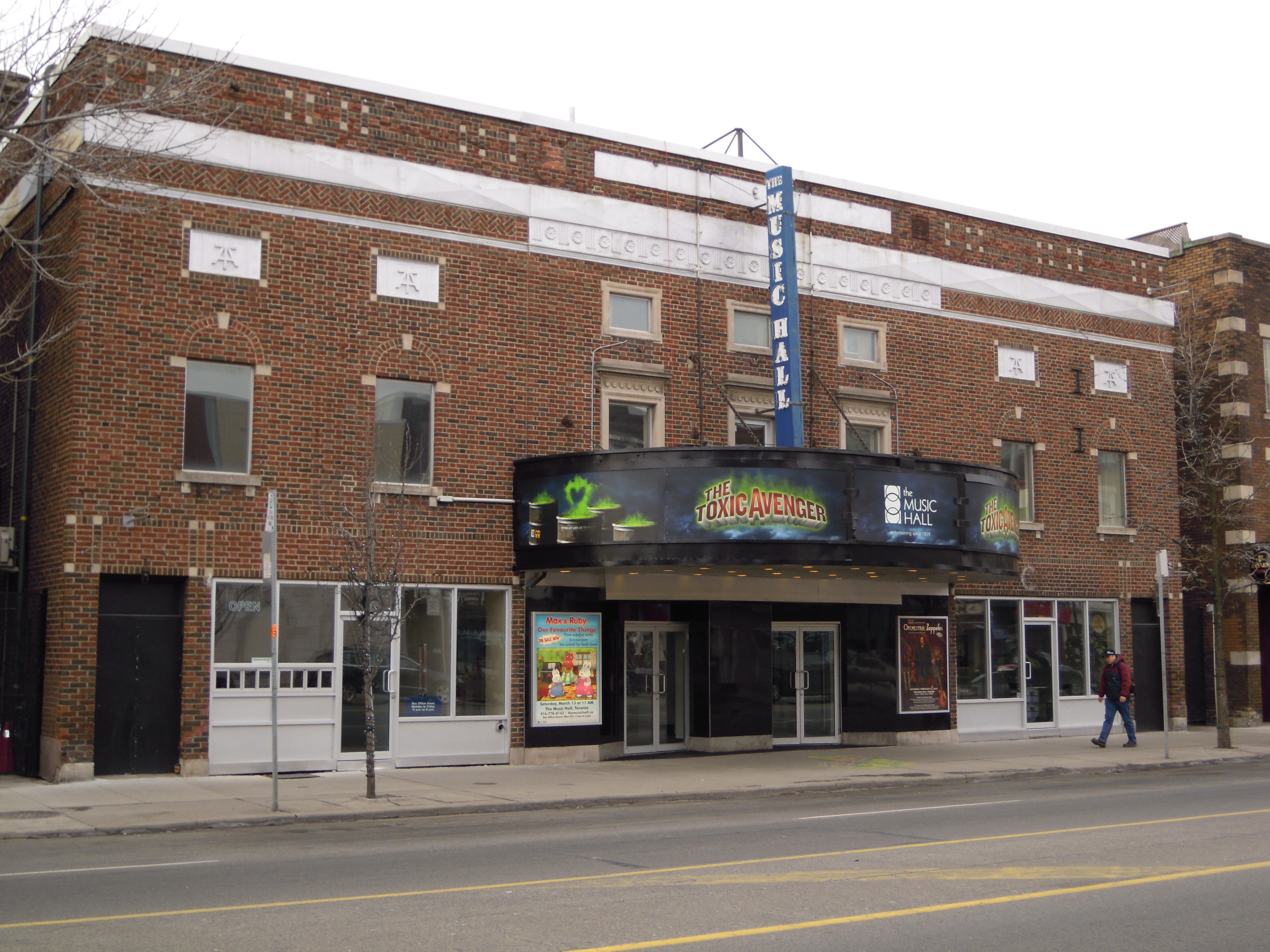
- Exterior of building in 2010
- Interactive map of The Danforth Music Hall
- Former names: Allen's Danforth Theatre (1919–23); Century Theatre (1929–69); Titania Theatre (1970–78); The Music Hall (1978–2011)
- Location: 147 Danforth Avenue; Toronto, Ontario, Canada
- Coordinates: 43°40′35″N 79°21′25″W
- Owner: Impresario Inc.
- Capacity: 1,427 (general admission); 1,145 (reserved seating)
- Type: Music venue

Construction
- Groundbreaking: November 1918
- Opened: 18 August 1919
- Renovated: 1929, 1934, 1947-48, 1985, 2005-06, 2010-11
- Closed: 2004-06
- Architects: Hynes, Feldman, and Watson

Website
- thedanforth.com

Ontario Heritage Act
- Designated: 1985

The Danforth Music Hall (originally Allen's Danforth Theatre) is a music venue and event theatre on Danforth Avenue in the neighbourhood of Riverdale in Toronto, Ontario, Canada. It is served by Broadview station on the TTC's Bloor–Danforth line. The building was designated as a property of historic interest under the Ontario Heritage Act in 1985.

== History ==
=== Opening ===
Originally constructed as a movie theatre in 1919, the building was first known as Allen's Danforth Theatre, after its owner the Allen Theatres chain. Promoted as "Canada’s First Super-Suburban Photoplay Palace", the theatre opened in the midst of both a building boom along Danforth Avenue (due to the opening of the Prince Edward Viaduct) and a boom in the construction of movie theatres following the First World War. Allen's Danforth Theatre opened on August 18, 1919, and the first feature film shown was Goldwyn Pictures' Through the Wrong Door, starring Madge Kennedy.

=== Architecture ===
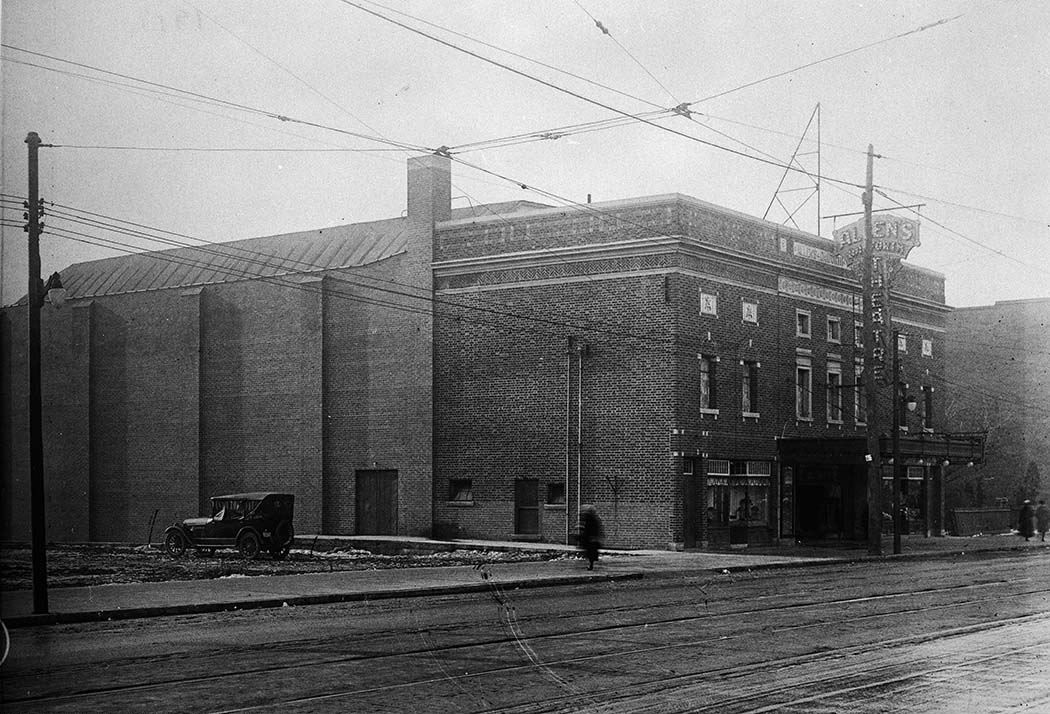
Allen's Danforth Theatre shortly after its completion in 1919

Although the Danforth Theatre was one of the jewels in the Allen Theatres chain, it followed the same general architectural style of all Allen theatres. Instead of the heavy ornamentation that characterized many cinemas of the period, the interiors were primarily intended to be spacious and comfortable, with muted and complementary colours, and restrained classical plaster detailing. Building exteriors were symmetrical, typically containing both Palladian and Georgian Revival elements, including repeating low-relief classical ornamentation.

The front façade of the Danforth building retains most of its original architectural features, including extensive Flemish bond and herringbone brickwork, opal glass windows and a marquee of chains. Stylized "AT" symbols, representing the Allen Theatres chain, also remain on the façade.

=== Post-Allen incarnations ===
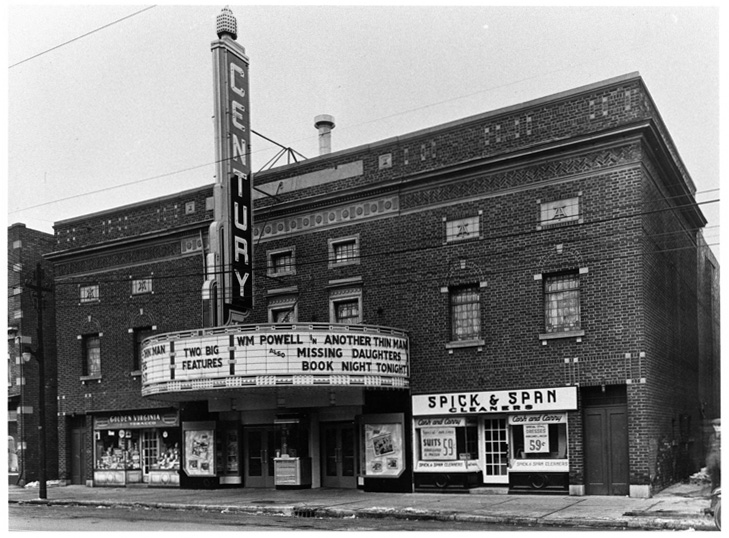
The Century Theatre, c. 1939

In 1923, the Allen Theatres chain was facing financial pressures, and most of its theatres were acquired by the Famous Players chain. The name of Allen's Danforth Theatre was changed to the Century Theatre, and it was managed by a Famous Players subsidiary, the B&F chain. The theatre remained a first-run movie house until the late 1960s, and it subsequently served as a Greek language cinema known as the Titania Theatre from 1970 to 1978.

The theatre gained the Music Hall name when it started featuring live acts in the late 1970s. Later, it began showing second-run films, ultimately becoming part of Toronto's Festival Chain of repertory cinemas in 1998. Over the years, a number of films and television series have had scenes filmed in the theatre, including Highlander: The Raven, Chicago, How to Lose a Guy in 10 Days, 54, Bulletproof Monk, Focus and Life with Judy Garland: Me and My Shadows.

=== 2006 re-opening ===
The theatre closed in 2004, and it remained vacant for a year and a half. Age and neglect had taken their toll, and the building had almost deteriorated beyond repair. New owners acquired the theatre, retaining the Music Hall name, and renovated and restored it, including the installation of a new sound system and new seating. Operating as a venue for live performances, the theatre was named the "Performing Arts Centre of the Year" (under 1500 capacity) at the 2008 Canadian Music Industry Awards.

In August 2010, bailiffs seized the property and closed the theatre due to non-payment of rent. The venue was used for the occasional show during its closure, and it has been reopened since December 1, 2011, under the ownership of Impresario Inc. Since December 2011, the hall has hosted notable shows by the likes of Rihanna, Justin Bieber, Lorde, Disclosure, Father John Misty, St. Vincent, Metric, Iggy Azalea, Run The Jewels, FKA Twigs, Lights, OMD, Billy Bragg, Dave Chappelle, and RuPaul's Drag Race.

== See also ==
- Lee's Palace, which was originally Allen's Bloor Theatre
- List of music venues in Toronto
