= Mikael Lindholm =

Swedish ice hockey player

- Born: 19 December 1964 (age 61) Gävle, Sweden
- Height: 6 ft 1 in (185 cm)
- Weight: 194 lb (88 kg; 13 st 12 lb)
- Position: Centre
- Shot: Left
- Played for: Brynäs IF; Los Angeles Kings; Bodens IK; Luleå HF; Malmö Redhawks; Timrå IK
- NHL draft: 237th overall, 1987; Los Angeles Kings
- Playing career: 1986–2001

Mikael Lindholm (born 19 December 1964) is a Swedish former professional ice hockey player who played for the Los Angeles Kings in the National Hockey League. His son Elias Lindholm is a professional ice hockey player and was selected by the Carolina Hurricanes in the 1st round (5th overall) of the 2013 NHL Entry Draft. Lindholm is also the uncle of Toronto Maple Leafs centre Calle Järnkrok.

== Career statistics ==
			Regular season					Playoffs
Season	Team	League	GP	G	A	Pts	PIM	GP	G	A	Pts	PIM
1979–80	Gävle GIK	Division 2	11	0	1	1	—	—	—	—	—	—
1981–82	Gävle GIK	Division 1	18	3	3	6	8	—	—	—	—	—
1982–83	Gävle GIK	Division 1	27	6	7	13	44	—	—	—	—	—
1983–84	Strömsbro IF	Division 1	20	9	10	19	4	—	—	—	—	—
1984–85	Strömsbro IF	Division 1	30	14	17	31	29	—	—	—	—	—
1985–86	Strömsbro IF	Division 1	32	15	20	35	26	—	—	—	—	—
1986–87	Brynäs IF	SHL	36	8	9	17	46	—	—	—	—	—
1987–88	Brynäs IF	SHL	38	9	8	17	56	—	—	—	—	—
1988–89	Brynäs IF	SHL	40	9	17	26	98	4	0	0	0	4
1989–90	Los Angeles Kings	NHL	18	2	2	4	2	—	—	—	—	—
1989–90	New Haven Nighthawks	AHL	28	4	16	20	24	—	—	—	—	—
1990–91	Phoenix Roadrunners	IHL	70	16	45	61	92	11	0	12	12	14
1991–92	Brynäs IF	SHL	36	7	11	18	24	5	0	1	1	2
1992–93	Brynäs IF	SHL	15	2	3	5	16	—	—	—	—	—
1993–94	Bodens IK	Division 1	36	19	22	41	44	—	—	—	—	—
1994–95	Bodens IK	Division 1	36	10	19	29	48	—	—	—	—	—
1995–96	Luleå HF	SHL	39	7	13	20	40	13	3	3	6	16
1996–97	Luleå HF	SHL	46	6	14	20	55	10	1	4	5	6
1997–98	Hannover Scorpions	DEL	38	6	6	12	0	9	1	3	4	18
1998–99	MIF Redhawks	SHL	46	6	12	18	60	8	2	1	3	18
1999–00	MIF Redhawks J20	SuperElit	1	0	0	0	0	—	—	—	—	—
1999–00	MIF Redhawks	SHL	48	3	15	18	114	6	0	1	1	12
2000–01	Timrå IK	SHL	14	0	5	5	12	—	—	—	—	—
NHL totals			18	2	2	4	2	—	—	—	—	—
SHL totals			358	57	107	164	521	46	6	10	16	58
