= Calgary Flames =

National Hockey League team in Calgary, Alberta

- 2026–27 Calgary Flames season
- Conference: Western
- Division: Pacific
- Founded: 1972
- History: Atlanta Flames; 1972–1980; Calgary Flames; 1980–present
- Home arena: Scotiabank Saddledome
- City: Calgary, Alberta
- Team colours: Red, yellow, white
- Media: Sportsnet West; CHQR (QR Calgary 770AM)
- Owner(s): Calgary Sports and Entertainment (N. Murray Edwards, chairman)
- General manager: Craig Conroy
- Head coach: Ryan Huska
- Captain: Mikael Backlund
- Minor league affiliates: Calgary Wranglers (AHL); Rapid City Rush (ECHL)
- Stanley Cups: 1 (1988–89)
- Conference championships: 3 (1985–86, 1988–89, 2003–04)
- Presidents' Trophies: 2 (1987–88, 1988–89)
- Division championships: 8 (1987–88, 1988–89, 1989–90, 1993–94, 1994–95, 2005–06, 2018–19, 2021–22)
- Official website: nhl.com/flames

The Calgary Flames are a professional ice hockey team based in Calgary. The Flames compete in the National Hockey League (NHL) as a member of the Pacific Division in the Western Conference. They are the city's third major professional ice hockey team, after the Calgary Tigers (1921–1927) and the Calgary Cowboys (1975–1977). The Flames are one of two NHL franchises based in Alberta, the other being the Edmonton Oilers; the cities' proximity has led to a rivalry known as the "Battle of Alberta".

The team was founded in 1972 in Atlanta as the Atlanta Flames. In 1980, they moved to Calgary, where they played their first three seasons at the Stampede Corral, then moved in 1983 to the Scotiabank Saddledome (originally the Olympic Saddledome). In 1985–86, the Flames became the first team from Calgary since the 1923–24 Tigers to compete for the Stanley Cup. In 1989, the Flames won their first and only Stanley Cup title. The Flames' unexpected run to the 2004 Stanley Cup Final gave rise to the Red Mile, and in 2011, the team hosted and won the second Heritage Classic outdoor game.

The Flames have won two Presidents' Trophies for posting the NHL's top regular-season record and have claimed eight division championships. The franchise leader in games played, goals, and points is Jarome Iginla, a two-time winner of the Maurice "Rocket" Richard Trophy as the NHL's leading goal scorer. Miikka Kiprusoff has the most wins by a goaltender in a Calgary Flames uniform. 17 people associated with the Flames have been inducted into the Hockey Hall of Fame.

== History ==
=== Atlanta Flames (1972–1980) ===
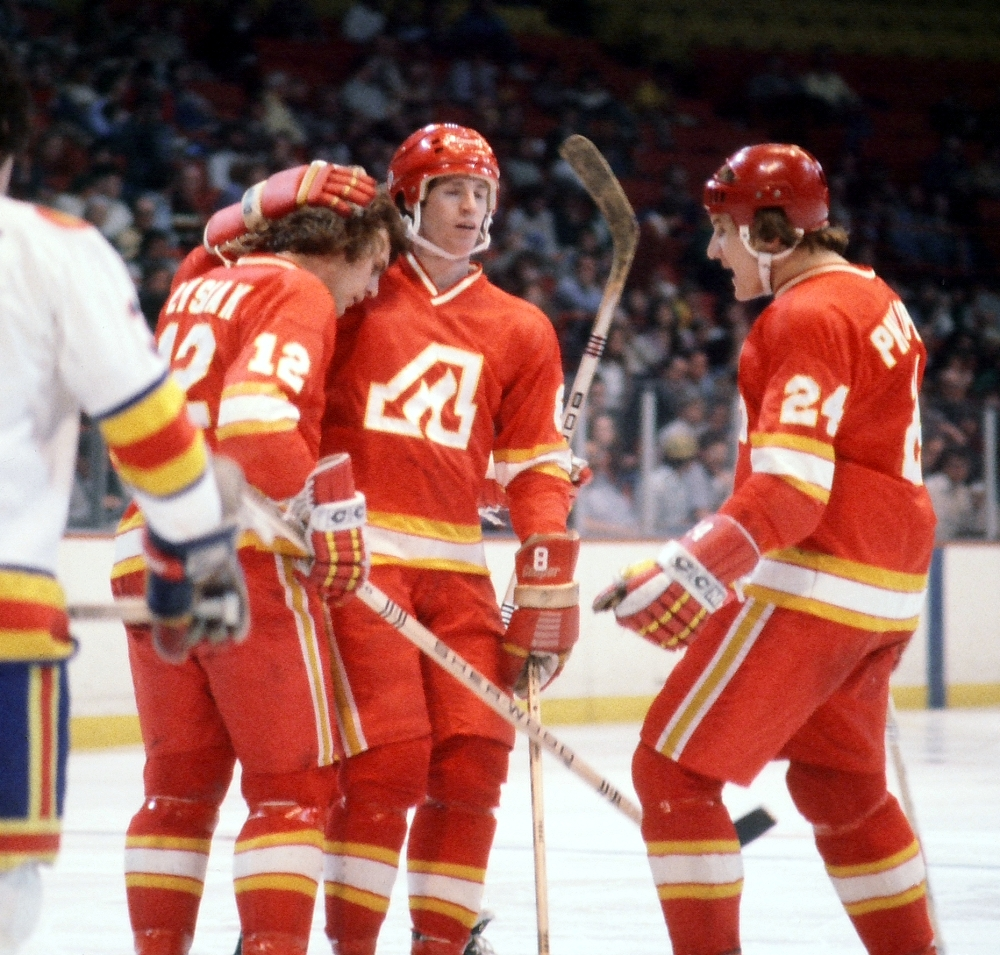
Tom Lysiak celebrates with teammates after a goal against the Colorado Rockies. From 1972 to 1980, the Flames were based in Atlanta.

In December 1971, the NHL granted expansion teams to Long Island (the New York Islanders) and Atlanta, as part of an effort to keep the upstart World Hockey Association (WHA) from adding cities. Atlanta owner Tom Cousins named the team the "Flames" after the fire started by General William Tecumseh Sherman's troops in the American Civil War, in which Atlanta was nearly destroyed. Under head coaches Bernie "Boom Boom" Geoffrion, Fred Creighton and Al MacNeil, the Flames made the playoffs in six of their eight seasons in Atlanta although they won just two postseason games.

In 1980, Cousins was forced to sell the Flames to prevent bankruptcy. With few serious offers from local groups, he accepted an offer from Canadian entrepreneur Nelson Skalbania. Skalbania retained the Flames name, feeling it would be a good fit for an oil town like Calgary, while the flaming "A" logo was replaced by a flaming "C". Skalbania sold his interest in 1981, and the Flames have been locally owned since, first under Calgary Flames Limited Partnership, then Calgary Sports and Entertainment in 2012.

=== Early years in Calgary (1980–1985) ===
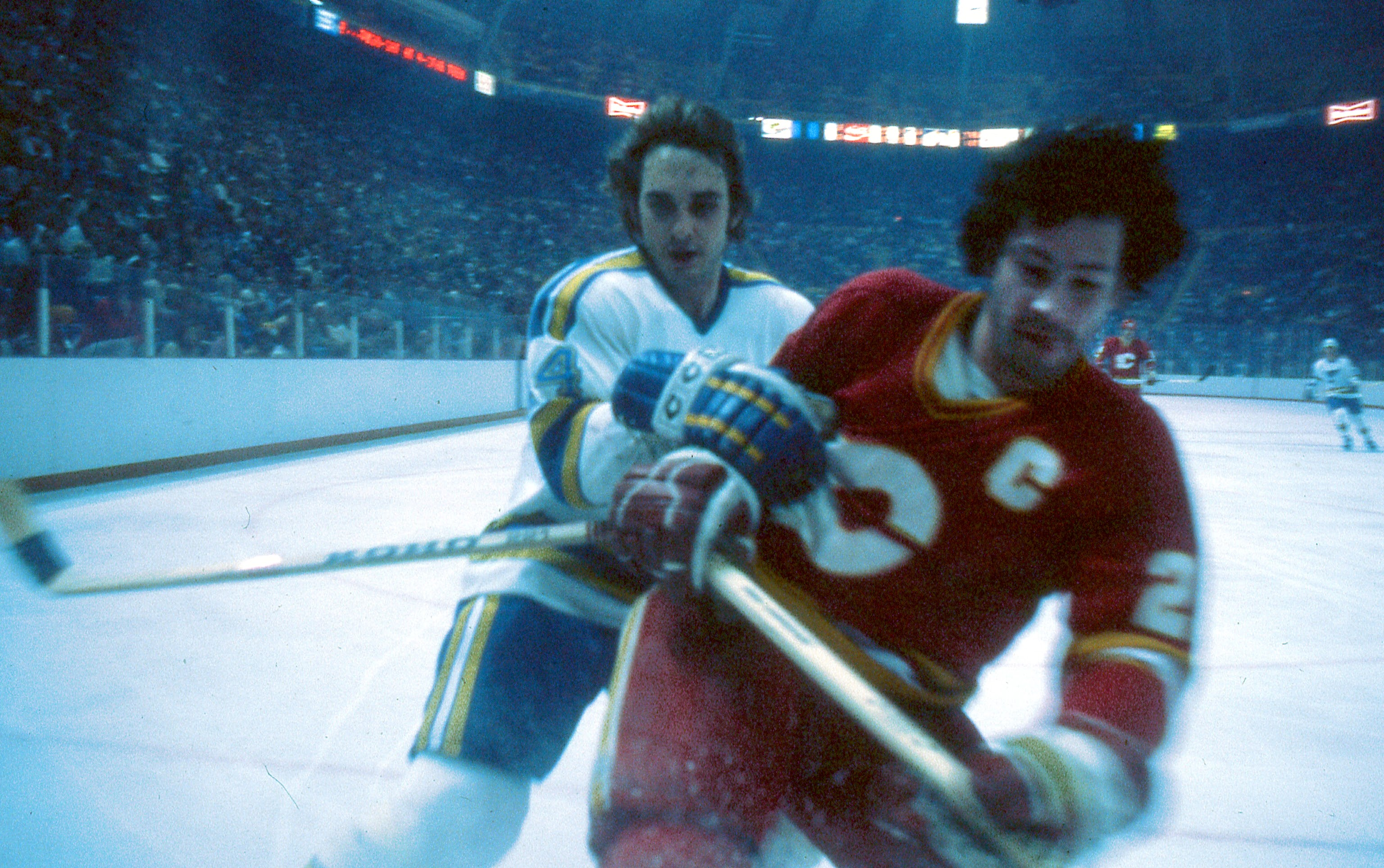
Brad Marsh with the Flames during the 1980–81 season. The team found greater playoff success, qualifying for the Stanley Cup playoffs for their first eleven seasons after moving to Calgary.

The Flames were immediately embraced by the city of Calgary, with the Flames selling 10,000 full- and half-season ticket packages in the 7,000-seat Stampede Corral. The Flames qualified for the playoffs in their first season in Calgary with a 39–27–14 record, good for third in the Patrick Division. The team won their first two playoff series over the Chicago Black Hawks and Philadelphia Flyers before losing to the Minnesota North Stars in the semifinals. This early success was not soon repeated. After a losing record in 1981–82, Fletcher traded or did not renew several contracts of holdovers from the Atlanta team and rebuilt the roster.

Among Fletcher's management decisions, including acquiring Hakan Loob, Fletcher was among the first to draft players from the Soviet Union, including CSKA Moscow star Sergei Makarov in 1983. The team improved to challenge the Oilers, who required the maximum seven games to defeat the Flames en route to their 1984 Stanley Cup championship. In 1983, the Flames moved into the Olympic Saddledome, a venue originally built for the 1988 Winter Olympics.

=== Presidents' Trophies and Stanley Cup Final (1985–1990) ===
Although the Flames made the playoffs, they were usually unable to transform that success into a deep playoff run, largely because of their provincial rivals, the Edmonton Oilers. The NHL's playoff structure at the time made it likelier that the Flames would meet the Oilers in either the first or second round. From 1983 until 1990, either the Oilers or the Flames represented the Campbell Conference in the Stanley Cup Final.

By 1986, the Flames acquired forwards Doug Risebrough, Lanny McDonald and Dan Quinn, defenceman Al MacInnis and goaltender Mike Vernon. They finished second in the Smythe with a 40–31–9 record (the only season from 1984 to 1991 in which they did not finish with 90 or more points). In the playoffs, they swept the Winnipeg Jets in three games. In the second round, the Flames upset the Oilers in seven games when the series-winning goal came when an errant clearing attempt by Steve Smith ricocheted off goaltender Grant Fuhr's leg and into his own net. From there, the Flames defeated the St. Louis Blues in the Campbell Conference finals in another seven-game series, advancing into the Stanley Cup Final for the first time. The Flames lost to the Montreal Canadiens in five games.

The Flames followed their run to the Stanley Cup Final with their best regular season with a 46–31–3 record, good for third overall in the NHL. The Flames were unable to duplicate their playoff success of a year earlier, losing their first-round match-up with the Jets in six games. The season was also difficult off the ice, as 1986 first-round draft pick George Pelawa was killed in a car accident before the season.

Under new head coach Terry Crisp, the Flames recorded their first 100-point season in 1987–88, earning the Presidents' Trophy for having the NHL's best record. Joe Nieuwendyk became the second rookie in NHL history to score at least 50 goals in a season, earning the Calder Memorial Trophy as rookie of the year. Looking to bolster the line-up for a playoff run, the Flames traded Brett Hull and Steve Bozek to the Blues for Rob Ramage and Rick Wamsley. Their playoff frustrations continued against the Oilers as they were swept in four games in the second round.

In 1988–89, the Flames captured their second consecutive Presidents' Trophy with a franchise-record 117 points. Fletcher continued to tinker with the roster, acquiring Doug Gilmour as part of a six-player deal at the trade deadline. En route to their second Final appearance, they defeated the Vancouver Canucks in seven games, the Los Angeles Kings in four games, and in the conference finals, they eliminated the Blackhawks in five games. The Flames defeated the Montreal Canadiens in the 1989 Stanley Cup Final, winning their first Stanley Cup. Al MacInnis captured the Conn Smythe Trophy as playoffs' most valuable player, while long-time captain Lanny McDonald announced his retirement. Sonia Scurfield, the Flames's co-owner, became the first Canadian woman to have her name engraved on the Cup.

In 1989, the Soviets permitted a group of Soviet hockey players to sign with NHL teams beginning in 1989–90. Sergei Makarov joined the Flames that season and, though already in his 30s, became the fifth Flame to win the Calder Memorial Trophy as the NHL's rookie of the year. The selection proved controversial, prompting the NHL to amend the rules to exclude any player over age 26 from future consideration. That season, the team fell two points shy of their third-straight Presidents' Trophy with 99 points. In the playoffs, they were defeated in six games by the Los Angeles Kings.

=== Playoff contention to playoff drought (1991–2003) ===
In 1991, Fletcher left the Flames to become the general manager of the Toronto Maple Leafs. He had been the team's general manager since its inception in 1972. He was succeeded in Calgary by Doug Risebrough, who completed a ten-player mega-trade that saw forward Doug Gilmour dealt to Toronto with four other players in exchange for former 50-goal scorer Gary Leeman and four others. The trade backfired on the Flames as Leeman scored only 11 goals for the Flames while Gilmour became a franchise player for the Maple Leafs. Despite Theoren Fleury becoming an NHL star, the Flames missed the playoffs in 1992, a year after finishing with their third 100-point season in franchise history. It was the first time they missed the playoffs since they moved.

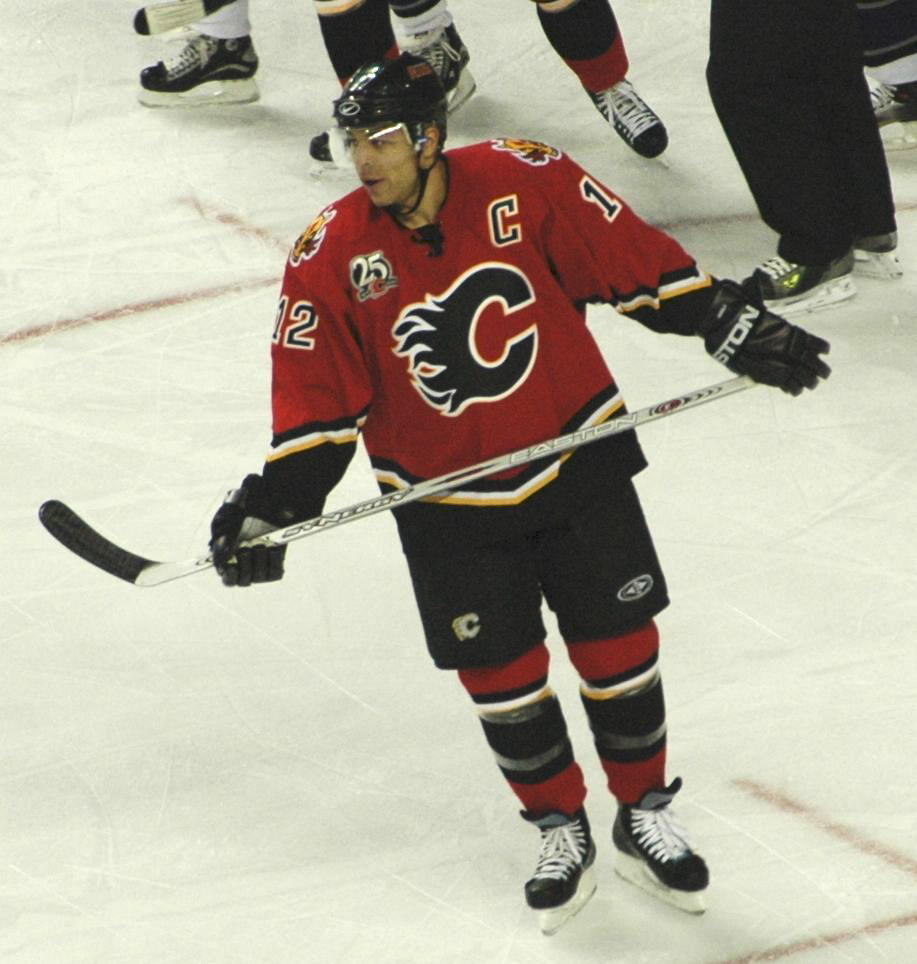
The performance of Jarome Iginla was one of the team's few bright spots during its seven-season playoff drought.

Calgary rebounded to make the playoffs for the next four seasons, including two consecutive division titles, but were eliminated in the first round of the playoffs each time. In the 1995–96 season, Joe Nieuwendyk was traded to the Dallas Stars for Jarome Iginla; Iginla made his Flames debut in the 1996 playoffs, during which the Flames again lost in the first round in a four-game sweep by the Blackhawks. In 1997, the Flames missed the playoffs and did not return for seven years. The low point came in the 1997–98 season, in which the Flames finished with only 67 points, the second-lowest point total in franchise history. In 1999, the Flames traded Fleury to the Colorado Avalanche midway through the season. The trade came shortly after Fleury became the franchise's all-time leading scorer. Although the Flames were only two points (equivalent to one win) out of a playoff spot at the time, Fleury was due to become an unrestricted free agent after the season, and the Flames were not willing to risk losing him without getting anything in return.

As the Flames sank in the standings, their attendance also sagged. For most of their first 16 years in Calgary, Flames tickets were among the toughest to get in the NHL. By 1999, attendance had fallen so severely that the owners issued an ultimatum: buy more season tickets or the team would move to the United States. The fans responded by buying enough season tickets to keep the Flames in Calgary for the 1999–2000 season. The Flames issued another appeal for more season tickets in the summer of 2000. The campaign, aimed at increasing season ticket sales from a franchise low of 8,700 to 14,000, proved successful. During this time, Iginla captured the Maurice "Rocket" Richard Trophy and Art Ross Trophy in 2001–02 as the leading goal and point scorer with 52 goals and 96 points, and Robyn Regehr became the youngest nominee ever for the Bill Masterton Memorial Trophy.

In the 2002–03 season, the Flames hired Darryl Sutter as the team's head coach, replacing Greg Gilbert. Sutter also became the team's general manager after the season, and is credited with revitalizing the franchise. Among Sutter's first moves was to acquire goaltender Miikka Kiprusoff early in the 2003–04 season, whom he had previously coached with the San Jose Sharks.

=== Jarome Iginla era and Western Conference champions (2004–2010) ===
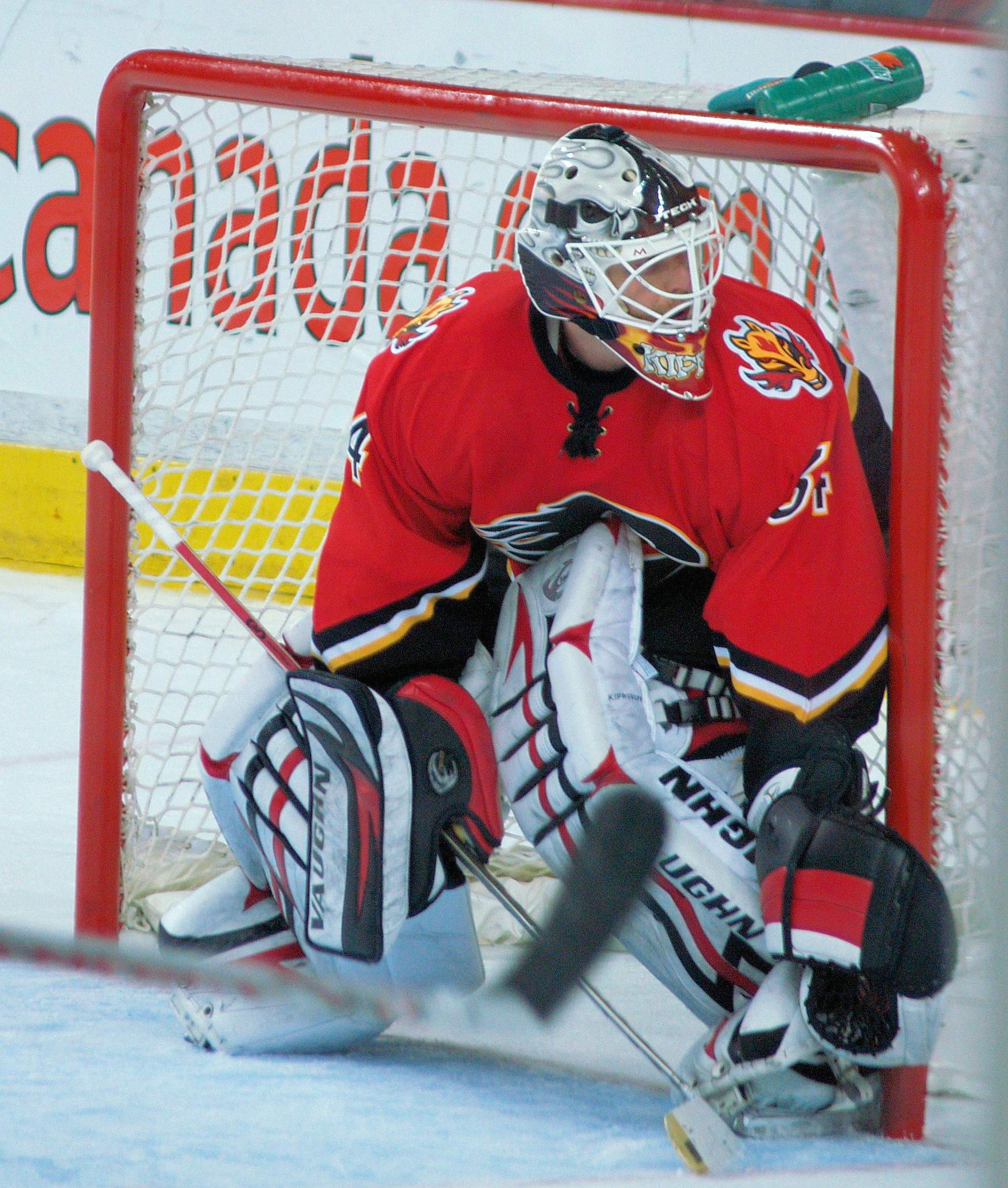
Miikka Kiprusoff won the Vezina Trophy as the NHL's top goaltender in 2005–06.

After seven consecutive seasons of not making the playoffs, the Flames returned to the postseason in 2004. They became the first team in the league's history to defeat three division champions en route to the Stanley Cup Final: the Northwest Division champion Vancouver Canucks, the Presidents' Trophy-winning Detroit Red Wings, and the Pacific Division champion San Jose Sharks.

The 2004 Stanley Cup Final against the Tampa Bay Lightning went to seven games with the Flames suffering a controversial non-goal in game six at home. Replays showed Martin Gelinas may have scored what would have been the go-ahead goal late in the third period; the referees never signalled a goal, and later replays were ruled inconclusive. The goal would have made Gelinas the only player in NHL history to score the winning goal in every playoff series. The Lightning won the game in overtime, and won game seven at home to capture the Stanley Cup.

The next season was cancelled due to the 2004–05 NHL lockout. The Flames played their 25th season in Calgary in 2005–06, finishing with 103 points. It was their best total since the 1989 Cup-winning season, and good enough to capture their first division title in 12 years. However, the Flames lost to the Mighty Ducks of Anaheim in seven games during the first round of the playoffs. Miikka Kiprusoff captured both the William M. Jennings and Vezina Trophies as the NHL's top goaltender, while Dion Phaneuf's 20 goals were the third-highest total for a rookie defenceman in NHL history.

The 2006 off-season began with a trade for Alex Tanguay, and with Sutter relinquishing his head coaching position to assistant Jim Playfair so he could focus on his duties as general manager. In the playoffs, Calgary fell in six games to the top-seeded Detroit Red Wings in the first round. During the series, the Flames were fined by the NHL for several stick-related penalties in the fifth game. Notably, backup goaltender Jamie McLennan was suspended five games for slashing Red Wings forward Johan Franzen.

In the 2007–08 off-season, the Flames demoted Playfair to associate coach, bringing in Mike Keenan as the team's head coach. During the season, Jarome Iginla became the Flames' all-time leader in games played, passing Al MacInnis' mark of 803. Iginla also passed Theoren Fleury's mark of 364 goals to become the Flames' all-time goalscoring leader on March 10, 2008. In the playoffs, they fell in the conference quarterfinals to the San Jose Sharks in seven games. Iginla continued to set franchise records in 2008–09, surpassing Fleury's franchise mark of 830 points, and scoring his 400th goal on the same night against the Tampa Bay Lightning. The team failed to advance past the first round of the playoffs, being eliminated by the Chicago Blackhawks in six games, resulting in the dismissal of head coach Mike Keenan after two seasons. Brent Sutter was named his successor on June 23, 2009, but the Flames failed to qualify for the playoffs in the 2009–10 season.

=== End of the Iginla era (2010–2013) ===
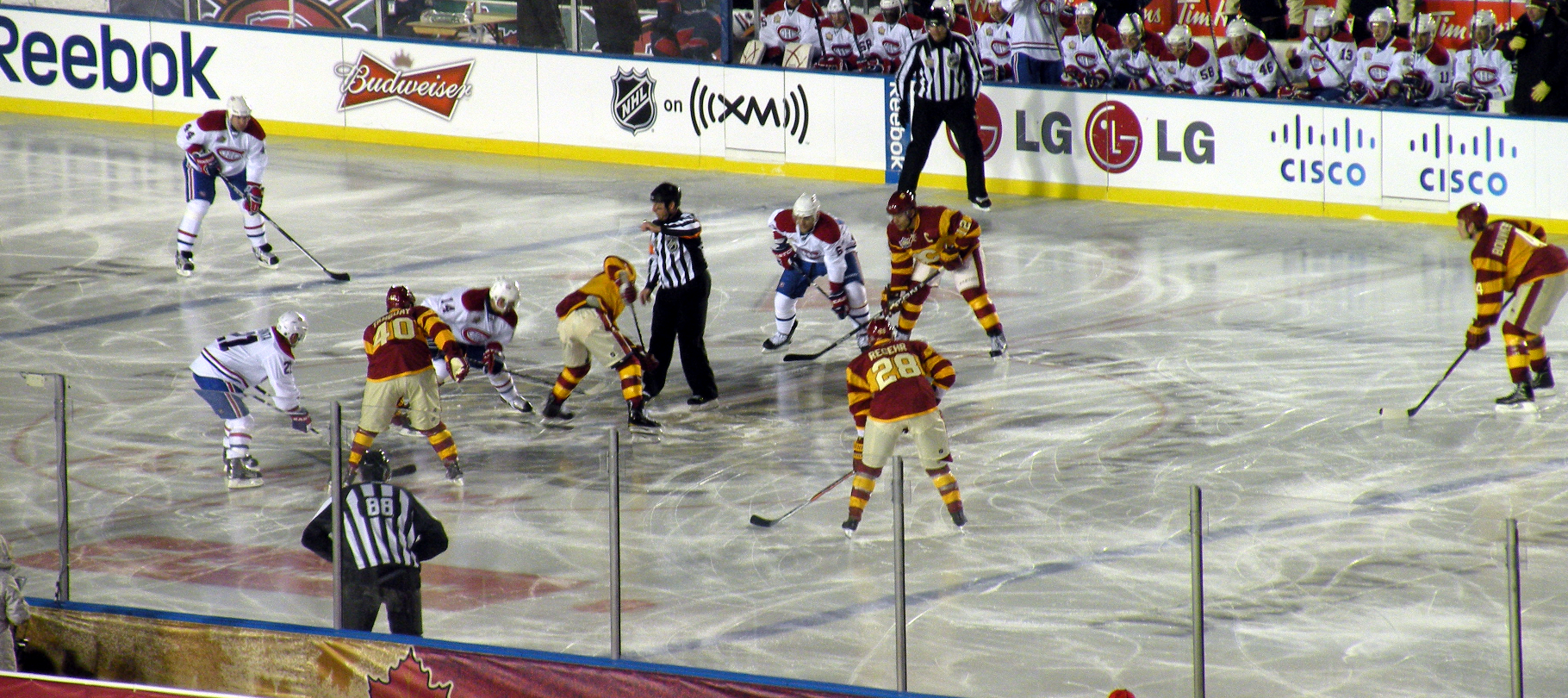
The Flames and Montreal Canadiens line up for a face-off at the 2011 Heritage Classic.

The Flames struggled at the beginning of the 2010–11 season, falling to 14th place in the conference at the Christmas break. The organization replaced Darryl Sutter with Jay Feaster, giving him the role of interim general manager. The interim tag was removed after the season's conclusion. The team pulled itself back into playoff contention after the change but failed to qualify for the playoffs, missing by three points and finishing 10th in the conference.

Calgary hosted the 2011 Heritage Classic, the NHL's second outdoor game of the year, at McMahon Stadium on February 22, 2011. The Flames defeated the Montreal Canadiens 4–0 and Kiprusoff became the first goaltender to record a shutout in an NHL outdoor game. Iginla reached two major milestones late in the season—he became the tenth player in NHL history to score at least 30 goals in ten consecutive seasons, and scored his 1,000th career point, all with the Flames. Iginla also scored his 500th career goal on January 7, 2012, against the Minnesota Wild. On March 27, 2013, Iginla was traded to the Pittsburgh Penguins in exchange for prospects Kenny Agostino and Ben Hanowski and a first-round pick in 2013, leaving the team without a captain for the first time. The Flames missed the playoffs for the fourth consecutive year in 2012–13, and selected Sean Monahan sixth overall at the 2013 NHL entry draft.

=== Giordano, Monahan, Gaudreau era (2013–2022) ===
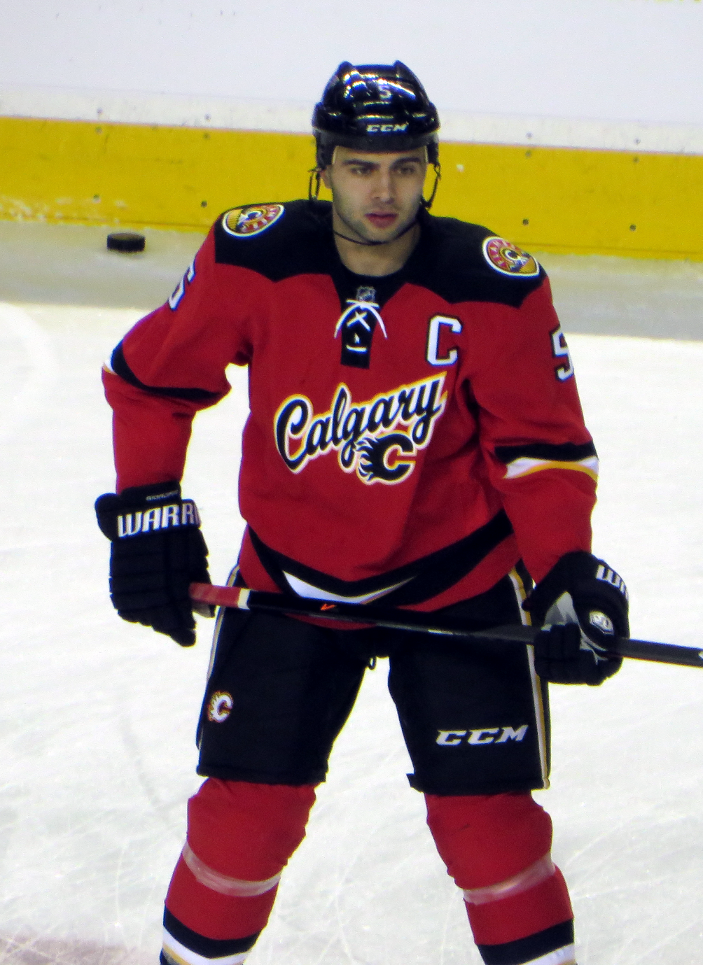
Mark Giordano was named captain after the trade of Jarome Iginla

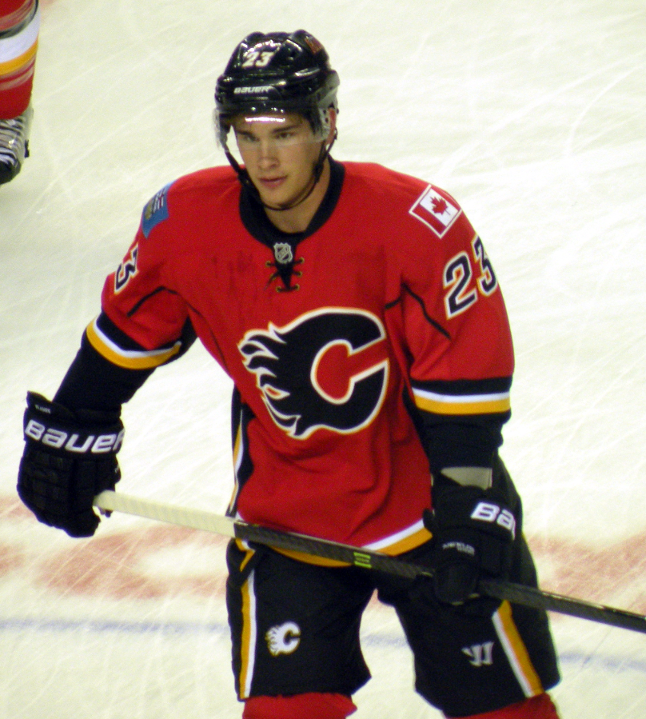
Sean Monahan was selected by the Flames in the 2013 NHL entry draft.

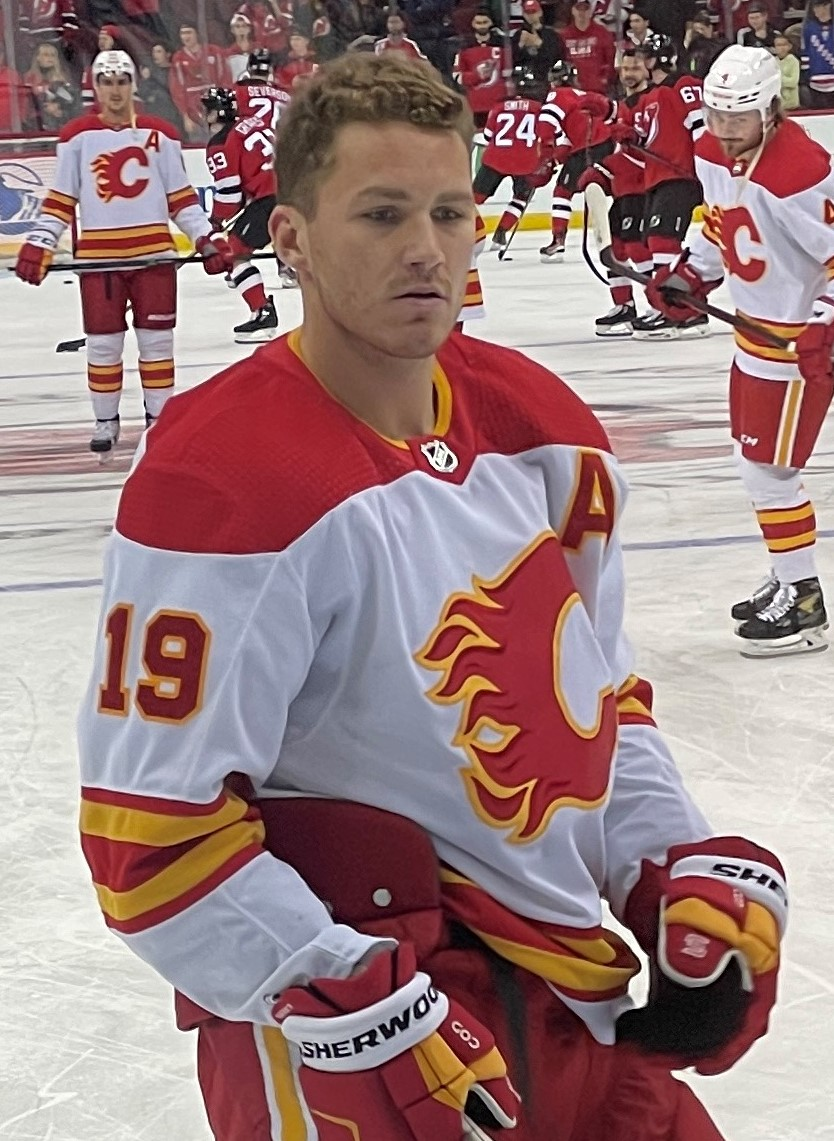
Matthew Tkachuk was selected sixth overall at the 2016 NHL entry draft by the Flames

Before the 2013–14 season, Mark Giordano was named the Flames' captain. The team fell to the sixth place in the division, and team president Brian Burke fired Feaster and took over the role on an interim basis. 2011 fourth-round draft pick Johnny Gaudreau made his NHL debut after winning the Hobey Baker Award at Boston College the day before. Gaudreau recorded his first NHL goal in the contest, the lone goal in a 5–1 Flames loss.

In the 2014–15 season, the Flames won one of their final games against the Los Angeles Kings to clinch their first playoff berth since 2009. They eliminated the Vancouver Canucks in six games in the first round of the playoffs for their first playoff series win since 2004, but were eliminated by the Anaheim Ducks in five games in the second round. Head coach Bob Hartley won the Jack Adams Trophy for coach of the year.

In the 2015–16 season, the Flames faced heightened expectations after the previous seasons. These expectations were bolstered after the acquisition of Dougie Hamilton from the Boston Bruins for a first-round pick and two second-round picks at the 2015 NHL entry draft. The Flames failed to qualify for the playoffs; as a result, head coach Hartley was fired and replaced by former Vancouver Canucks assistant coach Glen Gulutzan. The Flames picked Matthew Tkachuk as the sixth selection of the 2016 NHL entry draft.

During the off-season, the Flames had ongoing negotiations with pending restricted free agents Sean Monahan and Johnny Gaudreau; both players signed multi-year contracts. Bolstered by the emergence of the "3M Line", composed of Tkachuk, Mikael Backlund and Michael Frolík, the Flames rebounded to make the playoffs in the 2016–17 season as the conference's first wild card seed, but they were swept by the Anaheim Ducks in the first round.

The Flames failed to qualify for the playoffs in the 2017–18 season and Gulutzan was fired. Bill Peters was hired as head coach. The team made several changes to their roster before the 2018–19 season, including a trade with the Carolina Hurricanes at the 2018 NHL entry draft that sent Dougie Hamilton, Micheal Ferland, and Adam Fox to the Hurricanes in exchange for Noah Hanifin and Elias Lindholm. At the end of the regular season, they won the division title for the first time since 2006. They lost in the first round of the 2019 Stanley Cup playoffs to the Colorado Avalanche in five games. At the end of season, captain Giordano was awarded the James Norris Memorial Trophy for best defenceman of the year.

During the 2019–20 season, after former Flames's prospect Akim Aliu accused Peters of racism and physical violence, the coach was forced to take a leave of absence on November 26, pending an internal investigation. Assistant coach Geoff Ward was named the acting head coach during the investigation. Peters resigned on November 29 and Ward was named the interim head coach. Ward broke a franchise record by starting his coaching tenure with seven straight wins. The Flames only played 70 games in the regular season, which ended after March 11, 2020, due to the coronavirus pandemic. Based on their regular-season points percentage, they qualified for the playoffs as the eighth seed in the Western Conference and defeated the Winnipeg Jets in four games in the qualifying round. The Flames lost to the Dallas Stars in the first round of the playoffs in six games.

On March 4, 2021, with the Flames starting 11–11–2, Ward was fired and Sutter was re-hired as head coach of the Flames. Giordano's tenure as captain ended when he was selected by the Seattle Kraken in the 2021 NHL expansion draft. The team secured first place in the Pacific Division and returned to the playoffs after failing to qualify in 2020–21. They faced the Dallas Stars in the first round of the 2022 Stanley Cup playoffs and won the series in seven games. In their first Battle of Alberta playoff series since 1991, the Flames lost to the Oilers in five games in the second round.

=== High-profile turnover (2022–present) ===
The 2022 off-season saw the departures and arrivals of many star players. Gaudreau signed a seven-year deal to join the Columbus Blue Jackets, leaving the Flames. Tkachuk – who was a restricted free agent – said he did not want to sign a long-term deal in Calgary. After filing for club-elected salary arbitration, the Flames on July 23 traded Tkachuk and a conditional 2025 fourth-round draft pick to the Florida Panthers for forward Jonathan Huberdeau, defenceman MacKenzie Weegar, prospect Cole Schwindt, and a conditional 2025 first-round selection. As part of the trade negotiations, Tkachuk signed an eight-year contract with the Flames before being traded to the Panthers. On August 18, the Flames traded Monahan and a conditional first-round pick in 2025 to the Montreal Canadiens for future considerations. The move made room for the Flames to secure Colorado Avalanche forward Nazem Kadri, who signed a seven-year contract on the same day.

Despite losing two 100-point players, the moves made by general manager Brad Treliving were praised, with some suggesting the Flames might be a more serious Stanley Cup contender in 2022–23. The Flames missed the playoffs and Treliving left his position as general manager on April 17. Don Maloney was named the club's director of hockey operations and replaced Treliving as GM on an interim basis. On May 23, 2023, Craig Conroy was named the club's general manager after nine seasons as an assistant general manager. On June 12, Ryan Huska was named the new head coach of the team after Sutter's firing. Conroy's first trade sent leading goal-scorer Tyler Toffoli to the New Jersey Devils for Yegor Sharangovich and a 2023 third-round draft choice on June 27.

Mikael Backlund, the Flames' longest-serving player, was named captain on September 27, 2023. During the 2023–24 season, Conroy sent Elias Lindholm to the Vancouver Canucks for Andrei Kuzmenko, Hunter Brzustewicz, Joni Jurmo, a first-round and a conditional fourth-round picks in the 2024 NHL entry draft. Also among those traded were Nikita Zadorov, Chris Tanev, and Noah Hanifin. In the 2024–25 season, Kuzmenko was traded to the Philadelphia Flyers. The Flames missed the playoffs for the third consecutive season.

== Community impact ==
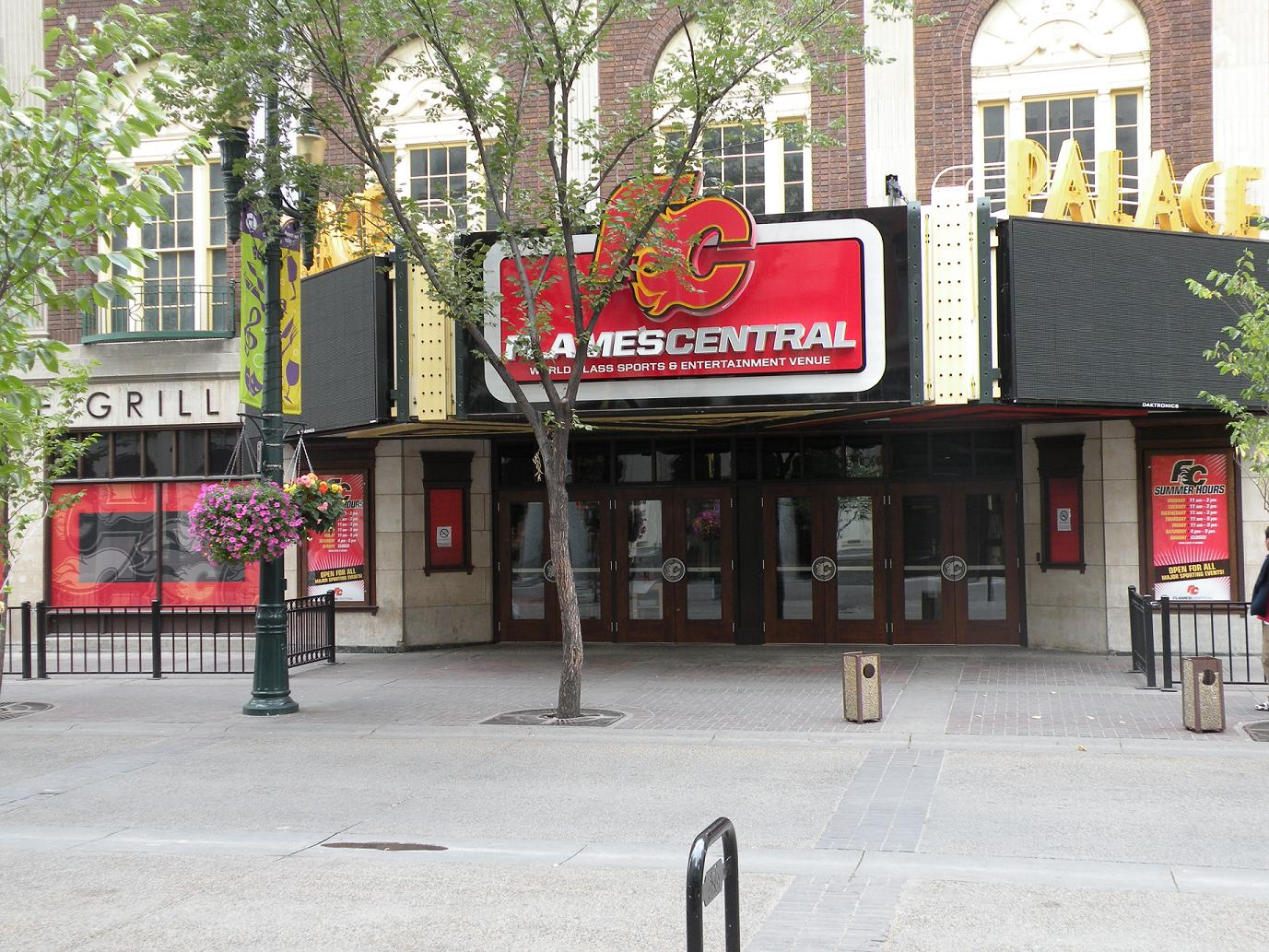
Flames Central was a downtown restaurant and bar owned by the Flames from 2006 to 2017.

Looking to fill extra dates in the Saddledome, the Flames agreed to a lease deal with the expansion Calgary Hitmen of the junior Western Hockey League who began play in 1995. Two years later, the Flames bought the team. During the 2004–05 NHL lock-out, the Flames heavily marketed the Hitmen and the team led all professional or junior hockey teams in North America in attendance, averaging over 10,000 fans per game.

In April 2006, the Flames announced they would open a restaurant-bar-entertainment facility in downtown Calgary on Stephen Avenue. One year later, Flames Central opened to the public. In 2017, the facility reverted to its original name of the Palace Theatre.

=== Flames Foundation ===
Through the team's non-profit charity, the Flames Foundation, the team has donated to causes throughout southern Alberta as of 2010. Along with the Rotary Club, the Flames helped to fund the first children's hospice in Alberta, and one of only six in North America.

The Flames are close partners with the Alberta Children's Hospital and the Gordon Townsend School housed within. The Flames participate in the Wheelchair Hockey Challenge with the Townsend Tigers.

=== "C of Red" ===
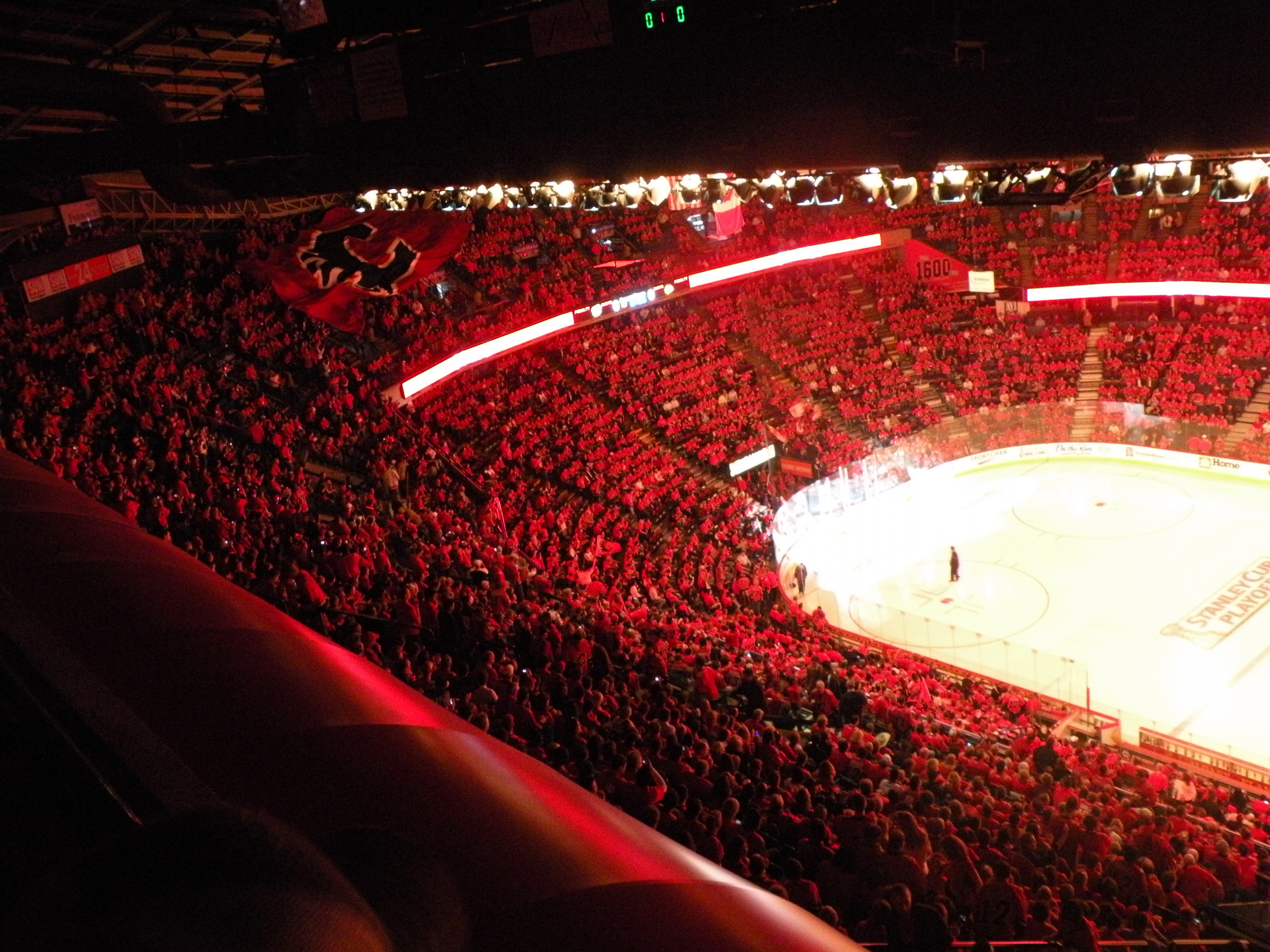
The C of Red during the 2009 Stanley Cup playoffs

The tradition of the C of Red dates back to the 1986 Stanley Cup playoffs against the Oilers. Oiler fans were donning hats promoting "Hat Trick Fever" in their quest for three straight Stanley Cups. Flames fans countered by wearing red. In the 1987 playoffs against Winnipeg, the Jets responded to the C of Red by encouraging fans to wear white, creating the "Winnipeg whiteout". During the Flames' run to the 2004 Stanley Cup Final, most of the Flames fans attending the hockey games at the Saddledome wore a red jersey with Calgary's flaming C on it. Sales of the Flames red home jersey, introduced at the start of the 2003–04 campaign, were so strong during the playoffs that manufacturer CCM stopped production on all other team jerseys to keep up with demand and the team set a league record for sales of a new uniform design. In December 2018, Calgary rock band the Dudes and the Calgary Flames organization released a cover of their hockey-themed song "Saturday Night" called "My C is Alright", paying homage to the C of Red.

=== Red Mile ===
During the Flames' run to the 2004 Stanley Cup Final, the 17th Avenue SW entertainment district, which runs west from the Scotiabank Saddledome, saw up to 35,000 fans pack the streets during the first three rounds of the playoffs, and over 60,000 in the finals. The Red Mile party received coverage in many newspapers across North America, as the parties remained peaceful and incidents were minimal despite the large number of people in a small area.

In April 2006, the Calgary Police Service announced that Red Mile gatherings would be discouraged, including traffic diversions, a zero-tolerance policy on noise and rowdy behaviour, and the presence of plain-clothed officers among the crowd to ticket offenders. After meeting with the chief of police, Mayor Dave Bronconnier convinced the Calgary Police Service to relax their ban on the "Red Mile" and encouraged people to make their way to 17th Avenue. The police retained their zero-tolerance policy on public nudity and drunkenness.

== Team information ==
=== In-game personalities ===
Since 2014, Canadian country singer George Canyon sings "O Canada" and "The Star-Spangled Banner" at most home games, accompanied by organist Warren Tse. Willy Joosen was the organist of the team until his death in July 2022.

=== Jerseys ===
Original jerseys used in 1980–1994. The design was later reinstated in 2020, with slight alterations.

Second design used in 1995–2000

The Calgary Flames' original jerseys retained the basic design the team wore in Atlanta: white jerseys with red shoulders and red and yellow stripes, and solid red jerseys with yellow and white stripes.

In 1998, to celebrate the "Year of the Cowboy", the Flames introduced its inaugural third jersey design, featuring the "flaming horse" logo on a black background. Two years later, the jersey became the Flames' road jersey, while the home jersey was updated to incorporate the same V-style striping on the arms and waist of the jersey. This jersey was relegated to third jersey status in 2003 when the NHL adopted the coloured jerseys for the home team. In 2007, with the introduction of the Rbk Edge jersey, the Flames updated their look to replace the horizontal striping with vertical striping down the sides. To honour the team's heritage, the Flames added the flags of Alberta and Canada as shoulder patches.

For the 2011 Heritage Classic, the Flames wore uniforms inspired by the Calgary Tigers, the city's first professional hockey team from the 1920s. The Flames adapted the Tigers' black-and-gold jerseys to darker shades of their own colours – maroon and burnt yellow, with a yellow stripe across the chest and alternating stripes on the sleeves. The flaming C logo and pants were cream-coloured, adding to the "vintage" look of the uniform.

In 2013, the Flames introduced a new third jersey to replace their throwback uniform. The newest design was Western-inspired, with a script Calgary in black across the front of the jersey and black shoulders with points on the front mimicking cowboy wear. This uniform was used until the 2015–16 season, after which the throwback third uniforms used from 2010 to 2013 were revived.

The 2019 Heritage Classic against the Winnipeg Jets at Regina's Mosaic Stadium featured the return of the Flames' original white uniform in the modern AdiZero cut.

In 2020, the Flames promoted the throwback alternate and Heritage Classic uniforms to primary status, while retaining the black-trimmed red uniforms as an alternate. In November 2020, along with the rest of the league, the Flames released their Reverse Retro jersey. It was similar to the 1998–2006 alternate/dark jersey, with some slight modifications such as two stripes, a yellow and red one, and nothing below those stripes. The black-trimmed red uniforms were retired after the season. In 2022, the "Blasty" black uniform returned as an alternate, adding the sublimated flame marks on the sleeves. Also in 2022, the Flames unveiled their second "Reverse Retro" uniform, using the 1994–2000 uniform but with black as the base colour. For the 2023 Heritage Classic, the Flames wore cream-based uniforms inspired by the Calgary Stampeders hockey teams of the 1950s and 1960s. The design featured a red roundel containing the full team name around the "flaming C" logo. The only yellow accents on the uniform were on the roundel itself. The uniform featured red stripes and red letters.

For the Flames' final season at the Saddledome in 2026–27, the team wore throwbacks of the black-accented red "flaming C" uniform they wore from 2003 to 2007 for four home games, all of which were against playoff teams they faced during their 2003–04 run to the Stanley Cup Final. Additionally, they wore a Saddledome-inspired red "Hometown Remix" uniform during the season.

=== Logos ===
Calgary's alternate logo, known as the Blasty, was used from 1998 to 2007, and revived in 2022.

The Flames primary logo is the "Flaming C" design, introduced when the team came to Calgary in 1980. The flaming horse logo (colloquially nicknamed "Blasty") was retired in 2007 with the introduction of the new Rbk Edge jersey. However, in 2022, the Flames announced the return of the "Blasty" logo as the team's new third jersey.

=== Mascot ===
Harvey the Hound is the Flames' mascot. He was created in 1983 to serve both with the Flames and the Calgary Stampeders of the Canadian Football League. Harvey was the first mascot in the NHL. In January 2003, Edmonton Oilers head coach Craig MacTavish ripped out the mascot's tongue as he was harassing their bench. The incident led to other NHL team mascots arriving at the 2003 All-Star Game with their tongues hanging out.

=== Minor league affiliates ===
The Flames' current American Hockey League (AHL) affiliate is the Calgary Wranglers. The Flames' current ECHL affiliate is the Rapid City Rush.

== Season-by-season record ==
This is a partial list of the last five seasons completed by the Flames. For the full season-by-season history, see List of Calgary Flames seasons

Note: GP = Games played, W = Wins, L = Losses, T = Ties, OTL = Overtime losses, Pts = Points, GF = Goals for, GA = Goals against

Season	GP	W	L	OTL	Pts	GF	GA	Finish	Playoffs
2021–22	82	50	21	11	111	293	208	1st, Pacific	Lost in second round, 1–4 (Oilers)
2022–23	82	38	27	17	93	260	252	5th, Pacific	Did not qualify
2023–24	82	38	39	5	81	253	271	5th, Pacific	Did not qualify
2024–25	82	41	27	14	96	225	238	4th, Pacific	Did not qualify
2025–26	82	34	39	9	77	212	259	7th, Pacific	Did not qualify

== Players and personnel ==
=== Current roster ===
Updated October 30, 2026

No.	Nat	Player	Pos	S/G	Age	Acquired	Birthplace
11	(Sweden)	Mikael Backlund (C)	C	L	37	2007	Västerås, Sweden
7	(Canada)	Kevin Bahl	D	L	26	2024	New Westminster, British Columbia
38	(Canada)	Jonathan Castagna	C	L	21	2026	Etobicoke, Ontario
1	(United States)	Devin Cooley	G	L	29	2024	Los Gatos, California
27	(United States)	Matt Coronato	RW	R	23	2021	Huntington, New York
86	(United States)	Joel Farabee	LW	L	26	2025	Cicero, New York
16	(Canada)	Morgan Frost	C	L	27	2025	Aurora, Ontario
92	(Russia)	Matvei Gridin	RW	L	20	2024	Kurgan, Russia
44	(Canada)	Joel Hanley	D	L	35	2024	Keswick, Ontario
29	(Slovakia)	Samuel Honzek	LW	L	21	2023	Trenčín, Slovakia
10	(Canada)	Jonathan Huberdeau (A)	LW	L	33	2022	Saint-Jerome, Quebec
43	(Czech Republic)	Adam Klapka	RW	R	26	2022	Prague, Czech Republic
37	(Russia)	Yan Kuznetsov	D	L	24	2020	Murmansk, Russia
55	(Canada)	Jake Middleton	D	L	30	2026	Stratford, Ontario
71	(Slovakia)	Šimon Nemec	D	R	22	2026	Liptovský Mikuláš, Slovakia
78	(Canada)	Brennan Othmann	LW	L	23	2026	Scarborough, Ontario
19	(Canada)	Zayne Parekh	D	R	20	2024	Nobleton, Ontario
76	(Slovakia)	Martin Pospíšil	C	L	26	2018	Zvolen, Slovakia
35	(Russia)	Arsenii Sergeev	G	L	23	2021	Yaroslavl, Russia
17	(Belarus)	Yegor Sharangovich	C	L	28	2023	Minsk, Belarus
65	(Sweden)	William Strömgren	LW	L	23	2021	Örnsköldsvik, Sweden
22	(Canada)	Ryan Strome	C	R	33	2026	Mississauga, Ontario
61	(Russia)	Aydar Suniev	LW	L	21	2023	Kazan, Russia
72	(Russia)	Maxim Tsyplakov	RW	L	28	2026	Moscow, Russia
28	(Canada)	Zach Whitecloud (A)	D	R	29	2026	Brandon, Manitoba
32	(United States)	Dustin Wolf	G	L	25	2019	Gilroy, California

=== Team captains ===
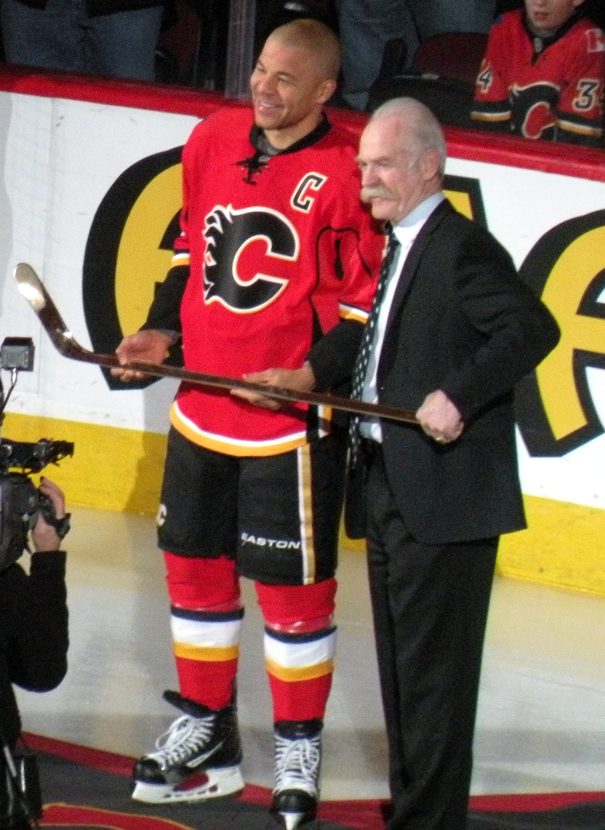
Lanny McDonald presents Iginla with a gold stick. The pair of former captains are the only players to score their 500th career goal in a Flames uniform.

- Brad Marsh, 1980–1982
- Phil Russell, 1981–1983
- Lanny McDonald, 1983–1989
- Jim Peplinski, 1984–1989
- Brad McCrimmon, 1989–1990
- Rotating captains, 1990–1991
- Joe Nieuwendyk, 1991–1995
- Theoren Fleury, 1995–1997
- Todd Simpson, 1997–1999
- Steve Smith, 1999–2000
- Dave Lowry, 2000–2002
- Bob Boughner, 2002
- Craig Conroy, 2002–2003
- Jarome Iginla, 2003–2013
- Mark Giordano, 2013–2021
- Mikael Backlund, 2023–present

McDonald and Risebrough were co-captains in 1983–1984. McDonald and Peplinski were co-captains in 1987–1989. Boughner and Conroy were co-captains for the latter half of the 2001–02 season after Dave Lowry was stripped of the captaincy.

=== Honoured members ===
==== Retired numbers ====
Lanny McDonald, Mike Vernon, Jarome Iginla, and Miika Kiprusoff are the only Flames to have their numbers retired by the team, while Al MacInnis and Joe Nieuwendyk have had their numbers honoured by the team (they are still in circulation) as part of the Flames' "Forever a Flame" program. With the exception of Iginla and Kiprusoff, all of these players were members of the Flames' 1989 Stanley Cup-winning team.

Calgary Flames retired numbers
No.	Player	Position	Career	No. retirement
9	Lanny McDonald	RW	1981–1989	March 17, 1990
12	Jarome Iginla	RW	1996–2013	March 2, 2019
30	Mike Vernon	G	1982–1994; 2000–2002	February 6, 2007
34	Miikka Kiprusoff	G	2003–2013	March 2, 2024

The Calgary Flames have retired four numbers, with a fifth retired league-wide. The Flames retired No. 9 in honour of Lanny McDonald, who played right wing for the Flames from 1981 to 1989 and won the Stanley Cup as the Flames' co-captain in his final year. No. 30 was retired to honour Mike Vernon, goaltender with the Flames from 1982 to 1994 and 2000 to 2002. The Flames retired Jarome Iginla's No. 12 in 2019; he played right wing for the Flames from 1996 to 2013 and served as the team's captain from 2003 to 2013. Miika Kiprusoff's No. 34 was retired in 2024; he was the Flames' goaltender for 11 years from 2003 to 2013. The NHL retired Wayne Gretzky's No. 99 for all its member teams at the 2000 NHL All-Star Game.

In 2012, the Flames organization introduced the "Forever a Flame" programme to honour those who played and represented the Calgary Flames without retiring their numbers. On February 27, 2012, defenceman Al MacInnis earned this distinction, with a banner with his picture and his No. 2 raised to the Scotiabank Saddledome rafters. Joe Nieuwendyk was treated likewise on March 7, 2014, promoted as "Forever 25" for both the number on Nieuwendyk's jersey and the 25th anniversary of the 1989 title.

==== Hockey Hall of Fame members ====
Twelve former Flames have been elected to the Hockey Hall of Fame, six of whom earned their credentials primarily in Calgary. Lanny McDonald was the first Flames player inducted, gaining election in 1992. McDonald recorded 215 goals in 492 games over seven and a half seasons for the Flames, including a team-record 66 goals in 1982–83. He was joined in 2000 by a fellow member of the 1989 Stanley Cup championship team, Joe Mullen. Mullen spent five seasons with the Flames, recording 388 points and receiving two Lady Byng Trophies. Grant Fuhr, elected in 2003, became the third former Flames player to enter the Hall. Fuhr played only one season in Calgary, but recorded his 400th career win in a Flames uniform, a victory over the Florida Panthers on October 22, 1999. In 2007, Al MacInnis became the fourth former Flame inducted into the Hall. MacInnis was a member of the Flames from 1981 until 1994. He won the Conn Smythe Trophy in 1989 as playoff MVP. On November 9, 2009, Brett Hull became the fifth player in Calgary Flames history to be inducted. He was selected 117th in the 1984 NHL entry draft by the Flames, and began his NHL career playing two seasons (1986–1988) with Calgary.

On June 28, 2011, it was announced that former Flames forwards Doug Gilmour and Joe Nieuwendyk would become the sixth and seventh members to enter the Hockey Hall of Fame. On June 29, 2015, defenceman Phil Housley was inducted, making him the eighth player in Flames history to gain that honour. Housley played for the Flames on two separate occasions, (1994–1996 and 1998–2001). Sergei Makarov entered as a part of the Class of 2016. Makarov was chosen 231st in the 1983 NHL entry draft, and joined the Flames in 1989, where he won the Calder Memorial Trophy as rookie of the year at the age of 31. He played for the Flames from 1989 to 1993. Martin St. Louis became the tenth player to be inducted into the Hall. St. Louis was a part of the Flames organization from 1997 to 2000, splitting his time with the Flames' American Hockey League affiliate Saint John Flames and the main roster. On June 24, 2020, Jarome Iginla became the eleventh player inducted into the Hall of Fame. He played for the Flames from 1996 to 2013; during his time with the team he won many awards including the Art Ross Trophy, the Lester B. Pearson Award and the Maurice "Rocket" Richard Trophy. In 2023, Mike Vernon became the twelfth player inducted into the Hall of Fame. Vernon played for the Flames from 1982 to 1994 and from 2000 to 2002.

Former head coach "Badger" Bob Johnson joined McDonald in the class of 1992, gaining election as a builder. Johnson coached five seasons with the Flames from 1982 to 1987, and his 193 wins remain a team record. Cliff Fletcher was the Flames general manager from the organization's inception in 1972 until 1991, a span of 19 years. During that time, the Flames qualified for the playoffs sixteen consecutive times between 1976 and 1991. Fletcher was inducted in 2004. In 2006, Harley Hotchkiss became the third Flames builder to gain election. He was an original member of the ownership group that purchased and brought the Flames to Calgary in 1980. He was the team's longtime governor and the public face of the consortium. He has served many years as the chairman of the NHL board of directors and played a significant role in the resolution of the 2004–05 lock-out. Fellow original owner Doc Seaman was similarly inducted in 2010. On June 29, 2015, former player Bill Hay was elected to the Hockey Hall of Fame in the builders category. Hay served as president and CEO for the Flames in the 1990s.

Flames radio broadcaster Peter Maher was named the recipient of the Foster Hewitt Memorial Award in 2006 for his years of service as the radio play-by-play announcer for the Calgary Flames. Longtime trainer Bearcat Murray was inducted into the Hall of Fame in 2009 by the Professional Hockey Athletic Trainers Society and the Society of Professional Hockey Equipment Managers.

== Franchise leaders ==
=== Scoring leaders ===
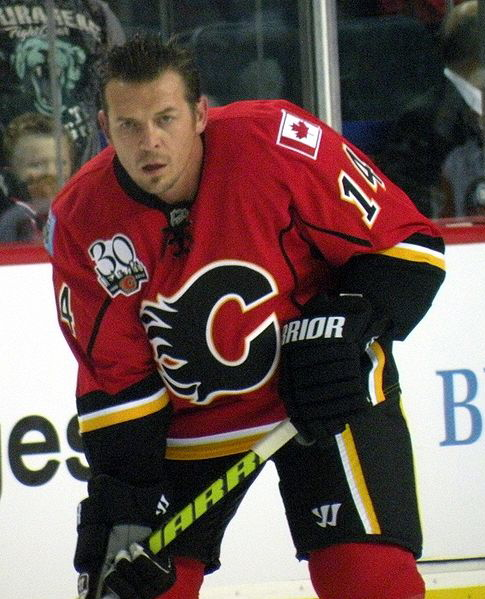
Recording 830 regular season points on the Flames, Theoren Fleury is the all-time second highest point-scorer in the franchise.

These are the top-ten point-scorers in franchise (Atlanta and Calgary) history. Figures are updated after each completed NHL regular season.

- * – current Flames player

Note: Pos = Position; GP = Games played; G = Goals; A = Assists; Pts = Points; P/G = Points per game average

Points
Player	Pos	GP	G	A	Pts	P/G
Jarome Iginla	RW	1,219	525	570	1,095	.90
Theoren Fleury	RW	791	364	466	830	1.05
Al MacInnis	D	803	213	609	822	1.02
Joe Nieuwendyk	C	577	314	302	616	1.07
Johnny Gaudreau	LW	602	210	399	609	1.01
Mikael Backlund*	C	1,148	232	374	606	.53
Gary Suter	D	617	128	436	564	.91
Kent Nilsson	C	425	229	333	562	1.32
Guy Chouinard	C	514	193	336	529	1.03
Mark Giordano	D	949	143	366	509	.54

Goals
Player	Pos	G
Jarome Iginla	RW	525
Theoren Fleury	RW	364
Joe Nieuwendyk	C	314
Gary Roberts	LW	257
Mikael Backlund*	C	232
Kent Nilsson	C	229
Lanny McDonald	RW	215
Al MacInnis	D	213
Sean Monahan	C	212
Johnny Gaudreau	LW	210

Assists
Player	Pos	A
Al MacInnis	D	609
Jarome Iginla	RW	570
Theoren Fleury	RW	466
Gary Suter	D	436
Johnny Gaudreau	LW	399
Mikael Backlund*	C	374
Mark Giordano	D	366
Guy Chouinard	C	336
Paul Reinhart	D	336
Kent Nilsson	C	333

=== Goaltending leaders ===
These are the top-ten goaltenders in franchise (Atlanta and Calgary) history by wins. Figures are updated after each completed NHL regular season.

- * – current Flames player

Note: GP = Games played; W = Wins; L = Losses; T/O = Ties/Overtime losses; GA = Goal against; GAA = Goals against average; SA = Shots against; SV% = Save percentage; SO = Shutouts

Goaltenders
Player	GP	W	L	T/O	GA	GAA	SA	SV%	SO
Miikka Kiprusoff	576	305	192	68	1,387	2.46	16,018	.913	41
Mike Vernon	527	262	188	57	1,617	3.27	13,802	.883	13
Dan Bouchard	398	168	139	75	1,154	3.04	11,400	.899	20
Réjean Lemelin	323	144	99	46	1,078	3.67	9,303	.884	6
Jacob Markström	213	105	78	25	545	2.63	5,836	.907	15
Phil Myre	211	76	95	32	653	3.21	6,097	.893	11
Trevor Kidd	178	72	66	26	460	2.83	4,524	.898	10
David Rittich	130	63	39	15	333	2.83	3,602	.908	4
Roman Turek	152	63	68	20	376	2.53	3,981	.906	12
Dustin Wolf*	128	60	52	12	349	2.85	3,598	.903	5

== See also ==
- Ice hockey in Calgary
- List of ice hockey teams in Alberta
- List of Calgary Flames broadcasters

Preceded by Edmonton Oilers	Stanley Cup champions 1988–89	Succeeded by Edmonton Oilers
