= Battle of Alberta (NHL) =

National Hockey League rivalry

The Battle of Alberta
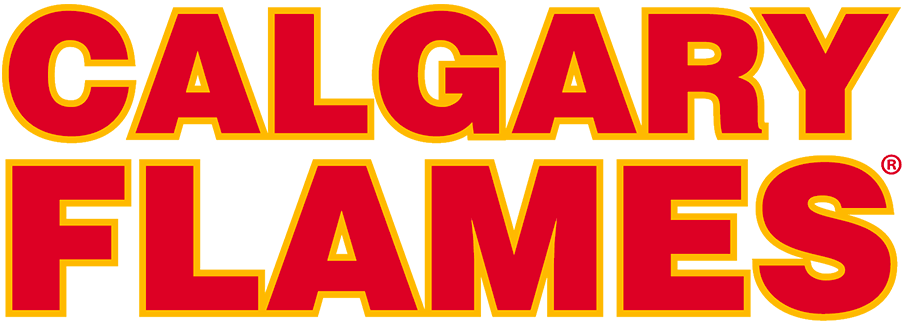
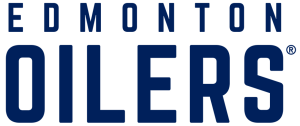
- Calgary Flames Edmonton Oilers
- First meeting: October 22, 1980 (Note: This does not include the Flames' 2–1–1–0 record against Edmonton as the Atlanta Flames.)
- Latest meeting: October 28, 2026
- Next meeting: March 3, 2027

Statistics
- Total meetings: 305
- All-time series: 146–135–18–7 (CGY)
- Regular season series: 134–112–18–7 (CGY)
- Postseason results: 23–12 (EDM)
- Largest victory: EDM 10–1 CGY; November 26, 1996
- Longest win streak: CGY W9
- Current win streak: EDM W1

Postseason history
- 1983 division finals: Oilers won, 4–1; 1984 division finals: Oilers won, 4–3; 1986 division finals: Flames won, 4–3; 1988 division finals: Oilers won, 4–0; 1991 division semifinals: Oilers won, 4–3; 2022 second round: Oilers won, 4–1

The Battle of Alberta is a National Hockey League (NHL) rivalry between the Calgary Flames and Edmonton Oilers. The rivalry is one of the fiercest regional rivalries in league history. Geography plays a heavy role in the matchup as both teams are located on opposite sides of the Canadian province of Alberta. The two teams are based in the cities of Edmonton, the provincial capital, and Calgary, the province's most populous city. Both teams have met in the postseason six times and have combined for six Stanley Cup titles. The Flames lead the regular season series with a 134–111–18–7, while the Oilers lead the postseason matchups 23–12.

== History ==
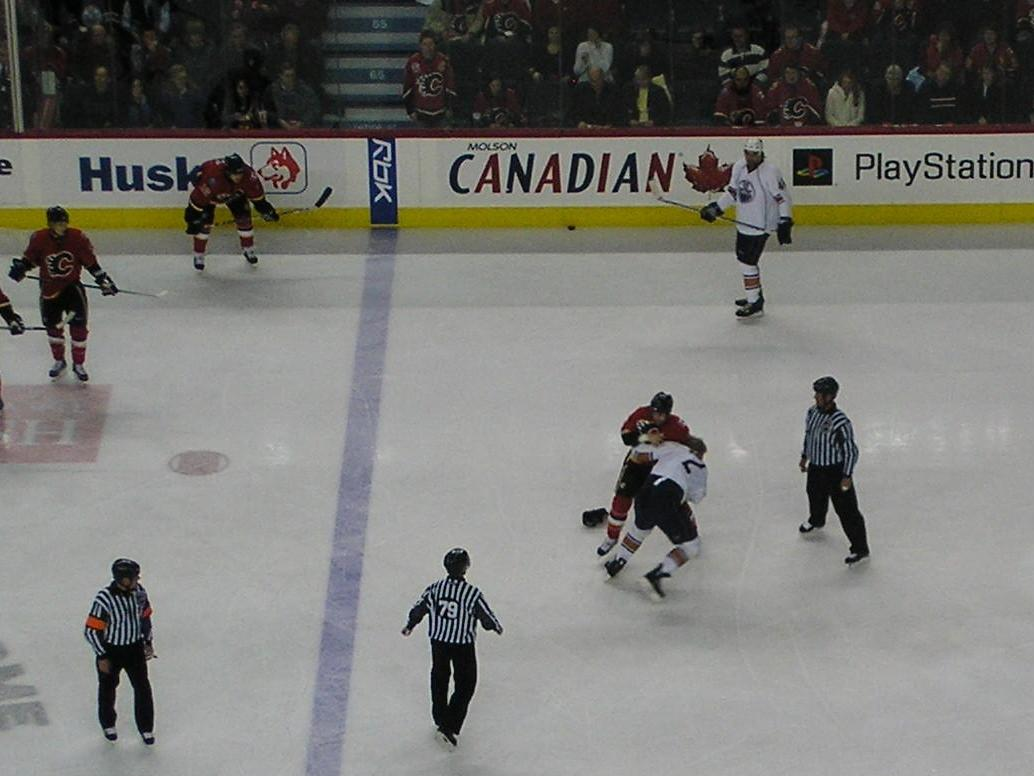
A fight between Eric Godard of the Calgary Flames and Matt Greene of the Edmonton Oilers during a game in 2008

=== Origins ===
The Oilers were established as a World Hockey Association (WHA) team in 1972 and joined the NHL as a part of the NHL–WHA merger in 1979. They were soon followed by the Atlanta Flames moving to Calgary in 1980, making the question of who would reign as the top team in Alberta a hot topic. The Flames were the higher-ranked squad in their inaugural season, finishing with 39 wins and 92 points and making it to the Stanley Cup semifinals. The following year the Oilers became the dominant franchise when the Oilers shot to the top of the Smythe Division and Wayne Gretzky started his career-long process of shattering over 100 NHL records and milestones.

=== 1980s ===
The rivalry was especially bitter in the second half of the 1980s. For much of this time, the Flames and Oilers were the two best teams in the Campbell Conference, and by some accounts in the entire league. One of the two teams represented the Campbell Conference in the Stanley Cup Final for eight consecutive years from 1983 to 1990 (Oilers six times, Flames twice). During this time, the Alberta teams won six of the eight Stanley Cup Championships, including the Oilers winning five Cups, a feat that has not been repeated since. The Edmonton Oilers of 1983–90 are recognized as one of the NHL's last great dynasties, with line-ups through this period that featured Hockey Hall of Fame (HHOF) legends like Gretzky, Glenn Anderson, Paul Coffey, Grant Fuhr, Kevin Lowe, Jari Kurri and Mark Messier, guided by HHOF coach Glen Sather. The 1984–85 Oilers would be voted as the greatest NHL team of all-time during the league's 2017 centennial celebrations. The only time the Flames won the Stanley Cup during that period was in 1989, led by HHOF superstars Lanny McDonald, Doug Gilmour, Al MacInnis, Joe Mullen and Joe Nieuwendyk. This period of repeated confrontations was mainly due to the way the playoffs were structured for much of this time. The top four teams in each division made the playoffs, and the winners of the divisional rounds met in the conference finals. As the Flames and Oilers were both in the Smythe Division, this made it very likely they would face each other in the first or second round, en route to the conference finals. That same system made it a near-certainty that all other playoff qualifiers in the Campbell Conference faced the nearly unachievable (during that eight-year period) task of having to get past either the Oilers or Flames (or both) to make the Stanley Cup Final. During this run, the Stanley Cup was awarded in Alberta from 1984 to 1988 (Oilers winning the deciding Cup game against the Prince of Wales Conference champion in Edmonton in 1984, 1985, 1987, and 1988, while the east's Montreal Canadiens won the deciding game in Calgary in 1986).

The Oilers defeated the Flames in the playoffs in 1983, 1984, 1988, and 1991, on their way to two of their five Stanley Cups. The Flames defeated the Oilers in the 1986 NHL playoffs; game seven was decided when rookie Oiler defenceman Steve Smith accidentally scored on his own goal, which pushed the rivalry to a new level. The Flames were favoured in the 1988 playoffs, winning the Presidents' Trophy, but the Oilers swept the series and eventually went on to win the Cup.

=== 1990s ===
After their opening round matchup in 1991, the two teams did not meet again in the playoffs until 2022. The Oilers, the 1990 Stanley Cup champions, had finished 20 points behind the Flames, the 1989 Stanley Cup champions. Despite this, the Oilers were able to push the series to seven games, with Esa Tikkanen leading the underdog Oilers to an overtime victory on his third goal of the game.

Due to the sheer talent and skill exhibited by both teams in the mid to late-1980s, Alberta was considered a "Death Valley" for teams coming to play on a road trip. The honing of skills developed by the Oilers and Flames by playing the "other" best team in the NHL this many times a year made a swing through Alberta quite daunting for the rest of the teams in the league. The two Alberta teams showed their collective domination over the other 19 teams in the NHL by finishing a joint first and second in the Smythe Division six times between the 1982–83 and 1989–90 regular seasons (neither team lower than third in the nine seasons from 1981 to 1982 through 1990–91), finishing a joint first and second in the larger Clarence Campbell Conference four times between the 1985–86 and 1989–90 regular seasons (neither team lower than fifth from 1981 to 1982 through 1990–91) and finishing with both teams in the top ten of the entire NHL seven times between the 1983–84 and 1989–90 regular seasons (with both teams in the top five of the entire NHL in four of those seasons). At least one of the two Alberta teams finished first or second overall for the entire NHL in every one of those nine seasons.

With the changes to the regular season schedule from the 1991–92 NHL season onwards, the two teams no longer played each other eight times a year. Falling to only four times a year by 2016–17, except for the 2020–21 NHL season where they played ten times due to play exclusively against Canadian NHL teams due to the COVID-19 pandemic. Changes in the playoff format also reduced the opportunities for the two teams to meet in the intensity of a condensed seven-game series in less than two weeks – as they went 31 years between playoff meetings after the 1991 series. As the NHL expanded in the United States, Canada declined from seven of 21 league teams in 1990–91 to six of 30 by the 2000–01 NHL season. The two Alberta franchises faced financial hardships, since they were among the smallest markets in the league, restricting their ability to pay for higher quality talent and further reducing the competitiveness of the Battle of Alberta games and their ability to reach the playoffs. The situation was not addressed until June 2005, when the NHL became the last major North American professional sports league to introduce a salary cap, coupled with improved revenue sharing.

=== 2000s ===
It took well over a decade for either team to return to anything near the form they had exhibited in the 1980s. The Flames advanced to the 2004 Stanley Cup Final, falling in seven games to the Tampa Bay Lightning. The Flames became the first team in the modern era of the NHL to defeat all three division winners en route to the Stanley Cup Final. The next Stanley Cup Final, played in 2006 due to the NHL lock-out of 2004–05, saw the Edmonton Oilers fall in seven games to the Carolina Hurricanes. The Oilers became the first eighth seed in NHL history to advance past the semifinals, let alone make it to the Stanley Cup Final. The Oilers faced a playoff drought for ten seasons after their run in 2006–07, not qualifying for the playoffs until the 2016–17 season. The Flames made the playoffs every year until 2009, but then had their own playoff drought of six consecutive seasons.

There have been three regular season sweeps in the history of the rivalry. The Flames swept the six-game series in 2009–10 and the five-game series in 2014–15, while the Oilers swept the four-game series in 2016–17. The Flames’ sweep of the Oilers in 2009–10 was significant in the sense that they tied the rivalry's win–loss–tie overall regular season and playoff series (since the team's move to Calgary) on December 28, 2009. They then took the overall series lead with their victory over the Oilers three days later, and they have not relinquished it since (as of the end of the 2019–20 season). The Oilers had previously led the series since October 20, 1981. The aforementioned 2009–10 season also marked the first-ever trade between the two rivals, with Edmonton's Steve Staios being traded for Calgary's Aaron Johnson on March 3, 2010.

=== 2020s ===
The rivalry saw a large revival in early 2020s. During a game on January 11, 2020, Calgary's Matthew Tkachuk and Edmonton's Zack Kassian began a feud. It began with two hits that Kassian felt were "predatory" in nature from Tkachuk, including a hit that knocked off Kassian's helmet. In response, Kassian attempted to fight Tkachuk, grabbing and punching him. Tkachuk did not fight back and assumed a defensive position, leading Kassian to be given a double-minor penalty for roughing and a misconduct. On the ensuing power play, Calgary scored the game-winning goal. After the game, Tkachuk's decision to "turtle" stirred controversy among players, fans, and sports writers. The teams met again on January 29, which saw Tkachuk and Kassian fight near the end of the first period, with Kassian saying “Thanks kid, I appreciate you doing this." In the next game on February 1, the first goalie fight between the two teams erupted, in the midst of a full line brawl. It was considered by many fans as the epitome of the battle of Alberta, with Oilers radio announcer Jack Michaels saying, "This is the battle of Alberta we've been waiting for, for three decades!" during his coverage of the game.

During the 2022 playoffs, the Edmonton Oilers and Calgary Flames faced off in the second round. Both the Flames and Oilers narrowly won their previous rounds, both of which went to game seven. Game one set the tone for the rest of the series with a record-setting high-scoring game, which ended in a Flames 9–6 victory. The Oilers then won the next four games, with players such as the Oilers' Evander Kane scoring multiple goals, along with a hat-trick. In game five, both teams scored in total four goals in 71 seconds, bringing the score to 4–4 at the end of the second period. In the third period, a controversial goal by Flames player Blake Coleman was called off for being knocked in with a kicking motion, resulting in the game remaining tied. The game went to overtime where Oilers' star player, Connor McDavid, scored from a quick snapshot five minutes in. The Oilers advanced to the Western Conference finals for the first time since 2006, but they were swept by the Colorado Avalanche.

The two teams met at the 2023 Heritage Classic in Edmonton on October 29, 2023, with the Oilers defeating the Flames 5–2.
