= Jay and Jules Allen =

Jay Allen (1890–1942) and Jules Allen (1888–1964) were pioneering film exhibitors in Canada. They were born in Bradford, Pennsylvania.

== Early life ==
Jay and Jules Allen were born in 1890 and 1888 to Bernard and Goldie Allen, Russian Jews who immigrated to Bradford, Pennsylvania in the 1880s, respectively. Jule moved to Charleston, West Virginia at age seventeen and worked as a shoe salesman while Jay moved to Rochester, New York, where he worked as a clothing salesman. They became managers of general stores for a company operating in West Virginia mining communities. Jay married Rae Abrahamson and Jule married Sara Rosenfeld.

== Career ==
=== Allen Theatres ===
The brothers became film exhibitors in September 1906. Their father gave them the money needed to open a theatre in Hamilton, Ontario, which had no theatres yet, but instead they opened their theatre in Brantford as they had to wait thirty days to rent in Hamilton. Their theatre, Theatorium, opened on 10 November 1906, with 2,000 in attendance. They also expanded into other cities. An explosion destroyed the Theatorium in September 1908, resulting in its replacement by the Gem. They sold their business in 1909. However, they returned and organized the Canadian Film Exchange. They held the distribution rights for Biograph Company, Pathé, Independent Moving Pictures, and Universal Pictures. Bernard served as the president, Jay as the vice-president, and Jule as the secretary-treasurer.

The seat total of the brothers' theatres amounted to 5,232 by 1913. They formed the Monarch Theatre Company of Moose Jaw with $40,000 in stock at $10 a share and the Monarch was constructed from 1913 to 1916. They spent $200,000 to acquire property for the Allen Theatre and $125,000 to construct it by 1913. The Allen Theatre Company was formed with $50,000 in stock at $10 a share.

The Allen brothers changed their business' name to Famous Players Film Service. They gained the distribution rights for Paramount Pictures in 1914. They sold their rights to Universal Pictures film distribution to Carl Laemmle under the belief that Adolph Zukor would give them a better offer. The Canadian Paramount Pictures Corporation Limited was organized by the Allen family on 4 December 1915, in order to combine their nine theatres and film exchange. Following World War I they founded British Films Limited to import films from the United Kingdom.

C. Howard Crane was hired to design their theatres in response to Nathan Nathanson using Thomas W. Lamb to design his theatres. The brothers spent $1 million to buy John Schuberg's theatre chain and the rights to distribute First National Pictures. They had the largest theatre chain in Canada by 1920, with sixty theatres worth $25 million (equivalent to $344,517,544 in 2023). They expanded internationally with the construction of a theatre in Cleveland, Ohio, purchased Empire, Leicester Square, and planned to expand into the Soviet Union.

The brothers gain the distribution rights to Goldwyn Pictures in December 1918. Their contract with Paramount ended in September 1919, and Zukor gave the rights to Nathanson instead. They were unable to pay the mortgage for their theatre in Calgary and it was foreclosed in October 1924.

Max Aitken, 1st Baron Beaverbrook offered the Allen brothers $15 million for 50% of their holdings, but Jule rejected the offer after the largest Allen Theatre Enterprises investors told him to. Aitken instead gave his financial backing to Nathanson. Jay invested a large amount of money into the German mark as he believed that it would rebound.

Nathanson attempted to purchase the Allen's theatre chain for $4-5 million in 1921, but Jay refused. According to Jack Bickell the Allen brothers had $951,618 in assets and $687,293 in liabilities in 1922. Creditors attempted to have them declared bankrupt and formed a company to negotiate a sale with Famous Players, but the committee decided that the Allen Theatres would be able to repay its debts and rejected Nathanson's $1.05 million offer. However, G.T. Clarkson decaled that Allen Theatres was bankrupt, with $1.25 million in debts and 36 theatres, and it was sold to Famous Players for $650,000.

Allen's Danforth Theatre in Toronto managed to survive as an independent cinema, and it is now a music venue known as the Danforth Music Hall. Allen's Bloor Theatre in Toronto is currently a concert hall known as Lee's Palace.

=== Other ventures ===
Louis Rosenfeld formed Dominion Films and the Allen brothers gained the distribution rights for Columbia Pictures movies in 1926. They formed Columbia Pictures of Canada, which Dominion Films and Independent Films of Canada merged into, and was managed by Rosenfeld. Jay and his brother Herbert formed the Premier Operating Corporation in January 1928, and acquired multiple theatres. They formed a fifty-fifty partnership with Nathanson and created Theatre Holding Corporation as an umbrella organization with Famous Players.

Following the bankruptcy of the Allen Theatres chain, the brothers returned to film exhibition with the Ontario-based Premier Theatres, which is now a chain of drive-in cinemas.

== Later life ==
Jay died on 17 October 1942, in Toronto, and Jules died on 15 January 1964, in Miami, Florida.

== Works cited ==
- Seiler, Robert (2013). Reel Time: Movie Exhibitors and Movie Audiences In Prairie Canada, 1896 to 1986. Athabasca University Press. ISBN 9781926836997.
