= FLR =

FLR may refer to:

- FLR, old IATA code for Fall River Municipal Airport, a defunct airport in Massachusetts, United States
- FLR, IATA code for Florence Airport, in Italy
- FLR, NYSE ticker symbol for Fluor Corporation, an American engineering and construction firm
- flr, ISO 639-3 code for the Fuliiru language, spoken in Congo
- Family Law Reports, a law report series for family law cases in the United Kingdom
- Family Life Radio, an American radio network
- Faiyum Light Railway, a former Egyptian railway
- Federal Law Reports, a series of Australian law reports
- Female-led relationship, a type of interpersonal relationship
- Fife Lake Railway, in Canada
- First Line Reserve, a part of the Irish Reserve Defence Forces
- Forest landscape restoration, forest restoration intended to restore landscape appearance as well as ecology
- Formosan League for Reemancipation, an organization supportive of the Taiwan independence movement after World War II
- Front des Lesbiennes Radicales, a French-based radical lesbianism movement
- Functional linear regression, an example of the generalized functional linear model
- Funen Life Regiment, a former Danish military unit
- Fuzzy Logic Recordings, a Canadian record label
- Fédération Luxembourgeoise de rugby (Luxembourg Rugby Federation), Luxembourgeoise sports organization
- Ken Ishii (born 1970), a Japanese DJ and record producer with multiple pseudonyms including FLR
