= The Good, the Bad and the Cuddly =

The Good, The Bad And The Cuddly

Studio album by The Bicycles
- Released: May 30, 2006
- Genre: Indie pop
- Length: 38:47
- Label: Fuzzy Logic Recordings
- Producer: Dan Bryk

The Bicycles chronology
As Is (1999–2000)	The Good, The Bad And The Cuddly (2006)	Oh No, It's Love (2008)

Professional ratings
Review scores
Source	Rating
Allmusic	link

The Good, The Bad And The Cuddly is the debut album by Canadian pop band The Bicycles. Randy Lee left the band following the release to join The Hylozoists.

Despite playing together as a band for nearly five years, the band's debut wasn't released until spring 2006. The album was partially produced by Dan Bryk and partially by The Bicycles themselves. The album was mixed by José Miguel Contreras of By Divine Right.

"Cuddly Toy" is a cover of a Harry Nilsson-penned song originally recorded by The Monkees. "The Defeat" was inspired a song entitled "The Victory" by The Meligrove Band.

Music videos were shot for "Paris Be Mine", "Gotta Get Out", and "Homework".

== Track listing ==
All songs written by Matt Beckett, except where noted.

1. "B-B-Bicycles" – 2:07
  - Lead vocals: Matt Beckett & Drew Smith
2. "Australia" – 3:02
  - Lead vocals: Beckett
3. "I Will Appear for You" – 3:10
  - Lead vocals: Beckett & Smith
4. "Gotta Get Out" (Smith) – 2:01
  - Lead vocals: Smith
5. "I Know We Have to Be Apart" (Smith) – 2:42
  - Lead vocals: Dana Snell
6. "Ghost Town" (Smith) – 3:52
  - Lead vocals: Smith
7. "Longjohns and Toques" – 1:47
  - Lead vocals: Beckett
8. "The Defeat" (Beckett, Smith, Snell, Andrew Scott, Randy Lee) – 1:25
9. "Luck of Love" – 2:07
  - Lead vocals: Scott
10. "Paris Be Mine" – 1:49
  - Lead vocals: Beckett
11. "Cuddly Toy" (Harry Nilsson) – 2:45
  - Lead vocals: Beckett
12. "Randy's Song" (Smith) – 1:32
  - Lead vocals: Lee
13. "Please Don't Go" – 2:09
  - Lead vocals: Beckett
14. "Sure Was Great" (Smith, Scott) – 1:35
  - Lead vocals: Smith
15. "Homework" – 3:36
  - Lead vocals: Beckett
16. "Pomp and Circumstance" (Beckett, Smith, Snell, Scott, Lee) – 0:08
17. "Two Girls from Montreal" (Beckett, Smith) – 2:58
  - Lead vocals: Beckett

== Personnel ==
The Bicycles are:

- Matt Beckett
- Drew Smith
- Dana Snell
- Randy Lee
- Andrew Scott
