= More or Les =

More Or Les
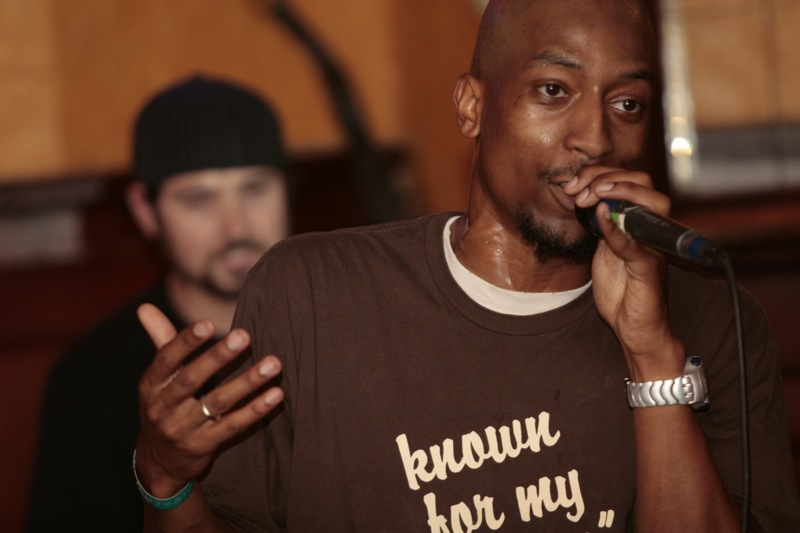
- More Or Les at Pop Montreal, 2007

Background information
- Born: Leslie Seaforth; Toronto, Ontario, Canada
- Genres: Canadian hip hop, Rap
- Occupations: Rapper, DJ, producer
- Instruments: Vocals, Turntables
- Labels: Fuzzy Logic Recordings, Villain Idol Productions, Hand’Solo Records
- Website: http://moreorles.ca/

Leslie Seaforth, better known by his stage name More Or Les, is a Canadian rapper, DJ and producer. He is a member of the Canadian hip hop collective Backburner. He currently resides in his hometown of Toronto, Ontario.

== Career ==
More Or Les' interest in hip hop culture began as a DJ, learning to mix at the age of 11 with the help of his older brother Colin. As a first year student at Woburn Collegiate Institute in Scarborough, Ontario, Les began freestyling with other local emcees and performing regularly at school assemblies. It was around this time that Les created the emcee name for himself, and started to produce beats.

In 2001, More Or Les became one of the resident DJs at Toronto's longest running open mic night known as In Divine Style. It was at this event where Les met and began working on music with several members of the Toronto hip-hop community including Dorc, Vangel and the Wordburglar. These connections led to the release of his first album I only stop for the Red Ants in 2003. Les used the revenue generated from this version to release a "shrinkwrap edition" in 2004, a version with remastered tracks including a bonus song and a music video for the song A Little Too Much Weed. While deemed "too controversial" for airplay on MuchMusic, the video has been shown on the Bravo program Richler Ink and received an award from the Next Festival in 2004, honouring the year's most innovative international videos. To further promote the album, Les not only performed at "regular" music venues, but also began busking on downtown Toronto streets, becoming a mainstay on Queen West on weekends for several years.

In 2005, More Or Les met and performed with UK Hip Hop band The Herbaliser. This meeting has led to subsequent touring in Canada and Europe with the band, and recorded appearances on their album Same As It Never Was, released in 2008.

More Or Les has since released a second album The Truth About Rap in 2006, featuring several artists he has since been affiliated with, including the Wordburglar and Rhythmicru. This album has also been well received by critics, cited as one of the Top 10 Hip Hop releases of 2006 by Exclaim!, with songs receiving regular airplay on CBC Radio 3.

In late summer 2009, More Or Les collaborated with Backburner crew producer Fresh Kils and DJ Uncle Fester to release The Les Kils EP. Meeting rave reviews from press, the EP debuted on Canadian college radio at #1. The song Pop N Chips has been played in high rotation on CBC Radio 3, with a music video for the release that has received play on Canadian channels MuchMusic and MusiquePlus.

In the latter half of October 2010, More Or Les released his third full-length release Brunch with a Vengeance on Fuzzy Logic Recordings. Featuring a number of local artists and an additional collaboration with The Herbaliser, Les' new project is a concept album, compiling a list of various complaints from fans, friends and family and turning them into songs. In addition to the latest project, More Or Les continues to be a co-host of Hip Hop Karaoke in Toronto (with DJs Dalia, Numeric, Ted Dancin' and co-host Abdominal), an event started in 2006.

In 2020, he and Peter Chapman received a Canadian Screen Award nomination for Best Original Song for "We Run the World", from the film Riot Girls.

== Discography ==
=== Albums ===
- I Only Stop for the Red Ants - Early Edition (2003)
- I Only Stop for the Red Ants - Shrinkwrap Edition (2004)
- The Truth About Rap (2006)
- Brunch With A Vengeance (2010)
- Mastication (2012)
- Fill at Will (2014)
- Blow the Fuck Up But Stay Humble (2016)
- Nerd Love (2018)
- The Human Condition (2020)

=== EPs ===
- The Les-Kils EP (2009)
- Post Millenium Tension (2015)

=== Mixtapes ===
- Bigger On The Inside (2013)

=== Guest appearances ===
- 2019 - "Fuckouttahere" (also featuring The Legend Adam Bomb, Prince Po, Fraction, Roshin & Skizza), The Mighty Rhino, album: A Joy Which Nothing Can Erase
- 2018 - "Basically Jesus" (also featuring Jesse Dangerously, Joseph & Cam James), The Mighty Rhino, album: We Will No Longer Retreat Into Darkness
- 2014 - "Leftorium" (also featuring Wordburglar & The Mighty Rhino), Chokeules, album: Stay Up
- 2013 - "Half Truths", M-Kaps, album: Another Day, Another Sudoku
- 2012 - "Go Figure", Dual Core, album: All the things
- 2012 - "Creature Feature", Swamp Thing, album: Creature Feature
- 2012 - "First Contact", Swamp Thing, album: Creature Feature
- 2012 - "Rhyme O'Clock", Wordburglar, album: 3rdburglar
- 2011 - "Whaddup Witcha", The Mighty Rhino (also featuring Rittz), album: He Whom The Beat Sets Free Is Free Indeed
- 2011 - "Round Table", Toolshed feat. Wordburglar and Savilion, album: The Lost
- 2010 - "Rock Majorly", MisterE, album: Dusting for Prints
- 2010 - "Smell The Glove", Timbuktu feat. Muneshine, D-Sisive, Chokeules, Psybo, King Jus, Wordburglar, Apt, Modulok and Elete, album: Stranger Danger
- 2009 - "Unorthadox", Peter Project, album: Fresh EP
- 2008 - "Game, Set, Match", The Herbaliser, album: Same As It Never Was
- 2008 - "Words", The Herbaliser featuring Jessica Darling, album: Same As It Never Was (Japanese release and bonus track on iTunes only)
- 2008 - "Repetitive Stress Injury", Peter Project, album: Peter Project
- 2008 - "Get Up Remix", Rhythmicru feat. Shad, album: D-Ray's Supertoke Mixtape vol. 3
- 2008 (as DJ only) - "John Deere Out Here", Rhythmicru feat. Spesh K, Timbuktu, Wordburglar, album: D-Ray's Supertoke Mixtape vol. 3
- 2008 - "Keep It Moving", Rhythmicru feat. Wordburglar, album: D-Ray's Supertoke Mixtape vol. 3
- 2008 - "We Have Come For Your Children", Rhythmicru feat. Ghetto Socks, Wordburglar, Odario and Uncle Dropsi, album: D-Ray's Supertoke Mixtape vol. 3
- 2007 - "Safe No More", Jesse Dangerously feat. Wordburglar and Apt, album: Verba Volant
- 2007 - "Carnies", Rhythmicru feat. Wordburglar, album: D-Ray's Supertoke Mixtape vol. 2
- 2007 "Turn It Up", Rhythmicru, album: D-Ray's Supertoke Mixtape vol. 2
- 2006 (as DJ only) - "Laymen's Terms", Wordburglar, album: Burglaritis
- 2006 - "Spit Fresh", Wordburglar, album: Burglaritis (also appeared as DJ)
- 2006 (as DJ only) - "The Route" Wordburglar, album: Burglaritis
- 2006 - "Time Flies", Rhythmicru, album: D-Ray's Supertoke Mixtape vol. 1
- 2005 - "Three", Dragon Fli Empire feat. N'didi Cascade, album: Invasion
- 2005 - "Time and Space Remix", Green TaRA feat. N'didi Cascade, Deanna, Chi Turner, album: Music for a Mixed Nation (vinyl only)
- 2004 - "Beautiful Mutant", Mindbender feat. 4th Pyramid, Chuggo, Vangel, Fritz Da Cat, Ill Seer, Eternia, album: Beautiful Mutant (disc two)

== Film, TV and other appearances ==
=== Film ===
- 2007 - song "Emission Admission" featured in Animated Short Emission Admission by Sarah Lazarovic
- 2007 - songs "Maundoe Flute" and "Maundoe Fun" featured in Animated Documentary Mondo Condo by Sarah Lazarovic

=== Television ===
- 2004 - "MuchEminem" - in-studio freestyle battle on MuchMusic
- 2004 - "Urban Groove" - in-studio performance on bpm:TV
- 2004 - "Richler Ink" - featured music video "A Little Too Much Weed" on an episode on Bravo

=== Video games ===
- 2010 - vocals featured on the soundtrack for ModNation Racers - Kart racing game available on Sony PlayStation 3

=== Music video ===
- 2009 - "Pop N Chips" - feat. Ghettosocks and Timbuktu from the More Or Les and Fresh Kils release Les Kils EP - directed by Darrell Faria, produced by Mike MacMillan for Lithium Studios
- 2009 - "We Have Come for Your Children" - by Rhythmicru feat. Ghettosocks, Wordburglar, More Or Les, Odario Williams, and Uncle Dropsi - directed by Arv Slabosevicius for Ghostmilk Studios
- 2008 - "Oscillate!" (as "Shoxxx" from the short film series Hot Snack Radio) - directed and co-written by Matt Eastman, music by Fresh Kils
- 2004 - "A Little Too Much Weed" - directed by Matt Eastman, produced by Sandy Hunter for Soft Citizen

=== Literary ===
- 2012 - "On record: More or Les on Cash Crop by Rascalz" - article for CBC Music
- 2008 - "Get creative for cash: rap edition" - article in the Toronto Star
- 2006 - "E = emcees2" co-written with Jill Murray for The State of the Arts: Living With Culture in Toronto (published by Coach House Press)
