= The Bicycles =

Canadian indie pop band

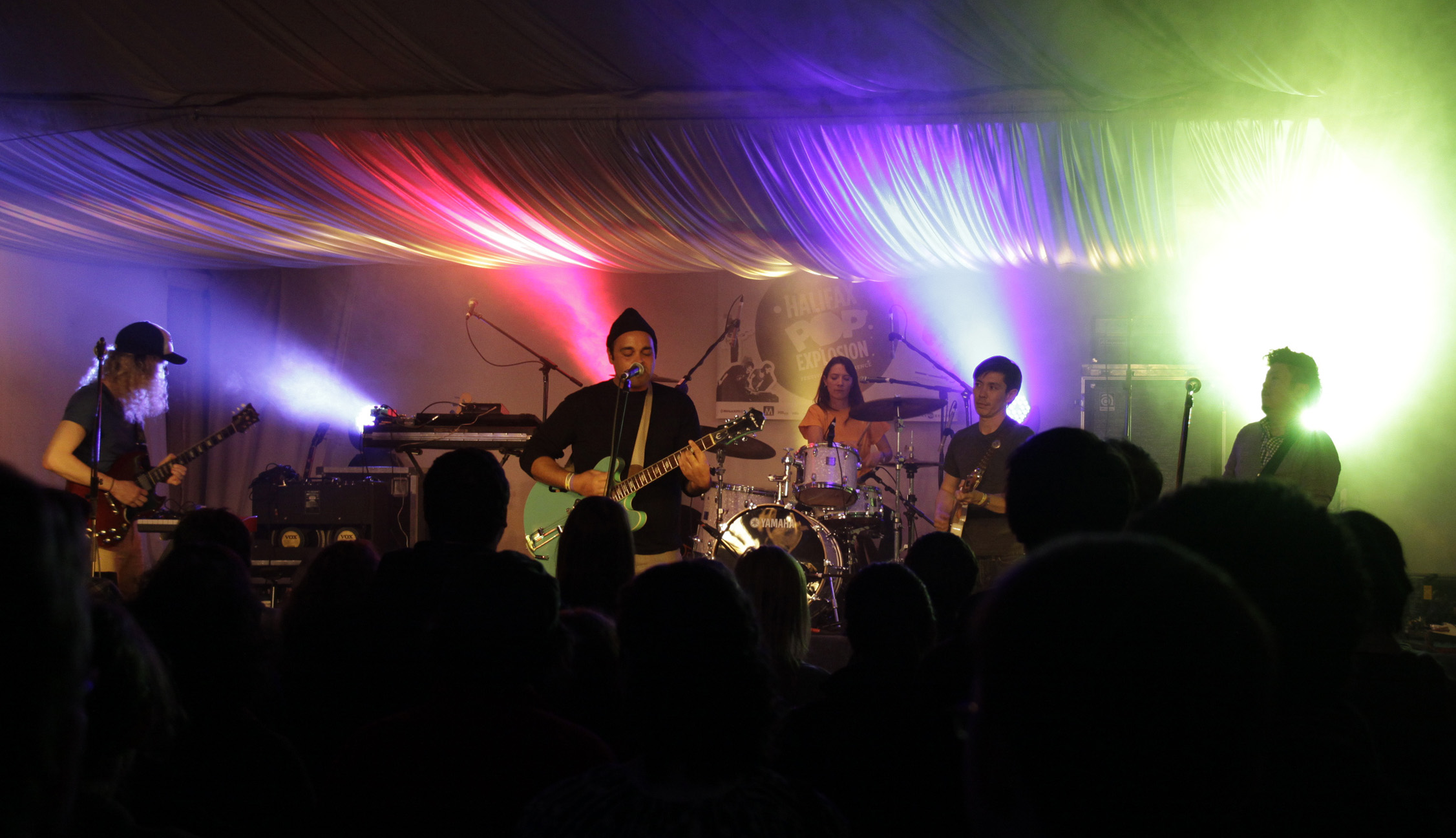
- The Bicycles performing in Halifax at Halifax Pop Explosion, October 19, 2012.

Background information
- Origin: Toronto, Ontario, Canada
- Genres: Indie pop, twee pop
- Years active: 2001-present
- Label: Fuzzy Logic
- Members: Matt Beckett; Andrew Scott; Drew Smith; Dana Snell
- Past members: Randy Lee
- Website: www.thebicycles.ca (defunct)

The Bicycles are a Canadian indie pop quartet originally from Brantford, Ontario composed of Matt Beckett, Drew Smith, Dana Snell, and Andrew Scott (formerly of the Meligrove Band).

== History ==
Beckett, Smith and Lee grew up together Brantford, Ontario and started writing songs in their teens. They moved to Toronto and recorded the acoustic EP As Is in 2000 before recruiting Scott and Snell to create a five-piece band.

In 2006, they released The Good, the Bad and the Cuddly with Fuzzy Logic Recordings. Recorded with Dan Bryk, Robert Sledge and José Miguel Contreras, the album features complex, lush arrangements with a lo-fi sound. The band supported the album with a tour of Canada and the United States, including a supporting slot with The Boy Least Likely To in 2006. In 2007, they released an interactive board game based upon the album.

2008 saw Lee leave to play violin with the Hylozoists. The now four-piece band rejoined Contreras to record and release their second album, the 38-minute, 19-track Oh No, It's Love. Featuring songwriting and lead vocals by all four members, the album spent six weeks at No. 1 on the Canadian campus radio chart.

Spin magazine noted The Bicycles in their February 2008 issue in their City Guide to Toronto, claiming "If Wes Anderson ever cottoned on to (The Bicycles) swooning chamber pop, which draws from the Kinks and the Beach Boys, he'd soak his scarf with tears of joy."

In March 2009, the band announced an indefinite hiatus. Snell joined Reg Vermue, Scott went to Sebastien Grainger and The Mountains, Smith recorded a solo album under the name 'Dr Ew'.

After playing a few unannounced shows in early 2012, The Bicycles re-formed with the full original line-up and played a new material to favorable reviews. The band released the album, Stop Thinking So Much in April 2013.

As of 2017, Scott was playing with the band Biblical; Smith with the band Bunny. According to its Facebook page, The Bicycles' most recent concert was at Toronto's Lee's Palace in November 2017.

== Discography ==
- 2000: As Is
- 2006: The Good, the Bad and the Cuddly
- 2008: Oh No, It's Love
- 2013: Stop Thinking So Much

== Videography ==
- 2007: The Good, the Bad and the Cuddly: The Interactive DVD Board Game

== See also ==
- Canadian rock
- List of bands from Canada
