= Secret Swing =

Coordinates: 43.64837°N 79.39736°W

- Year: 2004
- Medium: Sculpture
- Location: Toronto, Ontario, Canada

Secret Swing from the alley

Swingsite was an art installation that consisted of a playground swing hanging in the narrow space between two buildings in Toronto, Ontario, Canada. The swing was accessed by way of the alley behind Queen Street West, which is known as one of Toronto's best graffiti galleries. Toronto artist Corwyn Lund erected the swing in September 2003 as part of a group show called 'Psychotopes' at YYZ Artists Outlet. As part of that show, Lund made and displayed a video about the installation.

Nicknamed the Secret Swing, its location became more widely known when Toronto bloggers began posting pictures of it online and a number of articles appeared in local newspapers. It has since become a cult icon among street artists and the youth of Toronto. It was located in the alley behind the store fronts on the south side of Queen Street, about a block west of Spadina Avenue.

In November 2005, the swing's seat and two feet of the swing's chains were removed. This was supposedly the work of vandals. Two people named Vince and Kai replaced it on December 13 of the same year. The new swing seat bore a date, signatures, and has writing on it: “The Secret Swing belongs to the people of Toronto.”

The swing installation came to an end in March 2006 when both the swing and the bar holding it up were removed and a fence installed to block the entrance to the space where the swing was installed. This may have been done to thwart any future attempts to replace the swing, as well as deter homeless people from sleeping in the space between buildings.
