= Alexander Aitkin =

Scottish surveyor

Alexander Aitkin (or Aitken, born around 1771 and died 1799) was a Scottish surveyor. He served as deputy surveyor general in 1784 and later the first surveyor general of Upper Canada.

Aitkin was from Berwick-Upon-Tweed, Northumberland to David Aitken and possibly Catherine.

He served as deputy surveyor for Mecklenburg, Penetanguishene Harbour, and Lake Simcoe. He was responsible for surveying and creating the first city plan for Toronto and made plans for the York Harbour in 1793.

Lot Street, later to be renamed Queen Street, was the first concession street in York. The original street was 6,600 feet or 1.25 miles (approx. 2 km) in length. The street was used to divide the lands in the Liberties into park lots for residential use.

He died of tuberculosis at an early age and was buried in Kingston, Ontario on 1 January 1800.
