= Oh No, It's Love =

Studio album by The Bicycles
- Released: November 4, 2008
- Recorded: 2007–2008
- Genre: Indie pop
- Length: 37:49
- Label: Fuzzy Logic Recordings
- Producer: José Miguel Contreras

The Bicycles chronology
The Good, the Bad and the Cuddly (2006)	Oh No, It's Love (2008)

Oh No, It's Love is the second album by Canadian pop band The Bicycles. It is the first album to feature The Bicycles as a quartet, following Randy Lee's departure.

Produced by José Miguel Contreras of By Divine Right, the album also features appearances by friends and fellow musicians including Laura Barrett, Basia Bulat, and members of The Meligrove Band, The Old Soul, Woodhands, The Adorables, and The Sketchersons.

All songs were written collectively by Beckett, Scott, Smith, and Snell with the exception of "What A Fool" which was also written by Niall Fynes and the skit "Prove It" which was written by Inessa Frantowski and Holly Prazoff.

A music video has been shot for the song "Oh No, It's Love".

It is rated 4 out of 5 stars on AllMusic.

== Track listing ==
1. "Won't She Be Surprised" – 2:00
2. "One Twist Too Much" – 1:29
3. "I'll Wait For You" – 2:24
4. "Once Was Not Enough" – 2:52
5. "What A Fool" – 1:18
6. "Roland" – 1:37
7. "Green Light" – 1:07
8. "Walk Away (From A Good Thing)" – 3:23
9. "Oh No, It's Love" – 1:51
10. "Stop Calling Me Baby" – 1:52
11. "Sweet Petite" – 2:57
12. "No One Can Touch You Now" – 2:23
13. "End Of A Good Thing" – 1:54
14. "Thanks For Calling Me Baby" – 0:25
15. "Leave That Woman Alone" – 3:11
16. "Prove It" – 1:03
17. "It's A Good Thing" – 1:55
18. "Can I Keep Calling You Baby?" – 2:17
19. "Oh Yes, It's Love" – 1:53

== Personnel ==
The Bicycles are:

- Matt Beckett
- Drew Smith
- Dana Snell
- Andrew Scott
