= Dan Bryk =

Canadian musician (born 1970)

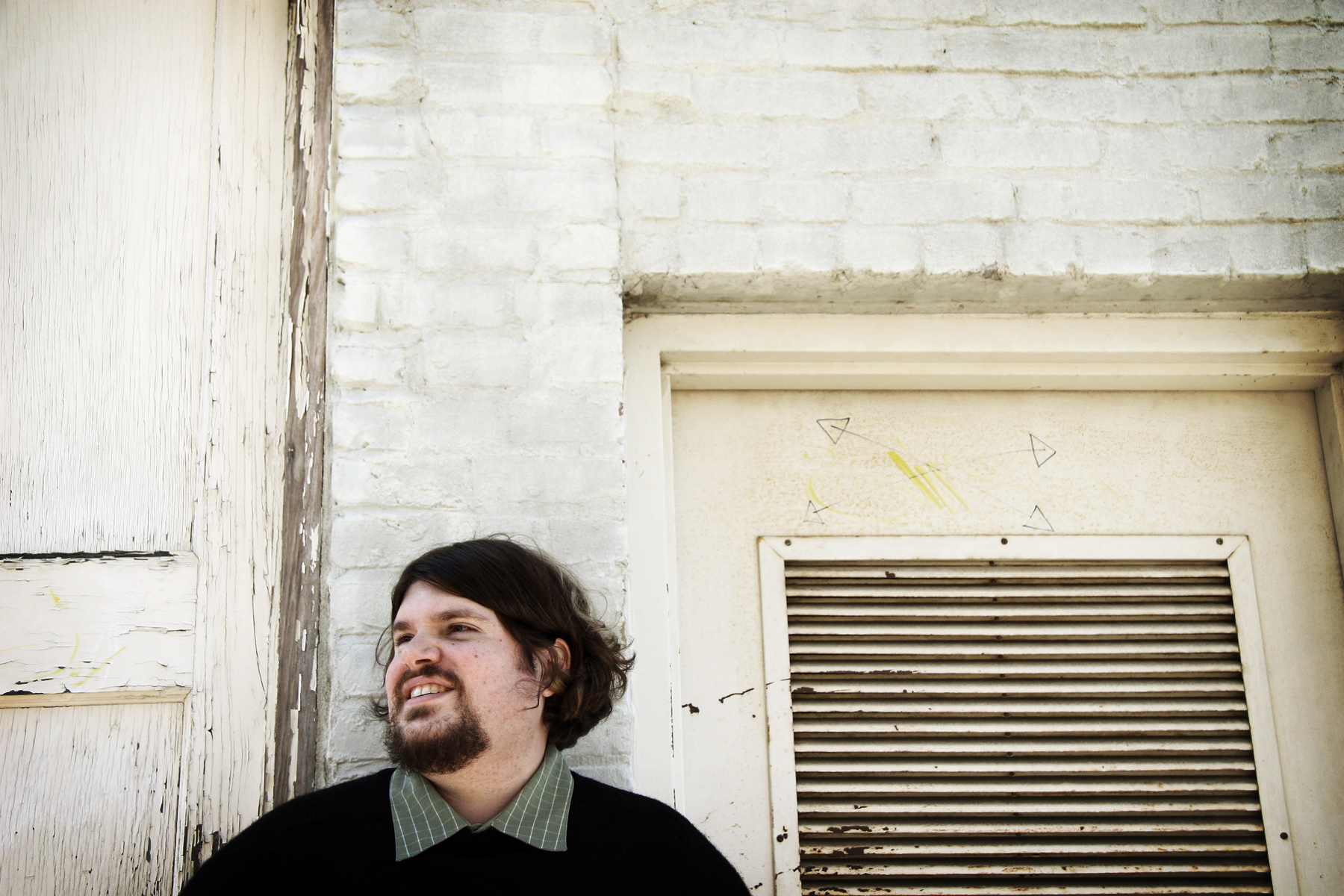

Background information
- Born: Dan Waldemar Bryk
- Origin: Mississauga, Ontario
- Genres: Indie; rock; pop
- Occupation: Singer-songwriter
- Years active: 1996–present
- Labels: Urban Myth; Firefly Music; Pop Up; Scratchie; Teenage USA Recordings; Avex
- Website: bryk.com

Dan Waldemar Bryk (born September 23, 1970) is a Canadian-born singer-songwriter and recording artist. Originally from Toronto, Bryk is currently based in Durham, North Carolina. A songwriter and keyboard player, Bryk has released five full-length albums and a handful of singles, EPs and tracks on compilations.

== Early life and musical beginnings ==
Dan Bryk grew up in suburban Mississauga, Ontario, where he attended several Public and Catholic schools and Queensway Cathedral School, a Pentecostal evangelical private school. His parents separated and reconciled during his late childhood.

At Age 8, Bryk briefly received piano lessons from Earl Mlotek at the Toronto Royal Conservatory of Music but dropped out due to hyperactivity and unwillingness to practice. Dan explored songwriting and wrote a few primitive songs throughout grade school, while playing flute in his grade school band and singing in school and church choirs.

While attending St. Martin's High School, Bryk joined the school's 8-track recording studio where he helped establish a recording club and recorded his own music under the pseudonymous band name The Cunning Linguists. He released a number of cassette albums under this name, submitting them to Toronto campus radio stations, selling tapes to his schoolmates, and consigning them to Toronto independent record stores with little fanfare. While the "Linguists" were essentially a studio project consisting of Bryk and occasional collaborator Mike Feraco, he gave an edgy solo debut performance (using MIDI sequencing and drum machine programming) at St. Martin's 1988 Battle of The Bands that was notably censored by Mississauga Cable 10 community access television. Bryk graduated from St. Martin's in 1989.

Bryk then attended the University of Guelph in Guelph, Ontario, initially majoring in English literature, but changing to fine art with a focus on photography and extended media practice. While he did not enroll in any music performance courses at Guelph, Bryk hungrily devoured jazz and popular music history classes under Prof. Howard Spring, and spent much of his time honing his craft as a songwriter in the music department's piano booths. A semester spent studying in London, England in 1992, absorbing the bustling Camden music scene only intensified Bryk's focus on becoming a singer-songwriter. Upon returning to Guelph, Bryk dropped to part-time status and began working as a graphic artist at a Mississauga design firm, all the while writing and demoing his compositions and developing his idiosyncratic, self-taught piano playing style.

== Canada ==
Bryk moved from the suburbs to downtown Toronto in 1994 and joined the Queen Street West music scene with the release of his largely self-performed debut CD Dan Bryk, Asshole. The CD received airplay from CBC Radio 2, CFNY's Indie Hour and nationwide college and community radio, and Dan was reviewed or interviewed in a variety of national press including Eye Weekly, National Chart and Exclaim!, most notably making Toronto Star music critic Peter Howell's Picks for '96 feature. Through the intercession of then-manager Ted Burley, Bryk assembled an accomplished band of Toronto scene veterans to gig and record a follow-up: guitarist/producer Kurt Swinghammer, bassist Maury Lafoy (also of The Supers and Sarah Harmer's and Jann Arden's backing bands), Supers/Charlie Major drummer Jeff Macpherson (and briefly, singer-songwriter/drummer Howie Beck). During this period, Bryk was also an occasional participant in Toronto's Serial Diners.

Asked to record a CBC Radio 2 RealTime session in 1997, the resulting tapes helped Bryk sign to NYC's Scratchie Records after a post-gig meeting with label co-owner Adam Schlesinger and Fountains of Wayne bandmate Chris Collingwood. Bryk then travelled to NYC for some additional recording with Schlesinger and his Ivy bandmate Andy Chase and final album mixing with Jim Rondinelli (Sloan, Matthew Sweet, Wilco). Originally intended for release by Scratchie through joint venture partner Mercury Records, Bryk's Scratchie/Mercury debut was delayed, then ultimately abandoned due to corporate restructuring following a merger with Universal Music.

Once again independent of major label distribution, Scratchie released Bryk's Lovers Leap CD in October 2000, and it received a positive review from Robert Christgau and meagre sales. Lovers Leap (which charted in CMJ) featured cameos from the odd assortment of Canadian musicians Bryk had befriended via Asshole: Danny Michel, Howie Beck, Chris Warren, Kyp Harness, Jacksoul frontman (and Guelph college roommate) Haydain Neale, outsider chanteuse Kathleen Yearwood and a cappella harmonists Moxy Früvous. Bryk was pictured shirtless on the back cover of Toronto third wave Ska band King Apparatus' Hospital Waiting Room EP after that band's Mitch Girio played on "Dan Bryk, Now" and "Dan Bryk, Asshole." Oft-regarded as a songwriter's songwriter, Bryk was the recipient of an Ontario Arts Council Popular Songwriting grant in 2002.

Bryk toured to support Lovers Leap throughout Canada and the US, and also toured Japan in 2001 with Stephen Malkmus for Lovers Leap's release by Avex Trax Japan (where the singles I love you goodbye and She Doesn't Mean A Thing To Me Tonight were minor radio hits). A promotional video for She Doesn't Mean A Thing (reprised from 'Dan Bryk, Asshole') received light rotation on Muchmusic and wide video play in Japan. Bryk's music has been mashed and remixed by The Kendall Mintcake and DJ Morgan David respectively, and She Doesn't Mean A Thing was featured in the soundtrack of the 2006 indie feature film Bums (film)|Bums.

== United States ==
Bryk moved to Durham, NC in 2003 with his life partner Erin McGinn, settling in neighbouring Raleigh. Immigration issues and further label wrangling (Bryk was dropped by Scratchie in 2004 after the latter's acquisition by New Line Records) kept him from touring or releasing new material until 2006, when Florida indie label Pop-Up Records released the tracks "We Don't Care" and "BecaRebecca" as part of their ongoing Singles Club.

Bryk's third full-length CD Dan Bryk Christmas Record was released by the Urban Myth Recording Collective in November 2006. Christmas Record received enthusiastic reviews (including a 4-star review from indie tastemaker Pitchfork) and regional college radio airplay. Bryk's local hit Love Me For Christmas inspired the creation of Have A Holly Raleigh Christmas, a benefit project to raise funds for Raleigh high school band instruments that also featured Raleigh indie rock notables The Rosebuds, Schooner and Nathan Asher.

Under the pseudonym Tha Commissioners, Bryk released the song Cherry Berry, an ode to North Carolina Secretary of Labor Cherie K. Berry. He gave the song anonymously to the college radio station WKNC, and it quickly became a local hit. For a time, Bryk avoided being associated with the song, and only admitted to recording it when his anonymous e-mails about the song were found to originate from his home computer. The song would later appear as a hidden track on the Discount Store EP.

An occasional sideman and producer, Bryk has also toured and recorded with Down By Avalon, Nova Social, The Bicycles, The American Flag, and singer-songwriters Django Haskins and Spookey Ruben.

As a founding member of the Urban Myth Recording Collective, Bryk has collaborated on and/or enabled the commercial release of recordings by Chris Warren, Luke Jackson, Chris Staig, Corey Landis, Lee Feldman, Down By Avalon, Bull City, Nova Social and Amy Allison.

Bryk is allegedly the inspiration for and subject of David Celia's song "Cactus" and "Stubborn Man" by The Old Ceremony.

Bryk married McGinn in 2008, relocating to New York City in Spring 2009. His long-delayed album Pop Psychology was soft-released in the Fall of 2009 by Urban Myth to an encouraging critical response including several "Best of 2009" lists but Bryk went into hiatus soon after the birth of his child Henry and the record languished in obscurity.

As a member and organizer of the NYC Dads Group he has become a public advocate for his role as stay-at-home dad.

Bryk scored and contributed original songs to the soundtrack of the as-yet-unreleased 2011 indie short RIPE.

On Valentine's Day 2012, Bryk released Live at Bread & Circus, a nine-song album of a 2009 concert in Toronto, as a free download.

Bryk relocated to Dar es Salaam, Tanzania in 2013. In August 2013 he publicly announced an expanded reissue of his best-known recording Lovers Leap and another recording possibly titled Lies of Girls and Women.

At the end of 2013, Bryk moved to Washington, DC. He later moved back to Durham, NC towards the end of 2016.

== Discography ==
Year	Title	Format	Label	
1995	Dan Bryk, Now!	Cass EP	No! Discs (Canada)	
1996	Dan Bryk, Asshole	CD/8-Track/Cass	No! Discs (Can)	
2000	Dan Bryk Rocks Nobody	7-inch EP	Eutectic (Can)	Initial copies also came with CD EP
2001	Lovers Leap	CD	Scratchie (US) teenage USA (Can)	
2002	Lovers Leap	CD	Avex (Japan)	Adds bonus tracks and expanded artwork/liner notes
2003	Mississauga Rattler	Download	Urban Myth (US)	Initially a fanclub-only demo CD, later downloadable from Bandcamp
2005	We Don't Care	Digital Single	Pop Up Records (US)	
2006	Dan Bryk Christmas Record	CD	Urban Myth (US)	
2007	Discount Store	CD EP	Urban Myth (US)	
2009	Pop Psychology	CD	Urban Myth (US)	
2012	Live at Bread & Circus	Download	Urban Myth (US)	Free live recording released Valentine's Day 2012
2014	A Bryk at the Radio	Download	Urban Myth (US)	Radio sessions and interviews compilation
2018	Collection Plate: The Best of Dan Bryk	Vinyl LP	You Are The Cosmos (Spain)	Career anthology with new and unreleased tracks
2023	Emily's Tender	Digital Single	Urban Myth/Fuck Music (US)	Lead single from album The Pains That Come With Age

== Radio interviews ==
- Interview with Matthew Revell of WCR-FM Wolverhampton, England June 13, 2008
- Interview and performance of "Discount Store" with Sook-Yin Lee of CBC Radio 2 "Definitely Not The Opera" September 15, 2007
- Interview with Shelagh Rogers of CBC Radio 1 "Sounds Like Canada" September 3, 2007
- Interview with Bob Langford of WPTF News Talk 680, Raleigh NC July 21, 2007
- Interview with Pseu Braun of WFMU, Jersey City NJ February 16, 2007
- Interview with Steve Salevan of WKNC, Raleigh NC October 20, 2006
- Interview with Pseu Braun of WFMU, Jersey City NJ January 19, 2001

== Uncited Articles ==
- Robert Wilonsky, Bang To Hype, Dallas Observer, March 21, 2002. Major subject of article about SXSW, state of music business.
- Ross M. Miller, The Political Economy of Pop, Miller Risk Advisors, August 8, 2005. Citation.
- John Sakamoto, The Anti-Hit List, The Toronto Star, December 16, 2006. Review.
- Dan Bryk FAQ
- Dan Bryk Press Archive
