= Nova Social =

- Origin: New York and New Jersey
- Genres: Electronic pop
- Years active: 1998–present
- Labels: Big Sleep Records, American Laundromat, Kabukikore Records
- Members: David Nagler; Thom Soriano
- Website: www.novasocial.com

Nova Social is an electronic pop duo from New York and New Jersey. They have released two EPs and two full-length albums, and also recorded the theme song to Cartoon Network's Calling Cat-22. Band member David Nagler has arranged and produced tracks for Chicago singer/songwriter Chris Mills, provided choral arrangements for The Mekons' Jon Langford and the Burlington Welsh Male Chorus, and plays guitar and piano in John Wesley Harding & The English UK. Band member Thom Soriano has recorded electronic compositions and remixed tracks for artists (including They Might Be Giants and Dan Bryk) as The Kendal Mintcake.

== Band members ==
- David Nagler - vocals, instruments, programming
- Thom Soriano - instruments, programming, sampling

== Discography ==
- Nova Social (EP) (Big Sleep Records, 2009)
- Other Words From Tomorrow's Dictionary (Big Sleep Records, 2007)
- High School Reunion (compilation) (American Laundromat Records, 2005)
- There Is No Hidden Meaning (compilation) (Kabukikore Records, 2004)
- The Jefferson Fracture (Big Sleep Records, 2002)
- Don't Settle for Walking (EP as Stretch) (Big Sleep Records, 1998)
