= Fuzzy Logic Recordings =

- Founded: 2002
- Founder: Maria Bui
- Genre: Indie rock
- Country of origin: Canada
- Location: Toronto, Ontario, Canada
- Official website: www.fuzzylogicrecordings.com

Fuzzy Logic Recordings is a Canadian independent record label, founded in 2002 and based out of Toronto, Ontario.

== Artists ==
- The Bicycles
- The Elwins
- More Or Les
- Peter Project

== Discography ==
- FLR001 The Midways - Pay More And Get A Good Seat
- FLR002 The Bicycles - The Good, the Bad and the Cuddly
- FLR003 Woodhands/Peter Project - Split 7"
- FLR004 The Bicycles - The Good, The Bad and the Cuddly: The Interactive DVD Board Game
- FLR005 Prairie Cat - Attacks!
- FLR006 Peter Project - Peter Project
- FLR007 The Bicycles - Oh No, It's Love
- FLR008 Prairie Cat - It Began/Ended with Sparks
- FLR009 Gravity Wave - Gambol
- FLR010 Peter Project - Fresh
- FLR011 The Elwins - The Elwins (Ep) - re-release
- FLR012 Steven McKay - Steven McKay (2010)
- FLR013 Doctor Ew - Gadzooks! (2010)
- FLR014 More Or Les - Brunch With A Vengeance (2010)
- FLR015 More Or Les - Mastication (2012)
- FLR016 The Bicycles - Stop Thinking So Much (2012)
- FLR017 The Bicycles - Young Drones (2014)
- FLR018 Fake Palms - Fake Palms (2015) co-release
- FLR019 Prairie Cat - Is Cary Pratt (2017)

== See also ==
- List of record labels
