= Faiyum Light Railway =

Egyptian light railway

Fayoum Light Railway
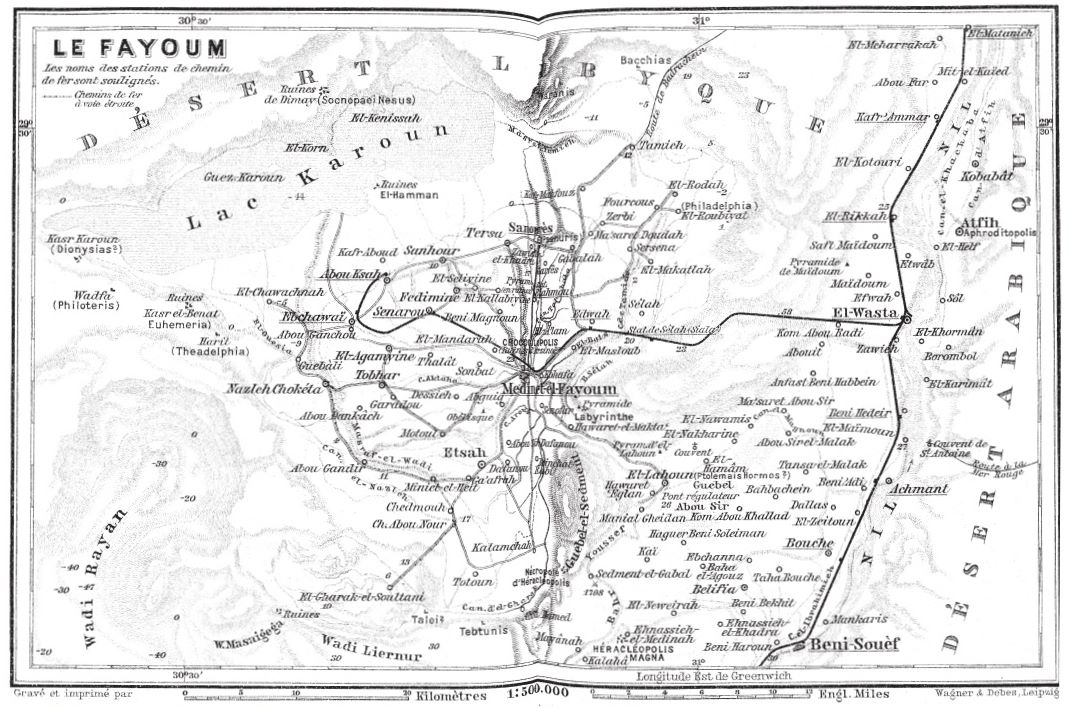
- Railway stations of Fayoum Light Railway as shown in Baedeker of 1908

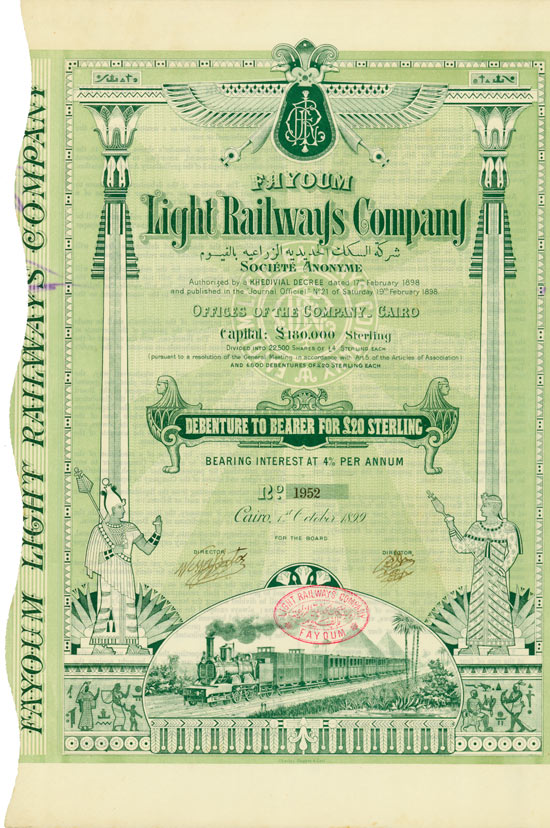
- Company bond certificate, 1 October 1899; the left edge is indentured.

Technical
- Track gauge: 750 mm (2 ft 5½ in)
- Length: 106 mi (171 km)

The Fayoum Light Railway (FLR) was a 750 mm (2 ft 5 1/2 in) gauge Egyptian light railway. Founded by a group of Egyptian Coptic investors, it operated in the first half of the twentieth century.

== Construction ==
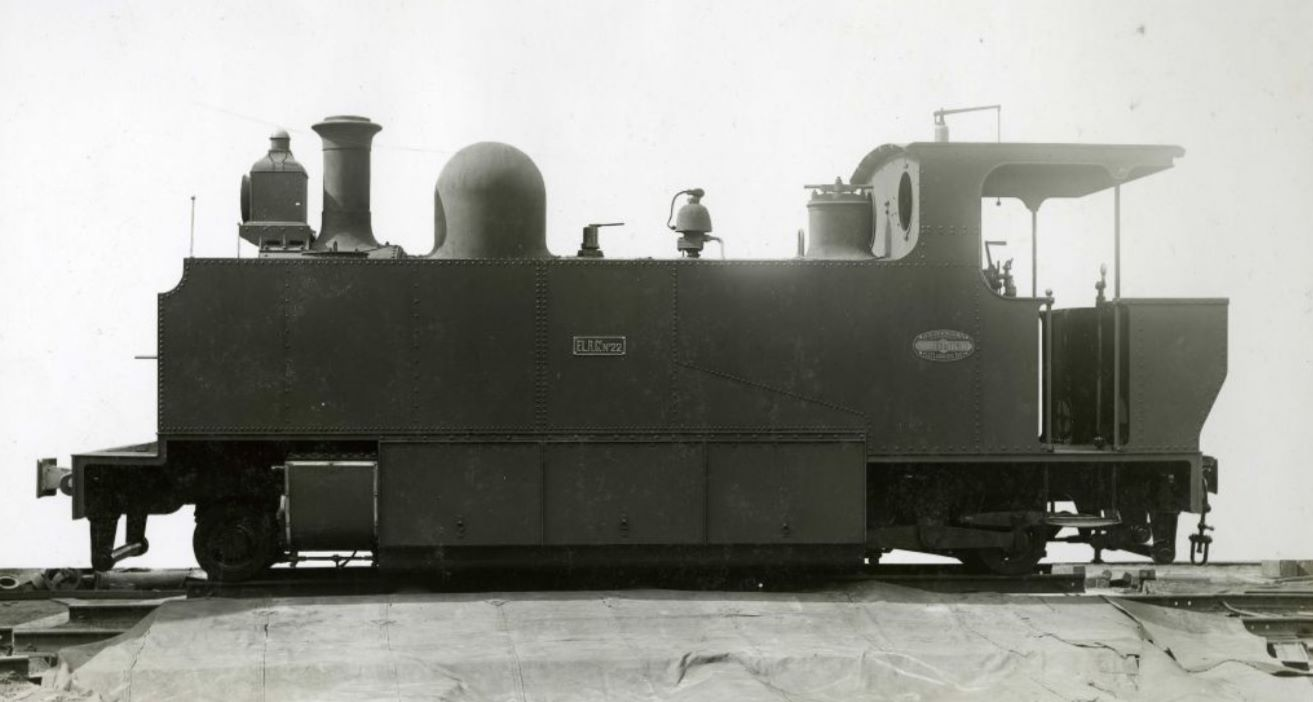
Tubize steam Engine No 22 of the FLR

Construction began in 1898. The railway served an irrigation district south of Cairo, centred on the provincial capital of Medinet-el-Fayoum. The track network comprised seven, mostly roadside, branch lines with a total length of 106 miles (171 km). British railway engineer Everard Calthrop was a consultant on this railway.

== Operation ==
The railway was mainly used for transporting sugar cane and other agricultural produce, but it also transported passengers. In 1904 a total of 618,000 passengers and 145,000 tons of goods were carried.

The Government Inspector reported in 1904 very unfavourably on the Fayoum Company, which was managed for the first five years after its incorporation by S. Sandison de Bilinski. The railway was apparently in need of a competent manager. "The Staff" the inspector wrote, "appear to be entirely out of hand, and the Traffic and Locomotive Departments have both apparently been left to run by themselves."

In 1936, the company owned 17 locomotives, 2 railcars, 52 coaches and 248 goods wagons.

== Fossils ==
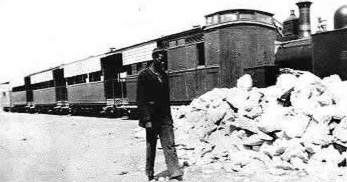
Transport of the fossils of Walter Grangers Fayoum Expedition, 1907

The American vertebrate paleontologist Walter Granger used the railway in April 1907 during his expedition, which was sponsored by the American Museum of Natural History in New York for transporting the fossils that he had found from Tamieh (Tamia) to Cairo.

== Anthrosol ==
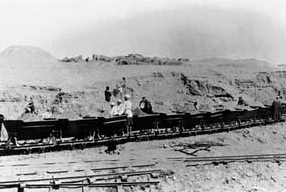
Light railway near Karanis in the Fayoum, 1920s

The railway tracks were probably also used by a company that harvested a rich anthrosol, locally called sibakh, which consists of decomposed organic debris, left by the ancient Egyptians. The workers, who dug pits for removing the soil, found well preserved papyri, which were sold to collectors and museums. This caused some interest by archeologists, who closed a deal with the Italian managers of the company that sold the compost, by which the team of the archeologists had to dig-out a sufficient amount of compost to keep the company and their rail vehicles busy, while they were searching for the papyri from 1928 to 1935.

== Takeover and continuing use ==
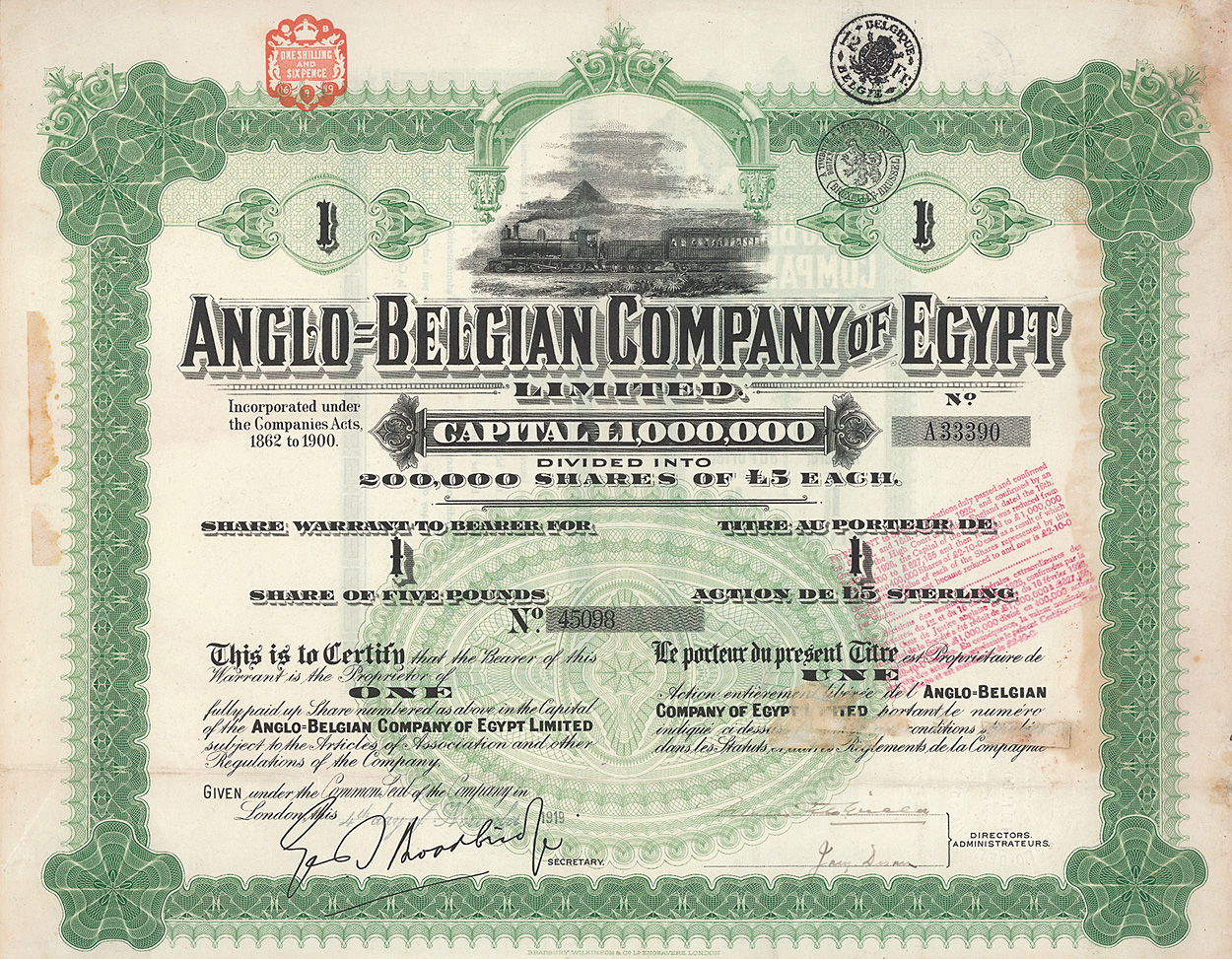
Stock certificate of the Anglo-Belgian Company of Egypt, 1906, showing a train in front of a pyramid

The majority of the shares in the Fayoum company (80%) was transferred in 1906 to the Anglo-Belgian Company of Egypt, which had been organized in the same year in London for this purpose. It also owned some properties in the centre of Cairo, for instance the garden of the Ghezireh Palace Hotel and the ground of the French Institute. Baron Georges de Reuter became the first president of the company. He was a relative of Baron Paul Julius von Reuter, the founder of the news agency Reuters Telegraphic Co.

Joseph Kfoury, who owned and operated already some coach lines in the Fayoum province, acquired a significant part of the shares of the Fayoum Light Railways Company in 1939, and was nominated to be its manager. Its headquarters were located in the al-Immobilia building at this time.

Some of the stock exchange certificates were re-issued on 1 May 1944, which demonstrates that the company still existed during World War II, although no time tables for passenger transport had been issued since 1938. After the war, operations ceased, although the government's concession would have been valid for 70 years, i.e., up to 1972.

== Lines and stations ==
130.
FAYUM – GHARAQ

- Fayum
- Shaikh Hassan
- Abgig
- Barmaki
- Massara
- Sawafna
- Difino
- Etsa
- Guaafra
- Miniet-el-Heit
- Shidmoh
- Abou Nour
- Danial
- Gharaq

131.
MINIET-EL-HEID – SHAWASHNA

- Miniet-el-Heit (see 130)
- Nawara
- Abou-Guandir
- El-Wanaissa
- Mokhtalata
- Abou-Hamach
- Nezlet-Balad
- Kasr-el-Guibali
- Gebel Saad
- Shawashna

132.
FAYUM — AGAMIYNE/NEZLEH-WADI

- Fayum (see 130)
- Shaikh Hassan (see 130)
- Soufi
- Abou Eche
- Omar Bey
- Aly Bey
- Manchat—Halfa
- Hereit
- Georges Eid a Guaradu
- Tobhar

→ Nezleh-Wadi a Agamiyne (branch)

- Agamiine
- Abou-Hanach

133.
FAYUM — QALAMSHA

- Fayum (see 130)
- Sheikh Hassan (see 128)
- Maghraby

→ Deir-el-Azzab (branch)

- Azab
- Ezbet Qalamsha
- Ezbet Mattar
- Qalamsha

134.
FAYUM — LAHUN

- Fayum (see 130)
- Quhafa
- Guinedi
- Rushdi
- Khaled Bey
- Hawara
- Bahr-Seila
- Dimishkine (Minshat Kamal)
- Bash-Kateb
- Lahun

135.
FAYUM — RODAH

- Fayum (see 130)
- Massloub
- Edwa
- Mittertaris (Matar Taris)
- Ekhssas
- Massaret-Douda
- Kafr Mahfouz
- Tamieh (terminus)
- Rodah (via 137)

136.
MASSARET-DOUDA — SENNORES

- Massaret-Douda (see 135)
- Guabala
- Sennorés

137. MITTERTARIS — RODAH

- Mittertaris (see 135)
- Kafr-Koleib
- Sersina
- Forkos
- Rodah (see 135)
