= Queen Street (Toronto) =

Thoroughfare in Toronto, Ontario

Coordinates: 43.649584°N 79.39241°W

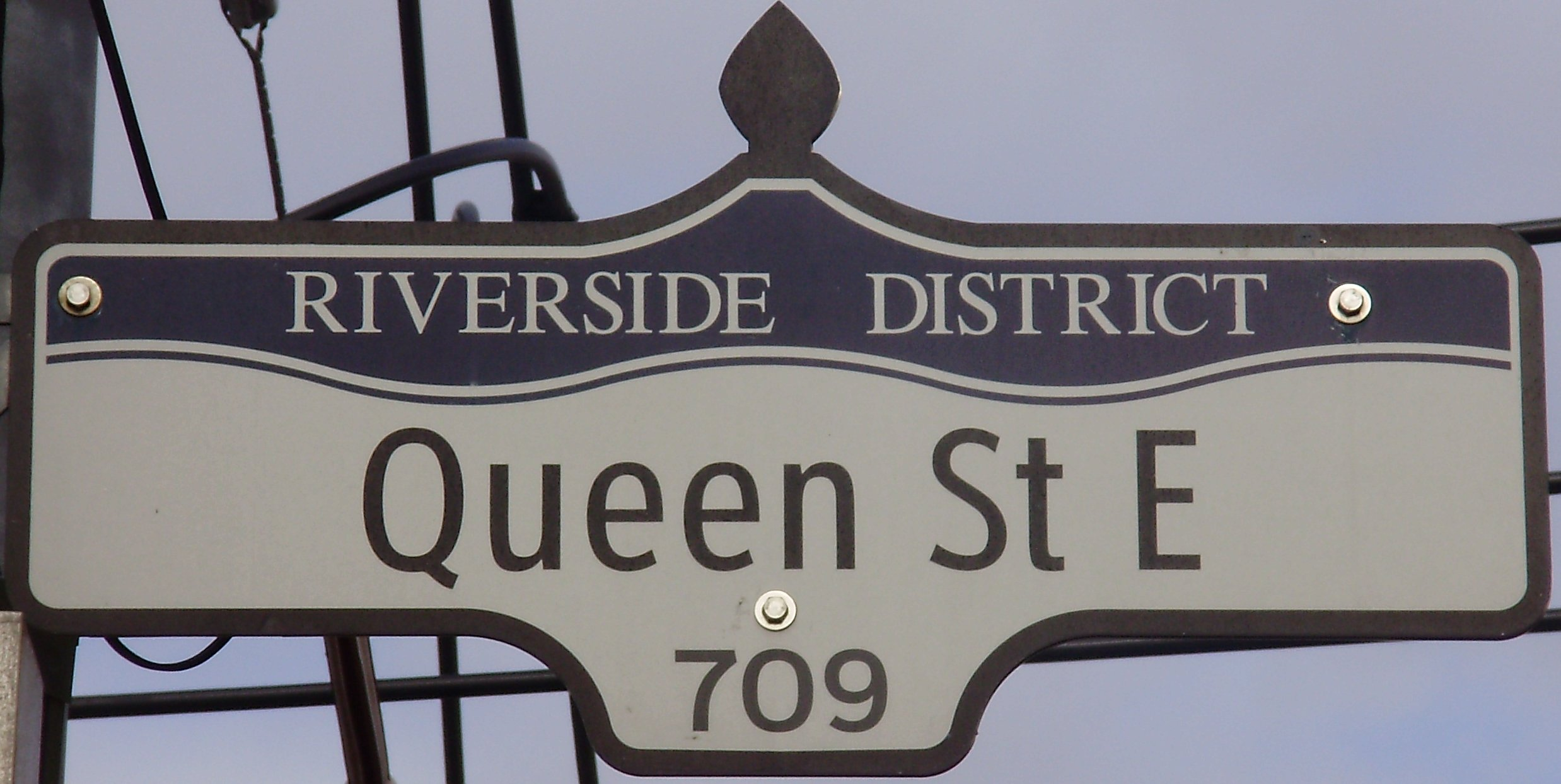

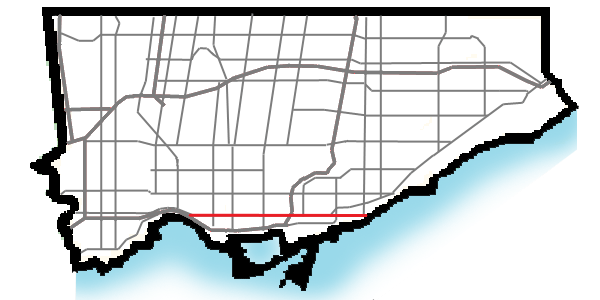
- Maintained by: City of Toronto government
- Length: 14.2 km (8.8 mi)
- West end: Roncesvalles Avenue/King Street (continues as The Queensway)
- Major junctions: Dufferin Street; University Avenue; Yonge Street; Jarvis Street; King Street; Broadview Avenue; Jones Avenue; Coxwell Avenue; Woodbine Avenue; Victoria Park Avenue
- East end: Fallingbrook Road (east of Victoria Park Avenue)

Construction
- Commissioned: 1793 (as Lot St.); 1851 (renamed Queen St.)

Other
Nearby arterial roads in Toronto
← King Street	Dundas Street →

Queen Street is a major east–west thoroughfare in Toronto, Ontario, Canada. It extends from Roncesvalles Avenue and King Street in the west to Victoria Park Avenue in the east. Queen Street was the cartographic baseline for the original east–west avenues of Toronto's and York County's grid pattern of major roads. The western section of Queen (sometimes simply referred to as "Queen West") is a centre for Canadian broadcasting, music, fashion, performance, and the visual arts.

== History ==
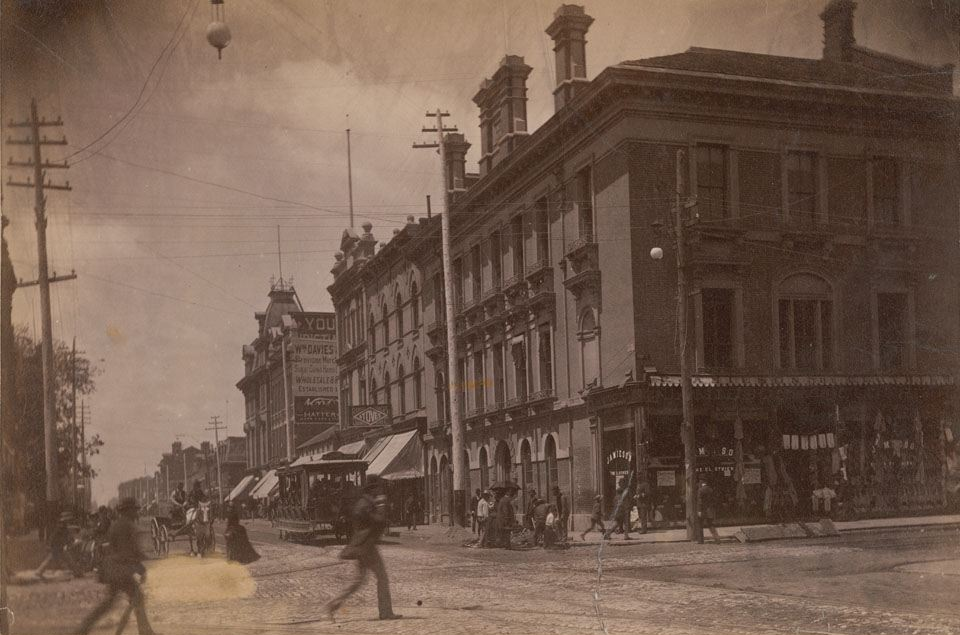
Looking west along Queen Street from Yonge Street, c. 1885

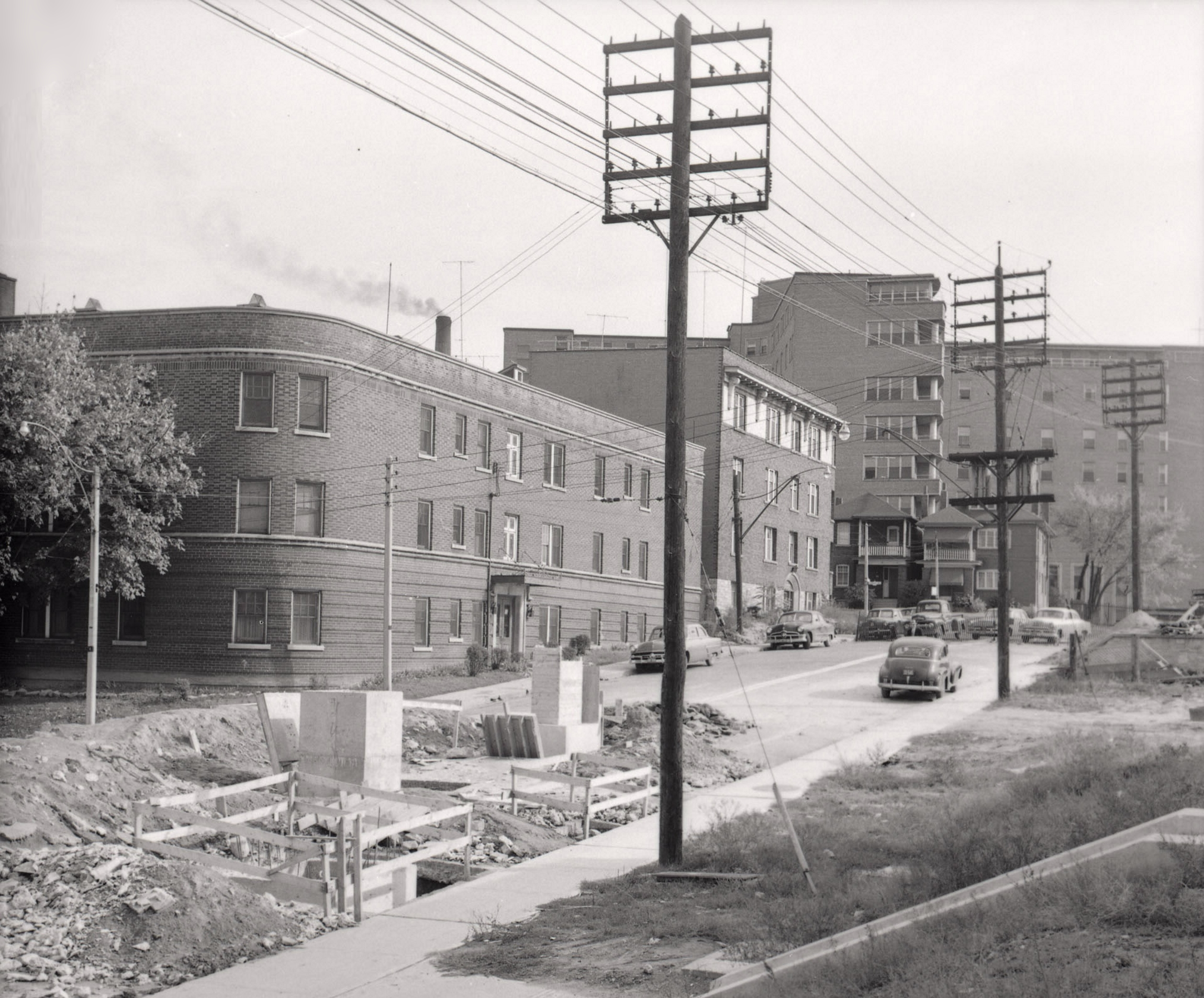
Former section of Queen St. west of Roncesvalles Ave. in 1956, before becoming absorbed into The Queensway, which is under construction at bottom left

Since the original survey in 1793 by Sir Alexander Aitkin, commissioned by Lieutenant Governor John Graves Simcoe, Queen Street has had many names. For its first sixty years, many sections were referred to as Lot Street, section west of Spadina was named Egremont Street until about 1837. East of the Don River to near Coxwell Avenue it was part of Kingston Road (and resuming as Queen Street thereafter), and was the westernmost section of that historic route to Kingston, Ontario, whose western terminus today is just east of Coxwell. The first park lots laid out in the new city of York (which would be renamed Toronto in 1834) were given to loyal officials who were willing to give up the amenities of modern cities such as Kingston to take up residence in the forests north of Lot Street. These 40 hectares (99 acres) lots were placed along the south side of the first east–west road laid in York, Lot Street. In the 1840s, Lot Street was renamed in honour of Queen Victoria.

"Queen West" is local vernacular which generally refers to the collection of neighbourhoods that have developed along and around the thoroughfare. Many of these were originally ethnically-based neighbourhoods. The earliest example from the mid-19th century was Claretown, an Irish immigrant enclave in the area of Queen Street West and Bathurst Street. From the 1890s to the 1930s, Jewish immigrants coalesced in the neighbourhood known as "the Ward", for which Queen Street between Yonge and University served as the southern boundary. The intersection of Queen and Bay Streets also served as the southern end of a thriving Chinatown in the 1930s. From the 1920s to the 1950s, the area was also the heart of Toronto's Polish and Ukrainian communities. From the 1950s through the 1970s, many immigrants from Portugal settled in the area. Gentrification over the past twenty years has caused most recent immigrants to gradually move to more affordable areas of the city as desirability of the area drives up prices.

Like other gentrified areas of Toronto, the original "Queen West" —the stretch between University Avenue and Spadina Avenue — is now lined with upscale boutiques, chain stores, restaurants, tattoo parlours and hair salons. Perhaps the best-known landmark on this section of Queen West is the broadcast hub at 299 Queen Street West, formerly the headquarters of Citytv and MuchMusic and earlier the site of the Ryerson Press, now housing the broadcast operations of a number of television outlets owned by Bell Media. Queen Street East, though not as famous as Queen Street West, is known for its shopping, especially in nearby neighbourhoods.

Until the 1940s and 50's Queen Street extended west (in several sections) along what is today The Queensway, with the name changed through the westernmost segment though the former Etobicoke in 1947 to avoid confusion due to the break. The other sections were a stub of the street continuing west of Roncesvalles and ending at Colborne Lodge Drive by High Park, and a short side street in Swansea running west from Ellis Avenue. When The Queensway was extended east in the 1950s, the latter two section where absorbed into it, rather than having the name "Queen Street" restored to the now-continuous street, likely due to the Borough of Etobicoke desiring a counterpart to another street called The Kingsway.

A legacy of The Queensway being formerly part of Queen Street is still evident in a parallel street known as North Queen Street north of Sherway Gardens, which was once a jogged section of Queen St./The Queensway west of Kipling Avenue, later bypassed by a direct extension of the street's southern baseline to connect to The Middle Road, the precursor to the Queen Elizabeth Way, and later still reconnected to the Upper Middle Road, which is today Queensway through Mississauga.

During the 1982 Toronto municipal election candidate Deanne Taylor established headquarters at The Cameron House - performing nightly with the Hummer Sisters west of Spadina.

== Route ==
=== Fallingbrook to Woodbine: The Beaches ===
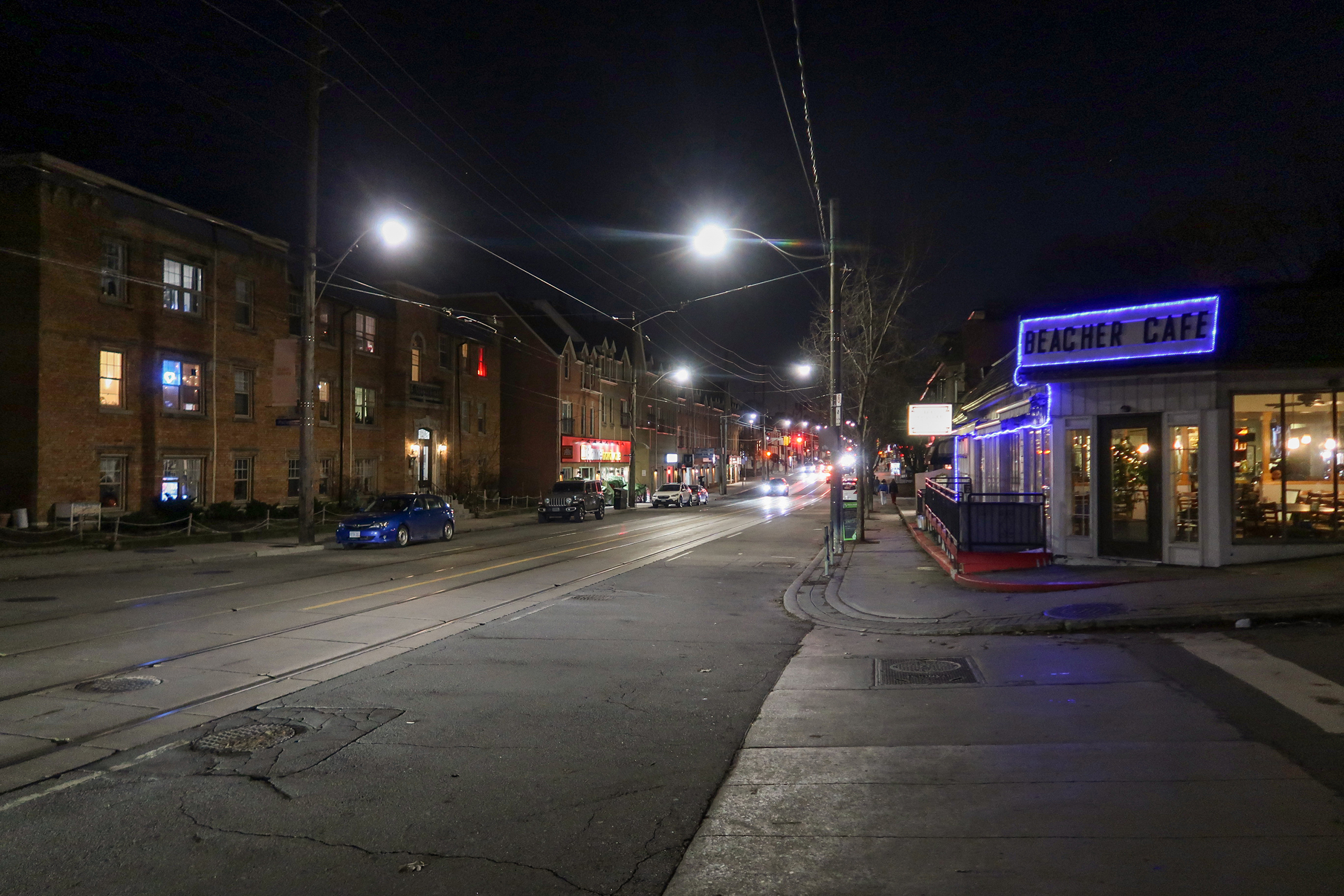
Restaurants in The Beaches

The commercial district of Queen Street East lies at the heart of The Beaches community. It is characterized by a large number of independent specialty stores. The stores along Queen are known to change tenants quite often causing the streetscape to change from year to year, sometimes drastically. East of Woodbine Avenue, Queen street has less traffic and is effectively reduced to one lane each way (the outer lanes are used for on-street parking). The centre lanes are used by the 501 streetcar. The first few blocks from Fallingbrook Rd. to Victoria Park Ave. are located in Scarborough, the easternmost part of Toronto, where Queen is only a minor residential side street, which continues west to the Neville Park streetcar loop, the eastern end of the 501 route, before widening into a thoroughfare. Around the intersection with Victoria Park, the south side of the street is beside the R. C. Harris Water Treatment Plant, a crucial water treatment plant for both Toronto and York Region.

=== Woodbine to Coxwell ===
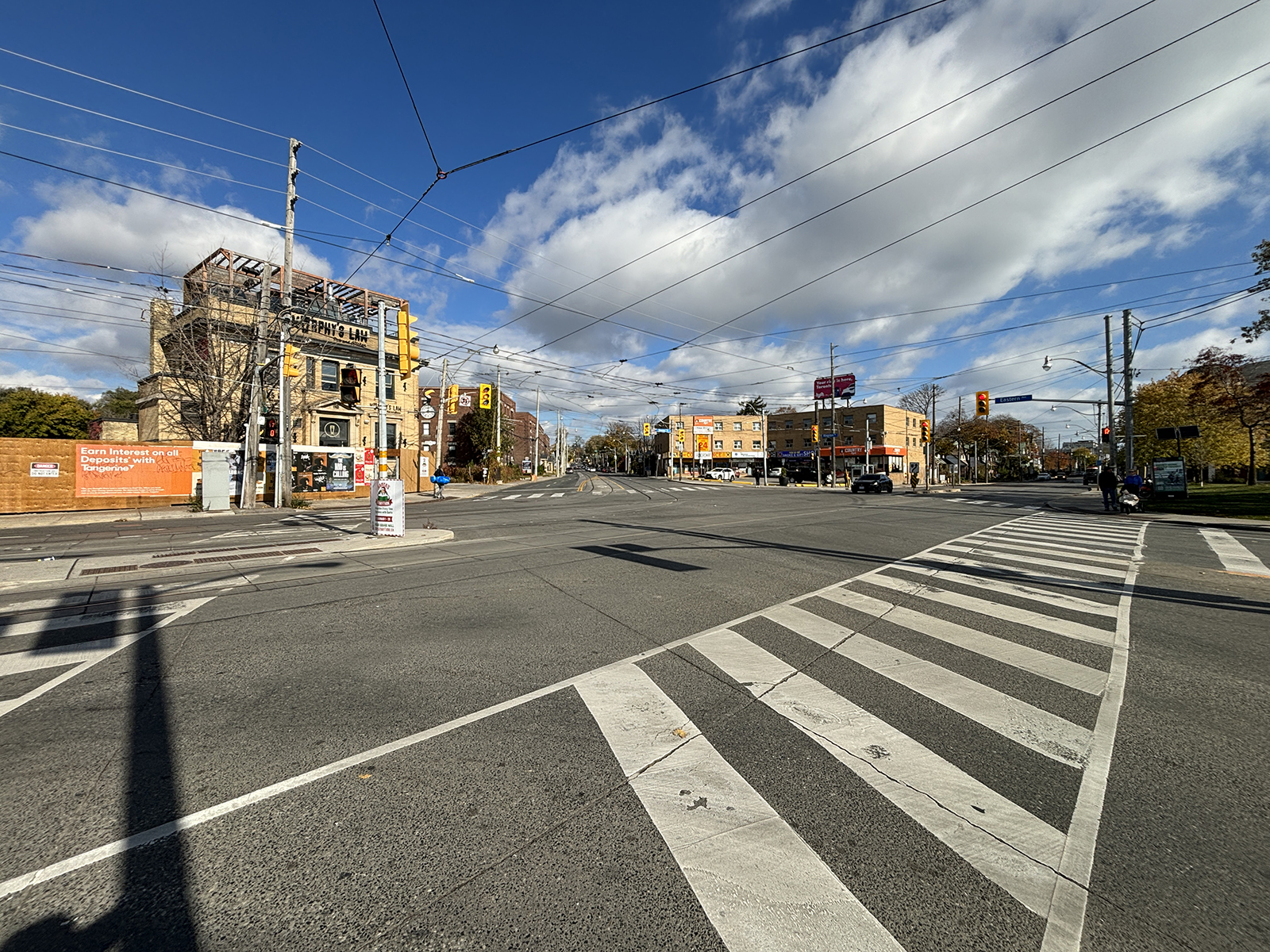
Queen St East at Kingston Road in 2023

From Woodbine to Coxwell, Queen Street is in parts of two neighbourhoods, Upper Beaches and The Beaches. From Woodbine to Kingston Road, there's a mix of newer commercial/residential buildings. The northern half is covered with various modern looking stores, with the southern half covered by a retail development by The Behar Group, consisting of 5 residential condos, with ground floor retail spaces. The section of Kingston to Coxwell is similar in design, but without the retail development on the southern side, including the Alliance Cinemas The Beach location. A little to east of the Queen/Eastern/Kingston intersection there is the northern border of Woodbine Park, used for outdoor events.

=== Coxwell to Jones: Leslieville ===
The area from Greenwood to Logan is known as Leslieville. Queen passes underneath the elevated CN railway tracks, and this marks the border of Leslieville. Queen Street East is the commercial hub of Leslieville. In Leslieville, Queen is home to many small stores and restaurants. From Greenwood (Vancouver Avenue) to Woodfield, the northern side of the street is beside the Ashbridge Estate, a large historic estate. The Russell Carhouse is also on this stretch of Queen Street.

=== Jones to Don River: Riverdale ===
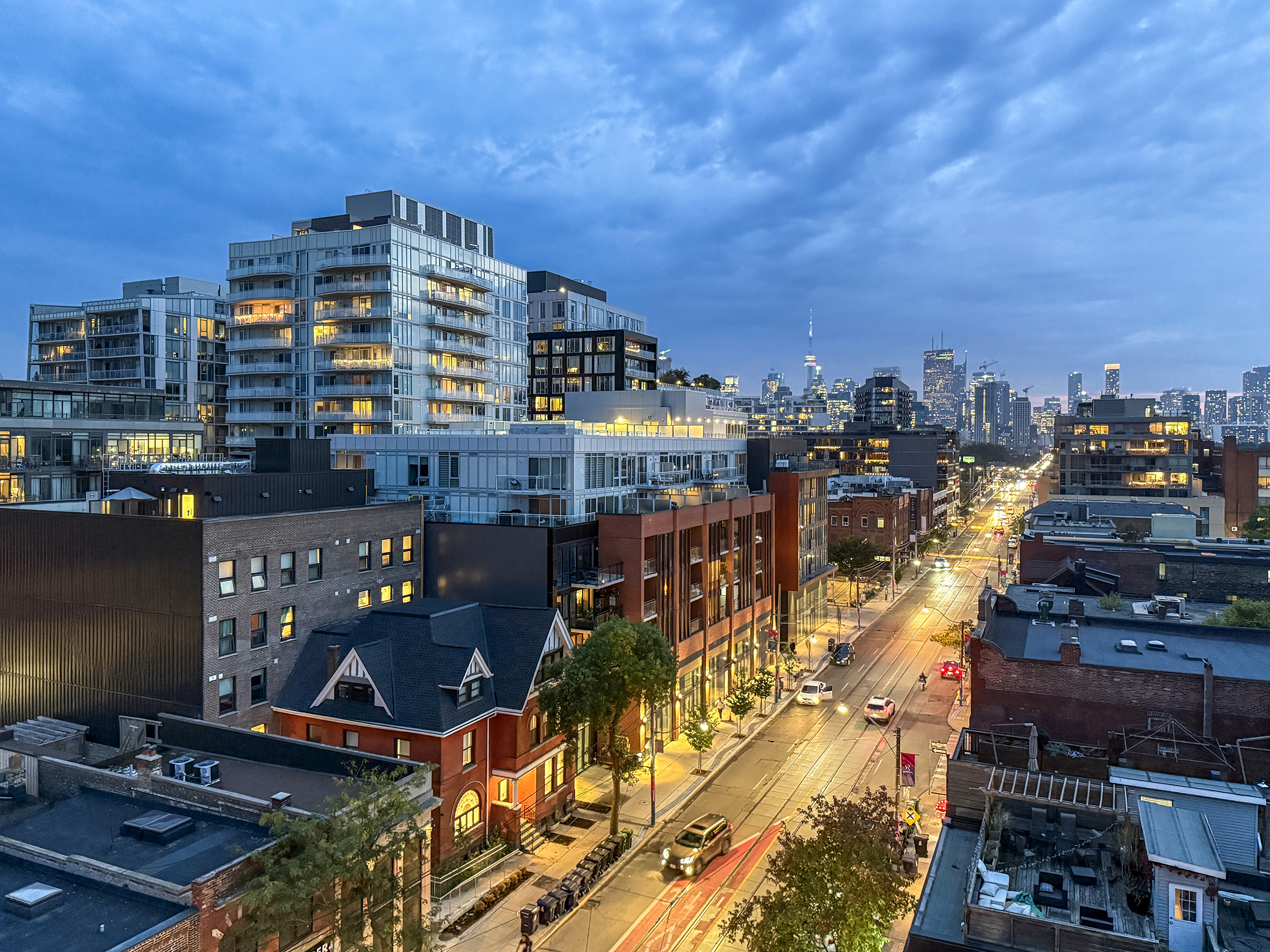
Queen St East in Riverdale

The place between Logan and the Don River is called Riverdale. Since its amendment to the City of Toronto in 1884, the area has developed a stature as a neighbourhood of independent arts, with several independent galleries located along Queen Street East. The residential landscape within Riverdale is made up primarily of Victorian and Edwardian style homes, constructed in the 1800s as boarding rooms for the working-class. It is a mixed income and multicultural area, currently experiencing a trend of gentrification along Queen Street East. Queen is home to a number of landmarks in this area, including the New Edwin Hotel, New Broadview House Hotel, The Opera House, and the Ralph Thornton Community Centre.

=== Queen Street Viaduct ===
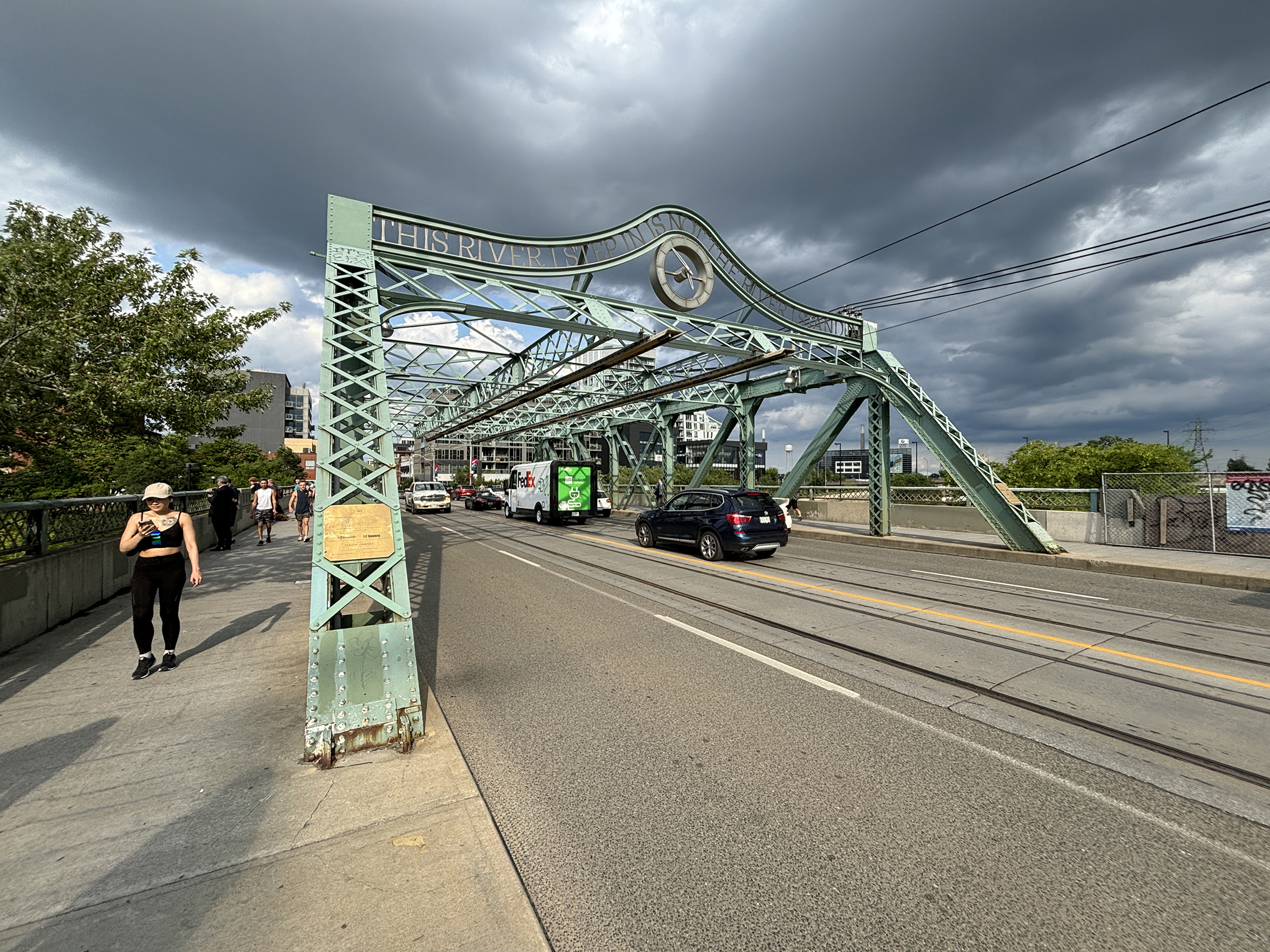
Queen Street Don River bridge

The Queen Street Viaduct, along with the surrounding bridges, carry traffic on Queen Street over the Don River. The bridge was originally constructed in 1803 as a wooden bridge. The current bridge was conducted in 1910 and is a steel truss bridge. The surrounding bridge goes east to Davies Avenue and west to River Street, splitting into Queen Street and King Street just west Bayview Avenue (east of River Street).

=== Don River to Yonge ===
The section for the Don River to Yonge Street is located in Downtown Toronto. East of Parliament Street is the Trefann Court area that was the site of a major debate over development in the 1960s. Until reaching Jarvis Street, the north side is the Moss Park neighbourhood, with the park and Moss Park Armoury along the street. South of Queen is the Corktown neighbourhood. In the east side of downtown it passes St. Michael's Hospital and Metropolitan United Church. At Yonge Street in the downtown core, the street is in the Financial District and at the Eaton Centre.

=== Yonge to University ===
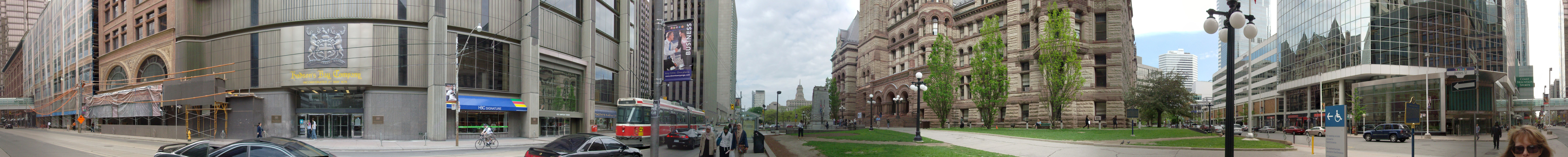
Queen Street West at James Street; 360 degree panoramic photo showing (from left to right) The Bay, Simpsons Tower, with a route 501 Queen TTC streetcar, Old City Hall, the Cadillac-Fairview tower, and the Eaton Centre.

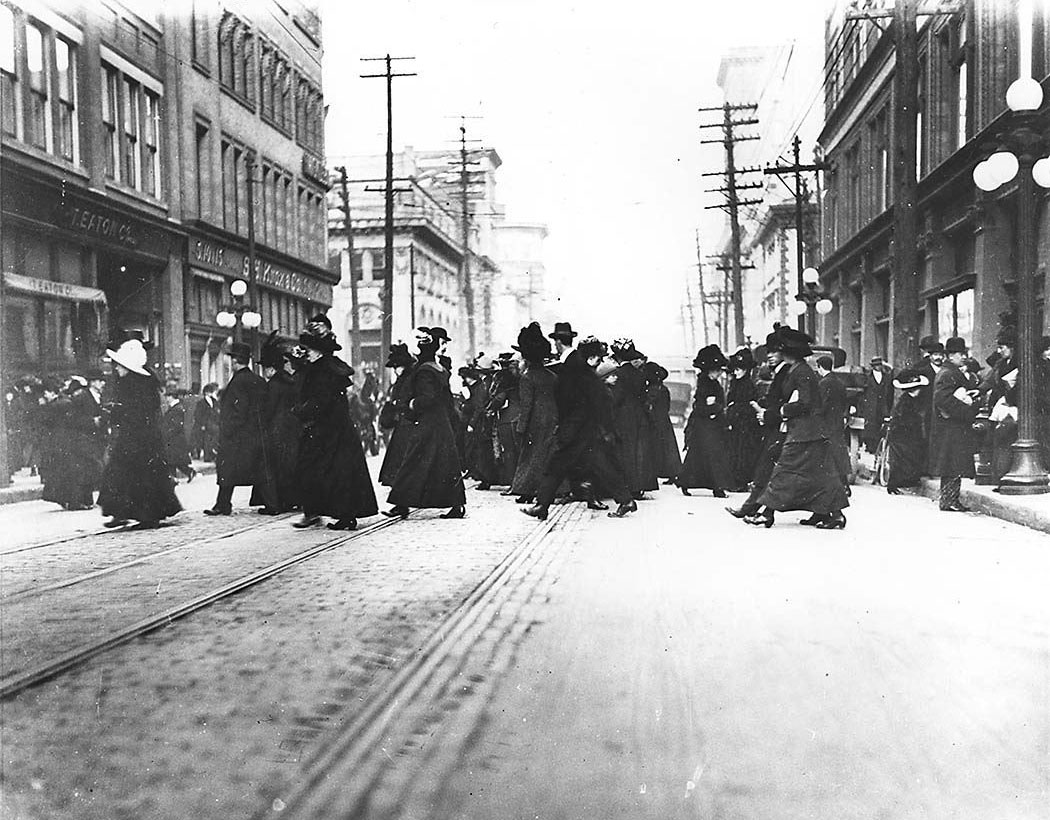
Shoppers crossing Queen Street West in 1910

Since the 19th century, Queen Street West at Yonge Street has been one of Toronto's primary shopping destinations. Originally, the Eaton's and Simpson's department stores faced each other across Queen Street, with the rivalry between the two stores at one time as central to Toronto retailing as the Macy's/Gimbel's competition was to New York City's retail history. The pedestrian crosswalk on Queen Street, just to the west of the intersection with Yonge Street, was for years one of the busiest in Canada, as thousands of shoppers a day comparison shopped between Eaton's and Simpson's.

Today, Eaton's is gone, but the Toronto Eaton Centre still remains at the same location, one of Canada's largest office and shopping complexes. Simpson's is also gone, but the historic department store building remains on the south side of Queen Street, occupied by the Hudson's Bay and Saks Fifth Avenue stores.

Further west, this stretch of Queen Street is dominated by institutional and cultural buildings such as Old City Hall, Toronto City Hall, Osgoode Hall and the Four Seasons Centre.

=== University to Spadina: Queen West ===
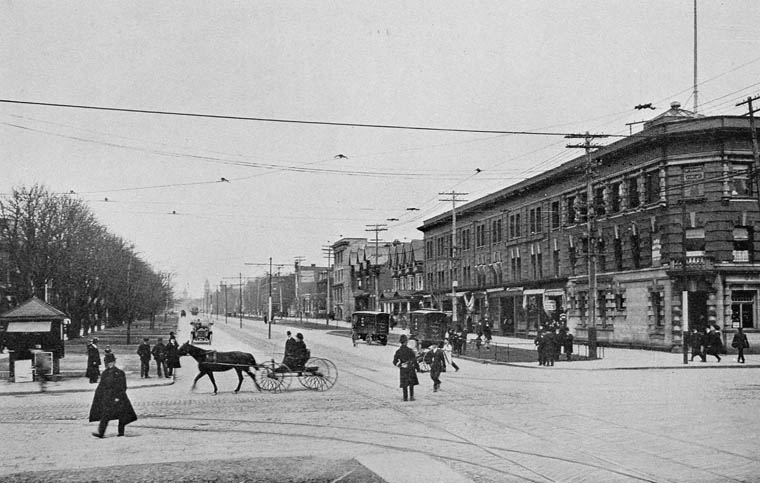
The intersection of Queen Street and Spadina Avenue in 1909

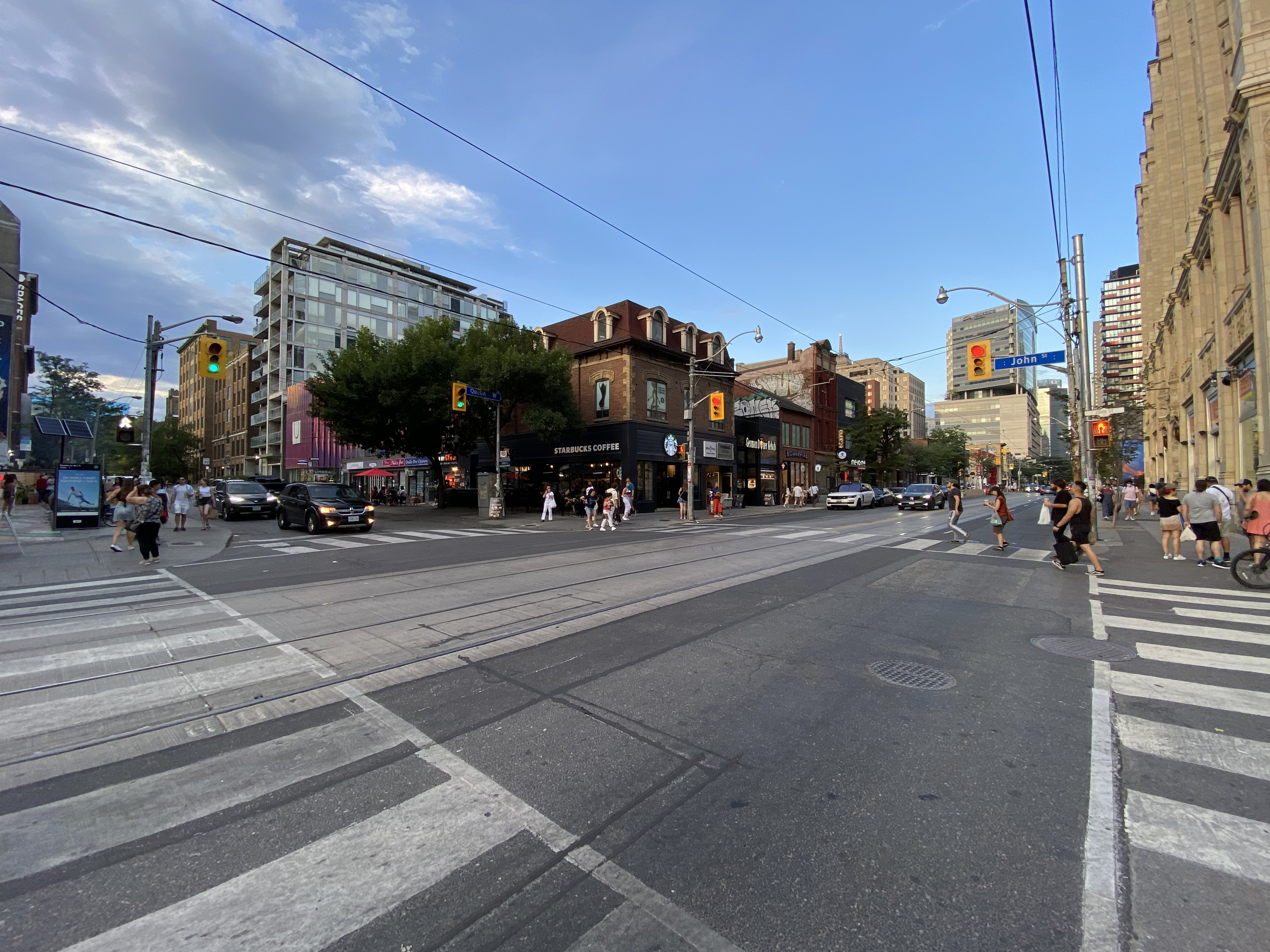
Queen Street West at John Street

The area between University and Spadina Avenues was a cultural nexus in the 1980s known for its cheap restaurants, clubs, eclectic mix of musicians and artists and was a haven for the punk rock scene with its famous club kids such as Kinga, Seika, Wanda and a host of others. In the 1960s and into the early 1980s, this stretch of Queen Street West was an aging commercial strip, known for "greasy spoon" restaurants and inexpensive housing in the area. In the late 1970s and 1980s, the area was transformed by local students, including those of the nearby Ontario College of Art & Design, and the area developed an active music scene which was one of the dominant centres of Canadian music in its era.

The late 1980s saw the relocation of CityTV to 299 Queen Street West. A more mainstream culture soon attracted other artists, wider audiences, and wealthier businesses to the area. Small independent businesses started to move further west on Queen Street West past Spadina Avenue and Bathurst Street for the cheaper rent. The push continued into the mid- and late 2000s and into Parkdale until that area also became associated with trendy businesses, and now condos.

By the mid-1990s, many mid- and higher-end international chain stores such as H&M and Zara began to open in the area. In contrast, original businesses such as the Cameron, the Horseshoe Tavern and The Rivoli have remained and changed little.

The broadcast hub at 299 Queen Street West (formerly called the CHUM-City Building), housing a number of Bell Media's television operations, is located at the corner of Queen and John Streets in this area. By the mid-1990s MuchMusic become associated with Queen Street's culture; the station's VJs have often broadcast their segments live from outside the building, and programs such as Electric Circus and the MuchMusic Video Awards have regularly taken place on the street.

St. Patrick's Market, at 238 Queen Street West, was founded in the late 1830s. The current building dates from 1912. This property is currently home to a communal food market, currently undergoing renovations the property is slated to re-open in 2018.

=== Spadina to Trinity Bellwoods Park ===
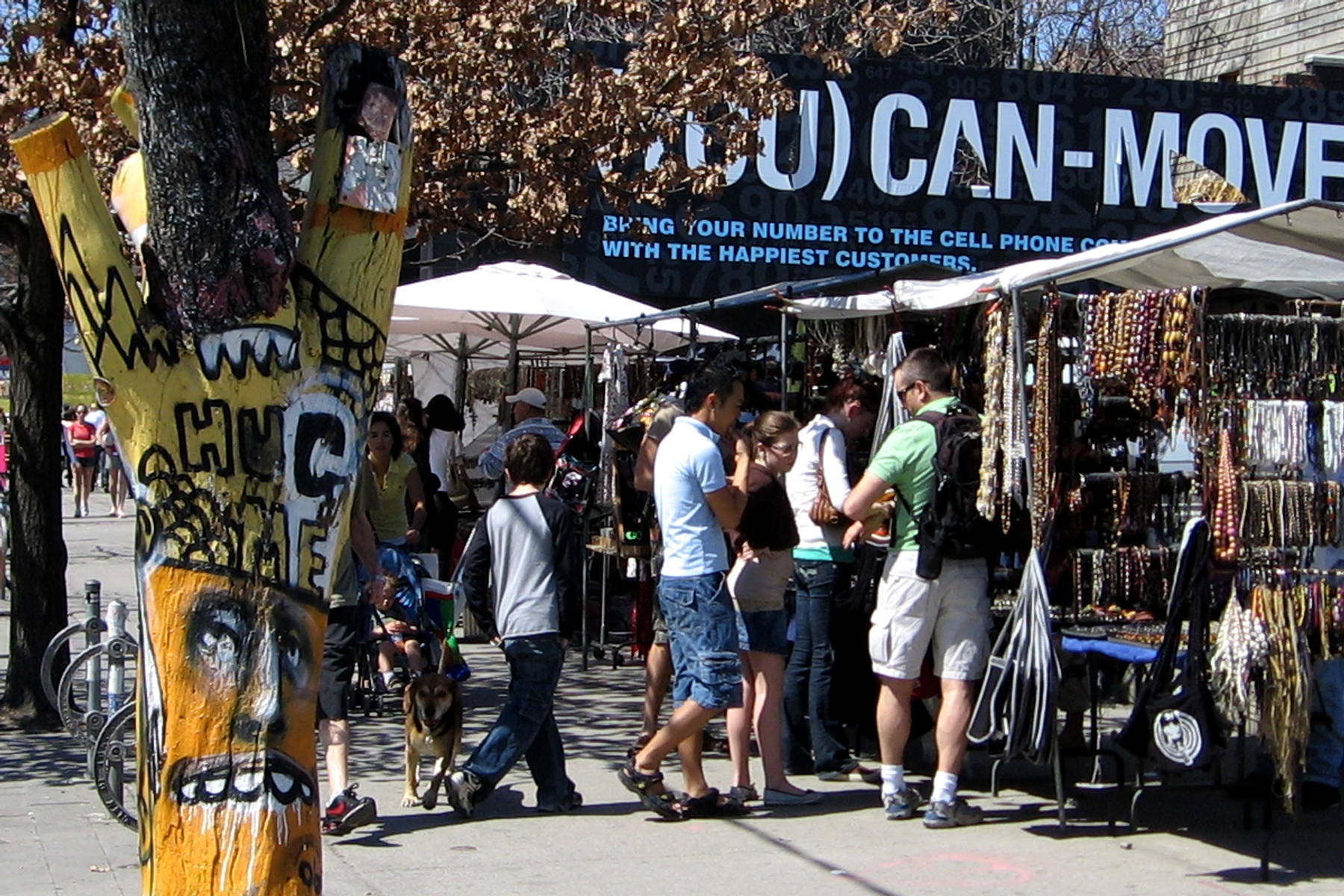
Street merchants on Queen West

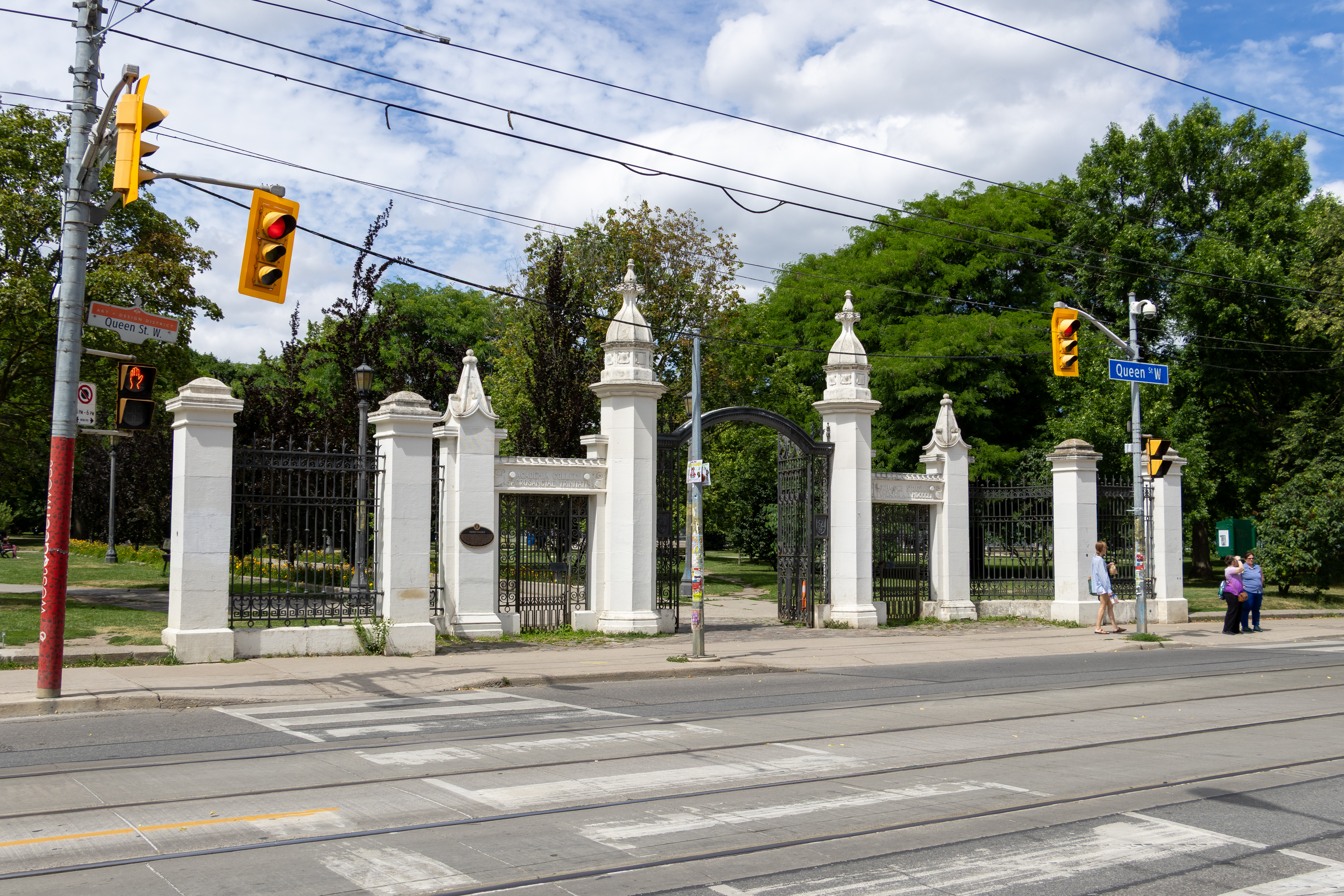
The gates to Trinity Bellwoods Park along Queen Street West

From Spadina to Bathurst, Queen Street is lined with street-level retail, with upper level apartments. Bates and Dodds, Toronto's oldest operating funeral home is at 931 Queen St. West, across from Trinity Bellwoods Park and has been in the same location since 1884. As rents rose, most artists began moving westward to this section of Queen. In the early 1990s, the newly vogue area became associated with nightclubs such as the Bovine Sex Club and several antique shops.

Occupying the same area, between Spadina Avenue and Trinity Bellwoods Park south of Queen Street, is Toronto's Fashion District. In the later 1990s, high-priced clothing stores opened in the same area as the gentrification of the district continued. In the 2000s, the changing character of Queen Street West gave rise to concerns in some quarters over the pace and implications of gentrification.

On February 20, 2008, a large fire destroyed several buildings on the south side of the street, between Bathurst and Portland Streets. The block had been declared a heritage conservation district by the city only the year before. Toronto Fire Services' "active incidents" website reported the fire as six-alarm intensity, with over 14 separate units dispatched to the scene throughout the day. Several neighbourhood businesses and apartments were destroyed in the blaze. In some cases, the destruction caused by the fire gave rise to additional angst over the changing character of Queen Street West and the potential nature of the new development that would eventually replace the burned buildings.

=== Bathurst to Dufferin: West Queen West ===
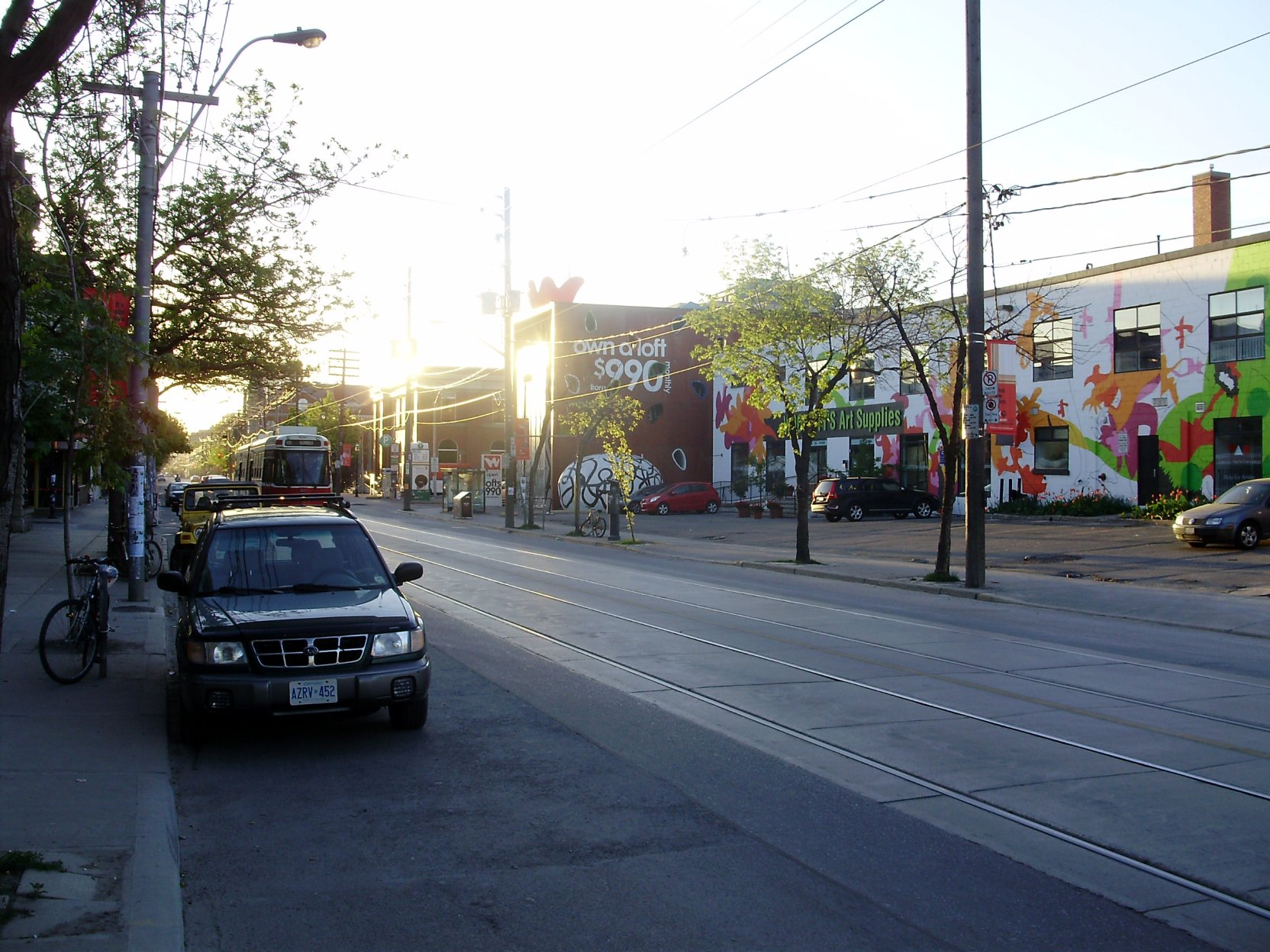
An early-morning street scene in the Gallery District as a 501 Queen streetcar bound for the Humber Loop approaches

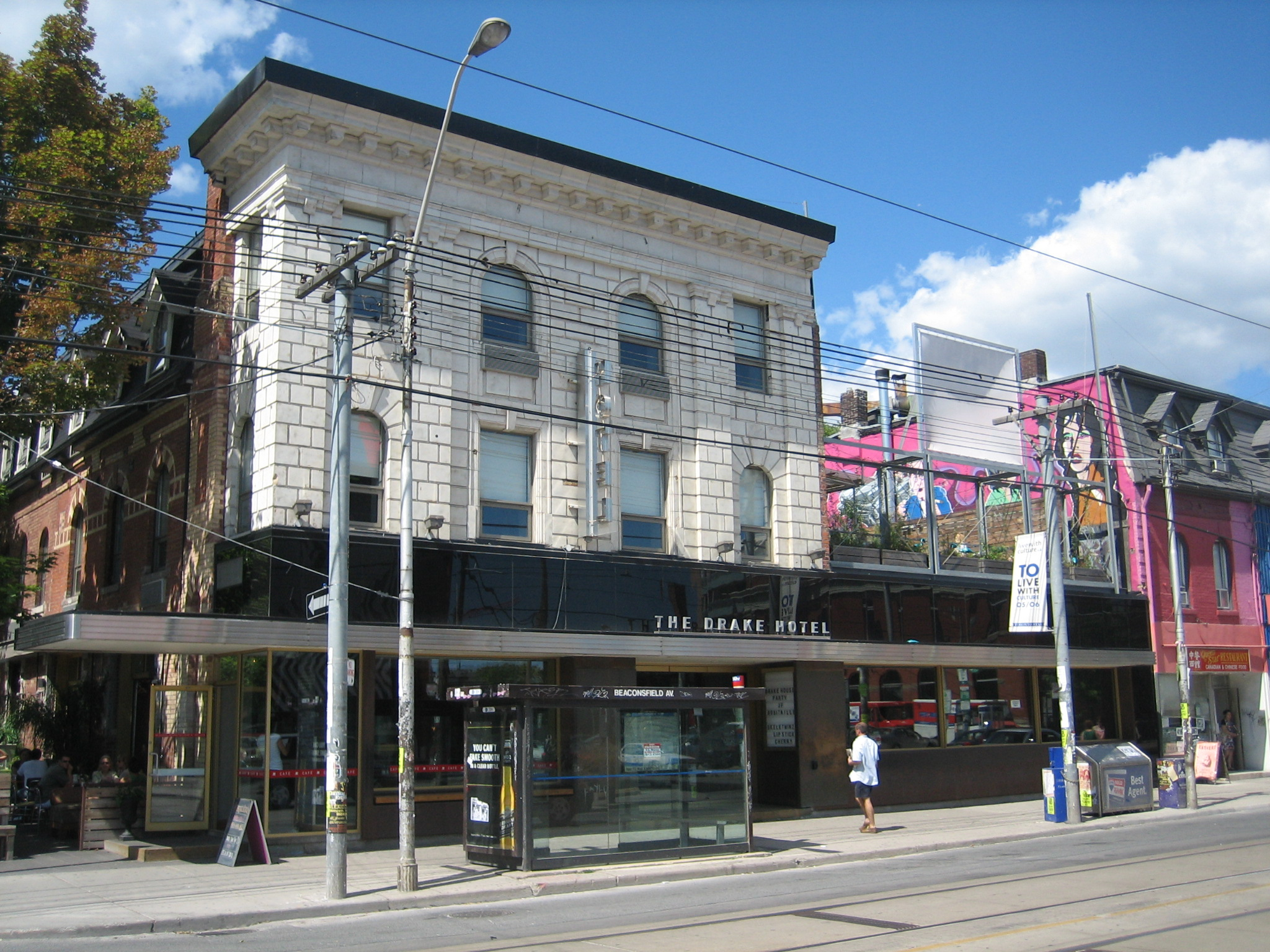
The Drake Hotel, a symbol of the area's gentrification

Between Bathurst Street and Gladstone Avenue is West Queen West, also known as the Art and Design District. For this two-kilometer stretch, nearly every storefront on the north side is either a gallery, bar, or nightclub (the south side of the street is largely taken up by the buildings and grounds of the former Queen Street Mental Health Centre, now part of CAMH), a combination that has led to the district being named one of the coolest neighborhoods in the world both in 2015 and 2016. The Stephen Bulger Gallery, founded in 1994, is also located on Queen West, as was the Museum of Contemporary Canadian Art (MOCCA), which relocated to the area in 2005.

MOCCA moved out of the area in 2018. In 2013, the developer Urbancorp applied to demolish the MOCCA and the adjacent buildings housing the Edward Day and Clint Roenisch Gallery and replace them with the nine-story "MOCCA Condo". The museum moved to a former factory building on Sterling Road north of Dundas Street West.

In 2014, Vogue Magazine ranked the neighborhood second in their compilation of the world's top 15 hippest neighborhoods, second only by Shimokitazawa, Tokyo.

Another cause of this gallery conglomeration was the conversion of a former police building (Art-Deco building for Metro Toronto Police 6 Division built in 1931 and closed in the 1990s) into Gallery 1313, with extensive financial assistance by the city. A large amount of gallery space, including such galleries as Loop and Fly, allowed Toronto artists of all levels of ability to show their work at a low cost. Unlike the boutique-oriented storefronts of the eastern portion of the street, the Gallery District contains an abundance of space available for special events. The Camera Bar—originally established by film director and producer Atom Egoyan—is now operated by the Stephen Bulger Gallery as a rental space that offers a bar and film/video screening venue.

West Queen West has undergone rapid transformation in the past couple of years. Rents have increased dramatically and many galleries have left. Recent departures include Sis Boom Bah, Luft Gallery, Burston Gallery and Brackett Gallery. At the same time as galleries have closed, many new bars have opened. Many attribute this sudden shift to the development spearheaded by the Drake Hotel, a former flophouse recently renovated and converted to a boutique hotel at a cost of $6 million.

The Gladstone Hotel is one of a few pre-existing businesses in the area that has been able to capitalize on the recent boom. This grand old railroad-era hotel had over the years fallen into disrepair and maintained itself by renting boarding-house-style accommodation. Now gentrified, the tavern on the first floor is home to a weekly "Art Bar", where locals from the arts community converge to socialize. In 2005, it underwent a major renovation spearheaded by the Zeidler family.

In 2013, Artscape Youngplace opened at 180 Shaw Street, just north of Queen Street West, after a major renovation and community consultation process. Artscape's $17 million transformation of the building, the former Shaw Street School, was completed just before the centenary of its construction in 1914. Artscape Youngplace is a 75,000 sq. ft. centre for creative collaboration housing a diverse mix of creators working in a variety of disciplines, as well as arts, community and social mission organizations.

The Queen West Art Crawl (QWAC) is an annual three-day festival celebrating the arts on Queen Street West and featuring the artists, arts organizations and businesses on the thoroughfare. It is produced by the not-for-profit Parkdale Liberty Economic Development Corporation.

The area between Trinity Bellwoods Park and Roncesvalles Avenue has been referred to as "Queer West" or "Queer Street West", an LGBTQ enclave in Toronto similar to the Church-Wellesley Village. The community started to form in the 1970s thanks to the General Idea artistic collective and their contributions to FILE Megazine. In the 1980s, the Operation Soap police raids affected some of the gay bathhouses in the community like The Barracks. As the area developed in the early 2000s, plans for condo expansions stirred gentrification concerns, leading to local "queer kiss-in" protests. Over the years, the area has been home to various LGBTQ-friendly bars, restaurants, stores, and venues. The Queer West community suffered several closures as a result of the COVID-19 pandemic.

==== West Queen West BIA ====
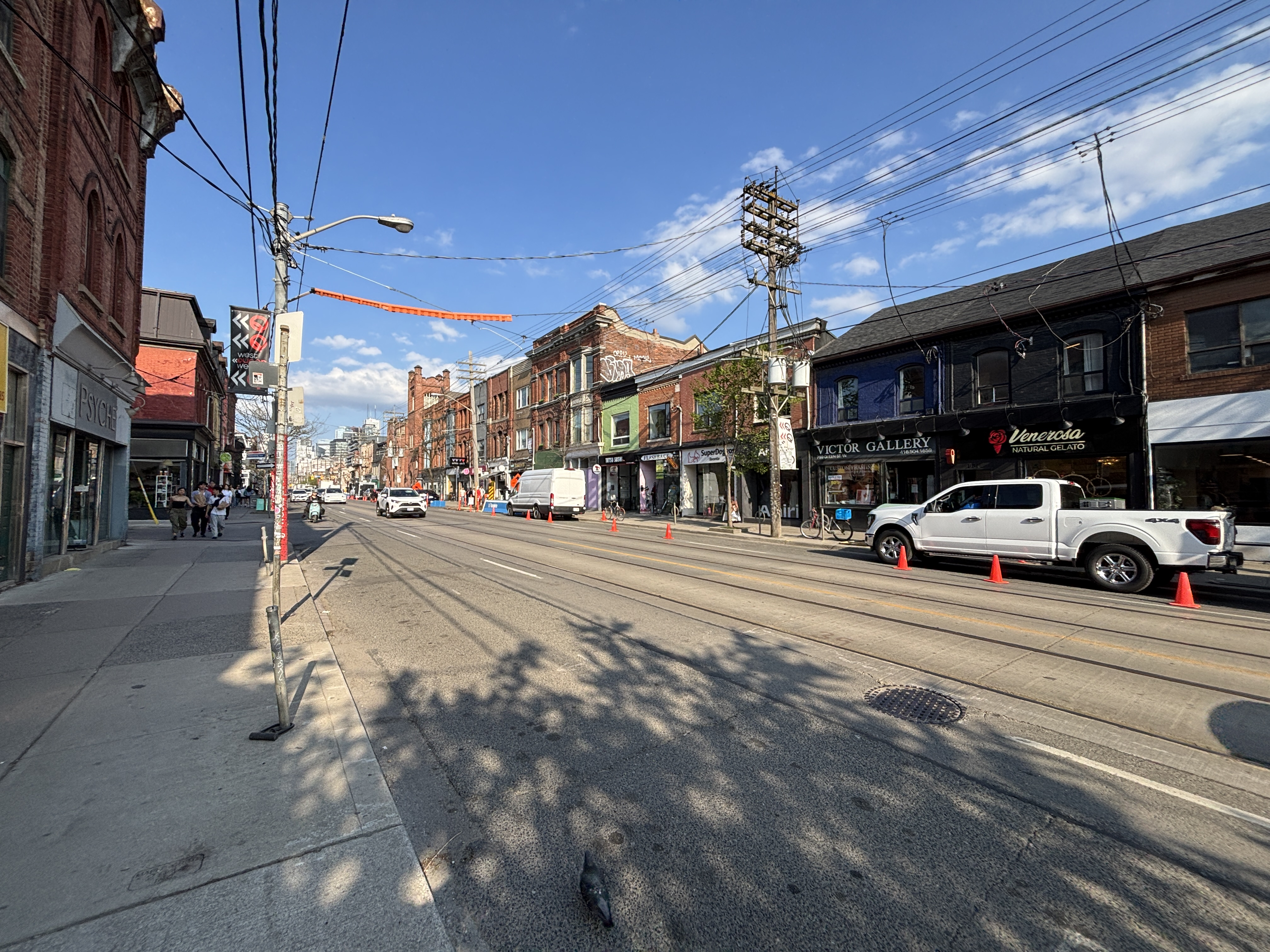
West Queen West BIA

The businesses on the stretch of Queen West from Bathurst to Gladstone Ave. have organized the West Queen West Business Improvement Area, which is mandated to undertake streetscape improvement projects, organize community events and promote the neighbourhood's unique commercial establishments.

Its vision is to retain the unique character of the West Queen West business community in the midst of renewal and growth, while attracting visitors/tourists to an area known to boast high concentrations of art and culture. The BIA promotes the West Queen West neighbourhood as a distinct destination for residents and tourists.

=== Dufferin to Roncesvalles: Parkdale ===
Until November 2010, Dufferin and Queen was a two-legged intersection broken up by the Queen Street subway (a historic CN railway bridge underpass first built in 1898) in the 1200 block, but due to major re-construction, this is now a four-way intersection. Once past there, Queen Street West makes its way through Parkdale. Parkdale is one of Toronto's oldest neighbourhoods, and a former independent village, and Queen Street is its main commercial strip, with two and three-storey mixed use buildings, retail on the ground-floor and residences above. Many of the buildings date to the 1880s era when Parkdale was an independent village.

There are numerous bars and restaurants along this section. There is also an increasing number of storefront art galleries, part of an increasing number of artists locating in the area. The lane way parallel to Queen on the south side is decorated with murals, and is nicknamed the 'Milky Way.' There is a business improvement association in this area, grouping businesses in the area under the 'Parkdale Village' banner. The Parkdale Library is located at Cowan Avenue, and Masaryk-Cowan Community Centre is located just south of Queen Street on Cowan. Parkdale has a higher proportion of lower-income residents and there are several support agencies located along Queen.

== Public transit ==
=== 501/301 Queen ===
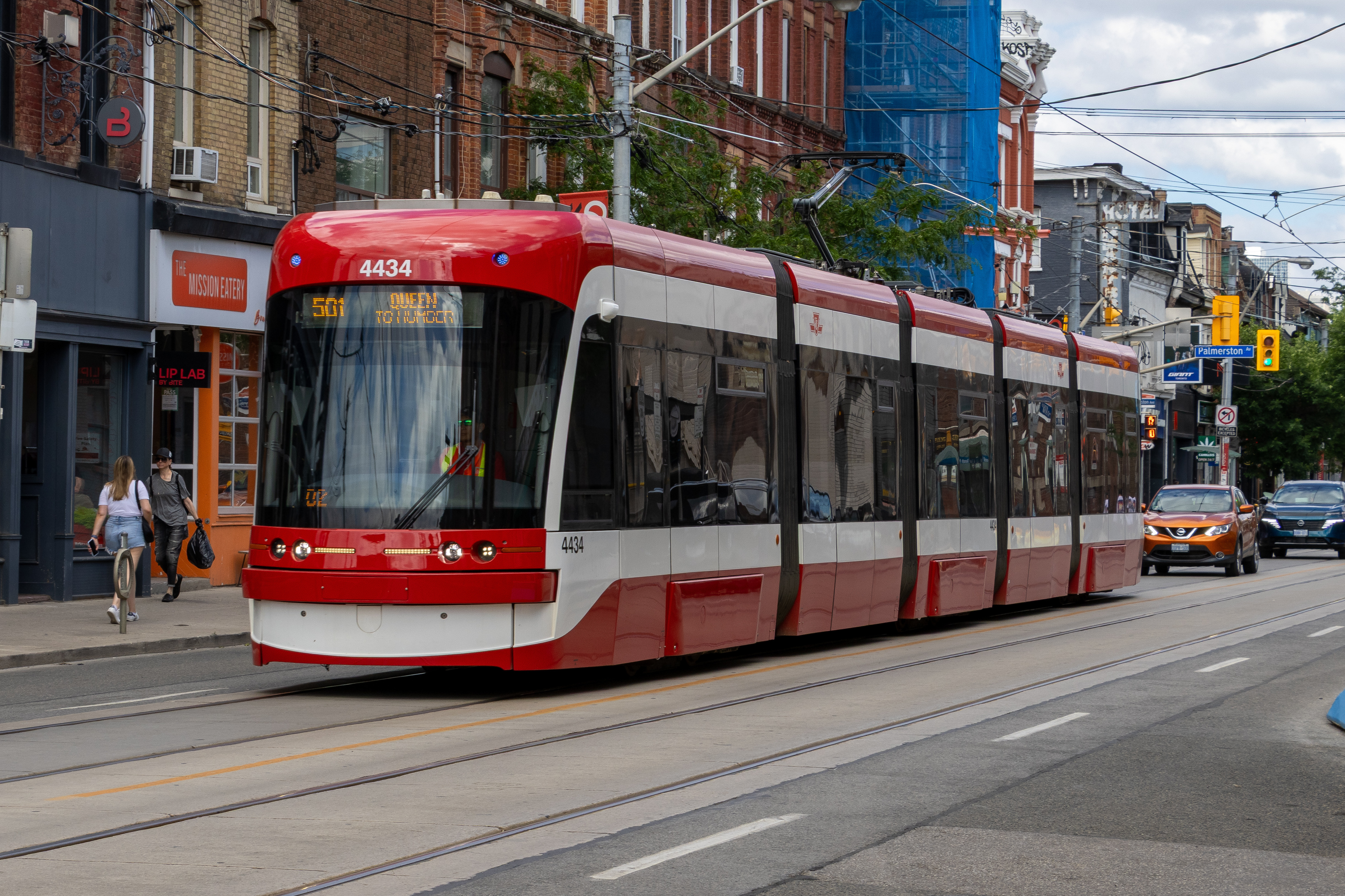
A 501 Queen Bombardier streetcar along Queen Street West in Trinity-Bellwoods

The 501 Queen is an east–west Toronto Transit Commission (TTC) streetcar route, running on Queen Street. The 501 Queen streetcar remains one of the TTC's busiest and longest streetcar routes; it runs every six minutes in each direction (traffic permitting). Queen Street West is also served by Osgoode station at University Avenue. Service is provided 24 hours a day, though overnight service between 1 am and 5 am is operated as one of three streetcar routes on the TTC's Blue Night Network under the route number 301 Queen, with less frequent service.

=== Cancelled and future rapid transit ===
==== Queen Street subway ====
Beneath Queen Street West is a little-known urban artifact. In the 1940s, the Toronto Transit Commission proposed to construct, in addition to a rapid-transit subway under Yonge Street, a second tunnel under Queen Street that would allow the PCC streetcars from certain routes to avoid other traffic as they ran through central areas. The Queen subway would run from Trinity Bellwoods Park in the west to Broadview Avenue in the east. This two-line plan was approved by referendum in 1946, but when hoped-for funding from the government of Canada did not materialize, the Queen line was postponed. In the 1960s, the TTC decided that a subway to replace the crowded Bloor Street streetcars would be more valuable, as after the construction of the Yonge line most of the passenger traffic had moved north with the subway. While the Queen line remained on the list of proposals into the 1970s, it was never again a priority.

When the Yonge subway was being constructed in the early 1950s, the shell of an east–west station for the Queen line, sometimes called Lower Queen, was built under its Queen station, and passenger flows within the station were laid out on the assumption that it would eventually be an interchange. In the 1990s, some of the space was reused for a pedestrian passage when the subway station was being made wheelchair-accessible, but the rest of the station shell remains empty to this day.

==== Ontario Line ====
The Ontario Line is an under-construction subway line that will have a section running below Queen from Spadina Avenue to Parliament Street, connecting to the Line 1 Yonge-University at Osgoode and Queen stations while also serving three other stations on Queen Street, with two; Chinatown (one stop west of Osgoode station) and Moss Park (one stop east of Queen station), located along this stretch, with a third, Leslieville (three stops east of Moss Park station), located at the Lakeshore East and Stouffville GO Transit lines at a point east of where the line will cross Queen after dipping southwards.

== See also ==
- Royal eponyms in Canada
- Queen West Art Crawl
- Secret Swing
