= List of songs about Toronto =

This is a list of songs about Toronto, Ontario, Canada, set there, named after a location, feature of the city, or mentions of the city.

== 0-9 ==
- "416/905 (T.O. Party Anthem)" by Maestro Fresh Wes
- "10 Bands" by Drake
- "6 Man" by Drake
- "6 God" by Drake
- "5am in Toronto" by Drake
- 502 Come Up by Bryson Tiller

== A ==
- "Alberta Bound" by Gordon Lightfoot
- "All Me" by Drake ft 2 Chainz and Big Sean
- "Ambulance Blues" by Neil Young
- "AquaCityBoy" by k-os
- "Aquamarine Blue" by The Sympathy
- "At the Roncies" (Toronto's Roncesvalles Avenue) by Jully Black
- "Augusta" by Kurt Swinghammer

== B ==
- "Back to Back" by Drake
- "Backyard" by The Good Lovelies
- "BaKardi Slang" by Kardinal Offishall
- "Ballade à Toronto" by Jean Leloup
- "Bartlett Street" by Kurt Swinghammer
- "Bathurst Flat" by Kurt Swinghammer
- "Better Days" by The Jayhawks
- "betterman" by Virginia To Vegas
- "Beverley Street" by Blue Rodeo
- "Black Ice" by Ohbijou
- "Bleed a Little While Tonight" by The Lowest of the Low
- "Bless This City" by Sunparlour Players
- "Blue Jay Season" by Tory Lanez
- "Bobcaygeon" by the Tragically Hip
- "Body" by Loud Luxury
- "Break From Toronto" by PartyNextDoor
- "Browns Line" by The Johnny Max Band
- "Bud the Spud" by Stompin' Tom Connors
- "Buried Alive Interlude" by Drake ft. Kendrick Lamar

== C ==
- "Call My Name" by Prince
- "Cherry Beach" by Career Suicide
- "Cherry Beach Express" by Pukka Orchestra
- "Church Bells Ringing (Christmas in the City) by Skydiggers
- "Christmastime in Toronto" by Gord Downie
- "Civic Kiss" by Kurt Swinghammer
- "Closing Time" by Leonard Cohen
- "Cold, Cold Toronto" by Trooper
- "Coldest Night of the Year" by Bruce Cockburn
- "Cold Steel Hammer" by Big Rude Jake
- "CN Tower" by Michaele Jordana and the Poles
- "Concrete Heart" by Great Lake Swimmers
- "Crabbuckit" by k-os
- "Can't Believe it" by T-Pain feat. Lil Wayne
- "City Is Mine" by Drake
- "Christmastime In Toronto" by Gordon Downie

== D ==
- "Dope Fiends and Boozehounds" by the Rheostatics
- "Down by the Henry Moore" by Murray McLauchlan
- "Do The Slither" by Pukka Orchestra
- "Don’t Run" by PARTYNEXTDOOR
- "DVP" by PUP

== F ==
- "Fancy" by Drake, from Thank Me Later 2010
- "Flypaper" by k-os
- "Fam Jam" by Shad
- "Forests and Sand" by Camera Obscura

== G ==
- "Get Dark" by The Zolas
- "Get Ready" by Shawn Desman
- "Greatlakescape" by The Ghost Is Dancing

== H ==
- "Haig Earl" by Shadowy Men on a Shadowy Planet
- "Hang on to Your Resistance" by Tom Cochrane
- "Hard Deep Junction Blues" by Big Rude Jake
- "Henry Rollins Is No Fun" by Chixdiggit
- "Home" by MONOWHALES
- "Home" by Rusty
- "HOMESICK" by MICO
- "Home Sweet Home" by Ron Hawkins and the Do Good Assassins
- "Honky Tonk (Toronto)" by Rae Spoon
- "Horseshoe Bay" by Skydiggers
- "Hello Brooklyn" by All Time Low

== I ==
- "I Don't Want to Go to Toronto" by Radio Free Vestibule
- "I've Been Everywhere" by Hank Snow
- "Illustrating Man" by Kurt Swinghammer
- "I Will Never See the Sun" by Great Lake Swimmers
- "If I Can’t Have You" by Shawn Mendes
- "In The Tdot" by Aspektz
- "Intentions" by Justin Bieber
- "IVIVI" by Lilly Singh (AKA IISuperwomanII) and Humble The Poet

== J ==
- "Jack Layton And Grace Appleton" by Kurt Swinghammer
- "Just About "The Only" Blues" by The Lowest of the Low
- "Jane" by Barenaked Ladies
- "Jane Station" by The Ghost Is Dancing
- "Jimmy Fall Down" by Blue Rodeo

== K ==
- "King Edward Hotel" by Matt Paxton
- "Know Yourself" by Drake
- "King of the Fall" by The Weeknd

== L ==
- "La Villa Strangiato (An Exercise in Self-Indulgence) VII. Danforth and Pape" by Rush
- "Let's Ride" by Choclair
- "Lightfoot" by The Guess Who
- "Lilly Of The 401" by Kurt Swinghammer
- "Live from the Gutter" by Drake and Future

== M ==
- "Magpie" by Big Rude Jake
- "Margo's Cargo" by Stompin' Tom Connors
- "Might Not" by Belly and The Weeknd
- "Mr. Metro" by Devon
- "My Baby Loves a Bunch of Authors" by Moxy Früvous
- "Municipal Prick" by Fucked Up

== N ==
- "Name the Capital" by Stompin' Tom Connors
- "Neck Deep in the Blues" by Big Rude Jake
- "Neon City" by Rita MacNeil
- "Northern Touch" by Rascalz ft. Kardinal Offishall, Thrust, Checkmate, Choclair

== O ==
- ”On High Seas” by Gordon Lightfoot
- "Olympic Island" by The Diableros
- "On Yonge Street" by Gordon Lightfoot
- "Out Of Thin Air" by Kurt Swinghammer

== P ==
- "Paris Be Mine" by The Bicycles
- "Parkdale" by Elizabeth Sheppard
- "Parkdale" by Metric
- "Peace and Quiet" by Ron Hawkins
- "People City" by Gary Gray and Tommy Ambrose
- "Pink Floyd Dude" by Kurt Swinghammer

== Q ==
- "Quarantine" by Career Suicide
- "Queen Jane" by Barzin

== S ==
- "Salesmen, Cheats and Liars" by The Lowest of the Low
- "Scarborough Girl" by Kobo Town ft. Calypso Rose
- "Skyline" by Broken Social Scene
- "Sleeping In Toronto" by Jim Bryson
- "SnowTime" by James Taylor
- "Something to Believe In" by The Lowest of the Low
- "Spadina Bus" by The Shuffle Demons
- "Spadina Expressway" by Dan Bryk
- "Started from the Bottom" by Drake
- "Streets of Toronto" by Stompin' Tom Connors
- "Summer Sixteen" by Drake
- "Sweeterman" by Zach Farache

== T ==
- "Tell Your Friends" by The Weeknd
- "That Song About Trees & Kites" by The Lowest of the Low
- "The Anthem" by Kardinal Offishall
- "The CN Tower Belongs to the Dead" by Final Fantasy
- "The Embassy (223 Augusta)" by Henri Fabergé and the Adorables
- "The King of Spain" by Moxy Früvous
- "The Light That Guides You Home" by Jim Cuddy
- "The Old Apartment" by Barenaked Ladies
- "The Signature Of Marilyn Churley" by Kurt Swinghammer
- "The Toronto Song" ("Toronto Sucks") by Three Dead Trolls in a Baggie
- "The Troubadour's Song" by Stephen Stanley
- "This Beat Goes On/Switchin' to Glide" by The Kings
- "This Lamb Sells Condos" by Final Fantasy
- "To It and At It" by Stompin' Tom Connors
- "Tony Montana" by Future Feat. Drake
- "Toronto" by Lenny Breau
- "Toronto (Unabridged)" by Silverstein
- "Toronto Sucks" by Three Dead Trolls in a Baggie
- "Totally Untitled" by Kupek
- "Trinity Bellwoods" by Treble Charger
- "Toronto" by The Beatable
- "Toronto" by Tusks
- "Toronto #4" by The Tragically Hip
- “Toronto the Good” by The Brothers-in-Law
- "T.O. Gold" by Honey Cocaine
- "T.T.C. Skidaddler" by Stompin' Tom Connors

== U ==
- "Uber Everywhere" by MadeinTYO
- "Under the Carlaw Bridge" by The Lowest of the Low
- "Under the Mynah Bird" by Stephen Stanley

== V ==
- "Vienna Calling" by Falco

== W ==
- ”Waiting For The Streetcar” by Edith
- "Wayward and Parliament" by Amy Millan
- "Weston Road Flows" by Drake
- "Western Skies" by Blue Rodeo
- "What Have You Got To Do (To Get Off Tonight)" by Red Rider
- “Where U Goin" by Arkells
- "Where Ya At" by Drake and Future

== Y ==
- "You & the 6" by Drake
- "YYZ" by Rush

== Songs with videos of Toronto ==
These songs, while not having Toronto in their names, lyrics, or in content, have, as their (promotional) videos, scenes of Toronto.

- 50 Cent || "God Gave Me Style"
- Alessia Cara || "Scars to Your Beautiful" || 2016
- Anna Cyzon || "Young Boy"
- Anne Murray || "Now And Forever"
- Big Shaq || "Mans Not Hot"
- Addictiv || "Over It (Cry Baby)"
- Anvil || "Mad Dog"
- Austra || "Beat And The Pulse"
- Barenaked Ladies || "Enid"
- Barenaked Ladies || "Lovers In A Dangerous Time"
- Barenaked Ladies || "The Old Apartment"
- Big Wreck || "That Song"
- The Boomtang Boys and Kim Esty || "Pictures"
- Boys Brigade || "Melody"
- Boys Brigade || "The Passion Of Love"
- Brendan Canning || "Love Is New"
- Cancer Bats || "French Immersion"
- Celine Dion || "You And I"
- Chantal Kreviazuk || "Dear Life"
- Corey Hart || "Never Surrender"
- Chalk Circle || "April Fool"
- Clipse || "Ma, I Don't Love Her"
- Cowboy Junkies || "Sun Comes Up Its Tuesday Morning"
- The Cranberries || "Animal Instinct"
- Damhnait Doyle || "Tattooed"
- Damhnait Doyle || "Traffic"
- Deadmau5 || "Ghosts 'n' Stuff" |
- Default || "Wasting My Time"
- Delerium feat. Leigh Nash || "Innocente (Falling In Love)"
- Drake || "Headlines" from Take Care (album)
- Donnell Jones || "Where I Wanna Be"
- Duran Duran || "The Reflex"
- Econoline Crush || "You Don't Know What It's Like"
- The Ennis Sisters || "It's Not About You"
- Esthero || "That Girl"
- Feist || "1234"
- Finger Eleven || "Drag You Down"
- Glass Tiger || "Someday"
- Haywire || "Bad Boy"
- Haywire || "Dance Desire"
- Honeymoon Suite || "New Girl Now"
- Howie Day || "Collide"
- Hilary Duff and Haylie Duff || "Our Lips Are Sealed"
- Hilary Duff || "Play With Fire"
- Hilary Duff || "Wake Up"
- Jorane featuring Daniel Lanois || "Pour ton sourire"
- JB feat. Nicole Wray and Quinn Mayback || "Good in the Hood"
- The Johnstones || "Gone For A Long Time"
- Jane Siberry || "Mimi on the Beach"
- k-os || "Crabbuckit"
- Kardinal Offishall || "Bakardi Slang"
- Kelly Clarkson || "Behind These Hazel Eyes"
- Kelly Clarkson || "Already Gone"
- Kim Mitchell || "All We All"
- Lady Antebellum || "Need You Now"
- Len || "It's My Neighbourhood"
- Lights || "Toes"
- Lisa Lougheed || "Run With Us"
- Love Inc. || "Broken Bones"
- Maestro Fresh Wes || "Let Your Backbone Slide"
- Marilyn Manson || "The Beautiful People"
- Martha And The Muffins || "Danseparc (Every Day It's Tomorrow)"
- Martha And The Muffins || "Echo Beach"
- Edward Maya and Mia Martina || "Stereo Love"
- Melanie C || "Understand"
- Melanie Doane || "Happy Homemaker"
- The Moffatts || "Misery"
- Mudvayne || "Forget to Remember"
- Mýa || "Fallen"
- Organized Rhyme || "Check the O.R."
- Paul Brandt || "That's The Truth"
- P Reign || "We Them Niggaz"
- Paint || "Boomerang"
- Parachute Club || "Rise Up"
- The Partland Brothers || "Set It Off"
- Peaches || "Set It Off"
- Platinum Blonde || "Not In Love"
- Play || "Us Against The World"
- Pukka Orchestra || "Listen To The Radio"
- The Pursuit Of Happiness || "I'm An Adult Now"
- Rush || "Subdivisions
- Sasha || "If You Believe"
- The Shuffle Demons || "Spadina Bus"
- Simple Plan || "Jet Lag"
- Roni Size || "Brown Paper Bag"
- Shawn Mendes || "Life Of The Party"
- Snow || "Everybody Wants To Be Like You"
- Snow || "Informer"
- Snow || "Plum Song"
- The Spoons || "Romantic Traffic"
- The Spoons || "You Light Up"
- Tate McRae || "You Broke Me First"
- The Tea Party || "Free"
- Tears For Fears || "Head Over Heels"
- Thirty Seconds to Mars || "The Kill"
- The Tragically Hip || "Little Bones"
- Trans-X || "Message On The Radio"
- The Trews || "Hope & Ruin"
- The Used || "Take It Away"
- The Used || "The Bird And The Worm"
- Wale || "Simple Man"
- The Weeknd || "Pretty"
- The Weeknd || "Secrets" on Starboy (album)
- The Weeknd || "Wicked Games"
