= Do the Right Now =

Do The Right Now

Studio album by The Lowest of the Low
- Released: September 8, 2017
- Recorded: 2017
- Studio: Revolution Recording
- Genre: Indie rock
- Length: 43:33
- Label: Pheromone Recordings
- Producer: Ron Hawkins and Joe Dunphy

The Lowest of the Low chronology
Sordid Fiction (2004)	Do The Right Now (2017)	Agitpop (album) (2019)

Do The Right Now is the fourth studio album by Canadian rock band, The Lowest of the Low.

== Album Concept ==
Discussions for this album were incepted in 2011, but these plans were scrapped in 2013 when original guitarist (Stephen Stanley) announced he was leaving the band. Lead singer Ron Hawkins said, shortly after his departure, that the future of the band was very much in doubt. "The Low is in a 'dust settling' phase right now. Stephen leaving was a surprise and no one in the band is quite certain as to why he left. We're not clear as to whether or not a Lowest of the Low with a new guitarist makes sense." In 2015, the plans became clearer as Brian MacMillan took over lead guitar duties and two new singles 'The Kids Are All Wrong' and 'In The Blink Of An Eye' were released. These singles indicated that the band was very much alive and the new album arrived two years later. There were more lineup changes by the time the new record came along. MacMillian was replaced by Michael McKenzie (formerly of Universal Honey) and Dylan Parker, who had replaced original bassist John Arnott on the previous album was now gone with Derrick Brady in his place. Brady has a long history with Hawkins having played in two of his other bands, The Rusty Nails and The Do Good Assassins.

Despite his exit, Parker gets credit for the germ of the idea that inspired the record when he suggested "what about something kind of like a 'Shakespeare My Butt 2.0?' Hawkins embraced the idea and went to work writing new material. "The feeling that I might be writing a spiritual successor to 'Shakespeare' was very much alive while I wrote 'Do The Right Now.' I liked the idea of 52-year old me having a conversation with 25-year old me." The album doesn't just feature Hawkins re-examining the 'Shakespeare' era as a songwriter, it actually features two songs that didn't make the cut back in 1991 when that record was released. "Something to Believe In" and "Gerona Train" were both songs that were in the bands repertoire back then but they had never been recorded. "We were already playing them in (pre-Lowest of the Low band) Popular Front. We thought, 'That's old!' back then and the joke is we did them 25-years later." The omission of 'Gerona Train' from Shakespeare My Butt was something Hawkins regretted. "'Gerona Train' was about the Spanish Civil War. There are two songs on 'Shakespeare' about the Spanish Civil War so it was kind of meant to be a trilogy of songs but for whatever reason we decided to leave the third one off the album."

== Recording Process ==
The album was recorded at Revolution Recording in Toronto with co-owner Joe Dunphy serving as the records co-producer along with Hawkins. Not only was the material a throwback to the band's first album when it came to the writing process, but Hawkins feels that carried through into the studio as well. "There is a certain punky spirit to it, there is a certain kind of mixing of jangly rock and punk and folk music. There are the sort of journalistic lyric writing that I didn’t do as much of later, and those things in my mind really defines the Lowest of the Low. And there’s that ragged sense, because of the nature of the personalities of all the guys in the band, that the wheels might come of it at any time."

Two months before the album was set for release, the first single, "Powerlines" debuted. Hawkins felt the track established the retrospective tone of the new record. "The song 'Powerlines' is kind of central. It's the history of the band in three verses, with the final one about how you gotta go for it. The line “scrape your pretty practiced autograph in the windshield frost” is about how you can pose all you like about how you don't care if you make it, but at a certain point you need to just own it and admit that you've got a lot of things you wanna say, and you hope that people listen."

When the band signed a deal with Warner Music Canada in 2018, "Do The Right Now" was given a vinyl release as part of the box set "Shakespeare My Box!!"

== Critical reception ==
In a review by Gerrod Harris for Canadianbeats.ca he stated that "Do The Right Now may be one of the strongest alternative and indie records to come out this year and is more than worth checking out."

== Track listing ==
All tracks are written by Ron Hawkins.

No.	Title	Length
1.	"Powerlines"	3:41
2.	"Gerona Train"	4:19
3.	"Do the Right Now"	1:58
4.	"Saint Spurious"	3:41
5.	"Minuteman"	5:36
6.	"The Hard Way"	2:19
7.	"Something to Believe In"	4:11
8.	"Don't Let It Lay You Low"	3:06
9.	"Sister Jude"	2:34
10.	"Infinite"	4:29
11.	"Immortal"	3:09
12.	"California Gothic"	4:30
