= Sordid Fiction =

Studio album by The Lowest of the Low
- Released: September 21, 2004
- Recorded: 2004
- Genre: Indie rock
- Length: 42:38
- Label: MapleMusic Recordings
- Producer: Ian Blurton

The Lowest of the Low chronology
Nothing Short of a Bullet (2002)	Sordid Fiction (2004)	Do the Right Now (2017)

Professional ratings
Review scores
Source	Rating
NOW	3/5 stars

Sordid Fiction is an album by Canadian band The Lowest of the Low. For this record, and all future releases the band switched to Lowest of the Low, dropping "The" from their name. Apart from three studio songs on the band's 2002 live album Nothing Short of a Bullet, it was the band's first album of new material since 1994's Hallucigenia. This is the first Lowest of the Low recording not to feature original bassist John Arnott who left the band in 2002. The re-jigged lineup featured Dylan Parker replacing Arnott on bass and long time collaborator Lawrence Nichols (harmonica, keyboards and vocals) joining the band as a full-fledged member.

The album was produced by Ian Blurton, and released on MapleMusic Recordings. Hawkins had previously worked with Blurton when he produced the Ron Hawkins and the Rusty Nails album Greasing the Star Machine and valued Blurton's contributions so much he referred to him as "kind of like a sixth member" of the band during the recording of Sordid Fiction. The record was mixed by Adam Kasper (who had worked with Nirvana, The Foo Fighters and Weezer among many others) During the mixing of the track 'Dark Horse' the keyboard outro to the song was accidentally removed. The Low released the demo version on the album Thrifty Thrifty Thrifty (a collection of outtakes, rare tracks, demos and live songs that was part of the career-spanning box set Shakespeare My Box!!) and that version includes the omitted keyboard section.

After the excitement of the reunion shows died down, the band didn't want to be a "perpetual reunion act" and felt creatively ready to make new music. Hawkins explained the creative freedom the band had: "We went into making the record completely unhindered. We just made the record we wanted to make. On our own, with our own money. The great thing about it was Stephen had a solo project during that period of time as well, so he had done a lot more writing on his own then he had previously done with The Lowest of the Low and then I had the Rusty Nails, so we kind of had all these influences that we could bring in that were new... We weren't jettisoning our old Lowest of the Low sound, but there was all this other stuff we learned in the meantime put into the stew."

Exlaim Magazine gave it a positive review saying: "Sordid Fiction is a sharply constructed, contemporary folk-punk record that the bands fans will surely embrace." LiveVan.com said: "The songs on Sordid Fiction will resonate strongly with those familiar with the band. Tremendous force, melody and raw wit are displayed in abundance, and as always the lyrics serve as bullet-points for the state of the world, filled with salient, autobiographical observations on life, love and ill-timed comeuppances. This new CD marks the re-emergence of one of Canada’s finest bands as a forward-moving musical entity. Lowest of the Low is back."

Ultimately, the band was disappointed by the response to the album, and blamed their new label, Maple Music, for part of the problem. Hawkins explained: "We're quite proud of that record as well, but it slipped through the cracks. There were a few balls dropped with the distribution. You'd be touring out West and there'd be no records in the stores. You'd think "why are we here?" Steve Stanley echoes Hawkins in taking pride in the record, despite being "a bit disappointed" with the response: "It's a lot of work to do an album with a band like this and we were really proud of that record." Stanley exited the band in 2013, making this his final recording with The Lowest of the Low.

In 2018, the album was remastered for a vinyl release as part of the box set Shakespeare My Box!! In order to have similar running times for Side One and Side Two the track listing for the vinyl release was altered.

== Track listing ==
All songs written by Ron Hawkins, except where noted.

1. "Concave" – 3:07
2. "The Last Recidivist" – 2:45
3. "Everywhere and Nowhere" – 3:50
4. "...And Then the Riot" – 2:57
5. "Your Birthday Party" (Stephen Stanley)– 3:30
6. "Giulietta the Just" – 4:07
7. "Save Me, Alice Neel!" – 3:01
8. "The Sharpest Pain" (Stephen Stanley) – 3:20
9. "A Casual Overdose" – 4:12
10. "Darkhorse" – 4:45
11. "Winter Sleepers" – 4:18
12. "Sincero" – 2:46
