= Cycle of Contempt =

Studio album by Razor
- Released: September 23, 2022
- Recorded: December 2019 – December 2021
- Studios: Upper Hand Studio in Guelph, Ontario, Canada; H.M. Studio in Waterloo, Ontario, Canada
- Genre: Thrash metal
- Length: 43:00
- Label: Relapse Records
- Producer: Dave Carlo

Razor chronology
Decibels (1997)	Cycle of Contempt (2022)

Professional ratings
Review scores
Source	Rating
Blabbermouth.net	8.5/10
The Dark Melody	4.8/10
Dead Rhetoric	8/10
Metal Forces	8.5/10
Scream Blast Repeat	7/10

Cycle of Contempt is the ninth studio album by Canadian thrash metal band Razor, released on September 23, 2022. It is the band's first album in 25 years, since 1997's Decibels, and their first album with drummer Rider Johnson, as well as bassist Jon Armstrong since 1987's Custom Killing. "Flames of Hatred" was released in advance on the same day as the album's announcement.

== Track listing ==
No.	Title	Length
1.	"Flames of Hatred"	4:24
2.	"Jabroni"	3:10
3.	"Off My Meds"	2:54
4.	"A Bitter Pill"	2:47
5.	"Crossed"	3:17
6.	"First Rate Hate"	4:10
7.	"Cycle of Contempt"	5:28
8.	"Setup"	3:34
9.	"Punch Your Face In"	2:46
10.	"All Fist Fighting"	2:34
11.	"Darkness Falls"	3:12
12.	"King Shit"	4:44
Total length:		43:00

== Personnel ==
- Bob Reid – vocals
- Dave Carlo – guitars
- Mike Campagnolo – bass
- Rider Johnson – drums

=== Production ===
- Dave Carlo – producer, engineering
- Jonah Kay – engineering
- Brad Boatright – mastering
- Jacob Speis – layout
- Chris Piccinetti – photography
- Troy Bridgeman – photography
- Jan Yrlund – cover art
