= Change of Heart (band) =

Canadian alternative rock band

- Origin: Toronto, Ontario, Canada
- Genres: Alternative rock
- Years active: 1982–1997, 2009, 2012, 2017
- Label: Cargo Records
- Past members: Ian Blurton; Ron Duffy; Glenn Milchem; John Richardson; Rob Taylor; John Borra; Mike Armstrong; Bernard Maiezza; Rob Higgins

Change of Heart is a Canadian alternative rock band, active from 1982 to 1997. They had one Top 40 hit, "There You Go" in 1992, as well as several hits on Canada's modern rock charts, including "Trigger" and "Little Kingdoms".

The band had a diverse, genre-defying sound, with the songs on their albums crossing from pop to hard rock to something almost akin to punk.

== History ==
The band was formed in 1982 in Toronto, Ontario by vocalist and guitarist Ian Blurton and bassist Rob Taylor, initially inspired by contemporary punk rock bands such as The Clash, Gang of Four and L'Étranger.

Over the next number of years, Blurton also participated in a number of side projects, working with Jolly Tambourine Man, Cowboy Junkies, Slightly Damaged and A Neon Rome. Original percussionist Mike Armstrong left the band during the recording of their 1987 album Slowdance, and would later join King Cobb Steelie.

The band's 1989 album Soapbox featured the song "Pat's Decline", the band's first single to garner widespread national exposure on MuchMusic and Brave New Waves.

Drummer Ron Duffy left the band in 1991, and was replaced by Glenn Milchem for the recording of their 1992 album Smile. Following the recording, Milchem left to join Blue Rodeo, and was replaced by John Richardson. Bernard Maiezza, formerly of A Neon Rome, also joined the band during this era.

Smile was produced by Michael-Philip Wojewoda, at the same time as he was juggling two other significant projects, Barenaked Ladies' Gordon and Rheostatics' Whale Music. The album, which was recorded in just four days on a budget of just $5,000, spawned the band's only Top 40 charting single, "There You Go", which took off after a radio program director in Saskatchewan placed the song in rotation on his station. The album, a sprawling 21-song release which the band acknowledged would have been a double album if it had been released prior to the compact disc era, was compared by critics to Sonic Youth's influential Daydream Nation. Fellow musicians also frequently praised the album; Milchem wore a Change of Heart T-shirt in Blue Rodeo's music video for "Rain Down on Me", Steven Page wore one in Barenaked Ladies' video for "Brian Wilson", and Andrew Scott wore one in Sloan's original video for "Underwhelmed".

Following a cross-Canada tour with Crash Vegas, Taylor chose to leave the band. He was replaced by John Borra, Maiezza's former bandmate in A Neon Rome who had also previously toured as a solo artist opening for Change of Heart. The band then embarked on tours as an opening act for The Tragically Hip and Blue Rodeo. They also won $100,000 from that year's CFNY-FM "Discovery to Disc" competition, over Treble Charger and Killjoys.

Following the tour to support their 1994 album Tummysuckle, Borra left the band and was replaced by Rob Higgins for the band's final album, 1997's Steelteeth. Videos for the singles "Little Kingdoms" and "Grifter's Plow" received substantial airplay on MuchMusic's alternative showcase program The Wedge.

The band toured in 1997 to support Steelteeth, including the Another Roadside Attraction festival tour, but broke up soon afterward.

Blurton, the band's singer and main songwriter, went on to form the bands Blurtonia and C'mon, as well as becoming a record producer. Maiezza went on to form Cookie Duster with Brendan Canning of hHead; that band released its debut album, produced by Blurton, in 2001.

== Reunion ==
The band's Steelteeth lineup, consisting of Blurton, Richardson, Higgins and Maiezza, reformed for a one-off show at the Horseshoe Tavern in Toronto on June 20, 2009.

A new 25 song, two-LP compilation entitled There You Go '82 - '97 has been assembled by Ian Blurton and was released on September 18, 2012 by Sonic Unyon Records. To celebrate, the band reunited for a series of reunion shows starting with the 2012 edition of the Supercrawl festival in Hamilton, Ontario on September 15. On October 5, 2012 there was a special Change of Heart show at the Horseshoe Tavern, which featured the participation of every former band member.

The lineup of Blurton, Maiezza, Milchem and Taylor reunited again in 2017 for the 25th anniversary vinyl reissue of the Smile album, playing shows in Ontario and Alberta.

In 2025 they released In the Wreckage, their first album of new material since Steelteeth. They supported the album's release with two shows at the Sound Garage in Toronto, their first new shows since the 2017 reunion tour.

== Discography ==
- 50 Ft. Up (1986)
- Slowdance (1987)
- Soapbox (1989)
- Smile (1992)
- Tummysuckle (1994)
- Steelteeth (1997)
- There You Go '82 - '97 (2012)
- In the Wreckage (2025)
