= Razor (band) =

Canadian thrash metal band

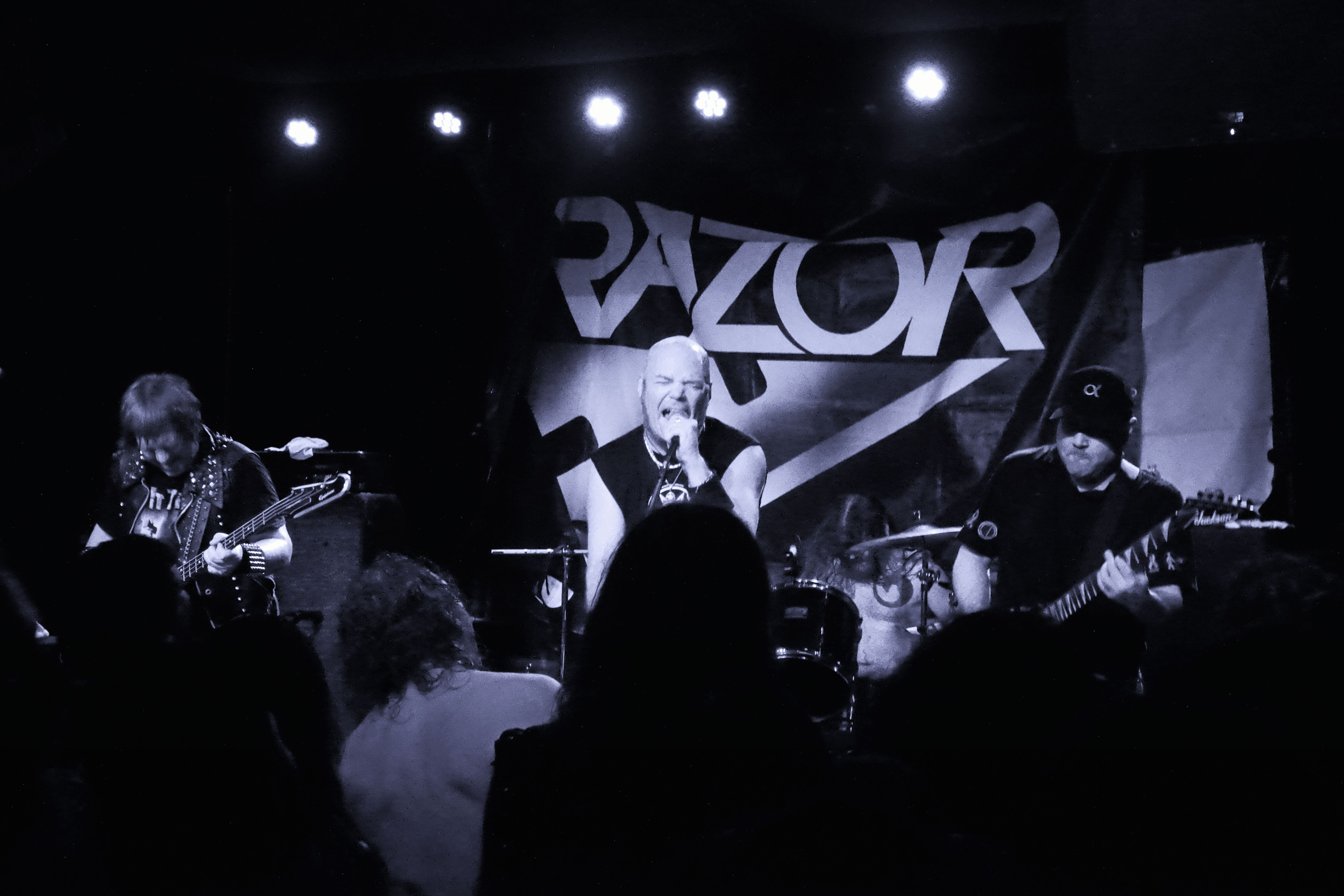
- Razor performing in 2016

Background information
- Origin: Guelph, Ontario, Canada
- Genres: Thrash metal; speed metal
- Years active: 1983–1992, 1996–present
- Labels: Voice, Viper, Steamhammer, Fringe Product, Hypnotic
- Members: Dave Carlo; Bob Reid; Mike Campagnolo; Shareef Hassanien
- Past members: John Scheffel; Stace "Sheepdog" McLaren; Mike "M-Bro" Embro; Rich Oosterbosch; Jon Armstrong; Adam Carlo; Rob Mills; Rider Johnson
- Website: razorband.com

Razor is a Canadian thrash metal band formed in 1983 at Guelph, Ontario. They are recognized as Canadian thrash metal pioneers, and have been referred to as one of the country's "Big Four", alongside Sacrifice, Voivod, and Annihilator.

== History ==
=== Early years and split (1983–1992) ===
Guitarist Dave Carlo formed Razor in 1983. Vocalist and guitarist John Scheffel was in the band at the time, but left in 1984. After two other vocalists, Carlo established a line-up featuring vocalist Stace "Sheepdog" McLaren, bassist Mike Campagnolo, and drummer Mike "M-Bro" Embro. The founding members were former schoolmates. A five-track demo was recorded in 1984 prior to the release of the Armed & Dangerous EP in May 1984 by Voice Records, which received underground acclaim. The pre-production demo album Escape the Fire was recorded in December 1984. It would become the first full-length album, Executioner's Song, released in April 1985 through Viper Records. Evil Invaders followed in October 1985. Razor performed in the United States and Canada with Slayer, Motörhead, and Venom.

The third album, Malicious Intent, was released in April 1986. Internal conflicts and the lack of an official release in the United States affected the album. The band requested to be released from Viper/Attic Records, which was granted in January 1987. Free of their contract, they released their self-financed fourth album, Custom Killing, in July 1987. The album met poor commercial success and was in turn overlooked by fans, with the music moving to a more experimental, progressive approach than previous releases. Drummer Mike Embro and bassist Mike Campagnolo left the band shortly after the album's release and were quickly replaced with Dave Carlo's brother Adam on bass and Rob Mills on drums. Razor returned to their roots with the fifth album Violent Restitution, which was released in 1988 by Steamhammer. It was well-received, being considered more aggressive and heavier than its predecessor. To date, it remains the band’s most commercially successful release.

Vocalist Stace McLaren's interest in the band declined which eventually led to his departure. He was replaced with London, Ontario vocalist Bob Reid, whose band SFH had been opening shows for Razor in early 1988. The band then signed with Fringe Product and released Shotgun Justice in March 1990. They headlined smaller venues, performing with Sacrifice and Disciples of Power. Prior to the recording of the next album, drummer Rob Mills was involved in an accident which made him unable to perform. Around that same time, Adam Carlo left the band and was replaced with SFH bassist Jon Armstrong. The next album Open Hostility was released in 1991. Due to Mills' injury and inability to perform on the album, Dave Carlo used a drum machine to replicate his style. Mills later returned and Razor embarked on a tour in support of the album leading up to their final performance on October 2, 1992. Following the tour, Dave Carlo, feeling that musical tastes had changed and that Razor had run its course, decided to retire and the band split-up. In 1994, a career retrospective compilation called Exhumed was issued by Fringe Product.

=== Reformation and recent years (1996–present) ===
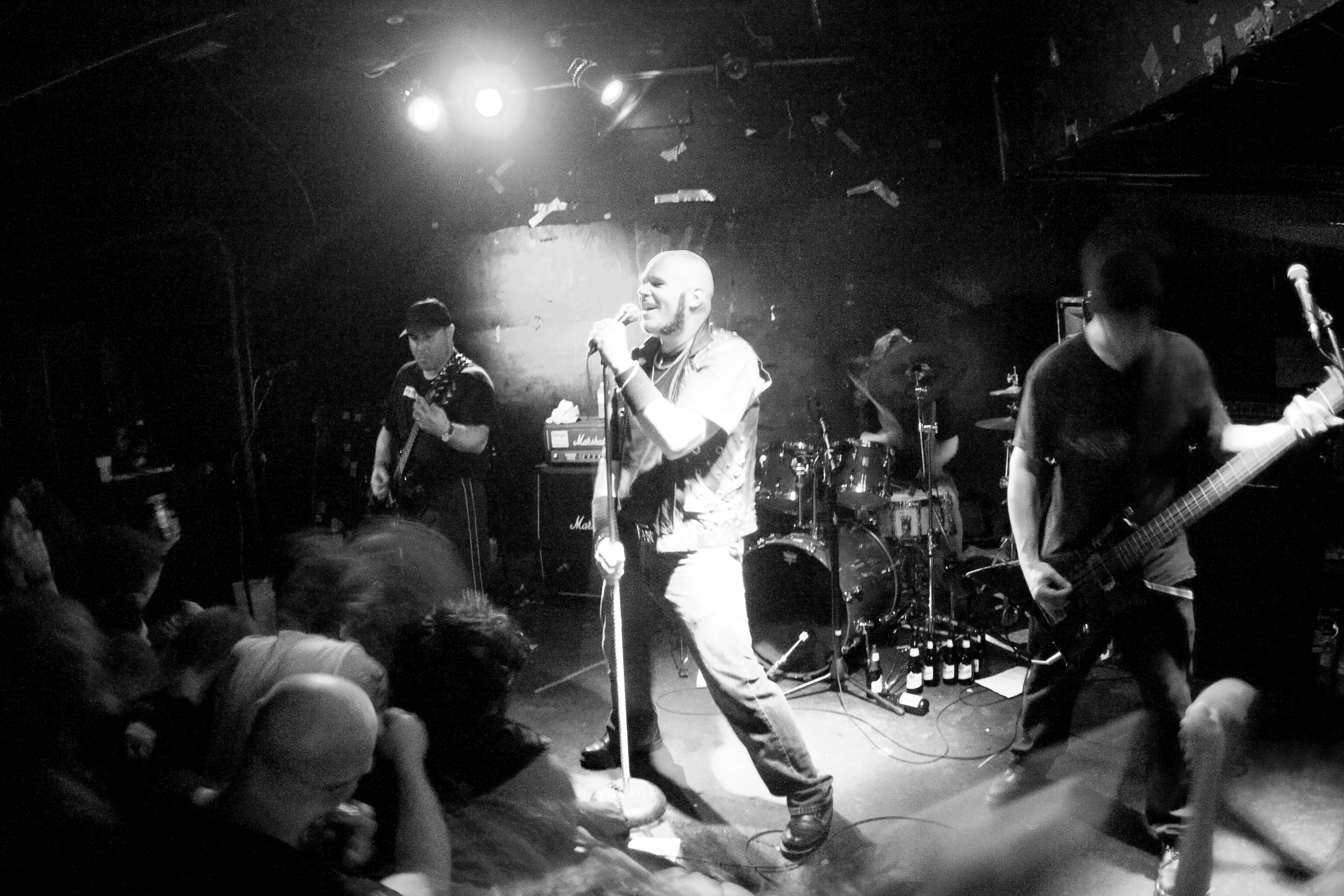
Razor live in Toronto, 2009

In 1996, Razor became active again as a result of vocalist Bob Reid's idea of reforming the band. Both Reid and Carlo were joined by Armstrong and SFH drummer Rich Oosterbosch. The eighth studio album Decibels was released in 1997 by Hypnotic Records. Armstrong and Oosterbosch would no longer be in the band and was replaced by returning members Rob Mills and Adam Carlo (before being replaced by Mike Campagnolo).

Razor took part on The Gates of Hell tour in 2005, the Headbangers Open Air Festival in 2009 and the True Thrash Festival in Osaka in 2011. A DVD of this performance was released only in Japan in February 2012.

On April 19, 2012, Carlo was diagnosed with Stage 2 oral cancer, but was successfully treated and resumed his guitar duties in 2015. The band performed at a charity event in 2014, the Maryland Deathfest in 2015 and the California Deathfest in 2016.

In 2014, drummer Rob Mills left the band and was replaced with Ripp'rd drummer Rider Johnson.

The ninth studio album Cycle of Contempt was released on September 23, 2022, the first studio album in 25 years.

In January 2026, former drummer Mike Embro passed away at the age of 63.

== Band members ==
=== Current ===
- Dave Carlo – guitars (1983–1992, 1996–present)
- Mike Campagnolo – bass (1983–1987, 2005–2008, 2011–present)
- Bob Reid – vocals (1989–1992, 1996–present)
- Shareef Hassanien – drums (2018–2019, 2023–present)

=== Former ===
- John Scheffel – vocals (1983–1984)
- Mike 'M-Bro" Embro – drums (1983–1987; died 2026)
- Stace "Sheepdog" McLaren – vocals (1984–1989)
- Rob Mills – drums (1987–1992, 1998–2014)
- Adam Carlo – bass (1987–1990, 2003–2005, 2008–2011)
- John Armstrong – bass (1990–1992, 1996–2002)
- Rich Oosterbosch – drums (1996–1997)
- Rider Johnson - drums (2014–2018, 2019–2023)

== Discography ==
=== Studio albums ===
- Executioner's Song (1985)
- Evil Invaders (1985)
- Malicious Intent (1986)
- Custom Killing (1987)
- Violent Restitution (1988)
- Shotgun Justice (1990)
- Open Hostility (1991)
- Decibels (1997)
- Cycle of Contempt (2022)

=== EPs ===
- Armed & Dangerous (1984)

=== Live albums ===
- Live! Osaka Saikou (2016)

=== Demos ===
- Demo 84 (1984)
- Escape the Fire (1984)
- Decibels (1992)

=== Compilations ===
- Exhumed (1994)

=== Boxed sets ===
- 35 Years Thrash Insanity (2020)
