= Agitpop (album) =

Studio album by The Lowest of the Low
- Released: May 31, 2019
- Recorded: 2019
- Studio: Union Sound Company
- Genre: Rock
- Length: 48:06
- Label: Warner Music Canada
- Producer: David Bottrill

The Lowest of the Low chronology
Do the Right Now (2017)	Agitpop (2019)	Taverns and Palaces (2021)

Agitpop is the fifth studio album by the Canadian band The Lowest of the Low. This is the third consecutive album featuring a new bassist, as Greg Smith from The Weakerthans replaced long time Ron Hawkins collaborator Derrick Brady. The record is a collection of protest songs that respond to current global events, including the rise of fascism.

Warner Music Canada enabled them to sign an established producer for the project. As big fans of The Clash, they initially targeted Mick Jones, who was unavailable. David Bottrill produced the record. Hawkins, who had difficulty working with previous producer Don Smith due to Smith's racist comments and distraction for his next project, worked well with Bottrill and unveiled an aggressive plan for the recording sessions. They recorded 14 songs in 19 days. Hawkins described the finished record as "songs about revolution and redistribution, liberation, love and justice."

The track 'Bottle Rockets' is the band's first song credited to multiple songwriters, including the full band and ex-bassist Dylan Parker.

The political nature of the music caused friction within the band. The first single, 'The Barricade' features the lyric "My next vote's with a brick" and some band members were uncomfortable with the suggestion of violence.

"The Barricade" was released as the album's first single on May 1. The record was also released as double album on vinyl.

== Reception ==
The Spill Magazine praised the album's ability to balance big political ideas and hope.

== Track listing ==
All songs written by Ron Hawkins except where noted.

No.	Title	Length
1.	"Bonnie & Clyde"	3:04
2.	"Bottle Rockets (Ron Hawkins, David Alexander, Lawrence Nichols, Dylan Parker, Stephen Stanley)"	3:56
3.	"The Ballad of Late-Era Capitalism"	2:51
4.	"When She Falls"	2:53
5.	"F-Noise (Rebel Radio)"	2:53
6.	"The Barricade"	3:32
7.	"Night of a Thousand Guns"	5:29
8.	"Love 'N' Justice"	2:40
9.	"Imogene"	3:36
10.	"Seven-A"	2:30
11.	"Midnight Maryanne"	3:24
12.	"A Thousand Lights"	3:53
13.	"Permanent Revolution"	3:49
Total length:		48:06
