= Malicious Intent =

Malicious Intent may refer to:

- Malicious Intent (album)
- Malicious Intent (novel)
- Bad faith
