= Shotgun Justice =

Studio album by Razor
- Released: March 1, 1990
- Recorded: July–October 1989
- Studios: Phase One Studios, Toronto
- Genre: Thrash metal
- Label: Fringe Product
- Producer: Brian Taylor

Razor chronology
Violent Restitution (1988)	Shotgun Justice (1990)	Open Hostility (1991)

Professional ratings
Review scores
Source	Rating
Classic Thrash	10/10 link

Shotgun Justice is the sixth studio album by Canadian speed/thrash metal band Razor. Released in 1990 on Fringe Product, it is the final album to feature Adam Carlo on bass, Rob Mills on drums and their first with vocalist Bob Reid. Music videos were made for "Shotgun Justice" and "American Luck". This album is dedicated to the memory of Mark "Hamilton Headcaver" Brzezicki.

== Track listing ==
Side A
No.	Title	Length
1.	"Miami"	3:15
2.	"United by Hatred"	2:42
3.	"Violence Condoned"	2:22
4.	"Electric Torture"	2:49
5.	"Meaning of Pain"	3:10
6.	"Stabbed in the Back"	2:17
7.	"Shotgun Justice"	3:16

Side B
No.	Title	Length
8.	"Parricide"	2:45
9.	"American Luck"	2:33
10.	"Brass Knuckles"	3:15
11.	"Burning the Bridges"	2:20
12.	"Concussion"	2:25
13.	"Cranial Stomp"	2:31
14.	"The Pugilist"	3:45
Total length:		39:25

2015 Relapse Records CD and digital bonus tracks
No.	Title	Length
1.	"Meaning of Pain" (Show Opening Somewhere Shotgun Justice Tour)	4:01
2.	"Violence Condoned" (Recorded live in August 1989)	3:11
3.	"Cranial Stomp" (Learning and Refining)	1:28
4.	"Miami" (Original Mix)	3:12
5.	"Electric Torture" (Alternate Version)	2:48
6.	"Brass Knuckles" (Alternate Version)	3:12
Total length:		57:17

== Notes ==
- Re-issued in 2010 as a 12" limited edition colored vinyl by High Roller Records in heavy cardboard with lyric sheet, limited to 750 copies with an alternate cover art

== Personnel ==
- Adam Carlo – bass
- Dave Carlo – guitars
- Rob Mills – drums
- Bob Reid – vocals

=== Production ===
- Steve Kubica – photography
- Brian Taylor – producer
- Alexander von Wieding – artwork and design (2009 reissue)
- Joe Primeau – engineering
- Greg Johnstone – cover art
- Dana Marostega – layout
