= John Donoghue =

John Donoghue may refer to:

- John Donoghue (neuroscientist), professor of neuroscience at Brown University; co-founder of Cyberkinetics
- John Donoghue (writer) (born 1964), British humorist
- John Donoghue (footballer) (1903–?), Scottish football player
- John Francis Donoghue (1928–2011), American Roman Catholic bishop
- John P. Donoghue (born 1957), American politician
- John Talbott Donoghue (1853–1903), American artist
- John Donoghue (physicist) (born 1950), American theoretical physicist

== See also ==
- John Donahue (disambiguation)
- Jack Donohue (disambiguation)
