= Open Hostility =

Studio album by Razor
- Released: 1991
- Recorded: May 1991 at Umbrella Sound, Toronto
- Genre: Thrash metal
- Label: Fringe Product
- Producer: Dave Carlo

Razor chronology
| Shotgun Justice (1990) | Open Hostility (1991) | Decibels (1997) |

Professional ratings
Review scores
| Source | Rating |
|---|---|
| ThrashPit | 9/10 |

Open Hostility is the seventh studio album by Canadian speed/thrash metal band Razor, released in 1991 by Fringe Product. Drummer Rob Mills was unable to participate on the album due to injuries sustained in an accident, so his parts were performed by guitarist Dave Carlo using a drum machine. Mills later returned for the filming of the "Sucker for Punishment" music video. Open Hostility is dedicated to the memory of Ray “Black Metal” Wallace.

== Track listing ==
Side A
| No. | Title | Length |
|---|---|---|
| 1. | "In Protest" | 3:44 |
| 2. | "Sucker for Punishment" | 4:03 |
| 3. | "Bad Vibrations" | 3:01 |
| 4. | "Road Gunner" | 3:08 |
| 5. | "Cheers" | 2:35 |
| 6. | "Red Money" | 2:54 |

Side B
| No. | Title | Length |
|---|---|---|
| 7. | "Free Lunch" | 2:39 |
| 8. | "Iron Legions" | 2:34 |
| 9. | "Mental Torture" | 3:29 |
| 10. | "Psychopath" | 2:33 |
| 11. | "I Disagree" | 2:58 |
| 12. | "End of the War" | 3:40 |
| Total length: | | 37:18 |

2015 Relapse Records CD and digital bonus tracks
| No. | Title | Length |
|---|---|---|
| 1. | "Tow the Line" (Unreleased Track Late 1990) | 4:33 |
| 2. | "Taking the Strain" (Unreleased Track Late 1990) | 3:05 |
| 3. | "Violent Propensity" (Unreleased Track Late 1990) | 3:12 |
| 4. | "Taking the Strain" (Instrumental Version, Unreleased Track Late 1990) | 2:56 |
| 5. | "End of the War" (Rehearsal with Rob Mills) | 3:11 |
| 6. | "Tow the Line" (Instrumental Demo with Programmed Drums) | 4:11 |
| 7. | "Red Money" (Instrumental Demo) | 2:56 |
| 8. | "Iron Legions" (Instrumental Demo) | 2:35 |
| Total length: | | 1:03:57 |

== Notes ==
- Three vinyl pressings were released in 2010 by High Roller Records as a limited edition with two to three different colours and an alternate cover art
- Re-released in 2015 by Relapse Records in CD and digital format containing 8 bonus tracks

== Personnel ==
- John Armstrong - Bass
- Dave Carlo - Guitars & Drum Programming
- Bob Reid - Vocals

=== Production ===
- James Stanley - Recording
- Alexander von Wieding - Artwork & Design (2009 Re-issue)
- Larry Sullivan - Cover art
- Brian Taylor - Recording
- Dave Carlo - Producer
- Dana Marostega - Layout
