= Violent Restitution =

Studio album by Razor
- Released: 1988
- Recorded: December 1987 – January 1988
- Studio: Phase One Studios, Toronto
- Genre: Thrash metal
- Length: 40:53
- Label: SPV
- Producer: Brian Taylor

Razor chronology
Custom Killing (1987)	Violent Restitution (1988)	Shotgun Justice (1990)

Violent Restitution is the fifth full-length album from the Canadian speed/thrash metal band Razor, released in 1988. It is the first album to feature Rob Mills on drums and Dave Carlo's brother Adam on bass and the last one to feature Stace "Sheepdog" McLaren on vocals. The album is dedicated to late actor Charles Bronson.

== Track listing ==
Side A
No.	Title	Length
1.	"The Marshall Arts"	2:45
2.	"Hypertension"	3:21
3.	"Taste the Floor"	2:07
4.	"Behind Bars"	2:15
5.	"Below the Belt"	2:54
6.	"I'll Only Say it Once"	2:28
7.	"Enforcer"	3:44

Side B
No.	Title	Length
8.	"Violent Restitution"	2:33
9.	"Out of the Game"	2:47
10.	"Edge of the Razor"	4:15
11.	"Eve of the Storm"	3:20
12.	"Discipline"	2:55
13.	"Fed Up"	2:30
14.	"Soldier of Fortune"	2:59
Total length:		40:53

2015 Relapse Records CD and digital bonus tracks
No.	Title	Length
1.	"Roll out the Barrel" (Instrumental, hidden track placed as track 12)	0:21
2.	"Shootout" (Recorded live in February 1988 in Toronto)	4:10
3.	"Snake Eyes" (Recorded live in February 1988 in Toronto)	2:40
4.	"The Marshall Arts/Hypertension" (Recorded live in February 1988 in Toronto)	6:02
Total length:		54:06

== Personnel ==
- Stace McLaren – vocals
- Dave Carlo – guitars
- Adam Carlo – bass
- Rob Mills – drums

Production

- Brian Taylor – producer
- Stephen Darch – photography
- Steve Hutchens – cover art
- André Tueroff – back cover
- Bill Kennedy – engineering
