= John Donahue =

John or Jack Donahue may refer to:

- John Donahue (baseball) (1894–1949), Major League Baseball right fielder
- Jiggs Donahue (John Augustine Donahue, 1879–1913), Major League Baseball first baseman and catcher
- Deacon Donahue (John Stephen Michael Donahue, 1920–2008), Major League Baseball relief pitcher
- John F. Donahue (died 2017), chairman of Federated Investors
- Jack Donahue (1806–1830), Australian bushranger
- Jack Donahue (American football) (1904–1984), American football player and coach
- Jack Donahue (politician) (born 1944), Louisiana state senator from St. Tammany Parish

== See also ==
- Jonathan Donahue (born 1966), rock musician
- John Donoghue (disambiguation)
- Jack Donohue (disambiguation)
