= Lori Cullen =

Canadian pop and jazz singer-songwriter

- Genres: Pop, jazz
- Occupation: Singer-songwriter
- Years active: 2000–present
- Website: loricullen.com

Lori Cullen is a Canadian pop and jazz singer-songwriter. She has released seven albums as a solo artist, has collaborated with other artists as a guest musician, and is a Juno Award nominee.

Originally from Mississauga, Ontario, Cullen released her debut album Garden Path in 2000. She followed up with So Much, an album of jazz standards, in 2002, before returning to original folk-pop songwriting for 2004's Uneven Hill. During her early career, she kept these two sides of her artistic personality separate, recording distinct albums and distinguishing her live performances as being either folk or jazz shows; during her tour to support Uneven Hill, however, she decided to instead start integrating the two genres.

Her song "Away So Long", cowritten with Brian MacMillan, was the winner of the 2005 Colleen Peterson Songwriting Award.

Her next album, 2006's Calling for Rain, was an album of covers of artists such as Joni Mitchell, Gordon Lightfoot, Richard Thompson and Randy Newman, done in a style that incorporated both pop and jazz influences. It was nominated for a Juno Award for Vocal Jazz Album of the Year at the Juno Awards of 2007.

Her most recent album, Sexsmith Swinghammer Songs (2016), features songs written for her by Ron Sexsmith and Kurt Swinghammer.

== Discography ==
- Garden Path (2000)
- So Much (2002)
- Uneven Hill (2004)
- Calling for Rain (2006)
- Buttercup Bugle (2007)
- That Certain Chartreuse (2011)
- Sexsmith Swinghammer Songs (True North, 2016)
