= Jolly Tambourine Man =

- Origin: Toronto, Ontario, Canada
- Genres: Punk rock, post-punk
- Years active: 1983–84
- Past members: Stewart Black; Evan Taylor; Paul Peterson; Steve Rhodes; Warren Philips; Greg McKenzie; Ian Blurton; Mike Armstrong; Caroline Savage

Jolly Tambourine Man was a Canadian alternative rock band based in Toronto. Ontario They were active between 1982 and 1984. The band recorded a demo tape and a 7" single during its lifetime. The single "Apple Strudel Man" was one of the first independent videos to be placed into rotation on MuchMusic.

== History ==
The Jolly Tambourine Man was a side project of punk band Blibber and the Rat Crushers during a period when the main band had abandoned their BOSS DR-55 drum machine and was on a protracted search for a permanent drummer. Its core lineup consisted of Blibber guitarist Stewart Black and the band's friend Steve Rhodes. With guest musicians Warren Philips and Greg McKenzie, the band recorded a self-titled and self-released cassette in 1983. Songs on the demo tape were "Nazi Punks Go Bowling", "Lisa Burger", "Gropnick", "I am Albella", "Apple Strudel Man", "Mold in My Ears", "Scary Bowl" and "Movin' On Up". A song about Terry Fox called "Dash for Cash" was included in the 1983 punk music retrospective film Not Dead Yet.

Rhodes and Black then recruited Ian Blurton and Mike Armstrong of Change of Heart and Caroline Savage of Katwimmen to appear on a rerecording of "Apple Strudel Man", which was released as a 7" single in 1984 with the B-side "Sweater in Sri Lanka".

A video was created for the single by film producer Bill Davis and released the same week as MuchMusic's initial launch, was added to MuchMusic's rotation; the single was also a hit on Toronto's alternative music station CFNY-FM.

For personal reasons and the inability to find a permanent drummer, both Blibber and Jolly Tambourine Man went on hiatus following the "Apple Strudel Man" single. Blibber and the Rat Crushers "BRC" reemerged in 1990 with the demo release Pope Music.
