= Jack Donohue =

Jack Donohue may refer to:

- Jack Donohue (basketball) (1933–2003), Canadian basketball coach
- Jack Donohue (director) (1908–1984), American film director
- Molly Maguires's member, John "Yellow Jack" Donahue
- Jack Donohue Public School, named after the basketball coach

== See also ==
- John Donoghue (disambiguation)
- John Donahue (disambiguation)
