= Nothing Short of a Bullet =

Live album by The Lowest of the Low
- Released: January 15, 2002
- Recorded: 2000
- Genre: Indie rock
- Label: MapleMusic Recordings
- Producer: John Arnott

The Lowest of the Low chronology
Hallucigenia (1994)	Nothing Short of a Bullet (2002)	Sordid Fiction (2004)

Professional ratings
Review scores
Source	Rating
Allmusic	4.5/5 stars

Nothing Short of a Bullet is a 2002 live album by The Lowest of the Low. The album documents the band's 2000 reunion tour. The title comes from a line in the band's song "For the Hand of Magdalena", Nothing short of a bullet could have broken your will.

It was released on MapleMusic Recordings. The album would be the last to include bassist John Arnott, as the rest of the band had asked him to leave.

The tracks on the album are taken from performances in Toronto and Buffalo. Twelve of the songs were recorded over multiple gigs at the Tralf, in Buffalo on November 14, 15 and 16 of 2000 while the remaining five songs were recorded in Toronto at Lee's Palace, on November 9 and at The Warehouse on November 17 and 18 of that same year. One of the songs performed in concert, "The Unbearable Lightness of Jean", did not appear on either of the band's previously released studio albums, although a live version of it did appear on their Motel 30 single from Hallucigenia. Nine of the songs are from their debut album Shakespeare My Butt while six came from the follow-up, Hallucigenia. In a four and a half star review for AllMusic.com Jason MacNeil said "After an indefinite hiatus, a series of shows in the Toronto and Buffalo area in November 2000 sparked the resulting magic on this impressive live compilation."

The album also contains a studio disc with three new songs, two originals by the band and one cover of a Bad Religion song. Ron Hawkins wrote one of the new tracks, "(These Are) The Lives and Times", while guitarist Stephen Stanley wrote the other new song "New Westminster Taxi Squad". They each perform lead vocals on their songs. The three new songs would prove to be the last recordings with the original lineup as bass player John Arnott exited The Low in 2002.

The original artwork for the album was created by drummer David Alexander while Alexander collaborated with bandmate Steve Stanley on the sleeve layout.

== Track listing ==
All songs written by Ron Hawkins, except where noted.

=== Disc one ===
1. "Motel 30" – 3:22
2. "Eternal Fatalist" – 3:50
3. "Gamble" – 4:47
4. "Kinda the Lonely One" – 3:02
5. "The Unbearable Lightness of Jean" – 3:38
6. "Salesmen, Cheats and Liars" – 3:23
7. "Dogs of February" (Stephen Stanley) – 4:06
8. "City Full of Cowards" – 4:05
9. "Bleed a Little While Tonight" – 5:24
10. "Gossip Talkin' Blues" – 3:38
11. "Eating the Rich" – 4:22
12. "For the Hand of Magdalena" – 3:48
13. "Black Monday" – 5:09
14. "Penedono's Hand" (Stephen Stanley) – 3:26
15. "4 O'Clock Stop" – 3:25
16. "Beer, Graffiti Walls" – 5:59
17. "Rosy and Grey" – 5:54

=== Disc two ===
1. "(These Are) The Lives and Times" – 4:51
2. "New Westminster Taxi Squad" (Stephen Stanley) – 4:03
3. "Kerosene" (Brett Gurewitz) – 2:46
