= The Mercy Now =

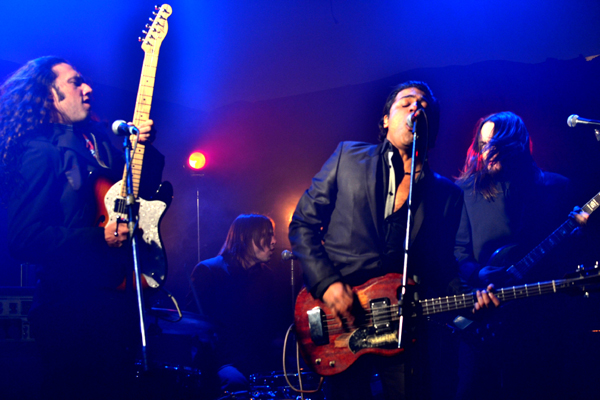

Background information
- Origin: Toronto, Ontario, Canada
- Genres: Rock, soul, garage
- Years active: 2006–present
- Labels: Independent
- Members: Russell Fernandes; Adam Burnett; David Viva; Lee Rogers
- Website: themercynow.com

The Mercy Now is a Canadian rock band from Toronto. The group's members include X-Shikasta frontman Russell Fernandes (vocals, bass and guitar), Adam Burnett (vocals, guitar and bass), David Viva (guitar, keyboards and vocals), and Lee Rogers (drums and vocals). They formed in 2006 and have released several independent recordings including 2010's Ian Blurton-produced Self Control, which included the song "Hard Times", nominated as a finalist and receiving an honorable mention in the rock category in the International Songwriting Competition whose judges included Peter Gabriel and Tom Waits. Benjamin Bowles of Toronto's Now Magazine gave the record a four out of five star rating stating, "When you find yourself involuntarily banging your head 10 seconds into an album and the hard-rock fever doesn't break until the end, that's a very good sign." Johnson Cummins of the Montreal Mirror stated, "If there is a better current rock band in Canada, I've yet to hear them."

In early 2011, the band won the City of Hamilton, Ontario's Y108 Rock and Roll Challenge including a $30,000 prize and is scheduled to record a new EP with Ian Blurton in August. The band is sharing bills this summer with Helix, Hawksley Workman and Dan Hill and America, Jon Anderson of Yes, Helix and The Tea Party at the Festival of Friends.
