= Ian Blurton =

Canadian musician and record producer

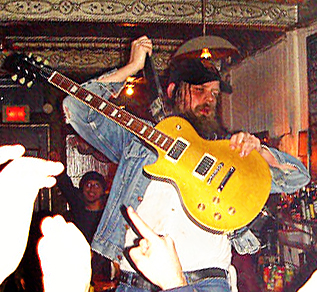
- Ian Blurton with his band C'mon

Background information
- Born: 1965 (age 60–61); Champaign, Illinois, United States
- Origin: Toronto, Ontario, Canada
- Genres: Rock
- Occupations: Musician, songwriter, producer
- Instruments: Guitar, vocals, drums
- Years active: 1984–Present
- Website: thisiscmon.com

Ian Blurton (born 1965) is a Canadian musician and record producer.

== Early life ==
He was born in Champaign, Illinois in 1965, and moved to Toronto in 1973.

== Musical career ==
He has been a part of Toronto's indie music scene since the early 1980s. He was playing drums in the original line-ups for Cowboy Junkies and A Neon Rome before he became the lead vocalist, guitarist and songwriter for Change of Heart. He also performed on Jolly Tambourine Man's single "Apple Strudel Man".

After the breakup of Change of Heart in late 1997, Blurton formed Blurtonia. After that, for a short period he was a member of Bionic before forming C'mon in 2003 with his girlfriend, bassist Katie Lynn Campbell, formerly of Nashville Pussy, and drummer Randy Curnew. Curnew left the band in 2006 and was replaced by Dean Dallas Bentley. In late October 2011, C'mon played their final show at the Bovine Sex Club in Toronto, Ontario.

In the fall of 2009, Blurton released his first official solo album, Happy Endings. Having been created for almost 5 years the album marked a departure from Blurton's work with C'mon in that it represented a number of different genres, including a great deal of psychedelic material. While Blurton played and sang much of the album himself, there also appeared a former Change of Heart/Danko Jones drummer Damon Richardson, Broken Social Scene's Kevin Drew, and Raising the Fawn's Scott Remila. For live reproduction of the record beginning in late 2009, Blurton enlisted a Hamilton, Ontario group called Huron to back him, having recently produced their debut album.

Blurton has produced a number of albums. Among other artists, he has produced albums for The Lowest of the Low, Tricky Woo, Arise and Ruin, Rheostatics, The Mark Inside, Skydiggers, The Weakerthans, Attack in Black, The Carnations, Cursed, Raising the Fawn, Amy Millan, Hunter Valentine, The Mercy Now, The John Smith Band and Cookie Duster.
