= John Borra =

Canadian musician

John Borra is a Canadian musician from Toronto, Ontario, who performed as a supporting musician in punk and alternative rock bands in the 1980s and early 1990s before launching a career as an alternative country singer-songwriter.

== Background ==
Borra began his career as bassist in the band A Neon Rome. After that band broke up during the recording of its second album, he played with bands such as Change of Heart and Groovy Religion in the 1990s, as well as appearing as a session musician on albums by Crash Vegas and Scott B. Sympathy.

== Solo career ==
In 1997, he independently released a self-titled cassette featuring his first foray into country songwriting. This was later reissued on compact disc and online music stores in 2022.

He then formed the John Borra Band with Steve Koch, Colleen Hodgson and Cleave Anderson; this lineup released a self-titled album in 1999, and followed up in 2002 with One Night at Seven in the Morning.

== Rattlesnake Choir ==
He subsequently launched the new band Rattlesnake Choir, with members including Sam Ferrara, Michael Boguski, Tony Benattar, and Miranda Mulholland, originally for a regular club residency at The Dakota Tavern.

This lineup released the album Live Music in 2008, following up with Walkin' the Wire in 2011, and The Prospector's Curse in 2015.

== Return to solo music ==
He subsequently returned to recording and releasing music under his own name, releasing the album Blue Wine in 2020. The album's lead single "Trace in the Wind" was a tribute to actress Tracy Wright.

In 2022, he released Cassettes in Common, an album covering songs by various songwriters who Borra had looked up to as friends and influences, including Keith Whittaker, Bob Snider, Handsome Ned, Art Bergmann, Kyp Harness, and Ron Sexsmith.

His latest album Last Dance at the E Room, a tribute to friend and colleague Peter J. Moore following Moore's death in 2023, was released in October 2025.

== Discography ==
=== Solo ===
- John Borra - 1997
- Blue Wine - 2020
- Cassettes in Common - 2022
- Last Dance at the E Room - 2025

=== John Borra Band ===
- John Borra Band - 1999
- One Night at Seven in the Morning - 2002

=== Rattlesnake Choir ===
- Live Music - 2008
- Walkin' the Wire - 2011
- The Prospector's Curse - 2015
