= Blurtonia =

Canadian indie rock group

- Origin: Toronto, Ontario, Canada
- Genres: Indie rock
- Years active: 1999–2002
- Labels: Grenadine, Sonic Unyon
- Past members: Ian Blurton; Brendan Canning; Randy Curnew; Al Kelso; Sam De Medeiros; Eric Larock; Kevin Drew

Blurtonia was a Canadian indie rock group formed by Ian Blurton, after the break-up of his previous band, Change of Heart.

== History ==
Blurtonia was formed in May 1999 to play live shows in support of Blurton's self-released debut Adventures in the Kingdom of Blurtonia. The band began performing in Toronto, including at the Rivoli and at Humble & Fred Fest at Fort York, The album was co-produced by Daryl Smith, Jon McCann played drums in the original line-up and it was later re-released by Sonic Unyon.

In addition to Adventures, Blurtonia released a self-titled album on Grenadine Records in 2002. At the time, the band was composed of Ian Blurton on guitar and vox, Al Kelso (ex-The Dinner Is Ruined) on guitar, Randy Curnew on drums, Sam De Medeiros on bass, plus Brendan Canning and Kevin Drew. McCann left the band to play with Guided By Voices.

The band made a cross-Canada tour in September 2002 with Eric Larock on bass, in place of Medeiros.

In 2006, Blurtonia released the album The Survivalists.

Blurton later joined the band C'Mon, and worked as a recording and producing engineer at Chemical Sounds in Toronto. Drew and Canning went on to solo careers; Canning formed his own record label.

== See also ==
- Music of Canada
- Canadian rock
- List of bands from Canada
- List of Canadian musicians
- Category:Canadian musical groups
