= John Donoghue (writer) =

Travel writer

John Donoghue (born 1964) is a humourist, travel writer, and police officer from Wales. He is best known for his 2004 book Shakespeare My Butt!, a humorous travelogue of unusual and oddly-named destinations in Great Britain. The book's title was an homage to the 1991 album Shakespeare My Butt by Canadian folk rock band The Lowest of the Low.

After a career in the military, he joined the police and in 2011, published his second book Police, Crime & 999: The True Story of a Front Line Officer – a humorous look at a year in his life as a response officer.

Still a serving police officer, he has gone on to publish Police, Lies & Alibis (2013), and Police, Arrests & Suspects (2015).
