= Vital Sines =

Canadian post-punk/new wave band

- Also known as: Tryfono & The Heat Resistant Sheep, Burundi Plumbers, The Offenders
- Origin: Toronto, Ontario, Canada
- Genres: Post-punk, new wave
- Years active: 1981–1988
- Labels: Midnight Records, Fringe Product
- Past members: Rick Winkle; Terry Michaelson; James Gray; Gord Wilson; Chris Weekes; Mike Clarke; Glenn Milchem; Kurt Swinghammer; Scott Taylor; Gary Alexander; Tony Klinakis

Vital Sines was a Canadian post-punk/new wave band active between 1980 and 1988 in Toronto, Ontario, Canada. They are best known for their hit single, Collage, which was recently listed as one of the most influential Canadian alternative rock songs.

== History ==
The band got their start in punk rock venues in Toronto playing under the name 'The Offenders'. When Scott Taylor, the original drummer left the band they changed the name to Vital Sines, releasing their first indie single, "Subway Suicide" in 1981. Following this they often played under the cover name "Tryfono & The Heat Resistant Sheep" as openers for better known acts.

When the second drummer, Chris Weekes, left the band, and was replaced by Mike Clarke they re-invented their sound. In 1982, they released a seven-track cassette album, Rhythms In Dark. This was moderately successful in the Toronto scene, and convinced the band to invest in a vinyl release of new material.

Their work appeared in 1984 as the four-track Collage 12-inch EP. Losing their punk sounds, the new album combined the atmospheric guitar backing like those of Brian Eno or Killing Joke with the pretentious lyrics and deep vocals of Simple Minds and Gang of Four. The eponymous single "Collage" gained wide airplay on CFNY-FM, and the indie release quickly sold out.

David Ross, who helped record the EP, took a job with Midnight Records in the UK. Midnight picked up an option on Collage, leading to a re-release in 1985 along with a music video. The re-release sold tens of thousands of copies in Toronto record shops, with continued sales well into 1985. CFNY nominated both the song and video for U-Know awards.

The success of the Collage EP and its video led to jobs as opening acts for Shriekback, Hunters & Collectors, Siouxsie and the Banshees, and Love and Rockets.

The band started recording follow up at their home studio Rhythms in Darkness. These demo tapes with the same line up as the Collage EP were not widely released. It included songs later re-recorded for Big Dark Dreams.

Follow-up work started in 1985 at Daniel Lanois' Grant Avenue Studio in Hamilton, Ontario, and Comfort Sound in Toronto. The band sold off most of their home studio to finance these recordings. Guitarist Gord Wilson, left the band early in the recordings, and was replaced by Kurt Swinghammer. The late 1986 six-song EP Big Dark Dreams was picked up by punk label Fringe Product, and produced another CFNY hit single, "Break These Chains", leading to a video released in 1987. This led to Fringe Product releasing yet another sold-out run of Collage.

This led to college tours in the eastern US, but in May 1987 the midst of their popularity, Swinghammer and drummer Glenn Milchem left the band; Milchem joining Andrew Cash and then Blue Rodeo. The surviving original members, Rick Winkle, Terry Michaelson and James Grey continued touring with new band members, Gary Alexander and Tony Klinakis, but the band split up following the US tour in 1988.
