= Decibels (album) =

Studio album by Razor
- Released: May 1997
- Recorded: February 1997
- Studios: The Tube, Hamilton, Ontario
- Genre: Thrash metal
- Label: Hypnotic Records
- Producers: Dave Carlo, Bob Reid

Razor chronology
Open Hostility (1991)	Decibels (1997)	Cycle of Contempt (2022)

Decibels is the eighth studio album by Canadian speed/thrash metal band Razor. This was the band's first album since 1991's Open Hostility and since their split in 1992, as well as the only album to feature drummer Rich Oosterbosch and the last with bassist Jon Armstrong.

== Track listing ==
No.	Title	Length
1.	"Decibels"	4:24
2.	"Jimi the Fly"	3:43
3.	"Life Sentence"	3:28
4.	"Liar"	4:05
5.	"The Game"	3:41
6.	"Great White Lie"	5:10
7.	"Open Hostility"	3:02
8.	"Nine Dead"	3:34
9.	"Goof Soup"	4:16
10.	"Violence...Gun Control"	7:04
Total length:		42:27

Bonus track
No.	Title	Length
1.	"Instant Death" (Re-recorded Version)	3:24
Total length:		45:51

2011 vinyl bonus tracks
No.	Title	Length
1.	"Instant Death" (Re-recorded Version)	3:24
2.	"Rebel Onslaught" (Re-recorded Version)	3:56
Total length:		49:47

== Notes ==
- Despite the additional bonus track on the original CD release, it is not listed on the track list. The 2004 CD re-issue by Blackend Records omits it.
- Pressings of the 12" limited edition vinyl re-issue by High Roller Records features an alternate track list and cover art and two bonus tracks.

== Personnel ==
- Bob Reid – vocals
- Dave Carlo – guitars
- Jon Armstrong – bass
- Rich Oosterbosch – drums

=== Production ===
- Dave Carlo – producer
- Bob Reid – producer
- Tom Treumuth – executive producer
- Daryn Barry – engineering
- Alfio Annibalini – engineering
- Darko – photography
- Roland – cover model
