= Kurt Swinghammer =

Canadian singer-songwriter and visual artist

Kurt Swinghammer is a Canadian singer-songwriter and visual artist based in Toronto.

He has released 13 full-length albums of original songs and as a session musician appears on over 100 CDs. He has also composed extensively for film and television. As a visual artist he is represented in the permanent collection of the Canada Council Art Bank. He has worked in the commercial realm as illustrator, graphic designer, wardrobe designer, set designer, and art director on music videos.

Swinghammer currently exhibits his paintings at INabstracto in Toronto and the True North Gallery in Waterdown, Ontario. In 2016, True North Records released Sexsmith Swinghammer Songs by Lori Cullen, which features 12 songs co-written with lyricist Ron Sexsmith. In 2017, he independently released the self-produced album titled Another Another and created animated videos for each of the twelve tracks.

== Early life and education ==
Swinghammer grew up in Ontario. His family moved several times, eventually to Newcastle, Ontario. He attended Clarke High School, where he created posters for school events and graphics for the yearbook. He taught himself to play the guitar.

== Music career ==
While attending the Ontario College of Art, he produced his first multi-track recording of experimental music and used the tapes in improvised multi-media performances with slide projectors. After moving to Toronto in 1984 he began presenting his songs on acoustic guitar using an array of effect pedals. From 1984 to 1988, he independently released six album length cassettes of original songs. In 1990, the indie label Fringe Product released his CD PoMo A GoGo, recorded in a 24 track studio and which featured an array of musicians including Glenn Milchem (Blue Rodeo), Holly Cole, Chis Tait (Chalk Circle), Rebecca Jenkins, Hugh Marsh, Curtis Driedger, and Kim Deschamps. Swinghammer appeared on the cover of NOW magazine following the release.

In 1999, he collaborated with Andy Stochansky on an album of instrumentals called Remote. The two artists traded ADAT tapes back and forth, gradually building up the experimental tracks.

Swinghammer's next album was Vostok 6 – an elaborate electronic-oriented song cycle about Valentina Tershkova, the Russian cosmonaut who was the first woman in space. It was self produced and mixed by Michael Phillip Wojewoda. Guest appearances include Tyler Stewart (Barenaked Ladies), and the late, great voice of CITY TV, Mark Daley. CBC Radio brought him and a full band into the studio to record a live version of the album for broadcast. Ani DiFranco re-released it in the US on her label Righteous Babe Records, and Swinghammer opened several tours for her in the US around this time.

The next Swinghammer album was Black Eyed Sue in 2001 – a non-fictional song cycle set in Toronto and performed entirely on acoustic instruments.

The solo voice and acoustic guitar album Augusta was recorded live in 2004 by Ron Skinner at The Glenn Gould Studio at CBC Toronto, and was initially intended for radio broadcast. Additional un-aired material was included on the CD.

Also that year, his ambient techno soundtrack to the cult horror film Ginger Snaps 2 – Unleashed, was released on CD on the Outside label.

In 2011, Turpentine Wind was released on CD and with a Blu-ray disc of animations. The song cycle is an homage to Canadian landscape painter Tom Thomson. It was produced and mixed by Michael Phillip Wojewoda. Swinghammer's band on this recording was Maury Lafoy on bass, Mark Mariash on drums, and Dave Matheson on piano. They performed the album live at The Music Gallery with live video projections by Justin Stephenson, and CBC Radio broadcast the show.

He was invited to be the first artist in residence at The National Music Centre in Calgary in 2012. He wrote a body of work that he recorded on 35 vintage electronic instruments from the CANTOS Collection including Ondes Martenot, Novachord, and a Raymond Scott Clavivox. Michael Phillip Wojewoda engineered and mixed the Another Another project which was released in 2017.

Ron Sexsmith and Swinghammer wrote an album of new material for Lori Cullen to sing, and the result was released in 2016 as Sexsmith Swinghammer Songs. Maury Lafoy produced, he arranged the material, and David Traver-Smith mixed. The album is available on True North Records.

== Session musician and sideman ==
In 2000, he won the "Best Local Guitarist Award" from the NOW magazine Reader's Poll. Selected guitar session credits include albums by Ani DiFranco, Serena Ryder, Royal Wood, Dragonette, Sarah Slean, Great Big Sea, and Rheostatics.

Some of the artists that Swinghammer has performed with as a side-man include Peter Murphy (Bauhaus), Gregory Hoskins, Sarah Slean, Lorraine Segato, Wendy Lands, Dan Bryk, Michah Barnes, Wild Strawberries, Tory Casis, Paul Linklater, Lori Cullen and Ron Sexsmith.

In 1986, Swinghammer played bass for a short period in the seminal cow-punk band The Lawn. The following year he joined local goth-funksters Vital Sines, which included Glenn Milchem who went on to become the drummer for Blue Rodeo. He recorded on the Vital Sines EP Big Dark Dreams produced by Michael Phillip Wojewoda.

Swinghammer has been tapped as the house band guitarist for countless benefits and variety shows. Notable performers he has backed up in this context include Kevin Drew (Broken Social Scene), Emily Haines (Metric), Ed Robertson (Barenaked Ladies), Mary Margaret O’Hara, Andy Maise (Skydiggers), and Andy Kim.

== Music for film and television ==
Since co-composing the score for the feature comedy Friends, Lovers and Lunatics in 1989, he has written extensively for film and television projects. In 1991, he created the theme music for Citytv's MediaTelevision, which ran for 11 years. Other television composition credits include episodes of The Nature of Things, Canadian Made, Real Renos, Ancient Weather, The Greatest Canadian: Frederick Banting, Driven By Vision, Fanboy Confessional, and Giver. Film credits include McLuhan's Wake, The Falls, Trouble in the Peace, Acquainted with the Night, Noise, Youkali Hotel, and Ginger Snaps 2.

== Music production ==
In 1986, Swinghammer produced the first full-length indie cassette release by Ron Sexsmith There's A Way. Other artists he has produced include Mary Margaret O'Hara, Patricia O'Callaghan, and Jeremy Robinson.

== Discography ==
- This Is Culture (1984, indie cassette, self produced)
- Talking with My Hands (1985, indie cassette, self produced)
- Play (1985, indie cassette, self produced)
- Chemistry (1986, indie cassette, self produced)
- The Fair (1987, indie cassette, self produced)
- 12 (1988, indie cassette, self produced)
- Pomo-à-Gogo (1991, indie CD, self produced)
- Remote (1999, indie CD, collaboration with Andy Stochansky)
- Vostok 6 (1999, Righteous Babe Records CD, self produced)
- Black Eyed Sue (2001, indie CD, self produced)
- Augusta (2004, indie CD, produced by Ron Skinner)
- Ginger Snaps 2: Unleashed (2004, Outside Music CD, film soundtrack)
- Turpentine Wind (2011, indie CD and Blu-ray, produced by Michael Phillip Wojewoda)
- Two Portraits (2012, indie 12" 45, produced by Swinghammer)
- Another Another (2017, indie CD, produced by Swinghammer)

== Art career ==
Swinghammer exhibited watercolours when he was a teenager in Niagara Falls at local galleries, group shows and regional outdoor exhibitions. In the early 1980s, he was an active member of the Niagara Artist's Centre in St Catharines, participating in solo and group shows, and exchanges with other artist-run centres. He represented the N.A.C at the annual meeting of the Association of National non-profit Art Centres in 1983.

In 1986, he exhibited a series of large-scale works on paper at the Trent University Gallery in Peterborough, and later that year sold a piece to the Canada Council Art Bank, which remains in their permanent collection.

By the 1990s, Swinghammer shifted to commercial projects, and his output of personal work was limited. In 2006, he had a solo show at the Queen Street design space Inside Modern Living which reinvigorated his painting practice.

Swinghammer currently exhibits at INabstracto in Toronto and the True North Gallery in Waterdown, Ontario.

== Commercial art career ==
In 1985, Swinghammer did a mural at Toronto's Nutz & Boltz disco, followed by a mural at the Dance Cave, which appears in a scene in 1988's Cocktail starring Tom Cruise. He was associated with a colourful "neo-primitive" graphic style shared by a few other "street artists" and which became part of the visual identity of the Queen Street West scene. Over a period of five years he created popular fundraising t-shirt designs and posters for the legendary community radio station CKLN. Commercial projects of note from this period were posters, shopping bag design, and an in-store font for Sam the Record Man (the largest record chain in Canada at the time), designing the Canada Booth for the New Music Seminar in New York City, and designing the CASBY Award logo and set design for CFNY FM. Additional clients for his illustration and design work included Much Music, The Music Gallery, CBC Variety Recordings, Coach House Press, Environment Canada, The Art Gallery Of Ontario, HMV, BMG, Jane Siberry, and Jell-O Pudding.

Swinghammer's illustrated/designed album covers include The Shuffle Demons, David Wilcox (which received a Juno nomination for best album design – a collaboration with Michael Wrycraft), African Guitar Summit, Don Ross, and the children's entertainers Sho, Mo and the Monkey Bunch.

In the late 1980s, he added his signature visual style to numerous music videos, and art directed Out of My House Roach by the Shuffle Demons, and Let Your Backbone Slide and Drop The Needle (which received Juno and Much Music Awards) by pioneering Canadian rap artist Maestro Fresh Wes. These videos were extremely popular on Much Music, and the national exposure created opportunities for Swinghammer to art direct rap-oriented television commercials.

Swinghammer has created performing wardrobe for the Shuffle Demons, a cappella quartet The Nylons, and jugglers The Flying Dutchmen. He has created set designs for theater director William Scoular and Canadian contemporary dance icon Peggy Baker. In 2008, he did an art instruction residency at The National Ballet School. In 1996, he illustrated the children's book My Stompin’ Grounds – The Songs of Stompin Tom Connors, published by Doubleday.

Swinghammer animated the music video for Buffy Sainte-Marie's song "The War Racket" which was released on her Medicine Songs album.
