= A Neon Rome =

Canadian alternative rock band

Background information
- Origin: Toronto, Ontario, Canada
- Genres: Alternative rock
- Years active: 1984–1989, 2008
- Labels: Fringe Product, New Rose
- Past members: Neal Arbic; John Borra; Ken Burchell; Kevin Nizol; Ian Blurton; Crawford Teasdale; Bernard Maiezza

A Neon Rome was a Canadian alternative rock band, active from 1984 to 1987. Commonly described as a cross between The Sex Pistols, The Doors, and The Velvet Underground, the band were prominent on Toronto's Queen Street West music scene. They broke up before achieving mainstream success, however, and are now remembered primarily as the inspiration behind Bruce McDonald's cult film Roadkill.

== History ==
Neal Arbic, the band's frontman, created the band in 1984 after writing a narrative poem about a rock band whose music was "like heroin" to its fans. The band's sound was reportedly inspired by accidentally playing a Psychic TV record at the wrong speed.

Bassist John Borra, drummer Ken Burchell and guitarist Kevin Nizol rounded out the band's original lineup. The band began to draw attention in the Toronto club scene for its live shows, which blended Arbic's wild, charismatic frontman antics with a loose, improvisational interplay among the band. In fact, the band rarely wrote songs in advance – instead, much of its material was improvised live on stage.

Burchell left the band, who continued without a drummer for a time until Ian Blurton joined to replace him. Keyboardist Bernard Maiezza joined the band at the same time as Blurton. They eventually became the house band of Elvis Mondays, a weekly underground rock night at Toronto's Beverly Hotel, and began developing a wider audience. Eventually Blurton left the band, and Burchell rejoined.

The band released its debut album, New Heroin, in March 1987 on Fringe Product in Canada and New Rose Records in Europe, and garnered strong reviews from influential publications such as Sounds, NME and Melody Maker.

Following the release of New Heroin, Nizol left the band, and was replaced by Crawford Teasdale. At this time, as well, Bruce McDonald began to develop an idea for a concert film which would document the band on tour across Northern Ontario.

== Collapse ==
During the band's tour to promote New Heroin, Arbic became increasingly disillusioned with the music industry, and began to rebel against the promotional demands of leading a band seemingly on the verge of stardom. He shaved his head, he briefly adopted a diet consisting exclusively of almonds and raisins, he sometimes failed to show up for scheduled live shows, and he eventually took a vow of silence – while he would still sometimes agree to sing at live concerts and in recording sessions for their second album All the Children Are In, such occasions became fewer and farther between, and he strictly refused to speak offstage. Although the band completed recording All the Children Are In, the album was never released.

McDonald's proposed film instead became Roadkill, a scripted black comedy film which fictionalized A Neon Rome as "Children of Paradise", a band which disappeared on tour after its lead singer faced a similar existential crisis.

The band made a final live appearance at Toronto's Rivoli around the time of the film's release, at which Arbic whispered the lyrics instead of singing, but then broke up. Arbic embarked on a spiritual quest, regaining his mental equilibrium by following the meditation teachings of Baba Hari Dass.

Borra and Maiezza went on to join Blurton's band Change of Heart, while Nizol went on to join Pure/Love Bomber and is now a member of 66 Kicks.

Arbic has occasionally performed spoken word poetry at various Toronto concert venues, including the Elvis Mondays revival at the Drake Hotel, and has written and performed spiritual music with the band Mahendra. A Neon Rome also performed a one-off reunion show at the Elvis Monday 25th Anniversary show on December 1, 2008.

== Discography ==
- New Heroin (1987)
