= Custom Killing =

Studio album by Razor
- Released: July 1987
- Recorded: The Waxworks, St. Jacobs, Ontario, February 1987
- Genres: Thrash metal; speed metal
- Label: Fringe Product
- Producer: Terry Marostega

Razor chronology
Malicious Intent (1986)	Custom Killing (1987)	Violent Restitution (1988)

Custom Killing is the fourth studio album by the Canadian speed/thrash metal band Razor. It was released in July 1987 by Toronto based label Fringe Product. It is more of an experimental approach and was fairly overlooked upon its release. It also features "Survival of the Fittest" and "Last Rites" which are the band's longest songs ever recorded. It is the final album to feature Mike Embro on drums and Mike Campagnolo on bass (until his return on the 2022 album Cycle of Contempt).

== Track listing ==
Side A
No.	Title	Length
1.	"Survival of the Fittest"	11:05
2.	"Shootout"	4:58
3.	"Forced Annihilation"	5:02

Side B
No.	Title	Length
4.	"Last Rites"	11:06
5.	"Snake Eyes"	3:36
6.	"White Noise"	5:28
7.	"Going Under"	4:04
8.	"Russian Ballet"	0:34
Total length:		45:53

== Personnel ==
- Stace McLaren – vocals
- Dave Carlo – guitars
- Mike Campagnolo – bass
- Mike Embro – drums

=== Production ===
- Ed Bos – logo
- Dana Marostega – layout
- Terry Marostega – engineering, producer
