= Malicious Intent (album) =

Studio album by Razor
- Released: April 1986
- Recorded: 1986
- Studios: Waxworks Studios, St. Jacobs, Ontario
- Genres: Thrash metal; speed metal
- Label: Viper
- Producer: Walter Zwol

Razor chronology
Evil Invaders (1985)	Malicious Intent (1986)	Custom Killing (1987)

Professional ratings
Review scores
Source	Rating
Kerrang!	3/5 stars

Malicious Intent is the third album released in 1986 by Canadian speed/thrash metal band Razor. The album contains more honed and intense screaming from frontman Stace McLaren and the tracks on it mostly contains lyrics about heroic fantasy and playing heavy metal. An exception to this might be "Tear Me to Pieces", with lyrics penned by McLaren about knife fighting.

== Track listing ==
Side A
No.	Title	Length
1.	"Tear Me to Pieces"	2:58
2.	"Night Attack"	2:37
3.	"Grindstone"	3:02
4.	"Cage the Ragers"	3:28
5.	"Malicious Intent"	4:35

Side B
No.	Title	Length
6.	"Rebel Onslaught"	3:19
7.	"A.O.D."	3:05
8.	"Challenge the Eagle"	3:25
9.	"Stand Before Kings"	2:46
10.	"High Speed Metal"	3:34
11.	"K.M.A."	2:49
Total length:		35:38

CD bonus track
No.	Title	Length
1.	"Mosh"	1:38
Total length:		37:16

== Notes ==
- The CD releases contain a bonus track titled "Mosh", which begins with an unknown person playing the song "Jeepers Creepers" on the piano with Stace McLaren going on a swearing tirade, followed by a fast-paced measure played by the band throughout each session
- The initials for "A.O.D." stands for Angel of Death and the initials for "K.M.A." stands for Kiss My Ass

== Personnel ==
=== Musicians ===
- Stace McLaren – vocals
- Dave Carlo – guitars
- Mike Campagnolo – bass
- Mike Embro – drums

Production

- Terry Marostega – engineering
- Garnet Giesbrecht – art direction, design
- Walter Zwol – producer
- Robert Matichak – remastering
- Lindsay Lozon – photography
