= Shakespeare My Butt =

Shakespeare My Butt...

Studio album by The Lowest of the Low
- Released: December 10, 1991
- Recorded: 1991
- Genre: Indie rock
- Length: 64:25
- Label: Page Publications
- Producer: Andy Koyama

The Lowest of the Low chronology
Shakespeare My Butt... (1991)	Hallucigenia (1994)

Singles from Shakespeare My Butt
- 1. "Eternal Fatalist" Released: 1993; 2. "Salesmen, Cheats and Liars" Released: 1993

Professional ratings
Review scores
Source	Rating
Allmusic	2.5/5 stars

Shakespeare My Butt... is an album by Canadian band The Lowest of the Low, released in 1991.

Lead singer Ron Hawkins, guitarist Stephen Stanley and drummer David Alexander were previously in the band Popular Front, but when they formed The Lowest of the Low, Hawkins, who wrote all but one of the songs on the record, made a change in his songwriting for the material that would ultimately become "Shakespeare My Butt." While he had previously written material that was "about big global issues" and "places sort of far from ourselves and people that were not in our immediate circle," Hawkins began writing songs that were "much more personal, much more close to me... much more about my surroundings." He quickly saw that this material was connecting with audiences. Hawkins explained "The whole thing with Shakespeare My Butt was... a whole bunch of songs that dealt with my neighbourhood and my local bars and characters I would run into." "The Taming of Carolyn" was a Popular Front song that the Low began to perform, but the other fifteen songs that Hawkins wrote for the record were all written in a very productive six-month period.

The band had built a large catalog of material they were performing live but ran into a problem when it came time to record the material. "With Shakespeare, we went in without any money, to do demos really. A friend of ours worked at Sound By Deluxe, a film post-production house. We recorded a lot of it in Foley booths. It was by no means a professional undertaking. We'd meant to just shop it and see if we could get a record deal," Hawkins recalled. With no label interest, the band decided to make some copies of the demos for friends, then began selling copies at their gigs. When they had moved 4000 copies of the self-released album they struck a distribution deal with Page Publications (run by former Barenaked Ladies vocalist Steven Page's father Victor) and were soon moving a lot of copies at Toronto's HMV Superstore thanks, in part, to heavy radio play when CFNY began to champion the band. With thousands of copies sold and the songs on the radio, these "demos" had become "the songs." Hawkins explained: "Once the Edge [Toronto modern rock station CFNY] picked it up, it was like "well we can't go back and make the record we wanted to make. The demos are out there." Years after its release, Hawkins said "I listen to it and go, wow, the most popular record in my entire canon is the shittiest-sounding record I've made."

At the time of its release, the album briefly became the best-selling independent release in Canadian history, although it was soon eclipsed by Barenaked Ladies' The Yellow Tape. However, its melodic, jangly folk-punk has made it an enduring classic of Canadian music.

The album was remastered and re-released in 2010 on Pheromone Recordings, with an accompanying short film DVD, LowRoads, produced by the band's drummer, David Alexander.

== Legacy and influence ==
In Chart's three Best Canadian Albums of All Time polls, Shakespeare My Butt... is one of six albums to have ranked in the top ten all three times, peaking at #6 in the 2000 poll. John K. Samson of The Weakerthans wrote the album's blurb in the 2005 poll, citing it as a major influence on his own music.

The album was also ranked 84th in Bob Mersereau's 2007 book The Top 100 Canadian Albums. The album enjoyed incredible staying power and went Gold in 2008, seventeen years after its release. Hawkins explains: "It came out at a time before Soundscan, I believe. I think we sold 4,000 records off the stage before Victor Page got involved with us. I think they sold in the vicinity of 13,000 copies, but they weren't recognised as being documentable. I think in reality it probably went gold in the late '90s, but was just certified about two years ago (in 2008)."

British author John Donoghue's 2004 book Shakespeare My Butt!, a humorous travel memoir of quirky destinations in Great Britain, also took its name from the album; Donoghue acknowledges the band's influence in the book, and the cover features a blindfolded image of William Shakespeare in homage to the blindfolded band photo on the album cover.

Two songs from the album ("Letter from Bilbao", "For the Hand of Magdalena") are featured in virtual museum dedicated to the Spanish Civil War. Vocalist Ron Hawkins offers commentary on the songs' origins and inspirations on this museum's website. The Clash and Manic Street Preachers are other artists featured in the museum.

== Track listing ==
All songs written by Ron Hawkins, except where noted.

1. "4 O'Clock Stop" – 3:28
2. "So Long Bernie" – 3:55
3. "Just About 'The Only' Blues" – 4:29
4. "Salesmen, Cheats and Liars" – 3:28
5. "Rosy and Grey" – 5:03
6. "Kinda the Lonely One" – 2:51
7. "Eternal Fatalist" – 3:28
8. "For the Hand of Magdalena" – 3:35
9. "Subversives" – 3:14
10. "Bleed a Little While Tonight" – 5:17
11. "Bloodline" (Stephen Stanley) – 3:43
12. "St. Brendan's Way" – 4:10
13. "Letter from Bilbao" – 2:08
14. "Under the Carlaw Bridge" – 4:11
15. "The Taming of Carolyn" – 4:16
16. "Gossip Talkin' Blues" – 3:25
17. "Henry Needs a New Pair of Shoes" – 3:44

Cassette Tape (Canada)

1. "4 O'Clock Stop" – 3:28
2. "So Long Bernie" – 3:55
3. "Just About 'The Only' Blues" – 4:29
4. "Salesmen, Cheats and Liars" – 3:28
5. "The Taming of Carolyn" – 4:16
6. "Eternal Fatalist" – 3:28
7. "For the Hand of Magdalena" – 3:35
8. "Subversives" – 3:14
9. "Bleed a Little While Tonight" – 5:17
10. "Bloodline" – 3:43
11. "St. Brendan's Way" – 4:10
12. "Under the Carlaw Bridge" – 4:11
13. "Rosy and Grey" – 5:03
14. "Gossip Talkin' Blues" – 3:25
15. "Henry Needs a New Pair of Shoes" – 3:44
