= Big Rude Jake =

Canadian musician (1963–2022)

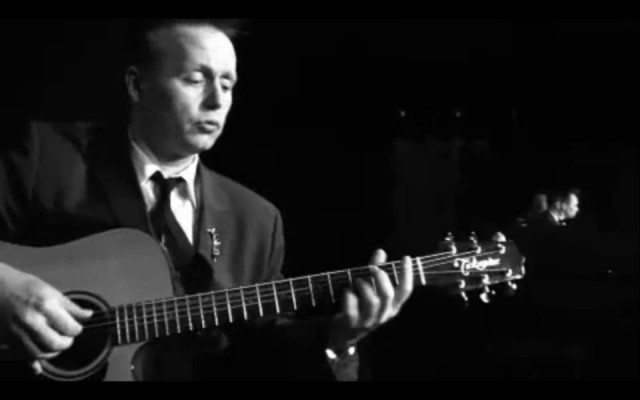

Background information
- Also known as: Chet Valiant, Jackson Hubby
- Born: Andrew Jacob Hiebert; March 1, 1963; St. Catharines, Ontario, Canada
- Died: June 16, 2022 (aged 59) Hamilton, Ontario, Canada
- Genres: Neo-swing; blues; jazz; rockabilly
- Occupations: Singer, musician, songwriter
- Instruments: Vocals, guitar
- Years active: 1990–2022
- Labels: Big Rude; Pivotal; Roadrunner
- Formerly of: Tennessee Voodoo Coupe, Blue Mercury Coupe
- Spouse: Anna-Lisa Seeliger (m. 2009)
- Website: bigrudejake.ca

Andrew Jacob Hiebert (1 March 1963 – 16 June 2022), known professionally as Big Rude Jake, was a Canadian songwriter, singer, musician, and bandleader based in Toronto. The original "Swing Punk", he was associated with the neo-swing trend of the 1990s. Jake was drawn to the roots of American music, and incorporated elements of jazz, blues, gospel, jump, and rockabilly, among others. His finger picking ragtime guitar style was inspired by the likes of Mose Scarlet and Leon Redbone.

Jake stepped away from recording and touring for several years, during which time he began practicing Zen Buddhism. He returned in 2009 with a new album, Quicksand. He started touring Canada and Europe again in 2010, as well as playing in the United States.

== Biography ==
Jake grew up in the Regional Municipality of Niagara. In high school, he moved from St. Catharines to Niagara Falls, Ontario, where his parents took over his grandparents' business. It became the celebrated "Jake's Chip Wagon".

After completing an honours degree in history at Conrad Grebel University College and University of Waterloo, he moved to Toronto with a passion for music, and writing lyrics and poetry. Picking up work at places like Sneaky Dee's, he dove deeply into the local music scene, connecting with a large and diverse array of artists, crossing genres from jazz and lounge to rockabilly and punk.

Butane Fumes & Bad Cologne, the first record by Big Rude Jake and his Gentlemen Players, was recorded in 2 days, on 26 and 27 July 1993 in Toronto. With what the group described as a "ridiculous puny budget", the idea was to record "live off the floor, just like the old cats did". The album was produced by Gordie Johnson of local rock act Big Sugar and Pete Prilesnick. The executive producer was Michael L. Johnson.

Blue Pariah, the second album, followed in 1996, and "Swing Baby!" was aired in college radios across Canada and United States. It was also produced by Gordie Johnson, and engineered by Prilesnik. Blue Pariah also featured Ashley MacIsaac on violin. This album was deliberately designed to set Big Rude Jake apart from all the other bands on the swing scene. It uses what some thought to be rather elaborate production techniques.

Seeking to get this record distributed in the US, Big Rude Jake left Toronto, establishing himself in Brooklyn, New York, where he signed a record deal with Roadrunner Records. A third album, Big Rude Jake, was released in 1999.

In 2002, he recorded a fourth album, Live Faust, Die Jung, which is totally different from the first three. It was produced by Jake Langley and Big Rude Jake, but was never officially released, as he was badly injured one night after being struck by a taxi. He 'disappeared' from the public eye for a while, going into semi-retirement. When he began playing publicly again, he used the moniker Chet Valiant, stepping back from the "big suit party animal persona" of Big Rude Jake. Maintaining a lower profile, he focused on honing his ragtime guitar skills and kept composing. He began to play a few shows as Big Rude Jake again in 2006.

With Kyree Vibrant, Jake made the award-winning film, Big Rude Jake: Pursuing the Pearl of Great Price.

He released the album Quicksand at Hugh's Room in September 2009, and returned to touring.

On the side, Jake recorded albums and toured with his other bands, Tennessee Voodoo Coupe (Rockabilly) and Blue Mercury Coupe (Retro Punk).

His European tours inspired him to make a new jump blues influenced live album with his 7-piece band and special guests. Live & Out Loud was recorded in November 2011 in front of a live audience at The Drake Hotel in Toronto, funded in large part by fans through the crowdfunding platform RocketHub.

By day, Hiebert continued to play music for seniors and others in long term care, as he had done for many years.

In 2014, Jake launched his ongoing charity event, Blues For the Red Door, in support of The Red Door Shelter.

Continuing his work in music respite care, in 2020, he made Fanfare Music Enrichment Services official, serving intellectually challenged clients online and in person. He also began a series of weekly live concerts on Facebook.

Jake was working on another album, "The Jackhammer Sessions". He died on 16 June 2022 at the age of 59 from metastatic small-cell carcinoma of the bladder. He was married and had one child.

== Discography ==
Big Rude Jake

- Butane Fumes & Bad Cologne (Spanky Productions, 1993) As Big Rude Jake And His Gentleman Players
- Live 23-12-94 (No label, 1995) Cassette only, recorded live at Lee's Palace
- Blue Pariah (Spanky Productions, 1996)
- Big Rude Jake (Roadrunner, 1999)
- Live Faust, Die Jung (Big Rude Records, 2002)
- Brooklyn Blue (Pivotal, 2004)
- Defiance (Big Rude Records, 2007) Reissue of 1999 album Big Rude Jake
- Quicksand (Big Rude Records, 2009)
- Live & Out Loud (No label, 2012) As Big Rude Jake And The Jump City Crusaders
- Big Rude Bootleg aka Big Rude Jake's Christmas Bootleg (No Label) as Big Rude Jake & The Gentlemen Players, a reissue of Live 23-12-94

Tennessee Voodoo Coupe

- Live in Person Radio Transcripts (No Label, 2011)
- Over the Moon (No label, 2013)

Blue Mercury Coupe

- Band of the Future (No label, 2013)
