= Hallucigenia (album) =

Studio album by The Lowest of the Low
- Released: March 16, 1994
- Recorded: at Vancouver Studios
- Genre: Indie rock
- Length: 59:01
- Label: Yes Boy Records/A&M
- Producer: Don Smith

The Lowest of the Low chronology
Shakespeare My Butt (1991)	Hallucigenia (1994)	Nothing Short of a Bullet (2002)

Professional ratings
Review scores
Source	Rating
Allmusic	1.5/5 stars

Hallucigenia is an album by Canadian band The Lowest of the Low, released in 1994. It was the band's first release distributed by a major record label until 2018, when the band signed with Warner Music Canada.

The album reveals the source of the band's name, opening with a clip of former President of the United States George H. W. Bush stating "We do not want to be the lowest of the low. We are not a nation in decline."

The album was recorded in 1993 with producer Don Smith, but its release was delayed several months as the band sorted out the details of their contract with A&M Records. Smith brought an impressive pedigree to the project having produced records for Keith Richards, The Tragically Hip and 54-40 but the band and Smith never gelled with lead singer Ron Hawkins having serious issues with him. According to the band, Don Smith had made blatantly racist comments very early in the recording sessions that had incensed Hawkins. "We had a horrible time working with him. We had some major political differences with him. I called our manager and said “What happens if I punch the producer in the face? They were like “We just paid him seventy-thousand dollars so you’re with him for another 30 days.” In addition, Smith was distracted by planning his next project and would periodically leave the sessions, and ultimately left the sessions prior to completion. Despite the differences, the album had a heavier rock and roll sound. "Smith added some crunch and heft to the band's heavier rock songs. "Motel 30" and "Eating the Rich" definitely benefitted from Smith's influence, while earworms in "Pistol" and "Gamble" became staples on local radio."

The album peaked at #37 in the RPM album charts; however, it was not as well received by audiences or critics as Shakespeare My Butt. The band was also riven by significant internal tensions, and broke up barely a few months after Hallucigenia's release. The band subsequently reunited in 2000, and issued the live album Nothing Short of a Bullet in 2002.

== Singles ==
"City Full of Cowards" was released as a CD single, with the non-album B-sides "Bit" and "Crying Like a Postcard".

"Motel 30" was also released as a CD single, with the non-album B-side "The Unbearable Lightness of Jean (Live)" and "Motel 30 (Live)". Both live tracks were recorded on February 5, 1994 at Lee's Palace in Toronto for CBC Radio's Hot Ticket. "Motel 30 (Live)" was the only b-side not to be included on the 2018 reissue.

"Gamble" was the album's other main single, with the album track "Night of the Living Assholes" as its B-side. An early version of the song "Gamble" produced by Bob Wiseman was released in 1993 on the CFNY radio station compilation "CFNY The New Music Search 1993" (NMFCD 1).

== Guests ==
Art Bergmann appears as a guest musician on "Beer, Graffiti Walls". He is the subject of the song "Life Imitates Art", and is referenced in the lyrics to "Pistol" alongside Joe Strummer, Black Flag and Billy Bragg. The band's manager at the time knew Bergmann and arranged the cameo: "So we met Art when he came in to do that with Hallucigenia and we just became friends." The "graffiti" that Bergmann quotes in the track is actually taken from a real "beer graffiti wall." "That song was partially about this place called Sneaky Dee’s (Toronto). That’s where the Lowest Of The Low used to hang out til all hours of the night, all the time, so I pulled most of the stuff that’s in that spoken word off the graffiti in the bathroom there. We wanted to get him to just spew it out. I thought Art’s perfect for that, he’ll give it a nasty turn."

== Track listing ==
All songs by Ron Hawkins, except where noted.

1. "Pistol" - 4:31
2. "That Song About Trees and Kites" - Hawkins/Kathleen Olmstead - 2:26
3. "City Full of Cowards" - 4:03
4. "Eating the Rich" - 4:05
5. "Gamble" - 4:49
6. "Dogs of February" - Stephen Stanley - 4:34
7. "Black Monday" - 5:14
8. "Beer, Graffiti Walls" - 5:25
9. "7th Birthday" - 4:15
10. "Penedono's Hand" - Stanley - 3:21
11. "Life Imitates Art" - 3:34
12. "Last, Lost Generation" - 3:46
13. "Motel 30" - 3:05
14. "Night of the Living Assholes" - 5:52

2018 Reissue Bonus Tracks

1. "Crying Like a Postcard"
2. "Bit"
3. "The Unbearable Lightness of Jean (Live)"
