= C'mon (band) =

Canadian rock band

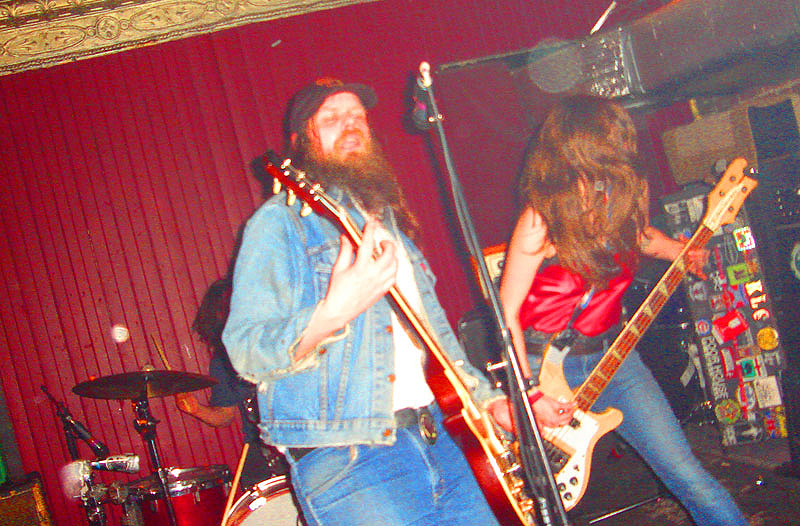
- C'mon on stage in 2006

Background information
- Origin: Toronto, Ontario, Canada
- Genres: Alternative rock
- Years active: 2003–2011
- Past members: Ian Blurton; Katie Lynn Campbell; Randy Curnew; Dean Dallas Bentley

C'mon was a Canadian rock band based in Toronto, known for its explosive live shows. The core members were Ian Blurton on guitar and vocals, and Katie Lynn Campbell (formerly of Nashville Pussy) on bass and vocals and with Randy Curnew and later Dean Dallas Bentley on drums.

== History ==
The band was formed in 2003 by Blurton, Campbell and Curnew, and released an album of strident rock music, Midnight is the Answer, in 2004.

C'mon toured about Canada in 2005, travelling as far as Charlottetown. In 2006, the band toured across Canada again, including a performance in Winnipeg. By that time the group had released four albums, including In the Heat of the Moment, which received airplay on campus and community radio.

In 2007, the band performed at the Hillside Festival in Guelph, Ontario.

The band's 2010 album, Beyond the Pale Horse, appeared on the national Earshot Radio Chart Top 50 in 2011.

Curnew left the band and was replaced by Dean Dallas Bentley on drums. C'mon disbanded in 2011.

== Discography ==
=== Albums ===
- Midnight Is the Answer (2004)
- In the Heat of the Moment (2005)
- Bottled Lightning of an All-Time High (2007)
- Beyond the Pale Horse (2010)

=== EPs ===
- C'mon (2004)
- Drums Tour (2005)
- Bass Tour (2006)
- The Mountain (2010)

=== Singles ===
- "City of Daggers" (2009)
- "Peaches Bathroom" (2009)
