= The Lowest of the Low =

Canadian musical group

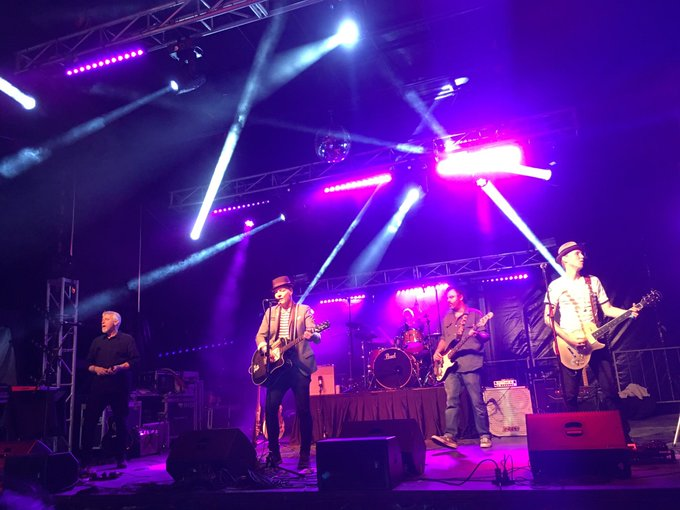
- The Lowest of the Low performing in 2018

Background information
- Origin: Toronto, Ontario, Canada
- Genres: Alternative rock, Jangle pop
- Years active: 1991–1994, 2000–2007, 2010–present
- Labels: 1991-1994 A&M; 2002-2004 MapleMusic Recordings; 2017-2018 Pheromone Recordings; 2019-2021 Warner Music Canada; 2022 Sonic Envy
- Members: Ron Hawkins; David Alexander; Lawrence Nichols; Greg Smith; Michael McKenzie
- Past members: Stephen Stanley; John Arnott; Dylan Parker; Brian MacMillan
- Website: lowestofthelow.com

The Lowest of the Low is a Canadian alternative rock group formed in 1991 from Toronto, Ontario, Canada. They were one of the most influential bands on the Canadian alternative music scene in the early 1990s, garnering widespread critical acclaim and radio play. Their most successful album, Shakespeare My Butt, was later named one of the ten greatest albums in Canadian music history in three successive reader polls by the music magazine Chart, as well as being ranked as the 84th greatest Canadian album of all time in Bob Mersereau's book The Top 100 Canadian Albums.

== History ==
The band was formed by Ron Hawkins, Stephen Stanley and David Alexander, all members of the band Popular Front, as a side project at a time when their other band was going through internal tensions that eventually led to its breakup. While performing as a trio in folk clubs, they met John Arnott, who became the band's fourth member. The band's punk-inspired jangle pop quickly became a popular draw on the Queen Street West club circuit in Toronto. They submitted the songs "Gamble" and "Motel 30", produced by Bob Wiseman, to the $100,000 CFNY Discovery to Disc contest in 1991.

In 1991, they released their debut album, Shakespeare My Butt, on Page Publications. The album featured songs they had already performed and toured for several years as Popular Front. Hawkins's songs were filled with lyrics about Marxism and the Spanish Civil War, but also contained many references to Toronto landmarks like the Don River, Bathurst Street, and his local pub, "The Only" on Danforth Avenue. The album became one of the best-selling independent releases in Canadian history, selling just short of gold status, and was later named one of the ten greatest albums in Canadian music history by the music magazine Chart.

However, the band also resisted some of the compromises and demands of the music industry; most notably, they played an early industry A&R show wearing T-shirts that read "Don't suck corporate cock" and "Corporate rock still sucks".

In 1993, the band signed a distribution deal with A&M Records, and released Hallucigenia in 1994. They toured to support the album and had begun early preparations for their follow-up album, but creative and business tensions resulted in the band breaking up later the same year. Hawkins released a solo album, The Secret of My Excess, in 1996 before forming Ron Hawkins and the Rusty Nails.

== Reunions ==
In 2000, The Lowest of the Low reunited for a five-show tour, playing to sold-out venues in Toronto and Buffalo. In January 2002, the live album Nothing Short of a Bullet was released. The album also featured a second disc with three new studio songs, including a cover of the Bad Religion song "Kerosene".

In 2002, bassist John Arnott left the band and was replaced by Dylan Parker. In 2004, the band signed with MapleMusic Recordings. The same year, the band released Sordid Fiction, their first new studio album since 1994. Following the tour for that record, the band went on extended hiatus again.

In November 2007, the band announced that they were breaking up for good. They played two final shows, one on December 4, 2007, at the Horseshoe Tavern in Toronto and another on December 8, 2007, at Club Infinity in Williamsville, New York. This concert was released by fans of the band as a DVD, incorporating several camcorder recordings of the show and a soundboard audio patch. The fan released DVD was entitled Into the Black, and can be downloaded on Ron Hawkins' web site.

In December 2010, the band reunited again for a Massey Hall sold-out show plus two nights at Lee's Palace in Toronto to celebrate the release of a new remastered edition of Shakespeare My Butt on Pheromone Recordings. They also announced plans for a tour in 2011 to mark the 20th anniversary of the album.

On December 6, 2011, the band performed a surprise set at the 30th anniversary party for The Only, the pub that inspired the song "Just About 'The Only' Blues" on their first album.

The Lowest of the Low made plans to record their fourth album in the fall of 2013, although the departure of founding member Stephen Stanley halted these plans.

In November 2015, they released two new songs, "The Kids Are All Wrong" and "In the Blink of an Eye", with new guitarist Brian Macmillan replacing Stanley. In 2017, they released Do the Right Now, their first album of new material since 2004's Sordid Fiction.

In 2018, the band released a career-spanning vinyl LP box set called Shakespeare...My Box. It re-released their 4 studio albums, as well as including a new collection of B-sides, live tracks, and remixes, called Thrifty, Thrifty, Thrifty.

Their next studio album, Agitpop, was released in 2019. In 2021, they followed up with Taverns and Palaces, a live album collecting recorded performances from Lee's Palace and the Horseshoe Tavern.

In 2023, they released Welcome to the Plunderdome, which was their first album in their entire career to be collectively self-produced by the band.

== Influence ==
The Lowest of the Low have been cited as a major influence by The Weakerthans, whose leader John K. Samson was previously a member of Propagandhi when the latter covered TLotL's song "Gamble". The Lowest of the Low have actually repaid the favour to The Weakerthans by singing about attending one of their concerts in the song "A Casual Overdose". Covers of Lowest of the Low songs by other artists include "Rosy and Grey" by Weddings Parties Anything and "Bleed a Little While Tonight" by Jeremy Fisher.

== Members ==
- Ron Hawkins (vocals, guitar)
- Lawrence Nichols (keyboards, harmonica, acoustic guitar, vocals)
- David Alexander (drums)
- Greg Smith (bass)
- Michael McKenzie (guitar)

=== Past members ===
- John Arnott (bass)
- Stephen Stanley (guitar, vocals)
- Dylan Parker (bass)
- Brian MacMillan (guitar)

== Discography ==
=== Albums ===
- Shakespeare My Butt (1991)
- Hallucigenia (1994)
- Nothing Short of a Bullet (2002)
- Sordid Fiction (2004)
- Do the Right Now (2017)
- Agitpop (2019)
- Taverns and Palaces (2021)
- Welcome to the Plunderdome (2023)
- Over Years and Overnight (2025)

=== Collections ===
- Shakespeare My Box (Box Set) (2018)

=== Singles ===
- "Eternal Fatalist" (1993)
- "Salesmen, Cheats and Liars" (1993)
- "City Full of Cowards" b/w "Crying Like a Postcard", "Bit" (1993)
- "Gamble" b/w "Night of the Living Assholes" (1994)
- "Motel 30" b/w "The Unbearable Lightness of Jean", "Motel 30 (Live)" (1994)
- "(These are) The Lives and Times" (2001)
- "Kinda the Lonely One" [live] (2001)
- "New Westminster Taxi Squad" (2002)
- "The Kids Are All Wrong" b/w "In The Blink of An Eye" (2015)
- "Powerlines" (digital only) (2017)

== See also ==
- Music of Canada
- Canadian rock
- List of Canadian musicians
- List of bands from Canada
- Category:Canadian musical groups
