= Ron Hawkins =

Canadian musician

Ronald James Hawkins
- Born: November 29, 1964 (age 61); Toronto, Ontario

Ronald James Hawkins is a musician from Toronto who is best known as a member of the band The Lowest of the Low. He has also released music as a solo artist, and fronted the bands Ron Hawkins and the Rusty Nails and Ron Hawkins and the Do Good Assassins. He has produced albums for multiple independent bands and artists and is also an accomplished painter.

== Career ==
The Lowest of the Low sold over 100,000 copies of their two independent releases, Shakespeare My Butt and Hallucigenia. Shakespeare My Butt was voted by Canadians as one of the Top 10 Canadian Albums of all time by Chart magazine. The band broke up in 1994.

After The Lowest of the Low broke up, Hawkins formed The Leisure Demons with former Squirrel drummer Stephen Keeping. The Leisure Demons recorded a four-song demo containing songs that were later recorded by his next band, The Rusty Nails. In 1995, he released his first solo album, The Secret of My Excess. The musicians on this release—Lawrence Nichols (vocals), Christopher Plock (saxophones), Michael Kaler (a.k.a. Blitz) (bass)—soon became known as The Rusty Nails, and were joined by Rob Fenton (saxophone, violin), and Mark Hansen (drums). Mark Hansen was a member of the Toronto band Dig Circus, which was mentioned in a Lowest of the Low song. The Rusty Nails spent much of 1996 and 1997 touring in support of The Secret of My Excess. In September 1998, their first album, Greasing the Star Machine, was released independently, and was followed by Crackstatic in 2000.

The band supported Billy Bragg, The Violent Femmes, Cracker, and Big Sugar on tours.

In 2000, The Lowest of the Low reunited. They performed a reunion tour, which resulted in the live album Nothing Short of a Bullet. They later recorded another album, Sordid Fiction, before splitting up again in 2007. The Lowest of the Low continue to play sporadic shows to this day, including a tour celebrating the 20th anniversary of their most famous album, Shakespeare My Butt, which culminated at Massey Hall on May 7, 2011. The band reformed again and recorded Do the Right Now in September 2017 and Agitpop in 2019.

Exclaim! magazine, writing about the album 10 Kinds of Lonely (2009), notes that "the spontaneous results confirm his status as one of our best wordsmiths". Bob Wiseman joined him on keyboards to perform the record live.

In 2011, he formed a new band, the Do Good Assassins. They released a double CD, Rome, in 2012 and Garden Songs in 2015.

The song "Peace and Quiet" from Garden Songs was played prior to every home game at Air Canada Centre for the Toronto Maple Leafs for the 2015–16 and 2016–17 seasons.

Hawkins's sixth solo album, Spit Sputter and Sparkle, was released in 2016 on Pheromone Recordings.

In 2020, with Canada and much of the world in lockdown because of the coronavirus pandemic, Hawkins began hosting live shows broadcast from his living room for fans to watch. Dubbed "Tommy Douglas Tuesdays" (named in tribute to Tommy Douglas for his role in bringing universal health care to Canada), the weekly shows saw Hawkins play every song in his entire catalog before moving on to request nights and themed evenings.

== Discography ==
=== The Lowest of the Low ===
- Shakespeare My Butt (1991)
- Hallucigenia (1994)
- Nothing Short of a Bullet (2001)
- Sordid Fiction (2004)
- Do the Right Now (2017)
- Thrifty Thrifty Thrifty (2018)
- AgitPop (2019)
- Welcome to the Plunderdome (2023)

=== Ron Hawkins and the Rusty Nails ===
- Greasing the Star Machine (1998)
- Crackstatic (2000)
- Airports of the World EP (2001)

=== Solo ===
- The Secret of My Excess (1996)
- Hey Valerie EP (1996)
- Chemical Sounds (2007)
- 10 Kinds of Lonely (2009)
- Straitjacket Love (2011)
- Spit Sputter and Sparkle (2016)
- Trash Talkin' at the Speed of Sound (2023)

=== Ron Hawkins and the Do Good Assassins ===
- Rome (2012)
- Garden Songs (2015)
- 246 (2020)
