= Fringe Product =

Canadian independent record label

- Founded: ?
- Founder: Ben Hoffman
- Status: Defunct
- Genre: Punk; Heavy metal Death metal Electronic; Industrial
- Country of origin: Canada

Fringe Product (or Fringe Records) is a defunct Canadian independent record label which was owned by Ben Hoffman. Genres on the label included punk, rock, metal, hardcore, death metal, industrial and electronic music. Hoffman was also proprietor of Record Peddler Distribution (specializing in UK and US imports) and The Record Peddler from the late 1970s to the year 2000.

Acts on the Fringe Product label included HYPE, Dirty Rotten Imbeciles, Dayglo Abortions, Guilt Parade, Teenage Head, A Neon Rome, Breeding Ground, Sacrifice, Slaughter, Corpus Vile, Razor, Vital Sines, UIC, TBA, Sudden Impact, YouthYouthYouth, The Demics, Change of Heart, Bunchofuckingoofs and Random Killing. Fringe Product is also noteworthy for licensing bands such as Bad Brains, Dead Kennedys, Butthole Surfers, Killdozer, Rapeman, Jello Biafra, Die Kreuzen, Corrosion of Conformity, Gang Green, Swans, and Black Flag for distribution in Canada via Record Peddler Distribution.

Fringe usually released albums and mini-lps in two formats at once. First on vinyl and cassette, then on CD and cassette. The first CDs came out in the winter of 1987-1988, but they were re-releases of big sellers like Forward to Termination. The last vinyl was the Disciples of Power Powertrap LP, which was released at the beginning of April 1990.

== Obscenity charges ==
In 1988, obscenity charges were laid against Fringe Product and Record Peddler, on the basis of their distribution of two albums by Dayglo Abortions. It was the first time that the Canadian obscenity laws, established in 1959, were used against a record label. A jury cleared the companies of the charges in a trial in November 1990.

== See also ==
- List of record labels
