= The Tragically Hip discography =

- Studio albums: 13
- Extended plays: 2
- Live albums: 2
- Compilation albums: 2
- Singles: 63
- Video albums: 5
- Music videos: 32
- Box sets: 1

This is the discography of Canadian rock band the Tragically Hip. They have released 13 studio albums, two live albums, two compilation albums, two extended plays, 63 singles, a boxed set, five video albums and 32 music videos.

There is also a series of live albums, sold exclusively through their website under the title "Live from the Vault".

== Albums ==
=== Studio albums ===
Title	Details	Chart peak positions					Certifications (sales thresholds)
Title	Details	CAN	AUS	NL	US	US Heat	Certifications (sales thresholds)
Up to Here	Release date: September 5, 1989; Label: MCA Records	9	—	—	170	—	MC: Diamond
Road Apples	Release date: February 19, 1991; Label: MCA Records	1	—	—	—	—	MC: Diamond
Fully Completely	Release date: October 6, 1992; Label: MCA Records	1	96	72	—	40	MC: Diamond
Day for Night	Release date: September 19, 1994; Label: MCA Records	1	—	70	—	—	MC: 7× Platinum
Trouble at the Henhouse	Release date: May 7, 1996; Label: MCA Records	1	—	80	134	7	MC: 8× Platinum
Phantom Power	Release date: July 14, 1998; Label: Universal Music Canada	1	—	—	143	3	MC: 8× Platinum
Music @ Work	Release date: June 6, 2000; Label: Universal Music Canada	1	—	—	139	8	MC: 2× Platinum
In Violet Light	Release date: June 11, 2002; Label: Universal Music Canada	2	—	—	169	6	MC: Platinum
In Between Evolution	Release date: June 29, 2004; Label: Universal Music Canada	1	—	—	—	18	MC: Platinum
World Container	Release date: October 17, 2006; Label: Universal Music Canada	2	—	—	—	11	MC: Platinum
We Are the Same	Release date: April 7, 2009; Label: Universal Music Canada	1	—	—	148	3	MC: Platinum
Now for Plan A	Release date: October 2, 2012; Label: Universal Music Canada	3	—	—	129	3	MC: Gold
Man Machine Poem	Release date: June 17, 2016; Label: Universal Music Canada	1	—	—	179	3	MC: Gold
"—" denotes releases that did not chart.

=== Compilation albums ===
Title	Details	Chart positions	Certifications (sales thresholds)
Title	Details	CAN	Certifications (sales thresholds)
Yer Favourites	Release date: November 8, 2005; Label: Universal Music Canada	1	MC: Diamond

=== Live albums ===
Title	Details	Chart positions	Certifications (sales thresholds)
Title	Details	CAN	Certifications (sales thresholds)
Live Between Us	Release date: May 20, 1997; Label: MCA Records	1	MC: 4× Platinum
Live at the Roxy	Release date: June 24, 2022; Label: Universal Music Canada	5	
The Tragically Hip: Live July 22 – August 20, 2016	Release date: August 21, 2026; Label: MCA Records	46	

=== Box sets ===
Title	Details	Chart positions	Certifications (sales thresholds)
Title	Details	CAN	Certifications (sales thresholds)
Hipeponymous	Release date: November 1, 2005; Label: Universal Music Canada	4	MC: Platinum

== Extended plays ==
Title	Details	Peak chart positions	Certifications
Title	Details	CAN	Certifications
The Tragically Hip	Release date: 1987; Label: MCA	72	MC: 3× Platinum
Saskadelphia	Release date: May 21, 2021; Label: Universal Music Canada	2	

== Singles ==
Year	Title	Peak chart positions					Certifications	Album
Year	Title	CAN	CAN Rock/Alt	CAN Content (Cancon)	US Main. Rock	US Alt	Certifications	Album
1987	"Small Town Bringdown"	—	×	—	—	—		The Tragically Hip EP
1988	"Highway Girl"	—	×	—	—	—		The Tragically Hip EP
1988	"Last American Exit"	—	×	—	—	—		The Tragically Hip EP
1989	"Blow at High Dough"	48	×	1	—	—		Up to Here
1989	"New Orleans Is Sinking"	70	×	1	30	—		Up to Here
1990	"Boots or Hearts"	41	×	1	—	—		Up to Here
1990	"38 Years Old"	41	×	—	—	—		Up to Here
1991	"Little Bones"	11	×	—	—	—		Road Apples
1991	"Three Pistols"	59	×	1	43	—		Road Apples
1991	"Twist My Arm"	22	×	3	—	—		Road Apples
1991	"Long Time Running"	55	×	—	—	—		Road Apples
1991	"On the Verge"	77	×	7	—	—		Road Apples
1991	"Cordelia"	—	×	—	—	—		Road Apples
1992	"Locked in the Trunk of a Car"	11	×	—	—	—		Fully Completely
1993	"Fifty Mission Cap"	40	×	—	—	—		Fully Completely
1993	"Courage (for Hugh MacLennan)"	10	×	—	16	16		Fully Completely
1993	"At the Hundredth Meridian"	18	×	—	—	—		Fully Completely
1993	"Looking for a Place to Happen"	51	×	—	—	—		Fully Completely
1993	"Fully Completely"	65	×	—	—	—		Fully Completely
1994	"Grace, Too"	11	×	—	—	—		Day for Night
1994	"Greasy Jungle"	8	×	5	—	—		Day for Night
1995	"Nautical Disaster"	26	×	×	—	—		Day for Night
1995	"So Hard Done By"	64	4	×	—	—		Day for Night
1995	"Scared"	57	—	×	—	—		Day for Night
1996	"Thugs"	81	—	×	—	—		Day for Night
1996	"Ahead by a Century"	1	1	×	—	—	MC: 5× Platinum	Trouble at the Henhouse
1996	"Gift Shop"	4	17	×	—	—		Trouble at the Henhouse
1996	"700 Ft. Ceiling"	22	—	×	—	—		Trouble at the Henhouse
1997	"Flamenco"	12	20	×	—	—		Trouble at the Henhouse
1997	"Springtime in Vienna"	11	12	×	—	—		Trouble at the Henhouse
1997	"Don't Wake Daddy (Live)"	—	—	×	—	—		Live Between Us
1998	"Poets"	4	1	×	39	—		Phantom Power
1998	"Something On"	80	3	×	—	—		Phantom Power
1998	"Fireworks"	9	—	×	—	—		Phantom Power
1999	"Bobcaygeon"	3	2	×	—	—		Phantom Power
2000	"My Music at Work"	47	2	×	—	—		Music @ Work
2000	"Lake Fever"	—	6	×	—	—		Music @ Work
2000	"Freak Turbulence"	—	×	×	—	—		Music @ Work
2002	"It's a Good Life If You Don't Weaken"	26	×	×	—	—		In Violet Light
2002	"Silver Jet"	—	×	×	—	—		In Violet Light
2002	"The Darkest One"	—	×	×	—	—		In Violet Light
2004	"Vaccination Scar"	23	2	×	—	—		In Between Evolution
2004	"It Can't Be Nashville Every Night"	—	16	×	—	—		In Between Evolution
2005	"Gus: The Polar Bear from Central Park"	—	23	×	—	—		In Between Evolution
2005	"No Threat"	—	4	×	—	—		Yer Favourites
2006	"In View"	—	1	×	—	—		World Container
2006	"The Lonely End of the Rink"	—	6	×	—	—		World Container
2006	"Yer Not the Ocean"	—	7	×	—	—		World Container
2007	"Family Band"	—	18	×	—	—		World Container
2009	"Love Is a First"	22	2	×	—	—		We Are the Same
2009	"Morning Moon"	—	—	×	—	—		We Are the Same
2009	"Speed River"	—	—	×	—	—		We Are the Same
2012	"At Transformation"	63	1	×	—	—		Now for Plan A
2012	"Streets Ahead"	—	25	×	—	—		Now for Plan A
2014	"Radio Show"	—	29	×	—	—		Fully Completely (2014 reissue)
2016	"In a World Possessed by the Human Mind"	—	6	×	—	—		Man Machine Poem
2016	"Tired as Fuck"	—	—	×	—	—		Man Machine Poem
2016	"What Blue"	—	—	×	—	—		Man Machine Poem
2021	"Ouch"	68	3	—	—	—		Saskadelphia
2021	"Not Necessary"	—	21	—	—	—		Saskadelphia
2021	"Montreal"	—	—	—	—	—		Saskadelphia
2023	"Bumblebee"	—	34	—	—	—		Phantom Power (2023 reissue)
2024	"Get Back Again"	—	20	—	—	—		Up to Here (2024 reissue)
"—" denotes releases that did not chart. "×" denotes periods where charts did not exist or were not archived.

== Other songs ==
- "Land" (with Crash Vegas, Hothouse Flowers, Midnight Oil and Daniel Lanois)
- "Oh Honey" (Men with Brooms (soundtrack) - 2002)
- "Silver Road" (with Sarah Harmer, Men with Brooms (soundtrack) - 2002)
- "Ultra Mundane" (In Violet Light digital download – 2002)
- "Problem Bears" (In Violet Light digital download – 2002)
- "Forest Edge" (In Violet Light digital download – 2002)
- "Black Day in July" (Beautiful: A Tribute to Gordon Lightfoot – 2003)
- "Night Is for Getting" (In Between Evolution iTunes bonus track – 2004)
- "Hush" (We Are the Same iTunes bonus track – 2009)
- "Skeleton Park" (We Are the Same Telus Mobility bonus track – 2009)

== Videography ==
=== Video releases ===
Title	Details	Certifications
Heksenketel	Release date: 1993 (VHS); 2014 (DVD included in Fully Completely Super Deluxe Edition)	MC: Gold
That Night in Toronto	Release date: November 8, 2005 (DVD)	MC: 5× Platinum
Bobcaygeon	Release date: 2012 (DVD, Blu-ray)	MC: Gold
Long Time Running	Release date: November 2017 (DVD, Blu-ray)	MC: Platinum
A National Celebration	Release date: December 8, 2017 (DVD, Blu-ray)	MC: Platinum

=== Music videos ===
Year	Title	Album
1987	"Small Town Bringdown"	The Tragically Hip (EP)
1988	"Last American Exit"	The Tragically Hip (EP)
1989	"Blow at High Dough"	Up to Here
1989	"New Orleans Is Sinking"	Up to Here
1991	"Little Bones"	Road Apples
1992	"Locked in the Trunk of a Car"	Fully Completely
1993	"Courage (for Hugh MacLennan)"	Fully Completely
1993	"At the Hundredth Meridian"	Fully Completely
1994	"Grace, Too"	Day for Night
1994	"Greasy Jungle"	Day for Night
1995	"Nautical Disaster"	Day for Night
1996	"Thugs"	Day for Night
1996	"Ahead of the Century"	Trouble at the Henhouse
1996	"Gift Shop"	Trouble at the Henhouse
1998	"Poets"	Phantom Power
1998	"Something On"	Phantom Power
1999	"Bobcaygeon"	Phantom Power
2000	"My Music at Work"	Music @ Work
2002	"It's a Good Life If You Don't Weaken"	In Violet Light
2002	"Silver Jet"	In Violet Light
2002	"The Darkest One"	In Violet Light
2004	"Vaccination Scar"	In Between Evolution
2004	"It Can't Be Nashville Every Night"	In Between Evolution
2006	"In View"	World Container
2007	"Yer Not the Ocean"	World Container
2009	"The Last Recluse"	We Are the Same
2009	"Coffee Girl"	We Are the Same
2009	"Morning Moon"	We Are the Same
2012	"At Transformation"	Now for Plan A
2012	"The Lookahead"	Now for Plan A
2016	"In a World Possessed by the Human Mind"	Man Machine Poem
2021	"Ouch"	Saskadelphia (EP)
2021	"Not Necessary"	Saskadelphia (EP)
2024	"Get Back Again"	Up to Here (2024 reissue)
