= Hipeponymous =

Live album by The Tragically Hip

Box set by The Tragically Hip
- Released: November 1, 2005
- Genre: Rock
- Label: Universal

The Tragically Hip chronology
In Between Evolution (2004)	Hipeponymous (2005)	Yer Favourites (2005)

Professional ratings
Review scores
Source	Rating
Allmusic	4/5 stars
Exclaim!	(favourable)

Hipeponymous is a limited-edition boxed set by Canadian rock band The Tragically Hip. It was released on November 1, 2005. The album has been certified Platinum in Canada.

Hipeponymous contains a two-CD compilation of remastered songs voted for by fans titled Yer Favourites, a full-length concert DVD recorded on November 26, 2004, at the Air Canada Centre titled That Night in Toronto, and a DVD of bonus features that includes all of the band's music videos, a backstage documentary titled Macroscopic, and a short film titled The Right Whale, which features eleven visual vignettes set to new original scores written by the band, packaged in a forty-eight page hardbound book depicting various Hip memorabilia.

A very limited number of copies dispatched from Maple Music in Canada included a special postcard signed by all five members of the band.

== Contents ==
=== Yer Favourites ===
Disc 1

1. "No Threat" (new song)
2. "Grace, Too"
3. "My Music at Work"
4. "38 Years Old"
5. "Gift Shop"
6. "Ahead by a Century"
7. "Vaccination Scar"
8. "Three Pistols"
9. "So Hard Done By"
10. "Fiddler's Green"
11. "Looking for a Place to Happen"
12. "Cordelia"
13. "'It's a Good Life if You Don't Weaken'"
14. "Blow at High Dough"
15. "Wheat Kings"
16. "Fifty Mission Cap"
17. "New Orleans Is Sinking"
18. "Escape Is at Hand for the Travellin' Man"

Disc 2

1. "Fully Completely"
2. "Twist My Arm"
3. "Courage (for Hugh MacLennan)"
4. "Lake Fever"
5. "Poets"
6. "Fireworks"
7. "Boots or Hearts"
8. "Bobcaygeon"
9. "Nautical Disaster"
10. "Highway Girl"
11. "Gus: The Polar Bear from Central Park"
12. "Scared"
13. "Something On"
14. "At the Hundredth Meridian"
15. "Long Time Running"
16. "Darkest One"
17. "Locked in the Trunk of a Car"
18. "Little Bones"
19. "The New Maybe" (new song)

=== That Night in Toronto ===
Recorded on November 26, 2004, at the Air Canada Centre in Toronto.

1. "Vaccination Scar"
2. "Fully Completely"
3. "Grace, Too"
4. "Summer's Killing Us"
5. "Ahead by a Century"
6. "Silver Jet"
7. "As Makeshift as We Are"
8. "Courage (for Hugh MacLennan)"
9. "Bobcaygeon"
10. "Nautical Disaster"
11. "Gus: The Polar Bear from Central Park"
12. "Poets"
13. "At the Hundredth Meridian"
14. "It Can't Be Nashville Every Night"
15. "My Music at Work"
16. "New Orleans Is Sinking"

First encore:

"Heaven Is a Better Place Today"
"'It's a Good Life if You Don't Weaken'"
"Little Bones"

Second encore:

"Gift Shop"
"Springtime in Vienna"
"Three Pistols"

Third encore:

"Boots or Hearts"
"Blow at High Dough"

=== Bonus features ===
Video Kills

1. "Last American Exit"
2. "Small Town Bringdown"
3. "New Orleans Is Sinking"
4. "Blow at High Dough"
5. "Little Bones"
6. "Locked in the Trunk of a Car"
7. "Courage" (For Hugh MacLennan)
8. "At the Hundredth Meridian"
9. "Nautical Disaster"
10. "Thugs"
11. "Greasy Jungle"
12. "Grace, Too"
13. "Ahead by a Century"
14. "Gift Shop"
15. "Bobcaygeon"
16. "Something On"
17. "Poets"
18. "My Music at Work"
19. "'It's a Good Life if You Don't Weaken'"
20. "Silver Jet"
21. "The Darkest One"
22. "Vaccination Scar"
23. "It Can't Be Nashville Every Night"

Macroscopic A short film by Christopher Mills

The Right Whale

1. "Cooking in Wartime"
2. "Piano Spider"
3. "speakersong"
4. "Air Plane"
5. "Sub Way"
6. "Edible Paper"
7. "What's Ummm Mean?"
8. "Leaving the Island"
9. "Land Scape Clouds"
10. "Mind Fame"
11. "The Right Whale"

Yer Favourites

Greatest hits album by the Tragically Hip
- Released: November 8, 2005
- Genre: Rock
- Length: 154:52
- Label: Universal

The Tragically Hip chronology
Hipeponymous (2005)	Yer Favourites (2005)	World Container (2006)

Singles from Yer Favourites
- 1. "No Threat" Released: 2005

Professional ratings
Review scores
Source	Rating
AllMusic	4/5 stars

== Yer Favourites ==
Yer Favourites is a two-disc compilation album by the Tragically Hip. The tracks for Yer Favourites were selected by the band's fans on its website and were remastered. The compilation includes a total of seven songs from Fully Completely (the most songs of any album on the compilation), six songs from Road Apples, five songs from Phantom Power, four songs from Up to Here, four songs from Day for Night, two songs from Trouble at the Henhouse, two songs from Music @ Work, two songs from In Violet Light, two songs from In Between Evolution and one song from the band's self-titled EP. It also included two new songs, "No Threat" and "The New Maybe". It was released both as a stand-alone two-disc set and as part of the Hipeponymous box set. The compilation debuted at number 8 on the Canadian Albums Chart in 2005. In 2016, the compilation re-entered the Canadian Albums Chart, contemporaneous with the release of Man Machine Poem and the announcement of lead singer Gord Downie's cancer diagnosis.

Following the Tragically Hip's final concert of their Man Machine Poem Tour, which was broadcast live on CBC and watched by 11.7 million people, the compilation reached number 1 on the Canadian Albums Chart. It returned to the Canadian charts again in October 2017 following Downie's death, immediately rising from #182 to #2.

== Track listing ==
=== Disc one ===
1. "No Threat" (new song)
2. "Grace, Too" (Day for Night)
3. "My Music at Work" (Music @ Work)
4. "38 Years Old" (Up to Here)
5. "Gift Shop" (Trouble at the Henhouse)
6. "Ahead by a Century" (Trouble at the Henhouse)
7. "Vaccination Scar" (In Between Evolution)
8. "Three Pistols" (Road Apples)
9. "So Hard Done By" (Day for Night)
10. "Fiddler's Green" (Road Apples)
11. "Looking for a Place to Happen (Remix)" (Fully Completely)
12. "Cordelia" (Road Apples)
13. "It's a Good Life If You Don't Weaken" (In Violet Light)
14. "Blow at High Dough" (Up to Here)
15. "Wheat Kings" (Fully Completely)
16. "Fifty Mission Cap" (Fully Completely)
17. "New Orleans Is Sinking" (Up to Here)
18. "Escape Is at Hand for the Travellin' Man" (Phantom Power)

=== Disc two ===
1. "Fully Completely (Remix)" (Fully Completely)
2. "Twist My Arm" (Road Apples)
3. "Courage (for Hugh MacLennan) (Remix)" (Fully Completely)
4. "Lake Fever" (Music @ Work)
5. "Poets" (Phantom Power)
6. "Fireworks" (Phantom Power)
7. "Boots or Hearts" (Up to Here)
8. "Bobcaygeon" (Phantom Power)
9. "Nautical Disaster" (Day for Night)
10. "Highway Girl" (The Tragically Hip)
11. "Gus: The Polar Bear from Central Park" (In Between Evolution)
12. "Scared" (Day for Night)
13. "Something On" (Phantom Power)
14. "At the Hundredth Meridian (Remix)" (Fully Completely)
15. "Long Time Running" (Road Apples)
16. "The Darkest One" (In Violet Light)
17. "Locked in the Trunk of a Car" (Fully Completely)
18. "Little Bones" (Road Apples)
19. "The New Maybe" (new song)

== Charts ==
=== Weekly charts ===
Chart (2016)	Peak position
Canadian Albums (Billboard)	1

=== Year-end charts ===
Chart (2016)	Position
Canadian Albums (Billboard)	13
Chart (2017)	Position
Canadian Albums (Billboard)	32
Chart (2018)	Position
Canadian Albums (Billboard)	30
Chart (2019)	Position
Canadian Albums (Billboard)	44
Chart (2020)	Position
Canadian Albums (Billboard)	39
Chart (2021)	Position
Canadian Albums (Billboard)	26

== Certifications ==
Region	Certification	Certified units/sales
Canada (Music Canada)	Diamond	1,000,000^{‡}
^{‡} Sales+streaming figures based on certification alone.

== See also ==
- List of 2005 albums
- List of greatest hits albums
