= Yer Favourites =

Greatest hits album by the Tragically Hip
- Released: November 8, 2005
- Genre: Rock
- Length: 154:52
- Label: Universal

The Tragically Hip chronology
Hipeponymous (2005)	Yer Favourites (2005)	World Container (2006)

Singles from Yer Favourites
- 1. "No Threat" Released: 2005

Professional ratings
Review scores
Source	Rating
AllMusic	4/5 stars

Yer Favourites is a two-disc compilation album by the Tragically Hip. The tracks for Yer Favourites were selected by the band's fans on its website and were remastered. The compilation includes a total of seven songs from Fully Completely (the most songs of any album on the compilation), six songs from Road Apples, five songs from Phantom Power, four songs from Up to Here, four songs from Day for Night, two songs from Trouble at the Henhouse, two songs from Music @ Work, two songs from In Violet Light, two songs from In Between Evolution and one song from the band's self-titled EP. It also included two new songs, "No Threat" and "The New Maybe". It was released both as a stand-alone two-disc set and as part of the Hipeponymous box set. The compilation debuted at number 8 on the Canadian Albums Chart in 2005. In 2016, the compilation re-entered the Canadian Albums Chart, contemporaneous with the release of Man Machine Poem and the announcement of lead singer Gord Downie's cancer diagnosis.

Following the Tragically Hip's final concert of their Man Machine Poem Tour, which was broadcast live on CBC and watched by 11.7 million people, the compilation reached number 1 on the Canadian Albums Chart. It returned to the Canadian charts again in October 2017 following Downie's death, immediately rising from #182 to #2.

== Track listing ==
=== Disc one ===
1. "No Threat" (new song)
2. "Grace, Too" (Day for Night)
3. "My Music at Work" (Music @ Work)
4. "38 Years Old" (Up to Here)
5. "Gift Shop" (Trouble at the Henhouse)
6. "Ahead by a Century" (Trouble at the Henhouse)
7. "Vaccination Scar" (In Between Evolution)
8. "Three Pistols" (Road Apples)
9. "So Hard Done By" (Day for Night)
10. "Fiddler's Green" (Road Apples)
11. "Looking for a Place to Happen (Remix)" (Fully Completely)
12. "Cordelia" (Road Apples)
13. "It's a Good Life If You Don't Weaken" (In Violet Light)
14. "Blow at High Dough" (Up to Here)
15. "Wheat Kings" (Fully Completely)
16. "Fifty Mission Cap" (Fully Completely)
17. "New Orleans Is Sinking" (Up to Here)
18. "Escape Is at Hand for the Travellin' Man" (Phantom Power)

=== Disc two ===
1. "Fully Completely (Remix)" (Fully Completely)
2. "Twist My Arm" (Road Apples)
3. "Courage (for Hugh MacLennan) (Remix)" (Fully Completely)
4. "Lake Fever" (Music @ Work)
5. "Poets" (Phantom Power)
6. "Fireworks" (Phantom Power)
7. "Boots or Hearts" (Up to Here)
8. "Bobcaygeon" (Phantom Power)
9. "Nautical Disaster" (Day for Night)
10. "Highway Girl" (The Tragically Hip)
11. "Gus: The Polar Bear from Central Park" (In Between Evolution)
12. "Scared" (Day for Night)
13. "Something On" (Phantom Power)
14. "At the Hundredth Meridian (Remix)" (Fully Completely)
15. "Long Time Running" (Road Apples)
16. "The Darkest One" (In Violet Light)
17. "Locked in the Trunk of a Car" (Fully Completely)
18. "Little Bones" (Road Apples)
19. "The New Maybe" (new song)

== Charts ==
=== Weekly charts ===
Chart (2016)	Peak position
Canadian Albums (Billboard)	1

=== Year-end charts ===
Chart (2016)	Position
Canadian Albums (Billboard)	13
Chart (2017)	Position
Canadian Albums (Billboard)	32
Chart (2018)	Position
Canadian Albums (Billboard)	30
Chart (2019)	Position
Canadian Albums (Billboard)	44
Chart (2020)	Position
Canadian Albums (Billboard)	39
Chart (2021)	Position
Canadian Albums (Billboard)	26

== Certifications ==
Region	Certification	Certified units/sales
Canada (Music Canada)	Diamond	1,000,000^{‡}
^{‡} Sales+streaming figures based on certification alone.

== See also ==
- List of 2005 albums
- List of greatest hits albums
