= Bathouse =

Bathouse may refer to:

- A misspelling of bathhouse, a location for public bathing
- Bat house or bat box, a home for bats
- Bathouse Recording Studio, in Ontario, Canada
