= The Opera House (Toronto) =

Music venue in Canada

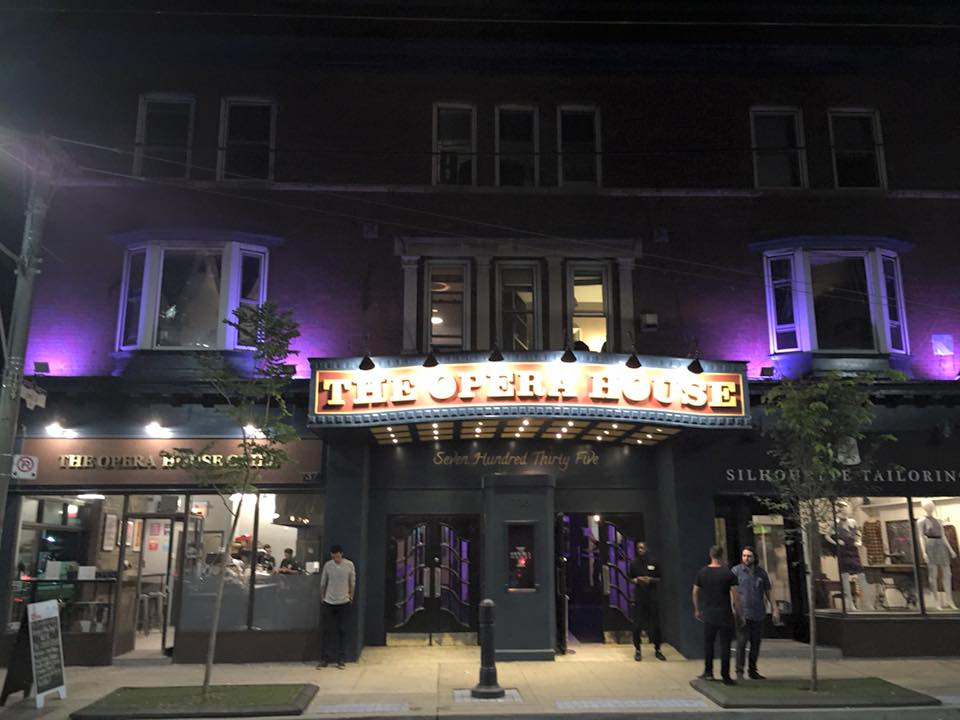
- The Opera House in 2015
- Interactive map of The Opera House
- Former names: La Plaza Theatre; Acropolis; Dundas; Cinema Ellas
- Address: 735 Queen Street E Toronto ON M4M 1H1
- Location: Toronto, Ontario, Canada
- Coordinates: 43.658949°N 79.348752°W
- Capacity: 950 (680 Main Floor and 270 Balcony)
- Type: Theater/Music Venue

Construction
- Built: 1903
- Opened: 1905

Website
- theoperahousetoronto.com

The Opera House is a music venue in Toronto, Ontario, Canada. It is one of the city's most historic performing venues, opening in 1905. It has also been a cinema and a live theatre venue. It is located at 735 Queen Street East, east of downtown in the Riverdale neighbourhood.

== History ==
The building opened in 1905 as the La Plaza Theatre, an Edwardian vaudeville stage. Seating almost 700, it was the main entertainment venue in the primarily working-class neighbourhood. As films eclipsed vaudeville, the theatre was turned into a cinema, continuing to use the name La Plaza Theatre until the 1960s, and later under a series of other names.

As multiplexes made large single screen venues no longer viable as cinemas, it became a performing arts venue. In the late 1980s, it was home to the successful gospel musical Mama, I Want to Sing!. In early 1989, it was renamed "The Opera House" and became a music venue.

In 2023, the Opera House was acquired by Live Nation Canada and added to their venue portfolio.

== Other uses ==
- The venue was used for the filming of the music video for the Headstones song, "Smile and Wave".
- The venue was used for the filming of the 1998 music video for the Barenaked Ladies song, "Brian Wilson".
- The venue was used for the filming of a scene in the 2000 film Loser in which the band Everclear performed a concert.
- The venue was used for the filming of the music video for The Tragically Hip song, "My Music at Work".
