= Heksenketel =

Video by The Tragically Hip
- Released: 1993

The Tragically Hip chronology
Heksenketel (1993)	That Night in Toronto (2005)

Heksenketel is a documentary film released on VHS by Canadian rock band The Tragically Hip. It features concert footage and other clips of the band and crew as they travel across Canada from coast to coast during their 1993 tour, Another Roadside Attraction.

== Trivia ==
Heksenketel was originally the name of the Another Roadside Attraction tour before it was changed. In the Dutch language 'Heksenketel' literally means "witch's cauldron", though it is mostly used in the vernacular sense, meaning bedlam or pandemonium.
