= World Container =

Studio album by The Tragically Hip
- Released: October 17, 2006
- Recorded: September 2005, February–April 2006
- Studios: The Warehouse, Vancouver; Phase One, Toronto; Armoury, Vancouver
- Genres: Rock, alternative rock
- Length: 42:27
- Label: Universal
- Producer: Bob Rock

The Tragically Hip chronology
Yer Favourites (2005)	World Container (2006)	We Are the Same (2009)

Singles from World Container
- 1. "In View" Released: 24 August 2006; 2. "The Lonely End of the Rink" Released: 2006; 3. "Yer Not the Ocean" Released: 2006; 4. "Family Band" Released: 2007

Professional ratings
Review scores
Source	Rating
AllMusic	4/5 stars
Exclaim!	(favourable)
Jam!	3.5/5 stars

World Container is the tenth studio album by Canadian rock band The Tragically Hip. It was released in Canada on October 17, 2006, in two formats: as a limited edition digipak and regular jewel case. The United States release was March 6, 2007, in advance of a planned tour. This album was recorded at various locations including Maui, Vancouver and Toronto. In concert Gord Downie joked that the title of the album is actually a typo, and should read "World Contain Her".

The first single, "In View", and the video for the song were released on the band's website in advance of the album release. "In View" reached number 1 on Billboard's Canada Rock chart.

The track "The Lonely End of the Rink" was premiered on Hockey Night in Canada on October 7.

"The Drop-Off" was featured in season 7 episode 6 of Trailer Park Boys.

The album's fourth track, "Fly", had been in the works since before the band recorded their November 26, 2004, show at the Air Canada Centre, which became the concert DVD That Night in Toronto. As can be witnessed on the DVD, Gord Downie recites the opening lyric of "Fly", as well as a portion of the chorus, as a part of his rant during the extended up-tempo break of "At the Hundredth Meridian".

The length of the CD is erroneously noted as "42:45" (min:sec) on the front and back cover. It is actually 42:27 (min:sec), or 42.45 minutes in length (42 min + (27/60) sec).

World Container was available to stream from the band's website and various Southern Ontario radio stations on October 10, 2006, one week ahead of the album release.

== Commercial performance ==
World Container debuted at #2 on the Canadian Albums Chart, selling 27,000 copies in its first week. The album was certified Platinum in Canada in the same month of its release.

== Track listing ==
All tracks are written by The Tragically Hip.

No.	Title	Length
1.	"Yer Not the Ocean"	3:35
2.	"The Lonely End of the Rink"	3:51
3.	"In View"	3:58
4.	"Fly"	3:42
5.	"Luv (sic)"	3:43
6.	"The Kids Don't Get It"	4:35
7.	"Pretend"	3:47
8.	"Last Night I Dreamed You Didn't Love Me"	4:21
9.	"The Drop-Off"	3:39
10.	"Family Band"	3:40
11.	"World Container"	3:36

== Personnel ==
Personnel taken from World Container liner notes.

The Tragically Hip

- Rob Baker
- Gord Downie
- Johnny Fay
- Paul Langlois
- Gord Sinclair

Additional performers

- Jamie Edwards – keyboards (1, 3, 4, 7, 10)
- Sally Rock, Lucy Rock, Randy Rock, Uma O'Neil, Melinda Neuwirth, Louis Edgar – background vocals (10)

Technical personnel

- Bob Rock – production, recording
- Jamey Koch – recording
- Eric Helmkamp – recording
- Bryan Gallant – recording assistance
- Rob Stefanson – recording assistance
- Fraser Grieg – recording assistance
- Mark Renner – recording assistance
- George Marino – mastering
