= Canadian Newsmaker of the Year =

Annual award by The Canadian Press

The Canadian Newsmaker of the Year is a title awarded by The Canadian Press (CP) annually since 1946, based on a survey of editors and broadcasters across the country on which Canadian has had the most influence on the news in a given year.

== Criteria ==
Canadian historian Chad Gaffield stated that the practice of recognizing a newsmaker of the year was a return to the study of how history can be influenced by one person, rather than studying obscure people.

The honour is often granted to politicians. Pierre Trudeau holds the record for most wins, receiving the distinction for the 10th time in 2000, breaking a tie with Lester B. Pearson's nine wins. Though it is generally a positive acknowledgement, it is not guaranteed to be such. In 1999 a newsmaker of the century was chosen in place of a newsmaker of the year, with candidates having to meet the standard of "lasting significance". Voters gave a mix of compliments and criticisms to the winner, Pierre Trudeau, who responded by noting that he was "at once surprised and quite pleased with the information."

== List of Newsmakers of the Year ==
Year	Awardee	Notes
1946	Igor Gouzenko	Embassy clerk who exposed Soviet espionage.
1947	Barbara Ann Scott	First North American to win World Figure Skating Championship
1948	William Lyon Mackenzie King	Retired that year as the longest serving prime minister in Commonwealth of Nations history.
1949	Louis St. Laurent	Politician who was appointed prime minister after his party won that year's federal election.
1950	Lester Pearson	Diplomat.
1951	Lester Pearson	
1952	Lester Pearson	
1953	Lester Pearson	
1954	Marilyn Bell	Marathon swimmer.
1955	Lester Pearson	
1956	Lester Pearson	
1957	John Diefenbaker	Appointed as prime minister after his party won an unexpected minority in that year's federal election.
1958	John Diefenbaker	Continued as prime minister after his party won the largest majority in Canadian history in that year's federal election.
1959	John Diefenbaker and Joey Smallwood	Prime minister and premier of Newfoundland, respectively.
1960	John Diefenbaker	
1961	James Coyne	Resigned that year as Governor of the Bank of Canada.
1962	Réal Caouette	Social Credit politician who helped vote out the Diefenbaker government.
1963	Lester Pearson	Was appointed as prime minister after his party won that year's federal election.
1964	Lester Pearson	Oversaw as prime minister the debate on Canada's flag.
1965	Lucien Rivard	Convicted drug smuggler who escaped from prison and remained at large for 136 days.
1966	John Diefenbaker	Refused to surrender Progressive Conservative Party leadership.
1967	Lester Pearson	Oversaw as prime minister the organisation of the festivities for the Canadian Centennial.
1968	Pierre Trudeau	Appointed as prime minister and continued in office after his party won that year's federal election.
1969	Pierre Trudeau	
1970	Pierre Trudeau	
1971	Pierre Trudeau	
1972	Pierre Trudeau	
1973	Pierre Trudeau	
1974	Pierre Trudeau	
1975	Pierre Trudeau	
1976	René Lévesque	Appointed as the first sovereigntist premier of Quebec after his party won that year's provincial election.
1977	René Lévesque	Signed The Charter of the French Language law in Quebec, making French the sole language of the province that year.
1978	Pierre Trudeau	
1979	Joe Clark	Appointed as prime minister after his party won that year's federal election.
1980	Terry Fox	With an artificial leg, averaged 42 km per day during his Marathon of Hope.
1981	Terry Fox	Died at age 22.
1982	Wayne Gretzky	Hockey player nicknamed The Great One, scored a record 92 goals in a single season.
1983	Brian Mulroney	Won the leadership election to head the Progressive Conservative Party.
1984	Brian Mulroney	Appointed as prime minister after his party won a record 211 of 282 seats in that year's federal election.
1985	Steve Fonyo	Cancer victim who lost a leg and ran a marathon similar to Terry Fox's.
1986	Rick Hansen	World-class cross-country wheelchair athlete.
1987	Rick Hansen	
1988	Ben Johnson	Set a world record in the 100 metre race at the 1988 Summer Olympics, but was subsequently disqualified for steroid use.
1989	Michael Wilson	Minister of Finance responsible for the Canada-US Free Trade Agreement.
1990	Elijah Harper	Member of the Legislative Assembly of Manitoba who filibustered to stop the Meech Lake Accord.
1991	Brian Mulroney	Advised the implementation of the Goods and Services Tax and dealt with the aftermath of the failure of the Meech Lake Accord.
1992	The referendum on the Charlottetown Accord	The first selection of a symbol rather than a specific person.
1993	Kim Campbell	Briefly served as prime minister, becoming the first woman to do so in Canada.
1994	Jacques Parizeau	Appointed as premier of Quebec after his party won that year's provincial election
1995	Lucien Bouchard	Leader of Her Majesty's Loyal Opposition in the federal parliament, and a key player in the referendum on Quebec sovereignty.
1996	Donovan Bailey	Sprinter who ran 100 metre dash in record 9.84 seconds, winning gold at that year's Olympics.
1997	Sheldon Kennedy	Hockey player and child abuse victim who went public in his campaign against abuse.
1998	Jean Chrétien	Prime minister who was chosen over the National Post's publisher, Conrad Black, by one vote, for favourable public opinion. Chrétien merely replied that a prime minister is often a newsmaker.
1999	Pierre Trudeau	Voted Canadian newsmaker of the 20th century, with no newsmaker named for 1999 itself. The vote also produced a top 10 list of newsmakers, in which Terry Fox came second, followed by René Lévesque, Frederick Banting, Tommy Douglas, William Lyon Mackenzie King, Lester Pearson, Wilfrid Laurier, Billy Bishop, and Brian Mulroney.
2000	Pierre Trudeau	Events of the six days that marked his passing and state funeral.
2001	Stockwell Day	Canadian Alliance leader challenged by many in his own party. Day received 74 votes, followed by Chrétien with 12 votes. It was argued that while the Newsmaker of the Year title is often a positive title, Day was selected for perceived ineptness and probably did not want the designation.
2002	Jean Chrétien	Editor Don McCurdy explained: "While not everything he has done has met with a positive reaction, like the gun registry fiasco, much of it has been notable."
2003	Paul Martin	Appointed as prime minister after winning his party's leadership election that year.
2004	Paul Martin	Became the first minority prime minister in 25 years, after his party won that year's federal election, and was linked to the sponsorship scandal.
2005	John Gomery	Judge who held the inquiry into the Liberal Party sponsorship scandal.
2006	The Canadian soldier	Members of the Canadian Forces engaged in the war in Afghanistan; editor Gary MacDougall said that "The issue of Canada's involvement in Afghanistan has been on the lips, and in the hearts, of Canadians all year."
2007	Royal Canadian Mounted Police	National police force besieged by crises and scandals throughout the year. According to an editor: "The RCMP dominated Canadian news this year."
2008	Stephen Harper	Prime minister who tabled the apology for the residential schools and instigated that year's parliamentary dispute.
2009	Stephen Harper	
2010	Russell Williams	Former Royal Canadian Air Force Colonel, found guilty of murdering and raping two women.
2011	Jack Layton	Led the New Democratic Party to official opposition, Leader of Her Majesty's Loyal Opposition in the federal parliament, whose state funeral occurred in 2011.
2012	Luka Magnotta	Arrested and charged with the murder and dismemberment of a student.
2013	Rob Ford	Mayor of Toronto whose controversies attracted international attention.
2014	Patrice Vincent and Nathan Cirillo	Two soldiers killed two days apart in separate Islamic attacks on Canadian soil.
2015	Justin Trudeau	The 23rd Prime Minister of Canada, who led his third-place Liberal Party to electoral victory in the year's federal election.
2016	Gord Downie	Lead singer for the rock band The Tragically Hip, with whom he performed in a series of high-profile farewell concerts following his diagnosis with terminal brain cancer.
2017	Gord Downie	Died at the age of 53 from brain cancer, ten days before the release of his sixth solo album Introduce Yerself. Honoured, in part, for his work with the Gord Downie & Chanie Wenjack Foundation, which aids in the effort for reconciliation with the Indigenous peoples of Canada, and in particular survivors of the Canadian Indian residential school system.
2018	Humboldt Broncos	Junior ice hockey team from Saskatchewan involved in a collision with a semi-trailer on April 6, resulting in 16 deaths and 13 injuries.
2019	Jody Wilson-Raybould	Member of Parliament for Vancouver Granville and former cabinet minister at the centre of the SNC-Lavalin affair.
2020	Front-line workers	Responders to the COVID-19 pandemic in Canada.
2021	"Children who never returned from residential schools"	Many Canadian Indian residential school gravesites were discovered in 2021.
2022	Canada convoy protesters	Protesters who blockaded the U.S. border and occupied the streets of Ottawa.
2023	Pierre Poilievre	Leader of the federal Conservative Party and leader of the Official Opposition since 2022. In the summer of 2023, the Conservatives under Poilievre experienced a surge in support according to opinion polls, gaining a significant lead over the incumbent Liberals.
2024	Pierre Poilievre	
2025	Mark Carney	The 24th Prime Minister of Canada and Leader of the Liberal Party who led his party to a fourth consecutive term in the 2025 federal election, overturning a large deficit in opinion polling.

== See also ==
- Canada: A People's History
- Heritage Minutes
- List of inductees of Canada's Walk of Fame
- Persons of National Historic Significance
- The Greatest Canadian
