= That Night in Toronto =

Video by The Tragically Hip
- Released: 2005
- Recorded: 26 November 2004
- Venues: Air Canada Centre, Toronto
- Genre: Rock
- Length: 116:00
- Label: Universal
- Directors: Francois Lamoureux, Pierre Lamoureux
- Producer: Pierre Lamoureux

The Tragically Hip chronology
Heksenketel (1993)	That Night in Toronto (2005)

That Night in Toronto is a live concert DVD featuring Canadian rock band The Tragically Hip, filmed and directed by filmmaking brothers Pierre and Francois Lamoureux.

It was recorded November 26, 2004 at the Air Canada Centre in Toronto, Ontario, Canada during The Hip's In Between Evolution tour and captures that night's performance in full with no edits.

Originally released November 1, 2005, as a part of the Hipeponymous box set, it was released separately on November 8, 2005. The audio is exclusively available from the iTunes Music Store.

The title of the DVD is taken from a line of the popular Hip song "Bobcaygeon".

== Contents ==
During instrumental parts in the performance of "Fully Completely" Gord sings parts of "Love is a First", a song which would come out on the album "We Are the Same" on April 7, 2009; Nearly 5 years after this DVD was recorded.

Setlist:

1. "Vaccination Scar"
2. "Fully Completely"
3. "Grace, Too"
4. "Summer's Killing Us"
5. "Ahead by a Century"
6. "Silver Jet"
7. "As Makeshift as We Are"
8. "Courage (for Hugh MacLennan)"
9. "Bobcaygeon"
10. "Nautical Disaster"
11. "Gus: The Polar Bear from Central Park"
12. "Poets"
13. "At the Hundredth Meridian"
14. "It Can't Be Nashville Every Night"
15. "My Music at Work"
16. "New Orleans Is Sinking"
17. "Heaven is a Better Place Today"
18. "It's A Good Life If You Don't Weaken"
19. "Little Bones"
20. "Gift Shop"
21. "Springtime in Vienna"
22. "Three Pistols"
23. "Boots or Hearts"
24. "Blow at High Dough"
