= Slush Puppie Place =

Indoor arena in downtown Kingston, Ontario

- "Kingston Regional Sports and Entertainment Centre"
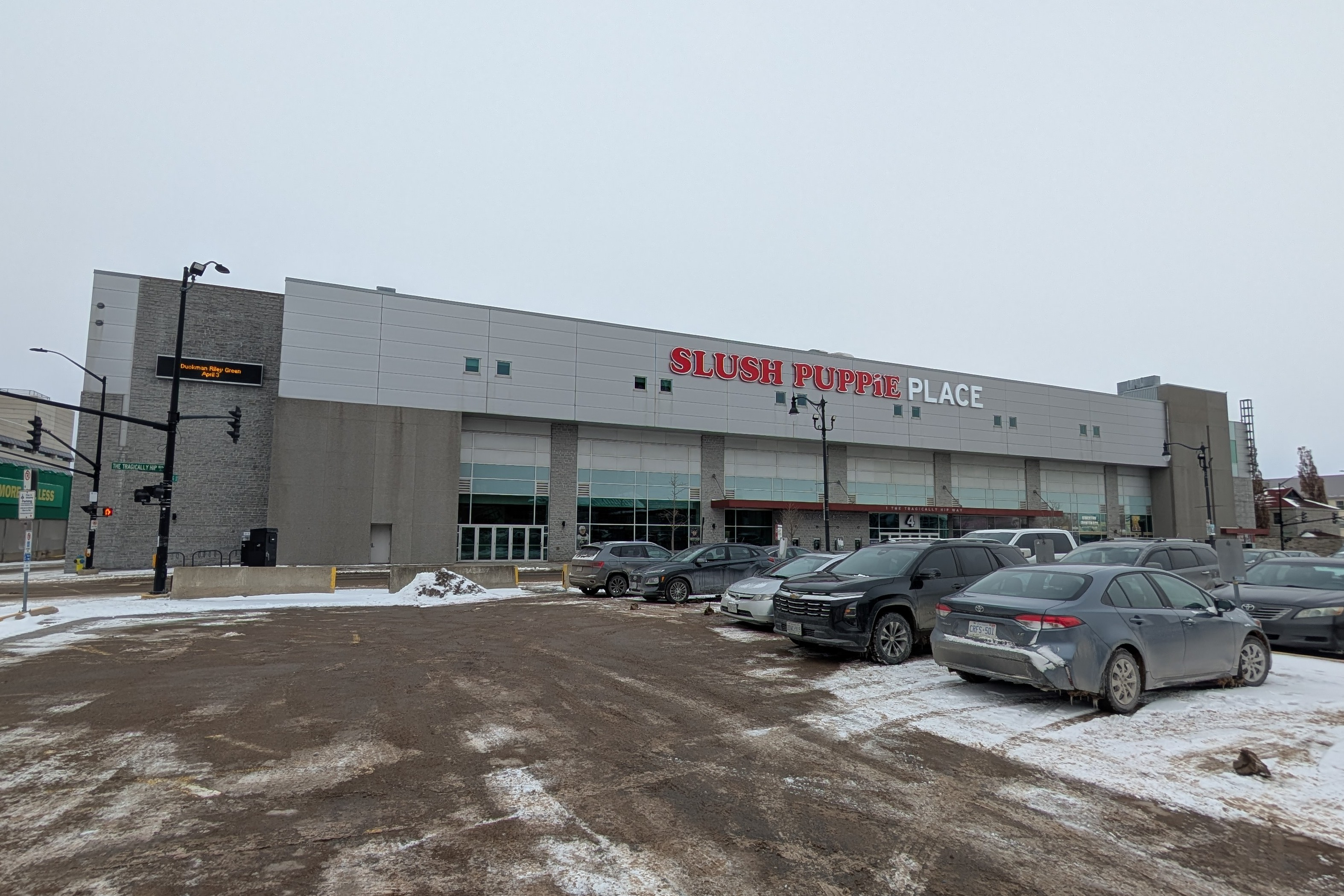

- Location within Ontario Location within Canada
- Former names: K-Rock Centre (2008-2013); Rogers K-Rock Centre (2013-2018); Leon's Centre (2018-2024)
- Location: 1 The Tragically Hip Way; Kingston, Ontario, Canada
- Coordinates: 44.2334°N 76.4797°W
- Owner: City of Kingston
- Operator: ASM Global
- Capacity: Ice hockey: 5,000; Concerts: 6,700
- Surface: Multi-surface
- Field size: 200' X 85'

Construction
- Groundbreaking: July 28, 2006
- Opened: February 22, 2008
- Cost: C$46.5 million ($66.9 million in 2025 dollars)
- Architect: Brisbin Brook Beynon Architects (BBB Architects)
- Project managers: PMX, Inc.
- Structural engineer: Halcrow Yolles
- Services engineer: The Mitchell Partnership Inc.
- General contractor: EllisDon

Tenant
- Kingston Frontenacs (OHL) (2008–present)

Slush Puppie Place (formerly Leon's Centre) is a 5,000-seat indoor arena in downtown Kingston, Ontario. Opened in 2008 as the K-Rock Centre, it is the home of the Kingston Frontenacs of the Ontario Hockey League (OHL).

== History ==
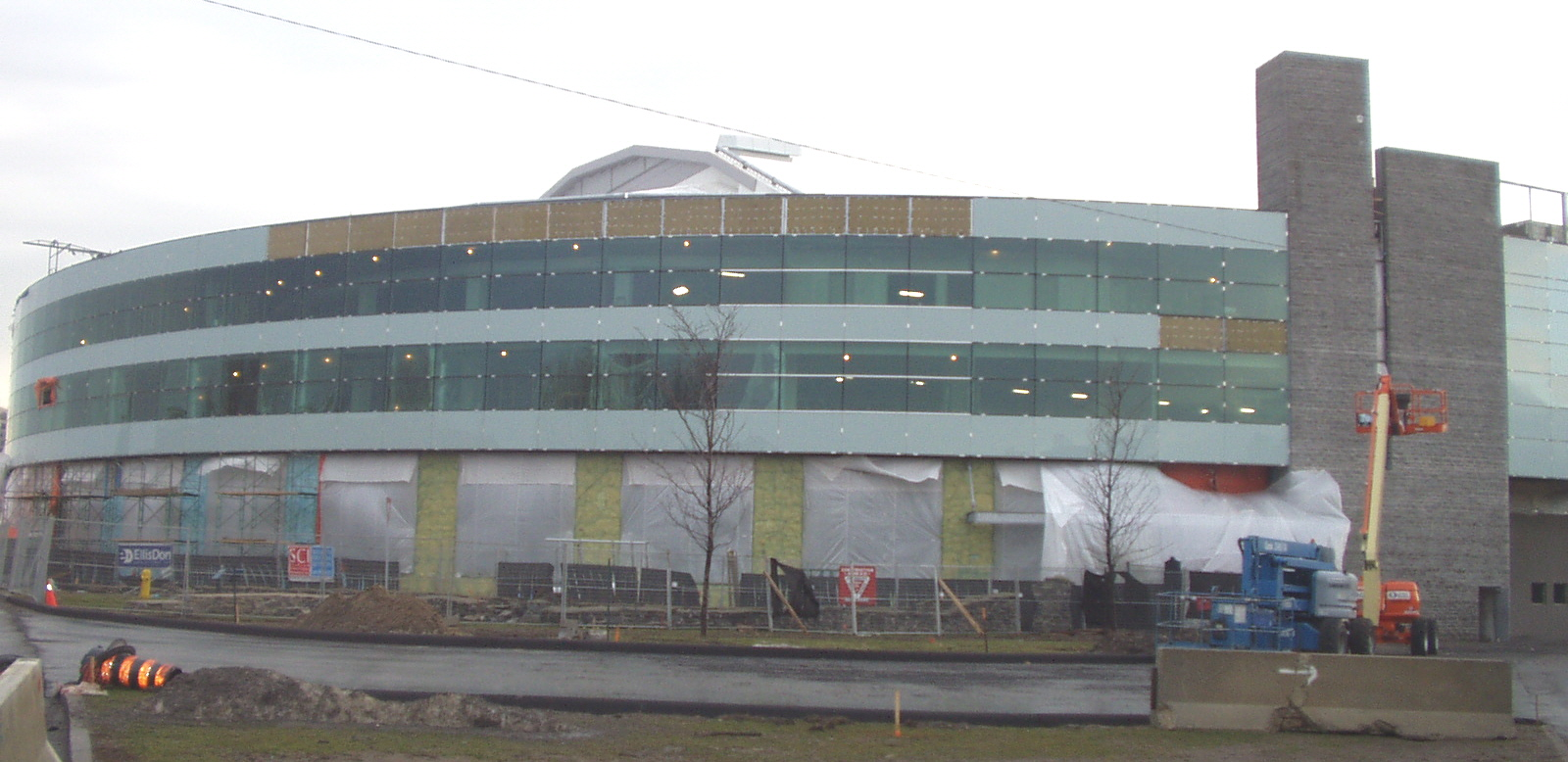
Construction of Slush Puppie Place, then known as Kingston Sports and Entertainment Centre; January 2008

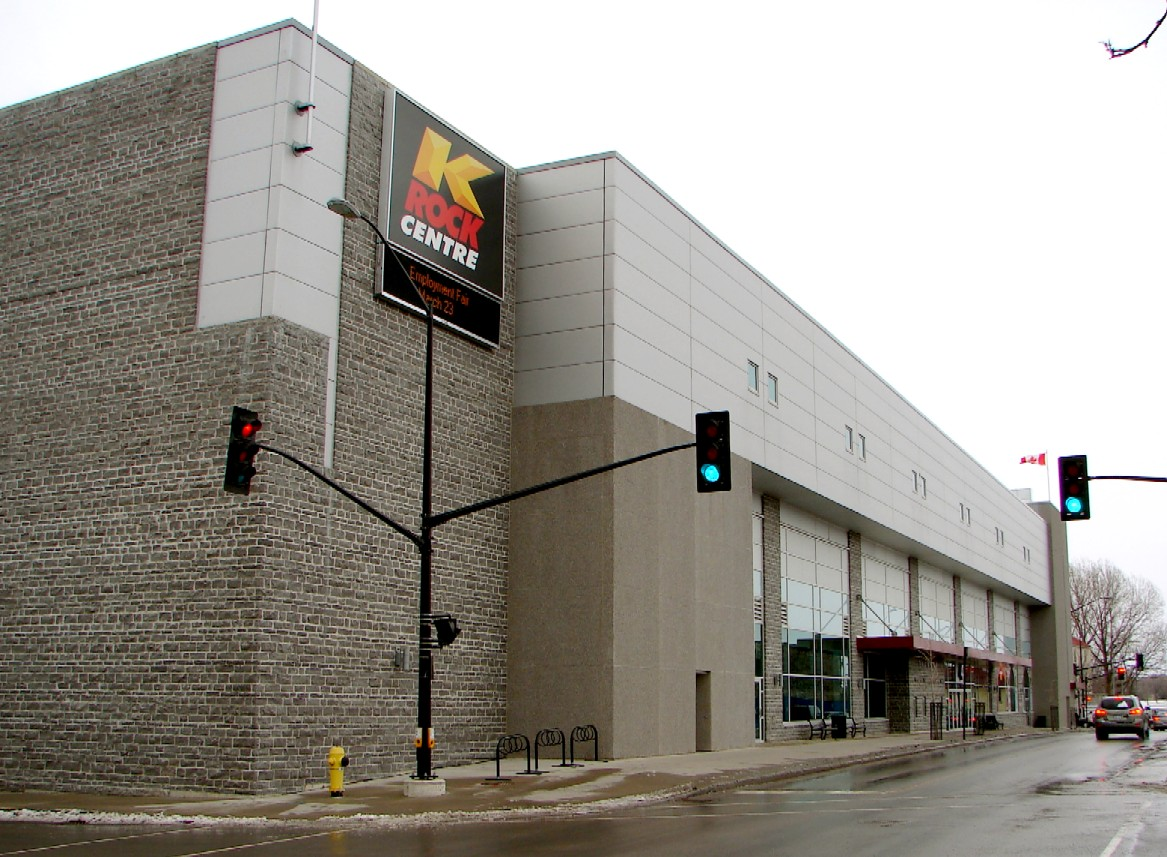
Exterior of Slush Puppie Place in February 2010, then K-Rock Centre

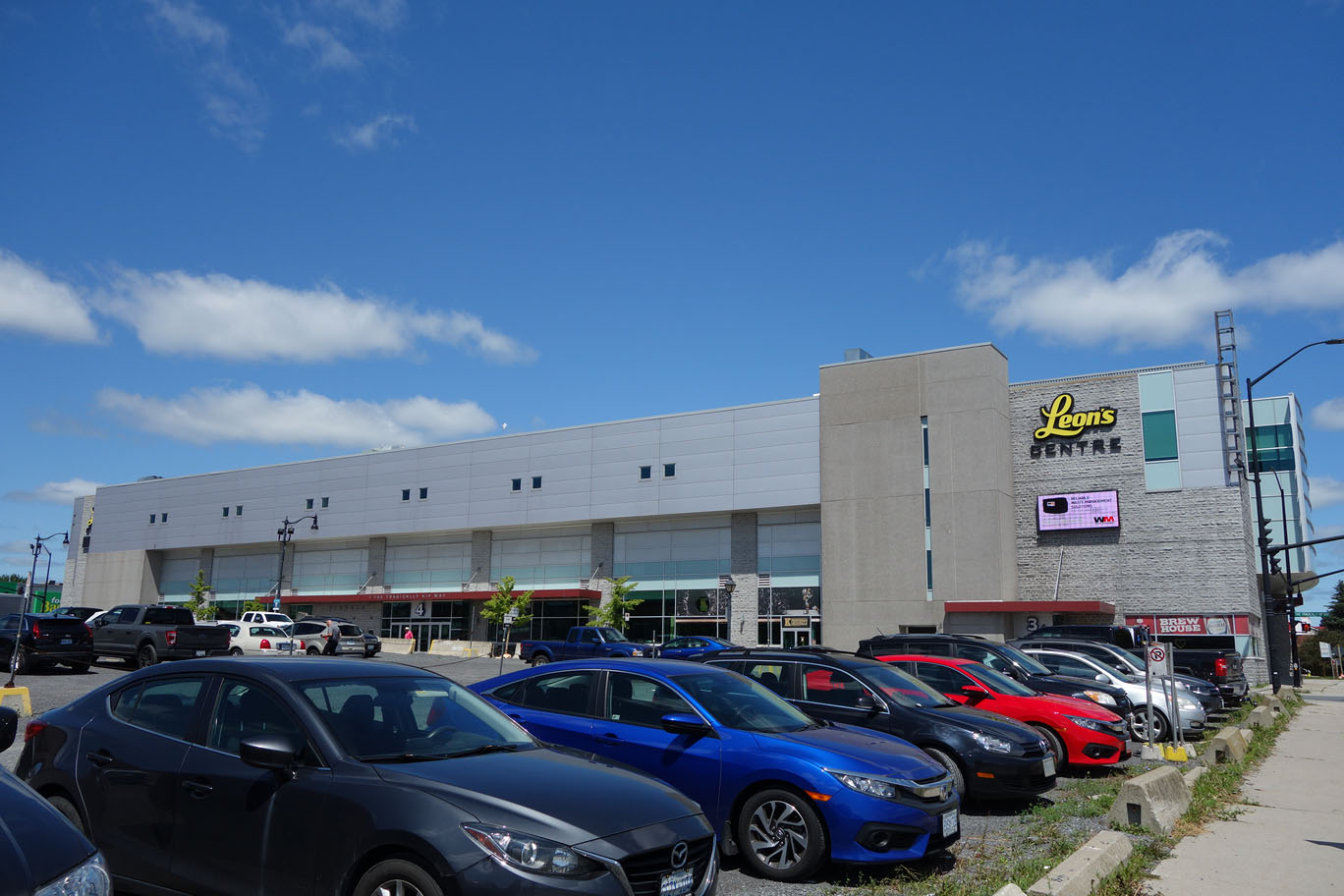
Exterior of Slush Puppie Place in July 2021, then Leon's Centre

The arena was designed by Brisbin Brook Beynon Architects, and was constructed by EllisDon Construction. It was built on city-owned land known as the "North Block", which at the time was being used as a parking lot. An archaeological dig of the area was necessary since the southeast portion of the site was the former location of part of the historic Fort Frontenac. The remaining ruins of the fort's northwest bastion is located directly across the street from the main entrance.

The groundbreaking ceremony took place July 28, 2006, with construction beginning on November 3, 2006. On February 6, 2008, local radio station CIKR-FM purchased the naming rights to the arena for 10 years in a $3.3 million agreement, naming it the K-Rock Centre.

In February 2012, Kingston City Council voted to rename the street on which the arena is located, formerly a part of Barrack Street, to The Tragically Hip Way in honour of Kingston band The Tragically Hip.

In August 2013, the arena's name was amended to Rogers K-Rock Centre to reflect Rogers Communications' current ownership of CIKR. In 2018, the naming rights were sold to Chris McKercher—owner of the local Leon's franchise—renaming the arena to Leon's Centre. The five-year agreement was valued at $257,000 per-year. In January 2024, J&J Snack Foods acquired the naming rights via its Slush Puppie subsidiary, renaming the arena to Slush Puppie Place. The 15-year agreement is valued at around $2.2 million, and includes branding and concessions placements.

== Notable events ==
=== Ice hockey ===
The Kingston Frontenacs played their first game at the arena on February 22, 2008, losing 3–2 to their rivals, the Belleville Bulls. Kingston native Don Cherry performed the ceremonial puck drop prior to the game.

Two days later, on February 24, 2008, the Frontenacs earned their first win at the arena, defeating the Peterborough Petes 7–4.

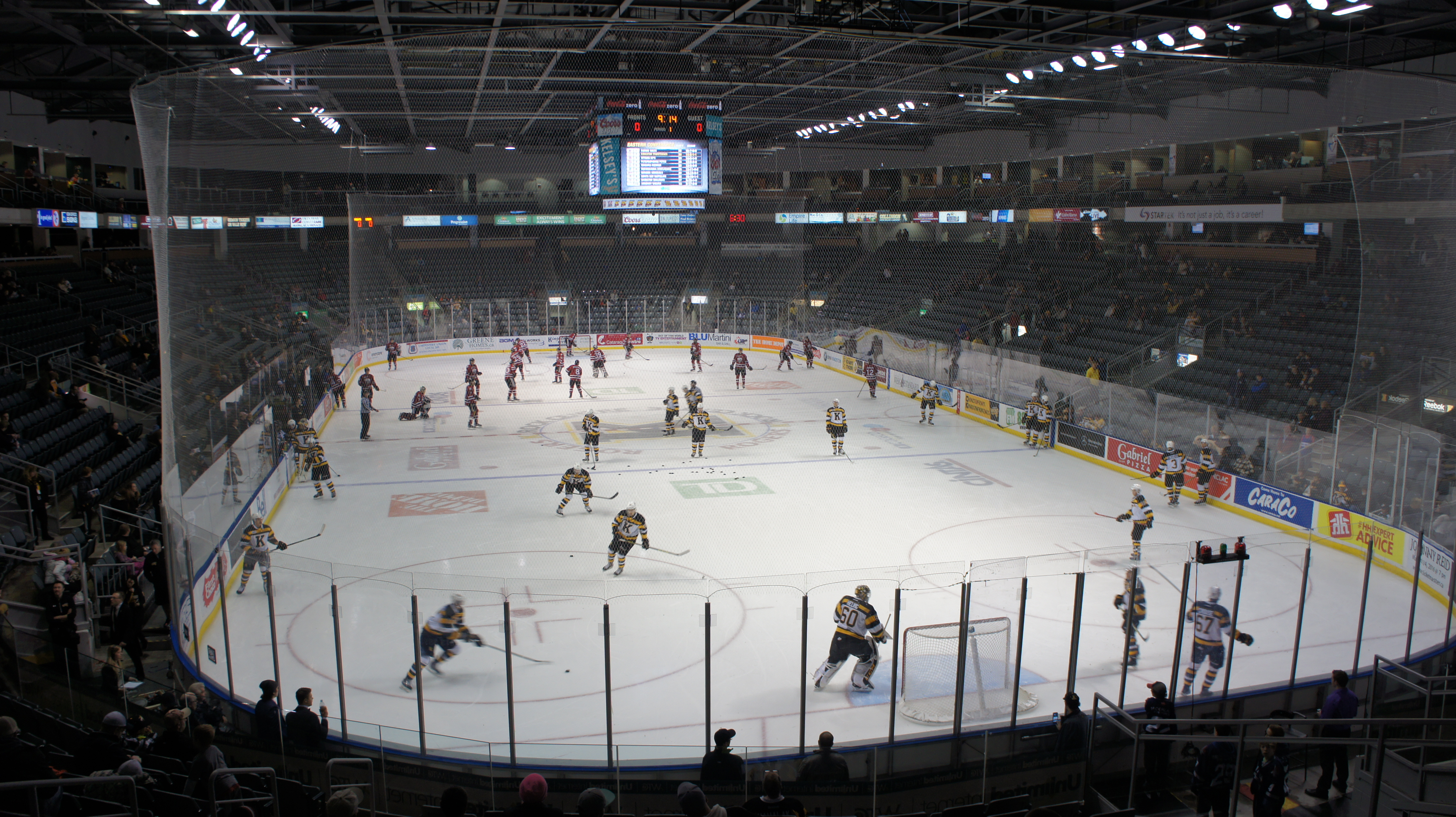
Slush Puppie Place (then Rogers K-Rock Centre) in its hockey formation, November 2015

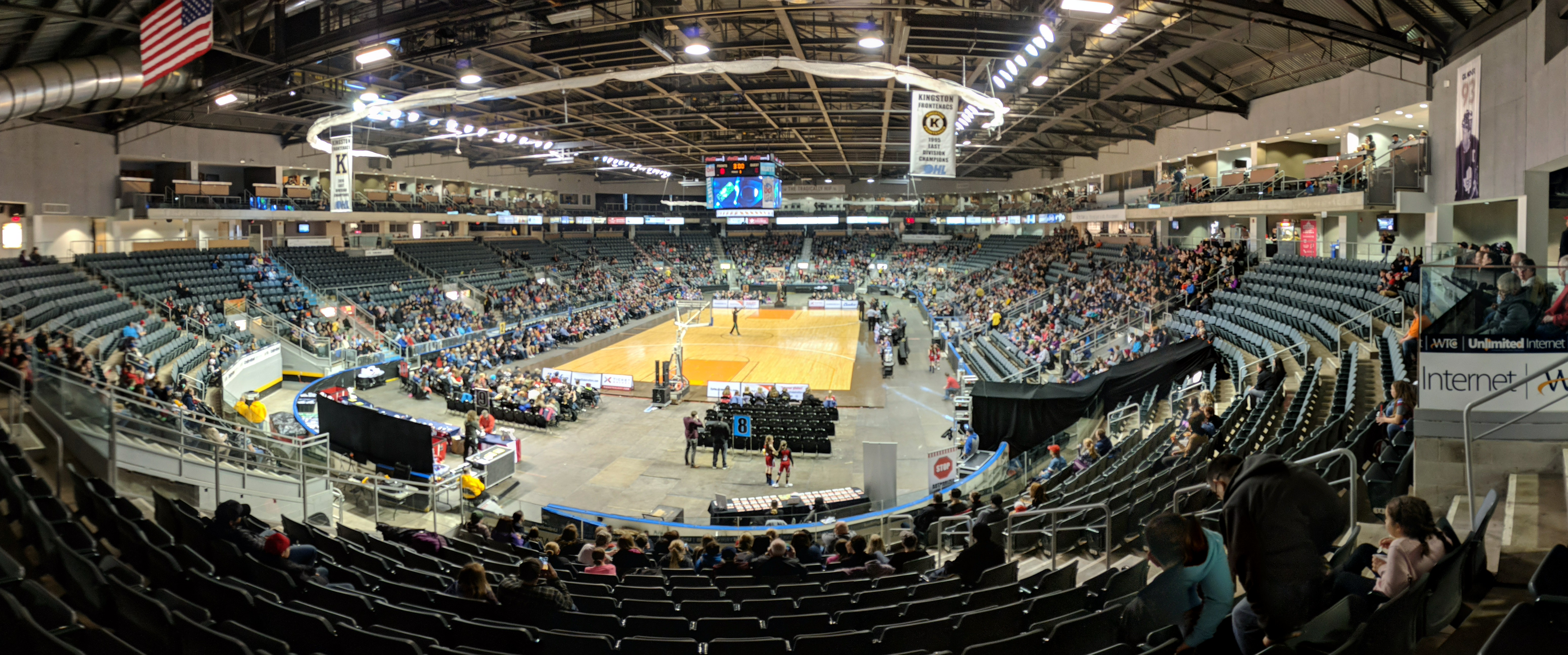
Slush Puppie Place (then Rogers K-Rock Centre) in its basketball formation, April 2018

=== Concerts ===
The inaugural concert at the arena was performed by Kingston-based The Tragically Hip on February 23, 2008. The arena has since hosted several concerts and entertainment events by artists including Elton John, Avril Lavigne, Neil Young, Cirque du Soleil, Deadmau5, Jerry Seinfeld, Bryan Adams, Bob Dylan, Willie Nelson, Carrie Underwood, Brooks & Dunn, Leonard Cohen, Reba McEntire, Billy Talent, Sting and hometown band, The Glorious Sons among many others.

On August 20, 2016, The Tragically Hip played the final concert of their Man Machine Poem Tour at the arena; the tour was announced after it was made public that lead singer Gord Downie had been diagnosed with terminal brain cancer. The concert was broadcast nationally by the CBC's radio, television, and digital platforms as the special presentation The Tragically Hip: A National Celebration. Prime Minister Justin Trudeau was also in attendance.

=== Curling ===
The arena has hosted multiple Curling Canada championships, including the 2013 Scotties Tournament of Hearts, and the 2020 Tim Hortons Brier; its hosting of the latter marked the bicentennial anniversary of Kingston's first organized curling game.

=== Figure skating ===
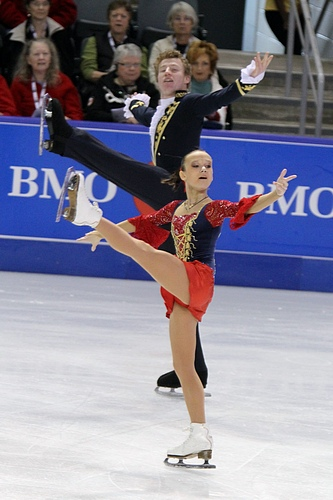
Liubov Iliushechkina and Nodari Maisuradze at the 2010 Skate Canada International.

The arena hosted the 2010 Skate Canada International and the 2015 Canadian Figure Skating Championships.

== Kingston and District Sports Hall of Fame ==
The Kingston and District Sports Hall of Fame is located inside Slush Puppie Place. The hall of fame honors any athlete or "builder of sport" (such as a coach) who has contributed meaningfully to sports in Kingston. Athletes must be retired from the sport for which they are nominated for at least three years or be older than 50. Builders are eligible at any time. The hall officially opened in 1996, and in 2008, it moved into Slush Puppie Place.
