= Man Machine Poem =

Studio album by the Tragically Hip
- Released: June 17, 2016
- Studios: The Bathouse, Bath, Loyalist, Ontario
- Genre: Alternative rock
- Length: 41:25
- Label: Universal
- Producers: Kevin Drew; Dave Hamelin

The Tragically Hip chronology
Now for Plan A (2012)	Man Machine Poem (2016)	Saskadelphia (2021)

Singles from Man Machine Poem
- 1. "In a World Possessed by the Human Mind" Released: 2016; 2. "Tired as Fuck" Released: 2016; 3. "What Blue" Released: 2016

Man Machine Poem is the thirteenth and final studio album by Canadian rock band the Tragically Hip, released on June 17, 2016 on Universal Music Canada. It is their last album to be released before the death of lead singer Gord Downie, as well as their last to be composed of new material. Produced by Kevin Drew and Dave Hamelin, the album is named after a track which appeared on the band's previous album Now for Plan A.

The album's first single, "In a World Possessed by the Human Mind", was released in April.

Prior to the album's release, the band announced that Gord Downie was diagnosed with a cancerous brain tumor in December 2015 and that the band would tour Canada in summer 2016 to support the album. The band and critics have cautioned, however, against interpreting the album in light of Downie's health, as it was written and recorded before his diagnosis. Although some media coverage has referred to it as the band's final album, the band reportedly worked on some new studio material after its release, and also have more than one album's worth of previously unreleased material that could be issued in the future as rarities compilations.

== Background ==
The album had been slated for release in March 2016 under the title Dougie Stardust, as a play on David Bowie's classic album The Rise and Fall of Ziggy Stardust and the Spiders from Mars; it had even begun appearing on music retail sites as a pre-order under that title. The band delayed the album's release after Downie suffered his second cancer-related seizure in February, and opted to retitle it in light of Bowie's death in January.

== Critical reception ==
Professional ratings
Review scores
Source	Rating
AllMusic	3.5/5 stars
Exclaim!	8/10

Writing in Exclaim!, Stuart Henderson described the album as "a darkly illuminated, late-career curveball likely to please and confound in equal measure. Rarely since their mid-1990s heyday has the multi-platinum-selling band sounded so intent on crafting something different." In the Edmonton Journal, Fish Griwkowsky described the album as "a deep-felt, summer highway album that briefly escapes the weight of the doom we all share — not alone, but together in the dark".

The album garnered a longlist nomination for the 2017 Polaris Music Prize, and won the Juno Award for Rock Album of the Year at the Juno Awards of 2017.

== Track listing ==
All tracks are written by The Tragically Hip.

Side one
No.	Title	Length
1.	"Man"	5:17
2.	"In a World Possessed by the Human Mind"	3:56
3.	"What Blue"	2:46
4.	"In Sarnia"	4:38
5.	"Here, in the Dark"	4:03

Side two
No.	Title	Length
6.	"Great Soul"	3:44
7.	"Tired as Fuck"	3:45
8.	"Hot Mic"	3:55
9.	"Ocean Next"	3:56
10.	"Machine"	5:29
Total length:		41:25

== Personnel ==
Personnel taken from Man Machine Poem liner notes.

The Tragically Hip

- Gord Downie – vocals
- Johnny Fay – drums, percussion
- Gord Sinclair – bass, vocals
- Rob Baker – guitar
- Paul Langlois – guitar, vocals

Additional musicians

- Dave Hamelin – keyboards, percussion
- Kevin Drew – keyboards, percussion

Technical personnel

- Kevin Drew – production
- Dave Hamelin – production, mixing
- Nyler Spencer – recording
- Eric Boulanger – mastering

== Charts ==
=== Weekly charts ===
Chart (2016)	Peak position
Canadian Albums (Billboard)	1
US Billboard 200	179
US Top Rock Albums (Billboard)	22

=== Year-end charts ===
Chart (2016)	Position
Canadian Albums (Billboard)	48
