= Music @ Work =

2000 studio album by the Tragically Hip

Studio album by The Tragically Hip
- Released: June 6, 2000
- Recorded: 1999
- Studio: The Bathouse, Bath, Ontario
- Genre: Alternative rock
- Length: 51:40
- Label: Universal
- Producer: Steve Berlin; Mark Vreeken; The Tragically Hip

The Tragically Hip chronology
Phantom Power (1998)	Music @ Work (2000)	In Violet Light (2002)

Singles from Music @ Work
- 1. "My Music at Work" Released: May 4, 2000; 2. "Lake Fever" Released: 2000; 3. "The Completists" Released: 2000; 4. "Freak Turbulence" Released: 2001

Professional ratings
Review scores
Source	Rating
AllMusic	3/5 stars
Robert Christgau	C
PopMatters	(favourable)

Music @ Work is the seventh studio album by Canadian rock band The Tragically Hip. The album was leaked via the internet six weeks before its official release in June, 2000. It won the 2001 Juno Award for Best Rock Album.

== Commercial performance ==
Music @ Work debuted at #1 on the Canadian Albums Chart, selling 45,396 copies in its first week. The album has been certified 2× Platinum in Canada.

== Track listing ==
All songs were written by The Tragically Hip.

No.	Title	Length
1.	"My Music at Work"	3:06
2.	"Tiger the Lion"	5:30
3.	"Lake Fever"	4:34
4.	"Putting Down"	3:13
5.	"Stay"	3:22
6.	"The Bastard"	4:54
7.	"The Completists"	3:07
8.	"Freak Turbulence"	2:53
9.	"Sharks"	4:14
10.	"Toronto #4"	2:59
11.	"Wild Mountain Honey"	3:56
12.	"Train Overnight"	3:17
13.	"The Bear"	3:55
14.	"As I Wind Down the Pines"	2:34

== Personnel ==
Personnel taken from Music @ Work liner notes.

The Tragically Hip

- Gord Downie – lead vocals
- Rob Baker – lead guitar
- Paul Langlois – rhythm guitar, backing vocals
- Gord Sinclair – bass, backing vocals
- Johnny Fay – drums

Additional musicians

- Steve Berlin – keyboards, percussion, MIDI sax
- Chris Brown – keyboards (2, 3, 11, 12)
- Julie Doiron – vocals (7, 10, 14)
- Sarah Pinette – cello (2, 10)
- Mr. Hussein – tabla (6)

Technical personnel

- Steve Berlin – production
- The Tragically Hip – production
- Mark Vreeken – recording, additional production
- Ken J. Friesen – recording assistance
- Graeme McCann – additional recording
- Aaron Keane – additional recording
- Steven Drake – mixing
- Bob Ludwig – mastering

== Year-end charts ==
Chart (2000)	Position
Canadian Albums (Nielsen SoundScan)	46
