= In Violet Light =

2002 studio album by the Tragically Hip

Studio album by The Tragically Hip
- Released: June 11, 2002
- Studio: Compass Point, Nassau; The Bathouse, Bath, Ontario
- Genre: Alternative rock
- Length: 45:16
- Label: Universal
- Producer: Hugh Padgham; Mark Vreeken; The Tragically Hip

The Tragically Hip chronology
Music @ Work (2000)	In Violet Light (2002)	In Between Evolution (2004)

Singles from In Violet Light
- 1. "It's a Good Life if You Don't Weaken" Released: 2002; 2. "Silver Jet" Released: 2002; 3. "The Darkest One" Released: 2002

Professional ratings
Review scores
Source	Rating
AllMusic	3/5 stars
Rolling Stone	(favourable)

In Violet Light is the eighth full-length album by Canadian rock band The Tragically Hip. The album debuted at #2 on the Canadian Albums Chart, selling almost 33,000 copies in its first week. The album has been certified platinum in Canada.

Packaged with the album in stores was a membership card for The Hip Club, an online fan club which offered three digital bonus tracks, "Forest Edge", "Problem Bears" and "Ultra Mundane".

The music video for "It's a Good Life, If You Don't Weaken" was filmed in Oshawa, Ontario, at Parkwood Estate. The light-hearted music video for "The Darkest One" featured Don Cherry and the Trailer Park Boys.

The song "Throwing Off Glass" was also released on the Men with Brooms soundtrack album.

At the Juno Awards of 2021, in the band's first live performance as a unit since Gord Downie's death in 2017, the band performed "It's a Good Life If You Don't Weaken" with Feist on vocals.

== Track listing ==
All songs by the Tragically Hip

No.	Title	Length
1.	"Are You Ready"	2:39
2.	"'Use It Up'"	4:16
3.	"The Darkest One"	4:36
4.	"It's a Good Life If You Don't Weaken'"	4:23
5.	"Silver Jet"	3:56
6.	"Throwing off Glass"	3:28
7.	"All Tore Up"	3:33
8.	"Leave"	3:59
9.	"A Beautiful Thing"	3:33
10.	"The Dire Wolf"	4:29
11.	"The Dark Canuck"	6:24

== The Tragically Hip ==
- Gord Downie – lead vocals
- Rob Baker – lead guitar
- Paul Langlois – rhythm guitar, backing vocals
- Gord Sinclair – bass, backing vocals
- Johnny Fay – drums

== Year-end charts ==
Year-end chart performance for In Violet Light
Chart (2002)	Position
Canadian Albums (Nielsen SoundScan)	52
Canadian Alternative Albums (Nielsen SoundScan)	14
