= My Music at Work =

2000 single by The Tragically Hip

Single by The Tragically Hip

from the album Music @ Work
- Released: May 4, 2000
- Genre: Rock
- Length: 3:07
- Label: Universal
- Songwriter: The Tragically Hip
- Producers: Steve Berlin, The Tragically Hip

The Tragically Hip singles chronology
"Bobcaygeon" (1999)	"My Music at Work" (2000)	"Lake Fever" (2000)

"My Music at Work" is a song by Canadian rock group The Tragically Hip. It is the first single and title track from the band's seventh studio album, Music @ Work. The song was a hit in the band's native country, peaking at No. 2 on Canada's Rock chart.

== Music video ==
The music video for "My Music at Work" was directed by Bruce McCulloch and filmed in the lobby of Commerce Court North, which is part of the headquarters for the Canadian bank CIBC. The video features the band performing under the pseudonym "The Filters". The band's musical performance in the video was filmed at The Opera House in Toronto on May 14, 2000.

=== Awards and nominations ===
- The music video was nominated for two awards at the 2000 MuchMusic Video Awards, with McCulloch winning for "Best Director".
- The video reached No. 1 on MuchMusic Countdown for two consecutive weeks between August 18 and 25.

== Covers ==
- At the WayHome Music & Arts Festival in 2016, the night after the Tragically Hip commenced their Man Machine Poem Tour, Arkells included a version of the song in their set.
- A cover of "My Music At Work" is included on the 2020 live album Wheatus M (Live in America) by the American band Wheatus.

== Charts ==
Chart (2000)	Peak position
Canadian RPM Singles Chart	47
Canadian RPM Rock Chart	2
