= In Between Evolution =

2004 studio album by the Tragically Hip

Studio album by The Tragically Hip
- Released: June 29, 2004
- Recorded: 2004
- Studios: Studio X (Seattle, Washington)
- Genre: Alternative rock
- Length: 45:28
- Label: Universal
- Producer: Adam Kasper

The Tragically Hip chronology
| In Violet Light (2002) | In Between Evolution (2004) | Hipeponymous (2005) |

Singles from In Between Evolution
- 1. "Vaccination Scar" Released: 2004; 2. "It Can't Be Nashville Every Night" Released: 2004; 3. "Gus: The Polar Bear from Central Park" Released: 2005

Professional ratings
Review scores
| Source | Rating |
|---|---|
| AllMusic | 4/5 stars |
| PopMatters | 4.5/5 stars |
| Rolling Stone | 4.5/5 stars |

In Between Evolution is the ninth studio album by the Canadian rock band the Tragically Hip. It was recorded at Studio X in Seattle and released June 29, 2004. The album debuted at number one in Canada, selling 22,500 copies in its first week. However, it got bumped off the number one spot by Avril Lavigne's Under My Skin. In Between Evolution was certified Platinum in Canada in September 2004.

One of the major themes on the album is a response to the 2003 invasion of Iraq. "Heaven Is a Better Place Today" doubles as a tribute to Dan Snyder, a player for the Atlanta Thrashers hockey team who died in an automobile accident nine months before the album's release, and for young men being sent to war.

The Hip performed a rough version of the song "It Can't be Nashville Every Night" on a season-two episode of the Canadian television sitcom Corner Gas, as a local band renting out main character Brent Leroy's garage for band practice.

== Track listing ==
All songs by the Tragically Hip

| No. | Title | Length |
|---|---|---|
| 1. | "Heaven Is a Better Place Today" | 2:55 |
| 2. | "Summer's Killing Us" | 3:26 |
| 3. | "Gus: The Polar Bear from Central Park" | 4:09 |
| 4. | "Vaccination Scar" | 2:57 |
| 5. | "It Can't Be Nashville Every Night" | 2:53 |
| 6. | "If New Orleans Is Beat" | 3:15 |
| 7. | "You're Everywhere" | 3:34 |
| 8. | "As Makeshift as We Are" | 3:15 |
| 9. | "Mean Streak" | 4:10 |
| 10. | "The Heart of the Melt" | 2:35 |
| 11. | "One Night in Copenhagen" | 2:20 |
| 12. | "Are We Family" | 4:34 |
| 13. | "Goodnight Josephine" | 3:25 |

=== Cover art ===
The album cover art was designed by Cameron Tomsett, a Canadian artist from Kingston.

== Personnel ==
The Tragically Hip

- Gord Downie – lead vocals
- Rob Baker – lead guitar
- Paul Langlois – rhythm guitar, backing vocals
- Gord Sinclair – bass, backing vocals
- Johnny Fay – drums

Production

- Adam Kasper – production, mixing
- Bob Ludwig – mastering
