= The Tragically Hip (EP) =

1987 EP by the Tragically Hip

EP by the Tragically Hip
- Released: December 1987
- Studios: Sounds Interchange (Toronto); Phase One (Toronto)
- Genres: Alternative rock; roots rock
- Length: 27:08
- Label: MCA
- Producer: Ken Greer

The Tragically Hip chronology
The Tragically Hip (1987)	Up to Here (1989)

Singles from The Tragically Hip
- 1. "Small Town Bringdown" Released: 1987; 2. "Highway Girl" Released: 1988; 3. "Last American Exit" Released: 1988

The Tragically Hip is the first release from Canadian rock band the Tragically Hip, released in 1987.

The EP was produced by Ken Greer of Red Rider, and consists of seven songs on cassette and eight songs on CD.

== Release ==
The EP was released in the Kingston area in late 1987, and nationally in January 1988.

In early 1988 the Hip went on their first cross-Canada tour lasting five weeks. The label's initial marketing strategy was to ignore major metropolitan markets such as Toronto, instead focusing on breaking the band in secondary markets and on campus radio; however, within weeks the band had made enough of a name for itself that they were playing Toronto venues like the Horseshoe Tavern by March.

In December 1988 they signed a long-term contract with MCA Records.

== Songs ==
It was the only album in the band's career on which the band members received separate individual songwriting credits rather than being credited collectively.

The EP was supported by the singles "Small Town Bringdown", "Highway Girl" and "Last American Exit".

A live version of "Highway Girl" was released in 1991 as a B-side to "Twist My Arm", in which Gord Downie tells the story of a suicide pact between a man and his girlfriend. It was a hit on Canadian radio, allowing the song to chart considerably higher than in its original form. The story contains some lines which would later recur as lyrics in the band's 1992 single "Locked in the Trunk of a Car"; it ends with Downie exclaiming "Get Mr. Ry Cooder to deliver my eulogy", which would also recur in "At the Hundredth Meridian". The album version was also the only song from this EP to be included in the Yer Favourites fan-picked compilation of 2005.

== Critical reception ==
Professional ratings
Review scores
Source	Rating
AllMusic	2/5 stars

Mike Degagne of AllMusic wrote that the album "is blanketed with a roadside texture that is interesting because it harnesses their music in its rawest and earliest stages. Gord Downie has not yet mastered his poetic rigidity or his soothsayer approach to obscure experiences and events here, as he does on future albums," but noted that "just because the band hasn't yet mastered their musicianship as a whole, doesn't mean the album is a total washout, either." He singled out "Small Town Bringdown" and "Last American Exit" as strong songs, stating that the latter was good enough that it could have been on Road Apples.

Evelyn Erskine of the Ottawa Citizen wrote that "The Hip's influences range from The Doors to The Pretty Things. If there are any flaws, it is that these influences can at times be too transparent. For example, vocalist Gord Downie has fleeting moments where he sounds more like Jim Morrison than he should. But The Hip mixes the tough and the poetic in a manner that is alluring in its hands. The rough guitars that mingle with graceful melodies provide an enticing contrast."

Greg Burliuk of the band's hometown Kingston Whig-Standard was the most positive overall, writing that "though it contains only seven songs, rush out and grab this Kingston band's recording debut, so that you can say you were among the first to jump on the bandwagon. If the current trend towards rough-edged guitar bands holds, The Hip should find itself streaking towards the top in short order. This mini-album, originally intended simply as a demo, should help that ascent." He predicted, ultimately correctly, that "Downie is a first-rate singer who I think one day will be considered one of Canada's best. So may this band."

Matt Sheardown of Stylus Magazine later reflected: "While [the band's] later offerings would be more heavily influenced by edgier sounds, their debut EP's brand of roots-rock sent obvious nods towards fellow Canadians of notable stature—Neil Young and The Band. That 1987 self-titled EP showed enough raw energy that The Hip were inked for a full-length debut with MCA Records."

== Track listing ==
Side One
No.	Title	Lyrics	Music	Length
1.	"Small Town Bringdown"	Gord Sinclair	Sinclair	3:05
2.	"Last American Exit"	Sinclair	Sinclair	3:50
3.	"Killing Time"	Gord Downie	Bobby Baker	4:50

Side Two
No.	Title	Lyrics	Music	Length
4.	"Evelyn"	Sinclair	Sinclair	2:25
5.	"Cemetery Sideroad"	Downie	Sinclair	3:15
6.	"I'm a Werewolf, Baby"	Downie	Baker; Johnny Fay; Sinclair	3:20
7.	"Highway Girl"	Downie	Baker	3:28

CD Bonus Track
No.	Title	Writer(s)	Length
8.	"All Canadian Surf Club"	Sinclair; Baker	2:50

== Personnel ==
The Tragically Hip

- Gord Downie – lead vocals
- Bobby Baker – lead guitar
- Paul Langlois – rhythm guitar, backing vocals
- Gord Sinclair – bass, backing vocals
- Johnny Fay – drums

Technical personnel

- Ken Greer – production (tracks 1–5)
- Don Wershba – mixing (tracks 1–5)
- Randy Staub – recording (tracks 6, 7)
- Scott Boyling – engineering (tracks 1–5)
- Tommy Eymundson – engineering assistance (tracks 1–5)
- Bill Kennedy – recording assistance (tracks 6, 7)
- Tony Maserati – mixing assistance (tracks 1–5)
- Scott Gootman – mixing assistance (1–5)
- Greg Calbi – mastering
- Jeanne Bradshaw – design

== Certifications ==
Region	Certification	Certified units/sales
Canada (Music Canada)	3× Platinum	300,000^{‡}
^{‡} Sales+streaming figures based on certification alone.
