= Man Machine Poem Tour =

2016 concert tour by the Tragically Hip

- Tour by The Tragically Hip
- Tour poster
- Location: Canada
- Associated album: Man Machine Poem
- Start date: July 22, 2016
- End date: August 20, 2016
- No. of shows: 15

The Man Machine Poem Tour was a concert tour by the Tragically Hip in support of their thirteenth full-length studio album Man Machine Poem. The tour consisted of 15 shows, the first held on July 22, 2016, in Victoria, British Columbia, and the last held on August 20, 2016, at Rogers K-Rock Centre in Kingston, Ontario.

The tour was announced on May 25, 2016, following an announcement the previous day regarding singer Gord Downie's brain cancer diagnosis. A portion of the proceeds of the tour were donated to the Sunnybrook Foundation, the independent fundraising arm of the Sunnybrook Health Sciences Centre; in addition to the ticket sale proceeds themselves, both Sunnybrook and the Canadian Cancer Society reported a significant increase in direct donations, totalling over one million dollars, from the public during the tour. CBC broadcast the tour's final concert in Kingston on its radio, television, and digital platforms, which was seen by 11.7 million viewers across all platforms, and a DVD and Blu-ray of the concert was released in December 2017.

Although generally reported by the media as such, at the time the band refrained from officially labelling the concerts as their farewell tour, and instead communicated the hope that Downie's health would remain stable enough for them to tour again in the future. However, Downie died of the illness on October 17, 2017. In July 2018, guitarist Rob Baker declared that the Tragically Hip were now inactive and the members had no plans to perform under the name again without Downie.

== Cultural analysis ==
Throughout the summer, the nature of the tour resulted in a considerable volume of analysis of the band, the tour and its impact on Canadian culture appearing in the media. This included a number of international outlets which had never before devoted significant coverage to the band, including CNN, BBC News, The Guardian and The New Yorker.

Canadian media outlets which would ordinarily only publish reviews of local concerts published an ongoing series of reviews of every stop on the tour, including unusually thorough analysis of the setlists.

The newsmagazine Maclean's published interviews throughout the summer with other musicians and cultural figures who had been friends, fans, collaborators or tourmates of the band, including Jim Cuddy of Blue Rodeo, Geoffrey Kelly of Spirit of the West, John K. Samson of The Weakerthans, Dave Bidini of Rheostatics, Peter Garrett of Midnight Oil, novelist Joseph Boyden, singer-songwriters Joel Plaskett and Sarah Harmer, and record producer Steve Berlin.

Both Maclean's and the Toronto Star also sent journalists to the town of Bobcaygeon, Ontario to explore the impact of one of the Tragically Hip's most famous songs, "Bobcaygeon".

== Ticket sales controversy ==
Due to the news of Downie's cancer diagnosis, demand for tickets was higher than for any of the band's concert tours since the 1990s. However, many fans ended up stymied by ticket scalpers; even in the advance presale to members of the band's fan club, all available tickets were sold out within minutes, and many tickets almost immediately began showing up on resale sites such as StubHub, at inflated prices of up to $5,000 for the Kingston show, and up to $1,300 for most other shows. The same occurred when general market tickets were released; in some cities, the general release tickets were entirely sold out less than one minute after going on sale. One scalper even set up a dedicated domain, thehiptickets.com.

The band described themselves as sad and concerned by the situation, but noted that ticket sales were largely out of their own control. They responded by adding further shows to the tour, and by redesigning the planned stage configuration in order to release additional seats. Ontario's provincial government announced plans to review its regulations around ticket sales, and two scalpers were arrested in Winnipeg. The public outcry led CBC Television to explore options for broadcast of the Kingston show, and also resulted in a record number of booking requests for the Practically Hip, a long-running Tragically Hip tribute band, to play private Tragically Hip tribute parties across Canada.

Jesse Modz, a DJ for CHTZ-FM in St. Catharines, Ontario, aired a segment on his radio show in which he fooled a scalper in Mississauga into driving to St. Catharines by offering a $300 premium on top of the asking price; when the scalper arrived, Modz did not purchase the tickets, but rather confronted him about the ethics of scalping.

Canadian music journalist Alan Cross called the situation "the most cold-blooded, market-driven display of capitalism that we've ever seen involving Canadian concerts."

In October 2016, Live Nation Entertainment formally admitted for the first time that at least two-thirds of all tickets for the tour were snapped up by ticket brokers, leaving less than one-third of the tickets available to be purchased at face value by fans.

In February 2017, the government of Ontario formally announced that it would introduce legislation to ban "scalper bots".

== Final concert ==
The final show on the tour was held on August 20, 2016 at the Rogers K-Rock Centre in the band's hometown of Kingston. The concert was simulcast in a special, The Tragically Hip: A National Celebration, airing commercial-free across the CBC's television and radio outlets, including CBC Television, CBC Radio One and CBC Radio 2, as well as on SiriusXM satellite radio, and online via CBC Music and YouTube. CBC broke away from its second-last night of primetime coverage of the 2016 Summer Olympics to air the concert; Ron Maclean hosted a short introduction from Rio de Janeiro, where the Canadian Olympic athletes were themselves gathered for a viewing party at Canada House. At the end of the introduction, Maclean said: "We now go to this late breaking story on the CBC" referencing not only the concert itself but a lyric from the Tragically Hip song "Wheat Kings". The concert was attended by Canadian Prime Minister Justin Trudeau upon request by the band.

At least 11.7 million watched part of the concert across these platforms; 4.3 million were watching the television broadcast, while precise breakdowns of radio listeners, online streaming viewers or attendees at public screening parties have not been released. Public viewing was also set up in Kingston at the Springer Market Square and attended by approximately 22,000 people. Many other towns and cities across Canada also hosted public broadcasts of the concert. One particularly noted example was in Bobcaygeon, which held a public viewing on its main street; in addition to local residents, the event was also attended by a significant number of people who had made a "pilgrimage" to view the concert there because of the song.

On the same night as the Kingston concert, American rock band Pearl Jam were performing in Chicago; lead singer Eddie Vedder paid tribute to Downie and dedicated a performance of "Light Years" to Downie and the Tragically Hip. Canadian band Blue Rodeo were also performing a previously scheduled concert in Toronto on the same night; during that show, they performed a rendition of "Bobcaygeon" as video screens around the venue displayed scenes from the concurrent Hip concert in Kingston. Longtime Blue Rodeo guitarist and mandolinist Bob Egan, who was retiring from music and performing his final show with the band that evening, had been a guest musician on the original Tragically Hip recording of the song.

The CBC aired an encore of the concert on June 24, 2017.

The Kingston concert was released on DVD in December 2017, under the title A National Celebration. The DVD was released both on its own and as a box set with the documentary film Long Time Running.

In 2020, Cineplex Entertainment announced that select Canadian theatres would run a double bill of A National Celebration and Long Time Running in the week of September 18 as a special event.

The concert is slated to receive a tenth anniversary rebroadcast on August 22, 2026, concurrently with the release of The Tragically Hip: Live July 22 – August 20, 2016, a live album compiling performances from the tour.

== Honours ==
The tour resulted in Downie being selected by the Canadian Press as its Canadian Newsmaker of the Year for 2016. This marked the first time in the award's history that a musician was chosen. Downie's death resulted in his being selected as Newsmaker of the Year again in 2017.

At the 5th Canadian Screen Awards, the CBC's broadcast of the final concert was nominated for and won six awards, including Best Live Entertainment Special, Best Direction in a Variety or Sketch Comedy Program or Series (Dave Russell), Best Production Design or Art Direction in a Non-Fiction Program or Series (Brent Clark), Best Photography in a Variety Program or Series (Alex Nadon and Tyler Pigeon), Best Sound in a Variety or Animated Program or Series (Jay Vicari, Peter Gary, Jon Erickson, Lee Moro and Mark Vreeken), and Best Performance in a Variety or Sketch Comedy Program or Series (The Tragically Hip).

The band and the tour are the subjects of Jennifer Baichwal and Nicholas de Pencier's documentary film Long Time Running, which premiered at the 2017 Toronto International Film Festival.

== Set lists ==
The set list for each show was different. Typically the band played 20 or 21 songs followed by a three-song encore and then an additional two-song encore. For the final show, the band played 21 songs and then returned to play three encores of three songs each.

At virtually all shows, all songs from the same album were performed consecutively in sets of two, three or four, with that album not subsequently returned to for the rest of the show. Only a few times over the course of the tour was this pattern deviated from at all, normally for just one song.

The only unplayed album on the tour was their debut EP The Tragically Hip. No song in the band's catalogue was performed at all 15 shows; the band's 1990s signature songs "Ahead by a Century", "Bobcaygeon" and "Poets", and their more recent single "What Blue", were the most-played songs overall, having been performed at all but one or two of the shows.

Victoria

Set

1. "Boots or Hearts"
2. "New Orleans is Sinking"
3. "Opiated"
4. "Blow at High Dough"
5. "Machine"
6. "What Blue"
7. "Tired as Fuck"
8. "In a World Possessed by the Human Mind"
9. Intermission
10. "Something On"
11. "Poets"
12. "Bobcaygeon"
13. "Fireworks"
14. "Family Band"
15. "The Lonely End of the Rink"
16. "Yer Not the Ocean"
17. "In View"
18. "The Last of the Unplucked Gems"
19. "The Luxury"
20. "Little Bones"
21. "Long Time Running"
22. "Twist My Arm"

Encore One

1. "Eldorado"
2. "Wheat Kings"
3. "At the Hundredth Meridian"

Encore Two

1. "Gift Shop"
2. "Ahead by a Century"
Vancouver I

Set

1. "Twist My Arm"
2. "Three Pistols"
3. "The Luxury"
4. "Little Bones"
5. "Machine"
6. "Tired as Fuck"
7. "What Blue"
8. "In a World Possessed by the Human Mind"
9. Intermission
10. "At Transformation"
11. "Man Machine Poem"
12. "The Lookahead"
13. "We Want to Be It"
14. "Membership"
15. "Fireworks"
16. "Bobcaygeon"
17. "Poets"
18. "Daredevil"
19. "So Hard Done By"
20. "Thugs"
21. "Grace, Too"

Encore One

1. "Fully Completely"
2. "Wheat Kings"
3. "Locked in the Trunk of a Car"

Encore Two

1. "Opiated"
2. "New Orleans is Sinking"
Vancouver II

Set

1. "Courage (for Hugh MacLennan)"
2. "Fifty-Mission Cap"
3. "We'll Go Too"
4. "At the Hundredth Meridian"
5. "In a World Possessed by the Human Mind"
6. "What Blue"
7. "In Sarnia"
8. "Machine"
9. Intermission
10. "My Music at Work"
11. "Lake Fever"
12. "Toronto #4"
13. "Putting Down"
14. "Greasy Jungle"
15. "Grace, Too"
16. "Yawning or Snarling"
17. "Daredevil"
18. "Ahead by a Century"
19. "Don't Wake Daddy"
20. "Springtime in Vienna"
21. "Gift Shop"

Encore One

1. "Escape is at Hand for the Travelling Man"
2. "Bobcaygeon"
3. "Poets"

Encore Two

1. "Fiddler's Green"
2. "Three Pistols"
Edmonton I

Set

1. "Little Bones"
2. "The Luxury"
3. "Long Time Running"
4. "Twist My Arm"
5. "In a World Possess by the Human Mind"
6. "What Blue"
7. "Ocean Next"
8. "Machine"
9. Intermission
10. "Summer's Killing Us"
11. "It Can't be Nashville Every Night"
12. "If New Orleans is Beat"
13. "Gus: The Polar Bear from Central Park"
14. "Daredevil"
15. "Scared"
16. "So Hard Done By"
17. "Grace, Too"
18. "Escape is at Hand for the Traveling Man"
19. "Membership"
20. "Something On"
21. "Poets"

Encore One

1. "At the Hundredth Meridian"
2. "Fully Completely"
3. "Courage (for Hugh MacLennan)"

Encore Two

1. "Flamenco"
2. "Ahead by a Century"
Edmonton II

Set

1. "Blow at High Dough"
2. "Opiated"
3. "Boots or Hearts"
4. "New Orleans is Sinking"
5. "In a World Possessed by the Human Mind"
6. "Tired as Fuck"
7. "What Blue"
8. "Machine"
9. Intermission
10. "Now the Struggle Has a Name"
11. "The Last Recluse"
12. "Coffee Girl"
13. "Morning Moon"
14. "Courage (for Hugh MacLennan)"
15. "At the Hundredth Meridian"
16. "Wheat Kings"
17. "Fifty-Mission Cap"
18. "Gift Shop"
19. "Don't Wake Daddy"
20. "Springtime in Vienna"
21. "Ahead by a Century"

Encore One

1. "Greasy Jungle"
2. "Scared"
3. "Grace, Too"

Encore Two

1. "Fireworks"
2. "Bobcaygeon"
Calgary I

Set

1. "Three Pistols"
2. "Twist My Arm"
3. "Fiddler's Green"
4. "Little Bones"
5. "In a World Possessed by the Human Mind"
6. "What Blue"
7. "Ocean Next"
8. "Machine"
9. Intermission
10. "In View"
11. "The Kids Don't Get It"
12. "World Container"
13. "Yer Not the Ocean"
14. "So Hard Done By"
15. "Grace, Too"
16. "Yawning or Snarling"
17. "Daredevil"
18. "Something On"
19. "Escape is at Hand for the Travelling Man"
20. "Poets"
21. "Bobcaygeon"

Encore One

1. "Gift Shop"
2. "Flamenco"
3. "Ahead by a Century"

Encore Two

1. "Boots or Hearts"
2. "Blow at High Dough"
Calgary II

Set

1. "New Orleans is Sinking"
2. "Opiated"
3. "Boots or Hearts"
4. "Blow at High Dough"
5. "In a World Possessed by the Human Mind"
6. "In Sarnia"
7. "What Blue"
8. "Machine"
9. Intermission
10. "Thugs"
11. "Greasy Jungle"
12. "Scared"
13. "Grace, Too"
14. "Use It Up"
15. "It's a Good Life if You Don't Weaken"
16. "Throwing Off Glass"
17. "The Dire Wolf"
18. "Gift Shop"
19. "Don't Wake Daddy"
20. "Ahead by a Century"
21. "Springtime in Vienna"

Encore One

1. "Fireworks"
2. "Bobcaygeon"
3. "Poets"

Encore Two

1. "Wheat Kings"
2. "Courage (for Hugh MacLennan)"
Winnipeg

Set

1. "At the Hundredth Meridian"
2. "Pigeon Camera"
3. "Courage (for Hugh MacLennan)"
4. "Wheat Kings"
5. "Machine"
6. "Tired as Fuck"
7. "What Blue"
8. "In a World Possessed by the Human Mind"
9. Intermission
10. "Streets Ahead"
11. "The Lookahead"
12. "Man Machine Poem"
13. "At Transformation"
14. "Escape is at Hand for the Travelling Man"
15. "Poets"
16. "Bobcaygeon"
17. "Membership"
18. "The Last of the Unplucked Gems"
19. "Little Bones"
20. "The Luxury"
21. "Long Time Running"
22. "Twist My Arm"

Encore One

1. "Boots or Hearts"
2. "Opiated"
3. "New Orleans is Sinking"

Encore Two

1. "Springtime in Vienna"
2. "Ahead by a Century"
London

Set

1. "Opiated"
2. "Blow at High Dough"
3. "Boots or Hearts"
4. "New Orleans is Sinking"
5. "In a World Possessed by the Human Mind"
6. "Ocean Next"
7. "What Blue"
8. "Machine"
9. Intermission
10. "Summer's Killing Us"
11. "Gus: The Polar Bear from Central Park"
12. "If New Orleans is Beat"
13. "It Can't be Nashville Every Night"
14. "Grace, Too"
15. "Scared"
16. "So Hard Done By"
17. "Daredevil"
18. "Something On"
19. "Poets"
20. "Bobcaygeon"
21. "Fireworks"

Encore One

1. "Fully Completely"
2. "Pigeon Camera"
3. "Courage (for Hugh MacLennan)"

Encore Two

1. "Fiddler's Green"
Toronto I

Set

1. "The Luxury"
2. "Little Bones"
3. "Fiddler's Green"
4. "Three Pistols"
5. "In a World Possessed by the Human Mind"
6. "Tired as Fuck"
7. "What Blue"
8. "Machine"
9. Intermission
10. "My Music at Work"
11. "Lake Fever"
12. "Toronto #4"
13. "Putting Down"
14. "Gift Shop"
15. "Springtime in Vienna"
16. "Flamenco"
17. "Ahead by a Century"
18. "Fully Completely"
19. "At the Hundredth Meridian"
20. "Wheat Kings"
21. "Fifty-Mission Cap"

Encore One

1. "Grace, Too"
2. "So Hard Done By"
3. "Nautical Disaster"

Encore Two

1. "Bobcaygeon"
2. "Poets"
Toronto II

Set

1. "Courage (for Hugh MacLennan)"
2. "Locked in the Trunk of a Car"
3. "Eldorado"
4. "At the Hundredth Meridian"
5. "In a World Possessed by the Human Mind"
6. "In Sarnia"
7. "What Blue"
8. "Machine"
9. Intermission
10. "The Dire Wolf"
11. "Use it Up"
12. "It's a Good Life if You Don't Weaken"
13. "Throwing Off Glass"
14. "Grace, Too"
15. "Greasy Jungle"
16. "Scared"
17. "Nautical Disaster"
18. "Membership"
19. "Bobcaygeon"
20. "Something On"
21. "Fireworks"

Encore One

1. "New Orleans is Sinking"
2. "Boots or Hearts"
3. "Blow at High Dough"

Encore Two

1. "Gift Shop"
2. "Ahead by a Century"
Toronto III

Set

1. "Blow at High Dough"
2. "New Orleans is Sinking"
3. "Opiated"
4. "Boots or Hearts"
5. "Machine"
6. "What Blue"
7. "Ocean Next"
8. "In a World Possessed by the Human Mind"
9. Intermission
10. "Streets Ahead"
11. "We Want to Be It"
12. "Man Machine Poem"
13. "At Transformation"
14. "Gift Shop"
15. "Flamenco"
16. "Springtime in Vienna"
17. "Ahead by a Century"
18. "Three Pistols"
19. "Twist My Arm"
20. "Long Time Running"
21. "Little Bones"

Encore One

1. "Escape is at Hand for the Travelling Man"
2. "Poets"
3. "Bobcaygeon"

Encore Two

1. "Daredevil"
2. "Grace, Too"
Hamilton

Set

1. "At the Hundredth Meridian"
2. "Courage (for Hugh MacLennan)"
3. "Eldorado"
4. "Fifty-Mission Cap"
5. "In a World Possessed by the Human Mind"
6. "What Blue"
7. "In Sarnia"
8. "Machine"
9. Intermission
10. "The Lonely End of the Rink"
11. "Yer Not the Ocean"
12. "Family Band"
13. "In View"
14. "So Hard Done By"
15. "Grace, Too"
16. "Scared"
17. "Daredevil"
18. "Escape is at Hand for the Travelling Man"
19. "Something On"
20. "Fireworks"
21. "Poets"

Encore One

1. "Gift Shop"
2. "Don't Wake Daddy"
3. "Ahead by a Century"

Encore Two

1. "Fiddler's Green"
2. "Twist My Arm"
Ottawa

Set

1. "Boots or Hearts"
2. "Blow at high Dough"
3. "Opiated"
4. "New Orleans is Sinking"
5. "In a World Possessed by the Human Mind"
6. "Ocean Next"
7. "What Blue"
8. "Machine"
9. Intermission
10. "Summer's Killing Us"
11. "Gus: The Polar Bear from Central Park"
12. "If New Orleans is Beat"
13. "It Can't be Nashville Every Night"
14. "Greasy Jungle"
15. "Nautical Disaster"
16. "So Hard Done By"
17. "Grace, Too"
18. "Gift Shop"
19. "Flamenco"
20. "Springtime in Vienna"
21. "Ahead by a Century"

Encore One

1. "Courage (for Hugh MacLennan)
2. "Wheat Kings"
3. "At the Hundredth Meridian"

Encore Two

1. "Bobcaygeon"
2. "Poets"
Kingston

Set

1. "Fifty-Mission Cap"
2. "Courage (for Hugh MacLennan)"
3. "Wheat Kings"
4. "At the Hundredth Meridian"
5. "In a World Possessed by the Human Mind"
6. "What Blue"
7. "Tired as Fuck"
8. "Machine"
9. Intermission
10. "My Music at Work"
11. "Lake Fever"
12. "Toronto #4"
13. "Putting Down"
14. "Twist My Arm"
15. "Three Pistols"
16. "Fiddler's Green"
17. "Little Bones"
18. "The Last of the Unplucked Gems"
19. "Something On"
20. "Poets"
21. "Bobcaygeon"
22. "Fireworks"

Encore One

1. "New Orleans is Sinking"
2. "Boots or Hearts"
3. "Blow at High Dough"

Encore Two

1. "Nautical Disaster"
2. "Scared"
3. "Grace, Too"

Encore Three

1. "Locked in the Trunk of a Car"
2. "Gift Shop"
3. "Ahead by a Century"

== Tour dates ==
List of 2016 tour dates, showing date, city, country, venue
Date (2016)	City	Country	Venue
July 22	Victoria	Canada	Save-On-Foods Memorial Centre
July 24	Vancouver	Canada	Rogers Arena
July 26	Vancouver	Canada	Rogers Arena
July 28	Edmonton	Canada	Rexall Place
July 30	Edmonton	Canada	Rexall Place
August 1	Calgary	Canada	Scotiabank Saddledome
August 3	Calgary	Canada	Scotiabank Saddledome
August 5	Winnipeg	Canada	MTS Centre
August 8	London	Canada	Budweiser Gardens
August 10	Toronto	Canada	Air Canada Centre
August 12	Toronto	Canada	Air Canada Centre
August 14	Toronto	Canada	Air Canada Centre
August 16	Hamilton	Canada	FirstOntario Centre
August 18	Ottawa	Canada	Canadian Tire Centre
August 20	Kingston	Canada	Rogers K-Rock Centre

List of box office score data with date, city, venue, attendance, gross
Date (2016)	City	Venue	Attendance	Gross
August 8	London, Canada	Budweiser Gardens	9,934 / 9,934	$793,981
August 10	Toronto, Canada	Air Canada Centre	54,566 / 54,566	$4,743,640
August 12	Toronto, Canada	Air Canada Centre	54,566 / 54,566	$4,743,640
August 14	Toronto, Canada	Air Canada Centre	54,566 / 54,566	$4,743,640
