= The Tragically Hip =

Canadian rock band

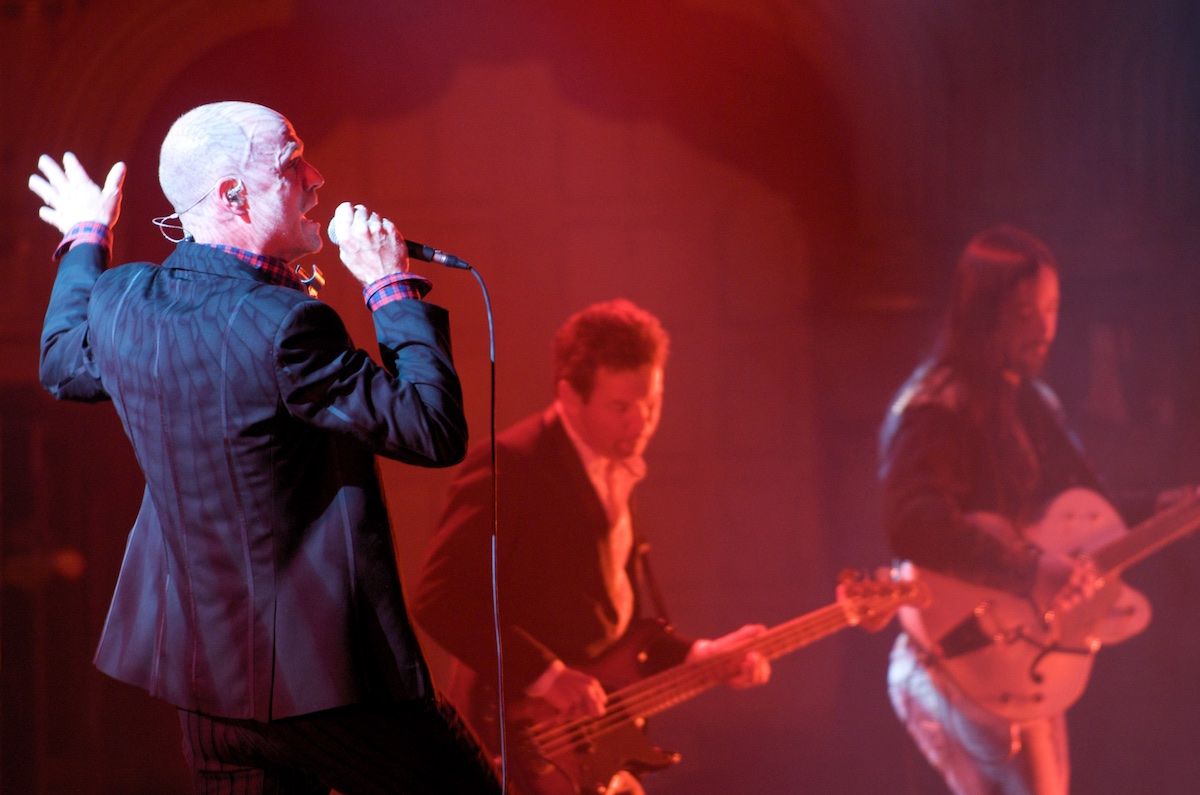
- The Tragically Hip play during a stop at the Orpheum in Vancouver on June 22, 2009, during their tour supporting the album We Are the Same

Background information
- Origin: Kingston, Ontario, Canada
- Genres: Alternative rock; roots rock; folk rock
- Years active: 1984–2017
- Labels: Universal Canada; Sire; MCA; Atlantic; Zoë
- Past members: Rob Baker; Gord Downie; Johnny Fay; Gord Sinclair; Davis Manning; Paul Langlois
- Website: thehip.com

The Tragically Hip, often referred to simply as the Hip, was a Canadian rock band formed in Kingston, Ontario, in 1984, consisting of vocalist Gord Downie, guitarist Paul Langlois, guitarist Rob Baker (known as Bobby Baker until 1994), bassist Gord Sinclair, and drummer Johnny Fay. They released 13 studio albums, two live albums, two EPs, and over 50 singles over a 33-year career. Nine of their albums have reached No. 1 on the Canadian charts. They have received numerous Canadian music awards, including 17 Juno Awards. Between 1996 and 2016, the Tragically Hip were the best-selling Canadian band in Canada and the fourth best-selling Canadian artist overall in Canada.

Following Downie's diagnosis with terminal brain cancer in 2015, the band undertook a tour of Canada in support of their thirteenth album, Man Machine Poem. The tour's final concert, which would ultimately be the band's last show, was held at the Rogers K-Rock Centre in Kingston on August 20, 2016, and broadcast globally by the Canadian Broadcasting Corporation as a cross-platform television, radio and internet streaming special.

After Downie died on October 17, 2017, the band announced in July 2018 that they would no longer perform under the name. The surviving members have, however, continued to pursue other musical projects, and have begun releasing deluxe reissues of their albums featuring previously unreleased songs from the band's archives. They have also since reunited for occasional special performances in collaboration with singer-songwriters such as Feist and William Prince.

== History ==
=== Formation ===
The Tragically Hip formed in 1984 in Kingston, Ontario. Gord Sinclair and Rob Baker were students at Kingston Collegiate and had performed together at the KCVI Variety Show as the Rodents. Baker and Sinclair joined with Downie and Fay in 1984 and began playing gigs around Kingston with some memorable stints at Clark Hall Pub and Alfie's, student bars on Queen's University campus. Guitarist Paul Langlois joined in 1986; saxophonist Davis Manning left that same year. They took their name from a skit in the Michael Nesmith movie Elephant Parts.

=== 1987–1991 ===
By the mid-1980s, they performed in small music venues across Ontario, and were signed to a management contract with Jake Gold and Allan Gregg in 1986. Gregg underwrote the cost of their eponymous EP The Tragically Hip, released in 1987. In late 1988, the band performed a showcase for then-MCA Vice President Bruce Dickinson at the Horseshoe Tavern in Toronto. They were then signed to a long-term record deal with MCA, and recorded 1989's Up to Here. This album produced four singles, "Blow at High Dough", "New Orleans Is Sinking", "Boots or Hearts", and "38 Years Old". All four of these songs found extensive rotation on modern rock radio play lists in Canada.

Road Apples followed in 1991, producing three singles ("Little Bones", "Twist My Arm", and "Three Pistols") and reaching No. 1 on Canadian record charts. During the Road Apples tour, Downie became recognized for ranting and telling fictional stories during songs such as "Highway Girl" and "New Orleans Is Sinking". Road Apples was planned to be a double album but was rejected by Universal. The 2008 Universal Studios fire resulted in the destruction of the masters for the second album. The six unreleased songs were rediscovered in another collection in 2020. In 2021 they were released as an EP titled Saskadelphia, which had been the working title for Road Apples.

The sound on these first two full-length albums is sometimes characterized as "blues-tinged", although there is definite acoustic punctuation throughout both discs. Although the band failed to achieve significant international success with these first two albums, their sales and dominance of modern rock radio in Canada gave them license to subsequently explore their sound.

=== 1992–1997 ===
The band released another album, Fully Completely, in 1992, which produced the singles "Locked in the Trunk of a Car", "Courage", "At the Hundredth Meridian", and three others. The sound on this album displayed less of a blues influence than previous albums. The Hip created and headlined the first Another Roadside Attraction tour at this time, which also featured Midnight Oil, Crash Vegas, Hothouse Flowers and Daniel Lanois. The five artists on the tour collaborated together on the 1993 charity single "Land", which protested forest clearcutting in British Columbia.

Many songs from Day For Night were first performed prior to their release during the 1993 Another Roadside Attraction Tour. "Nautical Disaster" was played frequently in the middle of "New Orleans Is Sinking", an early version of "Thugs" was tested, and Downie sang lyrics from many other Day For Night songs, such as "Grace, Too", "Scared", and "Emergency", during this tour.

Day for Night was then released in 1994, producing six singles, including "Nautical Disaster" and "Grace, Too". Trouble at the Henhouse followed in 1996, producing five singles starting with "Ahead by a Century", which reached number one on the RPM Canadian singles chart on 24 June and became their most successful single in their home country. "Butts Wigglin", the fifth single from Henhouse, also appeared on the soundtrack to the Kids in the Hall movie Kids in the Hall: Brain Candy. The live album Live Between Us was recorded on the subsequent tour at Cobo Arena in Detroit, Michigan.

The band developed a unique sound and ethos, leaving behind its earlier blues influence. Downie's vocal style changed while the band experimented with song structures and chord progressions. Songs explored the themes of Canadian geography and history, water and land, all motifs that became heavily associated with the Hip. While Fully Completely began an exploration of deeper themes, many critics consider Day for Night to be the Hip's artistry most fully realized. The sound here is typically called "enigmatic" and "dark", while critic MacKenzie Wilson praises "the poignancy of Downie's minimalism."

On the follow-up tour for this album, the band made its only appearance on Saturday Night Live, on March 25, 1995, thanks in large part to the finagling of fellow Canadian and Kingston-area resident Dan Aykroyd, who appeared on the show just to introduce them. Aykroyd, who is a fan of the band, had personally lobbied SNL showrunner Lorne Michaels to book them as a musical guest. On the show, Gord Downie notably flubbed the start of the song "Grace, Too"—rather than the normal opening lyric, "He said I'm fabulously rich", Downie sang it as "He said I'm tragically hip". The band later attributed the error to their pre-show use of marijuana.

In July 1996, the Hip headlined Edenfest. The three-day concert took place at Mosport Park, in Bowmanville, Ontario, Canada, just a few months after the LP Trouble at the Henhouse was released. The concert sold over 70,000 tickets in total, and was attended by an estimated 20,000 additional people who gained access to the concert site after the outside security broke down.

=== 1998–2003 ===
In 1998, the band released their sixth full-length album, Phantom Power, which produced five singles. It won the 1999 Juno Awards for Best Rock Album and Best Album Design. A single from the album, "Bobcaygeon", won the Juno Award for Single of the Year in 2000. The album has been certified platinum three times over in Canada.

In February 1999, the Hip played the first concert at the brand new Air Canada Centre in Toronto, Ontario. In July 1999, the band was part of the lineup for the Woodstock '99 festival in Rome, New York. On the second day of three, they were the first band to take the stage. They were followed by Kid Rock.

Their next album, Music @ Work, was released in 2000. It won the 2001 Juno Award for Best Rock Album. The album featured back-up vocals from Julie Doiron on a number of tracks, and reached No. 1 on the Canadian Billboard Charts.

In 2002, In Violet Light, recorded by Hugh Padgham and Terry Manning at Compass Point Studios in the Bahamas, was released, along with three singles from the album. It became certified platinum in Canada. Later that year, the Hip made a cameo appearance in the Paul Gross film Men with Brooms, playing a curling team from their hometown of Kingston. Three of their songs appear in the film, and they backed Sarah Harmer on a fourth, the soundtrack's lead single, "Silver Roads".

On October 10, 2002, the Tragically Hip performed two songs, "It's a Good Life If You Don't Weaken" and "Poets", as part of a command performance for Queen Elizabeth II. In 2003, the band recorded a cover of "Black Day in July", a song about the 1967 12th Street Riot in Detroit, on Beautiful: A Tribute to Gordon Lightfoot.

=== 2004–2008 ===
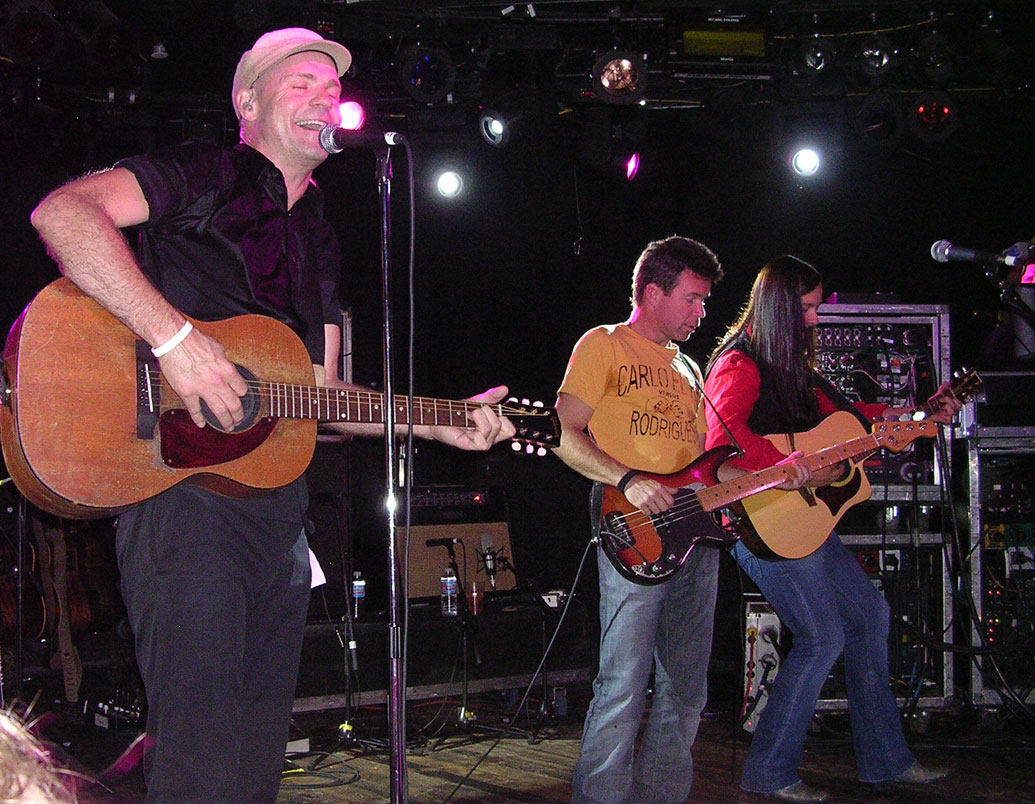
Left to right: Gord Downie, Gord Sinclair and Rob Baker performing in Aspen, Colorado, 2007

In Between Evolution was released in 2004 in the No. 1 position in Canada. It has since sold over 100,000 copies.

At the 92nd Grey Cup held November 21, 2004, the band provided the halftime entertainment in front of a packed house at Frank Clair Stadium in Ottawa.

In 2004, in episode 15 ("Rock On"), season 2 of Canadian comedy TV series Corner Gas, the Tragically Hip gave a cameo appearance as an unnamed local band rehearsing in Brent's garage. They play a rough version of the song "It Can't Be Nashville Every Night" from their In Between Evolution album until interrupted and asked to leave by Brent, Wanda, and Hank. As they disappointedly go, Wanda demands that Gord Sinclair and Rob Baker leave behind their amplifiers.

In October 2005, several radio stations temporarily stopped playing "New Orleans Is Sinking", out of sensitivity to the victims of Hurricane Katrina, which had devastated the city in early September of that year. However, it received considerable pirate radio and relief site play and gained some notoriety and praise in New Orleans due to its attitudinal proximity to the city's culture.

On November 1, 2005, the Hip released a double-CD, double-DVD box set, Hipeponymous, including all of their singles and music videos to date, a backstage documentary called "Macroscopic", an animated Hip-scored short film entitled "The Right Whale", two brand new songs ("No Threat" and "The New Maybe"), a full-length concert from November 2004 That Night in Toronto, and a 2-CD greatest hits collection Yer Favourites (selected on-line by 150,000 fans). On November 8, 2005, Yer Favourites and That Night in Toronto were released individually.

In 2006, another studio album, entitled World Container, was released, being notably produced by Bob Rock. It produced four singles, and reached the No. 1 spot on the Canadian rock music charts. The band toured concert dates in major Canadian cities, and then as an opening act for the Who on several US dates. A tour of Eastern Canada, Europe, and select cities in the United States occurred late in the year.

On February 23, 2008, the Hip returned to their hometown of Kingston, Ontario, where they were the first live act to perform at the new K-Rock Centre.

=== 2009–2015 ===
In 2009, the band again worked with producer Bob Rock, and We Are the Same was released in North America on April 7, 2009. It produced three singles. To promote We Are the Same, the band invited The Hour's George Stroumboulopoulos for a live interview at The Bathouse Recording Studio in Bath, Ontario (where most of the album was recorded), and they played seven new songs as well as unique versions of five other songs. The interview and performance were broadcast live in more than eighty theatres across Canada.

On January 22, 2010, the band performed "Fiddler's Green" at the "Canada for Haiti" telethon to aid earthquake victims in that country. This was broadcast nationally on all three of Canada's main networks (CBC, Global, and CTV).

Performing "The Wherewithal" at the House of Blues in Boston, Massachusetts, 2015.

Single "At Transformation" was released in May 2012 ahead of the band's twelfth studio album, Now for Plan A. A second single, "Streets Ahead" came out in August that year, and the album followed in October.

The Tragically Hip re-entered their studio in July 2014 to begin work on a new album. The following October, Fully Completely was re-released as a remastered deluxe edition, including two bonus tracks, a vinyl edition and a recording of a live show. To celebrate and promote the re-release, the band toured Canada and the United States from January to October 2015.

=== 2016–2017: Downie's diagnosis, summer tour, and death ===
In December 2015, Downie was diagnosed with glioblastoma, a terminal form of brain cancer. The band announced his diagnosis on May 24, 2016. The band also announced that, despite his condition, they would tour that summer.

The Hip's thirteenth album, Man Machine Poem, was released on June 17, 2016. The album featured songs such as "In a World Possessed by the Human Mind", "In Sarnia", and "Machine".

The final concert of the Man Machine Poem tour was held at the Rogers K-Rock Centre in the band's hometown of Kingston on August 20, 2016. The concert was aired by the Canadian Broadcasting Corporation as a live cross-platform broadcast on CBC Television, CBC Radio One, CBC Radio 2, CBC Music, and YouTube. The concert featured 30 songs and three encore sets, with the band finishing with a performance of "Ahead by a Century". The CBC's broadcast and live streaming of the concert, uninterrupted by advertisements, was watched by 11.7 million people (roughly one-third of the Canadian population).

On October 13, 2016, Downie gave an interview, his first since his cancer diagnosis, to the CBC's Peter Mansbridge, in which he reported experiencing memory loss. Downie also told Mansbridge that he was working with the Tragically Hip on new studio material, and that the band have up to four albums worth of unreleased material in the vaults.

Downie released his fifth solo album, Secret Path on October 18, 2016. The album is a concept album about Chanie Wenjack, a First Nations boy who escaped from a Canadian Indian residential school in 1966 and died while attempting to make the 600 km walk back to his home.

On December 22, 2016, Downie was selected as The Canadian Press' Canadian Newsmaker of the Year and was the first entertainer ever selected for the title.

On June 15, 2017, all five members of the Tragically Hip were announced as recipients of the Order of Canada by Governor General of Canada David Johnston. Downie received his honour on June 19; the other four members of the band were invested on November 17.

The band and the tour are the subjects of Jennifer Baichwal and Nicholas de Pencier's documentary film Long Time Running, which premiered at the 2017 Toronto International Film Festival. It was slated to have its television premiere in November 2017 on CTV, but following Downie's death the network moved the broadcast up to October 20.

Gord Downie died on October 17, 2017. His death was widely mourned throughout Canada. Prime Minister Justin Trudeau, who is a fan of the Tragically Hip, released a tribute statement on his official website the morning after Downie's death. Later in the day, he held a press conference at Parliament Hill at which he eulogized Downie as "Our buddy Gord, who loved this country with everything he had—and not just loved it in a nebulous, 'Oh, I love Canada' way. He loved every hidden corner, every story, every aspect of this country that he celebrated his whole life."

Following Downie's death, many of the band's albums climbed the Billboard Canadian Albums chart, which is compiled by Neilsen Music. In the week ending October 19, 2017 (the day following the announcement of Downie's death), Yer Favourites rose to No. 2 in the chart, with another 10 albums moving to the Top 200. Streaming also increased 700 percent, and many of the Tragically Hip's top hits remained on the Spotify Canadian Viral 50 as of October 23, 2017.

=== Since 2018: Activity following Downie's death ===
Before his death, Downie indicated in interviews that the band had unreleased material that may still be issued as one or more new albums; when accepting Downie's posthumous awards at the Juno Awards of 2018, his brothers Patrick and Mike also stated that more unreleased music is likely to be issued in the future.

A National Celebration, a concert film of the Tragically Hip's final concert, was released on DVD and Blu-ray on December 8, 2017.

In July 2018, guitarist Rob Baker told Entertainment Tonight Canada that the Tragically Hip were no longer active as a touring or recording entity following Downie's death. He stated "When I say The Tragically Hip doesn't exist as a performing unit anymore because a key member is gone, I think [fans] understand that. We wouldn't be The Hip without Gord [...] The Hip has played their last note."

Baker also revealed that Downie had encouraged the group to audition replacement vocalists, but the other members did not seriously consider the idea. With the legalization of marijuana in Canada, the remaining band members became investment partners in Newstrike, a cannabis company which has named several of its products after Tragically Hip songs.

In a July 2018 interview with the Toronto Sun, Baker confirmed that at least three albums' worth of unreleased material was recorded with Downie before his death, but stated that the band had yet to decide how it would be released.

On October 11, 2018, six days before the first anniversary of Downie's death, Fay and Baker joined Choir! Choir! Choir! at Yonge-Dundas Square (now Sankofa Square) for a live performance of the Tragically Hip's "Grace, Too".

On October 17, 2018, one year after Downie's death, a previously unreleased studio recording of the song "Wait So Long" was played on CIKR-FM, a radio station in the band's hometown of Kingston.

The Tragically Hip was among hundreds of artists whose material was reported to have been destroyed in the 2008 Universal fire but it later emerged that the band's master tapes had been transferred back to Canada in 2001, and had escaped the fire.

On September 14, 2019, Langlois, Sinclair and Baker performed a set at Rockin' the Big House, a benefit concert on the grounds of the former Kingston Penitentiary, with guest vocalists Hugh Dillon and Tom Cochrane.

In January 2020, Sinclair announced that his own debut album as a solo artist, Taxi Dancers, would be released on February 28.

In June 2020, the band and manager Jake Gold announced that they were undertaking an "archaeological dig" to select music and memorabilia from the band's archives for future release.

In early 2021, Rob Baker released a new album with his side band project, Stripper's Union.

The band released Saskadelphia, an EP comprising five previously unreleased and recently found Road Apples outtakes and a live track (as the original version has yet to be found). Road Apples was planned to be a double album, but was rejected by the label. Many songs were presumed to be destroyed in the Universal fire in 2008, but the masters were found and transferred to new recordings in 2019. Saskadelphia was released on May 21, 2021.

At the Juno Awards of 2021, the surviving members of the Tragically Hip performed their 2002 single "It's a Good Life If You Don't Weaken" with Feist on lead vocals, which marked the band's first televised performance since Downie's death, this performance would later be released in 2024 as a single. In a promotional interview on CBC Radio's Q before the ceremony, the band stated that they agreed to perform specifically because Feist had been proposed as the vocalist, with Langlois stating that "OK, so that's not going to be some guy trying to sing like Gord or some guy trying not to sing like Gord. It was a 'no' until Feist came up." The band also received the Juno Humanitarian Award at the ceremony for their history of philanthropic work in Canada. This performance was officially released as a single in December 2024.

In November 2021, the band released a 30th anniversary boxed set for Road Apples.

On June 24, 2022, the band released Live at the Roxy, a live recording of their May 3, 1991, concert at the Roxy Theatre in West Hollywood, California. In September 2022, the surviving members again reunited to perform at the Buffy Sainte-Marie tribute show Buffy Sainte-Marie: Starwalker, supporting singer-songwriter William Prince on Sainte-Marie's "Now That the Buffalo's Gone". In October 2022, the band continued their reissue campaign with an expanded box set for the 30th anniversary of Fully Completely.

In November 2023, the band released a 25th anniversary boxed set for their 1998 LP, Phantom Power.

In 2024, the band released a 40th anniversary boxed set of Up To Here. On September 20, 2024, the four-part documentary series, The Tragically Hip: No Dress Rehearsal, premiered on Prime Video. On the same day as The Tragically Hip: No Dress Rehearsal was released to streaming services, the previously unreleased song, "Wait So Long", an outtake from the Up To Here recording sessions, was released digitally on streaming platforms. In October 2024, the band released an anthology limited edition book, entitled This Is Our Life.

It's a Good Life If You Don't Weaken, a jukebox musical featuring the music of the Tragically Hip, premiered at the Theatre Aquarius in Hamilton, Ontario on April 22, 2026. In the same year, the band were inducted into the Canadian Songwriters Hall of Fame.The Tragically Hip: Live July 22 – August 20, 2016, a live album compiling performances from the Man Machine Poem Tour, was released on August 21, 2026. The release was promoted in part with a tenth-anniversary rebroadcast of the televised Kingston concert on August 22.

== Legacy and influence ==
The Tragically Hip's music is extremely popular in their native Canada, and Downie's songwriting has been praised for frequently touching upon uniquely Canadian subjects not otherwise covered by mainstream rock groups. In The National Post, Dave Kaufman wrote "Although Downie sings of Canada, his songs are by no means patriotic, or no more than in the way that we're all influenced by where we're from. The band have never been so obvious as to drape themselves in a Canadian flag, but instead, they evoke that shared experience of what it's meant for many of us to grow up in Canada." The band was a member of the Canadian charity Artists Against Racism and worked with them on radio PSAs. After Downie's death in 2017, Simon Vozick-Levinson of The New York Times wrote, "The place of honor that Mr. Downie occupies in Canada's national imagination has no parallel in the United States. Imagine Bruce Springsteen, Bob Dylan and Michael Stipe combined into one sensitive, oblique poet-philosopher, and you’re getting close."

According to Nielsen BDS, the Tragically Hip were the fourth best-selling Canadian musical artist in Canada between 1996 and 2016, behind only Céline Dion, Shania Twain and Michael Bublé. In that same period of time, "Ahead by a Century" was listed as the 67th most played song on Canadian radio across all formats, while 18 of their songs appeared in a list of the Top 150 most played songs on Canadian rock radio. Reflecting on the band's popularity in Canada, Rachel Sklar of Vox wrote, "There is a generation of Canadians who, if they went to university, they saw the Hip."

Despite their high popularity in Canada, the group was never able to cross over into the American rock music scene apart from a small, devoted fan-base centered in border cities like Buffalo, New York. The band notched four entries on the Billboard Mainstream Rock Tracks singles chart in the US; their highest-charting song on the chart being "Courage (for Hugh MacLennan)", which reached No. 16 in 1993. Downie once complained that the band's lack of crossover to the American rock music market had been overexamined, stating "[Interviewers] always ask us about our success or lack of success in the States, which I find absurd. While that is a story of the band, there are so many other stories." Comedian Rick Mercer remarked that much of the band's American fanbase was composed of Canadians living in the United States, and recalled an experience seeing them perform at The Fillmore in San Francisco where the venue was filled with Canadian fans; he wrote, "This was the curse of being the Hip, they would go to the Fillmore, a famous venue, and they would sell out in five minutes. But no Americans could get in. By the time they were like, 'What's this happening in this sold-out show with this insane band,' you couldn't get in because every Canadian filled up the space."

Numerous tribute and cover bands to the Tragically Hip have performed across Canada both before and after the band's dissolution. The band's music also provides the score for a full-length contemporary ballet, Jean Grand-Maitre's All of Us.

The band were named as an influence by several Canadian musicians and bands across multiple genres, including Dallas Green, k-os, and Kevin Drew. In 2021, India-born writer Lindsay Pereira wrote about how the band helped him understand Canada and Canadians better.

Downie's brother, documentary filmmaker Mike Downie, directed the four-part television documentary series The Tragically Hip: No Dress Rehearsal, which premiered in September 2024 at the Toronto International Film Festival and would later be released on Amazon Prime Video for streaming in Canada.

== Members ==
- Gord Downie – lead vocals, occasional guitar (1984–2017; his death)
- Rob Baker – lead guitar (1984–2017)
- Gord Sinclair – bass, backing vocals (1984–2017)
- Johnny Fay – drums, percussion (1984–2017)
- Davis Manning – saxophone (1984–1986; died 2023)
- Paul Langlois – rhythm guitar, backing vocals (1986–2017)

== Awards and honours ==
SOCAN Awards

- 1997: National Achievement Award

Canada's Walk of Fame:

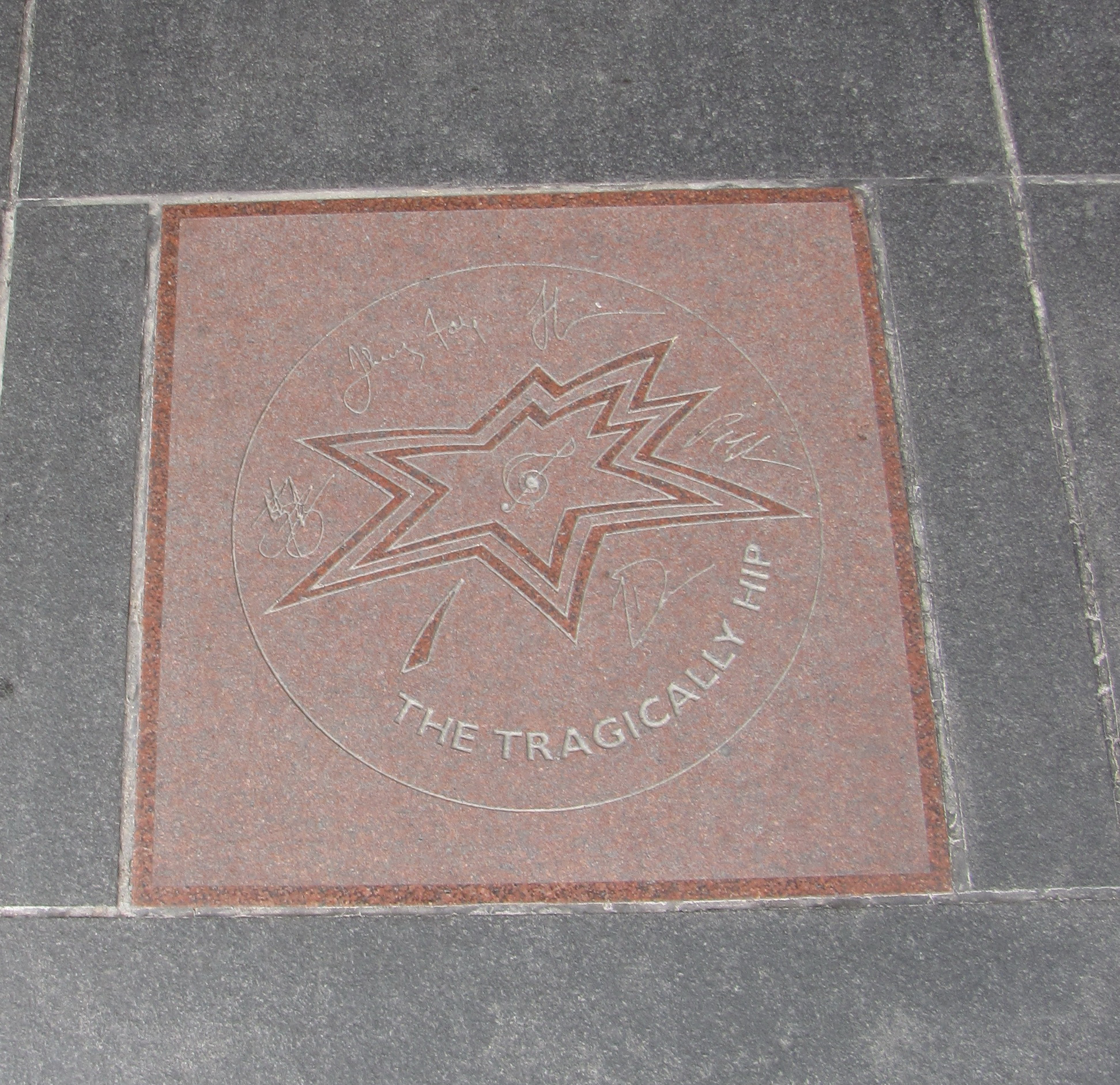
The Tragically Hip's star on Canada's Walk of Fame

- 2002: Inducted in Toronto, Ontario

Canadian Music Hall of Fame:

- 2005: Inducted at the Juno Awards in Winnipeg, Manitoba

Royal Conservatory of Music:

- 2006: Presented with an honorary fellowship May 24 at the Windsor Arms Hotel in Toronto, Ontario

Governor General's Performing Arts Awards:

- 2008: Presented the National Arts Centre Award in Ottawa, Ontario

Juno Awards

- 1990: Most Promising Group of the Year
- 1991: Canadian Entertainer of the Year
- 1993: Canadian Entertainer of the Year
- 1995: Entertainer of the Year
- 1995: Group of the Year
- 1997: Group of the Year
- 1997: Album of the Year (Trouble at the Henhouse),
- 1997: North Star Rock Album of the Year (Trouble at the Henhouse)
- 1999: Best Rock Album (Phantom Power)
- 1999: Best Album Design (Phantom Power)
- 2000: Best Single ("Bobcaygeon")
- 2001: Best Rock Album (Music at Work)
- 2006: CD/DVD Artwork Design of the Year (Hipeponymous)
- 2006: Music DVD of the Year (Hipeponymous)
- 2017: Rock Album of the Year (Man Machine Poem)
- 2017: Group of the Year
- 2021: Juno Humanitarian Award

Order of Canada

- 2017: Appointed to the Order of Canada

Homages:

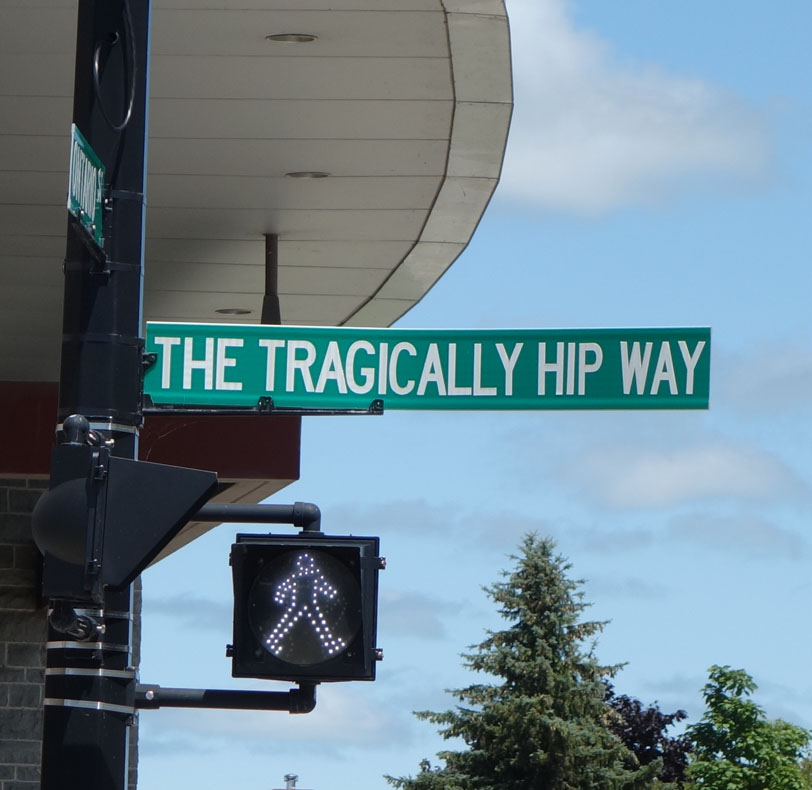
The Tragically Hip Way in Kingston

- In 2012, the city of Kingston, Ontario renamed a prominent portion of Barrack Street, in front of the K-Rock Centre, to "The Tragically Hip Way".
- In 2013, the Tragically Hip were one of four bands—alongside Rush, the Guess Who, and Beau Dommage—honoured by Canada Post in a series of postage stamps.
- On January 1, 2017, CBC Radio 2's The Strombo Show aired a special episode titled The Hip 30, which consisted of Canadian musicians performing live covers of the band's songs and sharing their thoughts on the band's impact on Canadian culture. Participating artists included Blue Rodeo, Sarah Harmer, Barenaked Ladies, Donovan Woods, Stars, Arkells and Rheostatics. The episode was already planned as a tribute to the band's 30th anniversary before Downie's cancer diagnosis was announced; several times during the show, host George Stroumboulopoulos reaffirmed that "this is not a eulogy; this is a celebration."
- On January 28, 2017, the Kingston Frontenacs of the Ontario Hockey League played against the Mississauga Steelheads in a special theme night game, in which the Frontenacs wore specially designed Tragically Hip sweaters. The band participated in the pregame show, in which the band members were presented with their own sweaters.
- On February 2, 2017, the City of Kingston unveiled a commemorative stone in Springer Market Square with Rob Baker and Paul Langlois, recognizing the last concert of the Man Machine Poem tour. Lyrics "Everybody was in it from miles around..." from Blow at High Dough were selected in an online poll with over 11,000 votes cast.
- On May 2, 2018, Alberta Ballet premiered All of Us, a full-length contemporary ballet featuring the music of the Tragically Hip. Discussions about the project began in early 2016 and had the support of all five band members. The ballet has since been performed in Calgary and Edmonton where Rob Baker attended in both cities on behalf of the band. In 2019 will tour to multiple Canadian cities.
- At the figure skating exhibition gala concluding the 2018 Winter Olympics, Canadian ice dancers Tessa Virtue and Scott Moir performed a tribute routine set to the Hip's "Long Time Running".

== Discography ==
- Up to Here (1989)
- Road Apples (1991)
- Fully Completely (1992)
- Day for Night (1994)
- Trouble at the Henhouse (1996)
- Phantom Power (1998)
- Music @ Work (2000)
- In Violet Light (2002)
- In Between Evolution (2004)
- World Container (2006)
- We Are the Same (2009)
- Now for Plan A (2012)
- Man Machine Poem (2016)

== See also ==
- Canadian rock
- Music of Canada
- List of Saturday Night Live hosts and musical guests
- List of diamond-certified albums in Canada
- List of Canadian musicians
- List of bands from Canada

Preceded by Bryan Adams	Grey Cup Halftime Show; 2004	Succeeded by The Black Eyed Peas
