= Bathouse Recording Studio =

Recording studio in Bath, Ontario, Canada

Coordinates: 44°10′24.6″N 76°47′21.0″W

- Industry: Recording studio
- Headquarters: Bath, Ontario, Canada
- Key people: The Tragically Hip

Bathouse Recording Studio is a recording facility located in Bath, Ontario, Canada. It is owned and operated by the Canadian rock band The Tragically Hip. Many influential albums have been recorded there by artists such as The Tragically Hip, Sam Roberts, Bruce Cockburn, the Hugh Dillon Redemption Choir, Blue Rodeo, Fred Eaglesmith, Sarah Harmer, Amanda Stott, The Trews, Andre Pettipas and The Giants, By Divine Right, Arkells, Stripper's Union, Half Moon Run, and Matthew Good.
