= Rob Baker (guitarist) =

Canadian guitarist (born 1962)

Rob Baker CM
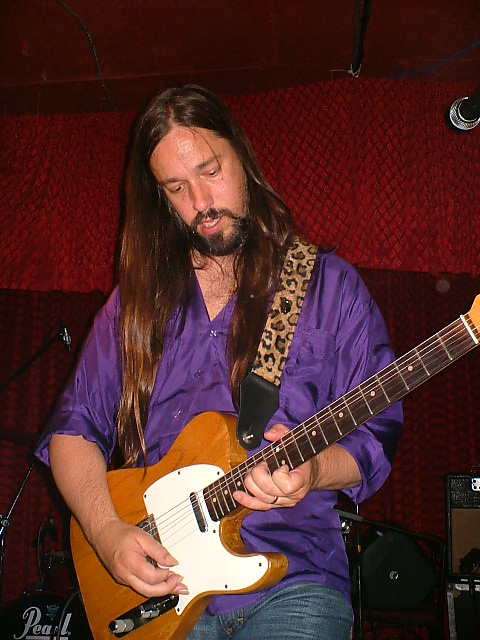
- Rob Baker performing with Stripper's Union, 2006

Background information
- Also known as: Bobby Baker
- Born: April 12, 1962 (age 64); Kingston, Ontario, Canada
- Genres: Rock
- Occupations: Musician, songwriter
- Instrument: Guitar
- Years active: 1983–present
- Formerly of: The Tragically Hip, Stripper's Union

Rob Baker CM (born April 12, 1962) is a Canadian guitarist, best known as the lead guitarist for the Canadian rock band The Tragically Hip. He has also released an album with the side project Stripper's Union in 2005.

== Life and career ==
Baker was born in Kingston, Ontario. He is the son of the late Judge P.E.D. Baker. Baker is a former student of Queen's University where he studied visual art. Until the Tragically Hip's fifth release, Day for Night, he was credited in the liner notes as Bobby Baker. Baker designed many of the Hip's T-shirts and album art.

He was inducted—as a member of the Tragically Hip—to the Canadian Music Hall of Fame in April 2005 at the Juno Awards in Winnipeg, Manitoba. He was also one of the winners of a 1999 Juno Award for Best Album Design, for The Tragically Hip release Phantom Power. On June 15, 2017, it was announced that Baker, along with the other members of The Tragically Hip, would be appointed to the Order of Canada for "their contribution to Canadian music and for their support of various social and environmental causes."

In one of his first musical projects since the end of the Tragically Hip, he played guitar on much of singer-songwriter Justin Rutledge's 2019 album Passages.

His son Boris Baker is a member of the rock band Kasador.

In 2023, Baker endorsed and co-chaired the campaign of his local MPP Ted Hsu in the Ontario Liberal Leadership race.

== Gear ==
Up until the mid-1990s, he used a 1970s burnt umber Fender Stratocaster, a thirteenth-birthday gift from his father, along with Mesa Boogie amplification and more recently Hamilton amplifiers. He now uses a variety of guitars such as Paul Reed Smith, Ernie Ball Music Man and Ovation Guitars, as well as a cream-coloured Fender Telecaster, and Garrison acoustics.

Baker uses these specific guitar models on stage:

- Garrison: G-41-CE and G-50-CE
- Ernie Ball Music Man: Silhouette Special
- Paul Reed Smith: Custom
- Rickenbacker: 360/12 JG
- Fender: early-1970s Stratocaster
- Fender: 1963 Telecaster and mid-1980s Telecaster Custom
- Fender: 1953 Lap Steel Double Neck (each neck has 8 strings: neck 1 has C6 tuning and neck 2 has E13 tuning)
- Reverend: Jetstream 390

His amplifier and effects are:

- Mesa Boogie Tremoverb
- Pedals: Line 6 DL4, Ibanez Tube Screamer, modulation, wah-wah
