= Dallas Good =

Canadian musician and singer–songwriter

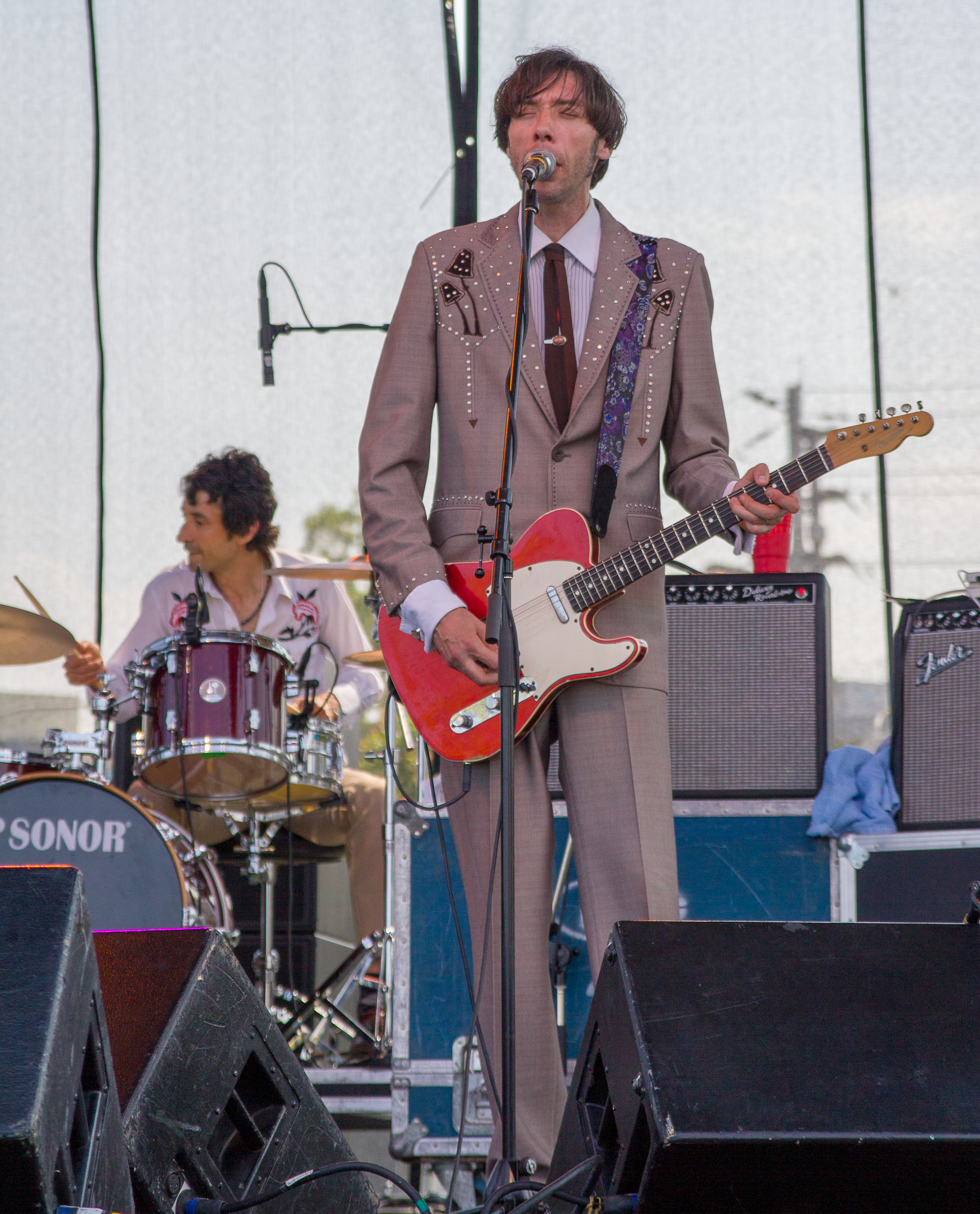
- Dallas Good performing with the Sadies in 2011

Background information
- Born: May 22, 1973; Richmond Hill, Ontario, Canada
- Died: February 17, 2022 (aged 48) Toronto, Ontario, Canada
- Genres: Indie rock
- Occupations: Musician, producer
- Instruments: Guitar, vocals

Dallas Good was a Canadian musician, songwriter, and record producer, best known as the co-founder, guitarist, and vocalist of the alt-country rock band The Sadies. Good was a pivotal figure in the Canadian music scene, contributing to a wide range of genres, including country, rock, punk, and psychedelic music.

== Early life ==
Good was born in Richmond Hill, Ontario, into a musical family. His father, Bruce Good, was a member of the Canadian country band The Good Brothers, which influenced Dallas's musical upbringing. Dallas, along with his brother Travis Good, grew up surrounded by music, which played a significant role in shaping his future career.

For a time, Good attended Toronto's Parkdale Collegiate Institute and spent his teenager years playing in a series of punk bands in and around Toronto, including Blibber and the Rat Crushers. Leaving home at 17, Good moved in with Jeff Beardall of the punk band Guilt Parade.

Good soon joined that band and later, Beardall and Good formed popular Toronto indie band Satanatras, who found an audience in Toronto's Queen Street indie rock scene in the early 1990s.

== The Sadies ==
In 1994, Good co-founded The Sadies with bassist Sean Dean. The band grew to include Dallas's brother, Travis, on guitar and fiddle, and drummer Mike Belitsky. They released their first album in 1998 and quickly gained a reputation for their distinctive blend of alt-country, surf rock, and garage rock, becoming a staple in the North American indie music scene. The Sadies were known for their energetic live performances, intricate musicianship, and ability to seamlessly blend genres.

The band released numerous albums throughout their career, earning critical acclaim and a dedicated fanbase. Some of their most notable albums include Favourite Colours, New Seasons, and Darker Circles, the latter of which was shortlisted for the Polaris Music Prize.

In February 2011, before a show in Saskatoon, Good slipped on ice and broke both his tibia and fibula, an injury requiring surgery. The other members of the Sadies played the Saskatoon show without Good and the rest of the tour was postponed while he recovered. During this period, Good worked on a Sadies collaboration with Gord Downie. Good was eventually able to continue with the Sadies tour wearing a cast and remaining seated. The title of the Sadies' next album, Internal Sounds, is a reference to the sound of Good's leg bones breaking, and the album cover features an X-ray of his injury.

== Collaborations and side projects ==
Good was a member of several other bands outside his time with the Sadies. This includes Phono-Comb, a band he joined in the mid 1990s playing alongside members of Shadowy Men on a Shadowy Planet, Half Japanese and Fifth Colummn. Good also joined Shadowy Men on a Shadowy Planet when the band decided to reunite in 2012, replacing the late Reid Diamond.

Good had a deep friendship and musical connection with Rick White, formerly of Eric's Trip. White lived with Good during the early 2000s after moving from Moncton to Toronto. Good also played with White in his band Elevator. Good and White were also members of The Unintended, a band that also featured Good's three bandmates from the Sadies (Travis Good, Sean Dean and Mike Belitsky) plus Greg Keelor of Blue Rodeo. The Unintended released a set-titled album in 2004 and the Constantines Play Young / Unintended Play Lightfoot split album in 2005. The latter featured the Unintended playing four Gordon Lightfoot covers and Constantines playing four Neil Young covers.

Good was also known for his extensive collaborations with other artists across various genres during his time in the Sadies. He worked with notable musicians and bands such as Neil Young, Buffy Sainte-Marie, Gord Downie, Garth Hudson, Kurt Vile, Neko Case, Andre Williams, Jad Fair, Jon Spencer, and John Doe.

Good also played and recorded with Toronto hardcore legends Career Suicide.

Shortly after Good's death in 2022, Richard Reed Parry of Arcade Fire announced via Instagram that he and Good had been working on an album on and off since 2008 with the working title The Watchtower. Unfinished at the time of Dallas Good's death, Parry plans to finish the album.

== Death and legacy ==
Good died unexpectedly on February 17, 2022, at the age of 48. In a statement from the Sadies' label Yep Record Records, it was stated that Good died of "natural causes while under doctor’s care for a coronary illness."

His death was a significant loss to the Canadian music community and to his fans worldwide. Many musicians paid tribute to Good on social media, including Patti Smith, Steve Albini, Robyn Hitchcock, Randy Bachman, and Ron Sexsmith plus members of Billy Talent, Barenaked Ladies, The Jayhawks, Arcade Fire, Blue Rodeo, and Junkhouse.

Colder Streams, the last Sadies album completed before Good's death, was released in July 2022. The band members undertook a concert tour to support it, performing most shows as a trio without a full-time replacement for Good, although Daniel Romano appeared at some shows as a guest guitarist.

In 2024, the band released their first new album recorded without Dallas Good, a collaboration with Rick White entitled Rick White and the Sadies. White had previously recorded his own album of Sadies covers, Rick White Plays the Sadies, in 2022 following Dallas Good's death.

In 2025, the Sadies and the Good Brothers collaborated on "Now That You're Gone", a tribute song to Dallas Good.

== See also ==
- Music of Canada
- Canadian rock
- List of Canadian musicians
