= Port Credit Secondary School =

Location
- 70 Mineola Road East; Mississauga, Ontario, L5G 2E5; Canada; 43.5629°N 79.5886°W

Information
- School type: Public, high school
- Motto: Lux Numquam Desit! (May the Light Never Fail!)
- Established: 1919; 107 years ago
- School board: Peel District School Board
- Superintendent: Darren Van Hooydonk
- Area trustee: John Marchant; Brad MacDonald; Joseph Stirling
- Principal: Danielle Noon
- Grades: 9^{th} – 12^{th}
- Enrolment: 1230
- Language: English
- Colours: Blue and Gold
- Nickname: Warriors
- Website: pcssonline.com
- Last updated: November 14, 2019

Port Credit Secondary School (PCSS) is a high school located in the city of Mississauga, Ontario, and is a part of the Peel District School Board. It was the first secondary school in Peel, celebrating its 100th anniversary in May 2019. It is located just north of Port Credit, Ontario. It is home to two Peel Region programs, the one of a kind SciTech Program and the Strings Program.

The current PCSS building is located about one block east of Hurontario Street at 70 Mineola Rd. East. The school is in the neighbourhood of Mineola, east of Hurontario Street, north of the CN Railroad and south of the Queen Elizabeth Way. The original location of the school was on Forest Avenue, on the site of what is now Mentor College. The school moved to its current location, May 13, 1963.

The school's athletic teams are known as the Warriors. The Ultimate Frisbee team won the regional championship during the 2009-2010 season. In 2011, PCSS Warriors became the first Ultimate ROPSSAA Champions, winning the finals 14-13. The Warriors won their second ultimate frisbee title in 2014 and finished the season with an undefeated record of 11-0. In 2022 the men's Lacrosse team went 5-0 and won their first ROPSSA championship.

PCSS was a shooting location for the 2006 film The Naked Mile. On October 20, 2007, the school was used as a filming location for the film True Confessions of a Hollywood Starlet.

== SciTech Program ==
PCSS Regional SciTech program, started in 2006, provides students with a physical learning in experience in science and technology. PCSS also has a Specialist High School Major program that provides student with real world experience. PCSS has workshops containing CNC machines and a 3D printer.

=== Robotics and Manufacturing Team ===
The Port Credit robotics and manufacturing team has taken part in many robotics competitions. The team was started in 2009 and placed 4th place overall at Skills Ontario. Since then, the team has taken part in the VEX, FIRST Robotics Competition, and Skills Canada robotics competitions.

Port Credit also integrates robotics and manufacturing into the curriculum as part of the SciTech regional program by providing robotics units in the Grade 10 manufacturing class, Grade 11 Computer Engineering Class, and Grade 12 Computer Engineering Class. In these classes, students learn machining techniques and CAD modelling software such as SolidEdge, along with some Arduino and EasyC programming.

== Regional Strings ==
Port Credit Secondary School is home to a Regional Strings program. Students do not need any previous strings training to be admitted. There are three levels of admission, beginner/intermediate/advanced. The program had its beginnings over a decade ago and has expanded year after year. Those in the program can major in violin, viola, cello and double bass.

== World War II ==
Port Credit Secondary School was one of the few schools that had to witness and partake in the war efforts of World War II. During World War II, Port Credit experienced a decline in enrolment due to the war and students having to enlist in the Canadian military. Around 26 teachers and students lost their lives in the war and never returned home. To this day, Port Credit Secondary School reads the names of these students and teachers every year on Remembrance Day.

== Notable alumni ==
• Michael Greziek/Shroud: Popular twitch streamer and former professional CSGO e-sports player. One of the largest Twitch streamers with 10 million followers, over 6.8 million YouTube subscribers and 917 million total YouTube views.

• Kyle Schmid: The talented Canadian actor is widely recognized for his impressive roles in various popular TV shows. Some of his notable performances include Alex Caulder in History's Six, Henry Durham in Syfy's Being Human, Robert Morehouse in BBC America's Copper, and Aaron Abbot in The Covenant (2006). He also played the role of Moses in the Netflix science fiction miniseries The I-Land. Recently, he appeared in ABC's television drama Big Sky, where he had a recurring role in 2021. (PCSS Alumni, Class of 2003).

• Jill Barber: Canadian artist known for her award-winning music. She won the Female Artist Recording of the Year award for her debut album "Oh Heart" at the 2005 Music Nova Scotia Awards. In 2007, she received the Best Local Solo Artist (Female) and Best Canadian Solo Artist (Female) awards in The Coast's "Best of Music Reader's Poll." Barber's album "Chances" earned her two Juno Award nominations and was featured on the TV series "Orange Is the New Black." She also won the SiriusXM 2012 Jazz Artist of the Year award and the 2013 Western Canadian Francophone Album of the Year for "Chansons." Barber's album "The Family Album" won a Juno Award for Contemporary Roots Album of the Year in 2017. Her recent releases include "Metaphora" (2018), "Entre nous" (2020), and "Homemaker" (2023). (PCSS Alumni, Class of 1998).

== See also ==
- List of high schools in Ontario
