= The Grand Bounce =

Studio album by Gord Downie and the Country of Miracles
- Released: 8 June 2010
- Recorded: August 2009
- Genre: Alternative rock
- Length: 49:57
- Label: Universal Music Canada
- Producer: Chris Walla

Gord Downie chronology
Battle of the Nudes (2003)	The Grand Bounce (2010)	And the Conquering Sun (2014)

Professional ratings
Review scores
Source	Rating
CHARTattack	4/5 stars
PopMatters	8/10 stars

The Grand Bounce is the third solo album by Gord Downie, the lead singer of The Tragically Hip. It was released on 8 June 2010.

== Background ==
Downie's backing band, "The Country of Miracles", is composed of established Canadian musicians Julie Doiron (vocals, guitar, bass), Josh Finlayson (bass, guitar), Dale Morningstar (lead guitar), Dave Clark (drums), and Dr. Pee (keyboards). The Country of Miracles also known as The Dinner is Ruined have worked with Downie on his previous two solo releases, Coke Machine Glow and Battle of the Nudes. The Country of Miracles provided support to Downie as his backing band during his subsequent tours.

The Grand Bounce was produced by Chris Walla, a guitarist for the band Death Cab for Cutie. Downie had met Walla during the Pemberton Festival in 2008 when Walla encountered Downie backstage. The album was recorded over a span of two weeks at The Tragically Hip's recording studio, the Bathouse, located in Kingston, Ontario, the home town of the band.

The album takes its title from Son of the Morning Star by Evan S. Connell, a book which Downie was reading. While reading the book, Downie came across the phrase "the grand bounce" referring to desertion, which he later used as the title to the album.

The painting on the cover of the album, titled Mohr for the late painter Ingeborg Mohr, was painted by Downie. He painted it for the Creative Arts Jem Auction, located in Toronto.

== Track information ==
The seventh track of the album, "The Drowning Machine", was incorporated into the 2011 album 20 Odd Years by fellow Canadian artist Buck 65. The song "Whispers of the Waves" uses various lines from "The Drowning Machine". Gord Downie served as a guest vocalist on Buck 65's release.

The song "Night Is for Getting" was originally released in 2004 as a bonus track to The Tragically Hip's album In Between Evolution. The lyrics were heard throughout the In Violet Light tour, as Downie has a tendency to incorporate unreleased lyrics into his live performances. The 2004 release contained a heavier arrangement than the Grand Bounce release due to the incorporation of more distorted musical components. The Grand Bounce version was generally more acoustic and keyboard based, which is similar to Downie's previous solo work. Downie was joined by a female vocalist, who provided backing vocals throughout the song and during the chorus.

The closing track "Pinned" contains various noticeable background chatter and noises. Downie recorded the vocal track while on a VIA rail train. The track was recorded on GarageBand and the microphone picked up different noises in the area. This included the train's whistle, which is heard multiple times throughout the song, and a conversation which is heard towards the end of the song.

== Reception ==
Ross Langager of PopMatters gave the album an 8/10 and stated that it "retains the indie rock-poet aesthetic of its predecessors while splicing in a measure of arena-sized muscle borrowed from his daytime gig". Aaron Brophy of ChartAttack gave the album a rating of 4/5. Brophy stated that "The hash-hazed sonic adventuring of the old records has been effectively compartmentalized in favour of a more zen approach and the end result is some of the best songs in the Downie canon". Ben Rayner of the Toronto Star described the album as "the work of an artist still driven to advance his art" and "the work of an artist having fun".

The Grand Bounce was listed as a Top 10 Canadian album of the year by CBC Radio 2.

== Track listing ==
All tracks are written by Gord Downie.

No.	Title	Length
1.	"The East Wind"	4.29
2.	"Moon Over Glenora"	3.10
3.	"As a Mover"	4.16
4.	"The Dance and Its Disappearance"	3.49
5.	"The Hard Canadian"	3.29
6.	"Gone"	3.53
7.	"The Drowning Machine"	3.26
8.	"Yellow Days"	3.56
9.	"Night is for Getting"	2.38
10.	"Moonslow Yer Lashes"	3.11
11.	"Retrace"	3.46
12.	"Broadcast"	5.12
13.	"Pinned"	4.42

== Charts ==
Chart performance of The Grand Bounce
Chart (2010)	Peak position
Canadian Albums (Billboard)	8
