= Battle of the Nudes =

Battle of the Nudes may refer to:

- Battle of the Nudes (engraving), a 15th-century artwork by the Italian artist Antonio del Pollaiuolo
- Battle of the Nudes (album), a 2003 album by the Canadian musician Gordon Downie
