= Port Credit (disambiguation) =

Port Credit may refer to:

- Port Credit, Ontario, a community in the city of Mississauga, Ontario, Canada
- Port Credit GO Station, a station in the GO Transit network located in the community
- Port Credit Secondary School, in the Canadian community
