= Isabelle Racicot =

Canadian television and radio host (born 1972)

Isabelle Racicot (born March 9, 1972) is a Canadian television and radio host.

== Early years ==
Racicot was born in Montreal, Quebec to a Haitian father and a French Canadian mother. She was adopted by French Canadian parents and grew up with three brothers. In 1995 she graduated from Concordia University with a BA in Communication Studies.

== Career ==
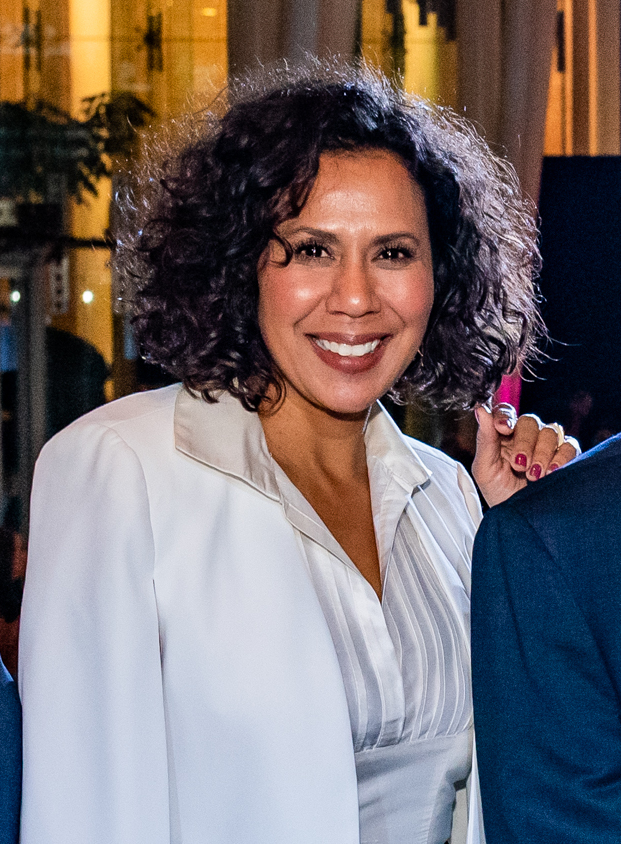
Isabelle Racicot

Racicot began her career in 1997 as a researcher at MusiquePlus (Quebec Canada's MTV) and quickly moved to a position in front of the camera. Between 1999 and 2006, she traveled the globe interviewing stars for the Canadian daily entertainment program, 'Flash and covering the Academy Awards, Cannes Film Festival, Toronto International Film Festival, Sundance Film Festival, the Grammy Awards and the People's Choice Awards. She has interviewed stars such as Sir Paul McCartney, Tom Cruise, Julia Roberts, and John Travolta.

Racicot is bilingual, and has worked as a contributor to English television in Quebec between 2002 and 2004 for the CBC and CBC Newsworld. She was also the host of a French interior design show Des Idées de Grandeur on Women's Network Canal Vie from August 2007 to October 2010.

Racicot has hosted two shows on Canada's number one French television network TVA. From 2000 to 2012 she was with the morning talk show Deux Filles Le Matin, which remains the number one morning show, covering family, human interest subjects, kids, and music. On Friday nights she hosts the number one talk show Ça Finit Bien La Semaine where Canadian and international personalities sit down with her for one-on-one in-depth interviews.

On August 25, 2012, Racicot joined CJFM-FM as a host.

== Awards and charity ==
Racicot has been named "Female Personality of the Year" at the Sounds of Blackness Awards in Quebec three times in 2008, 2009, and 2010. She also won the anglophone radio personality award at the Dynastie Gala.

Racicot is the spokesperson for the Girls Action Foundation whose goal is to help young women develop confidence and leadership skills.

== Magazine covers ==
Racicot has been featured on the cover of several French Canadian magazines:

- Vita, May 2010
- Souché, September 2010
- Moi & Cie, Holiday 2012
- Guide Beauté, August
- Le Lundi, March 2012
- Mieux-Être, April 2011
