= The Dinner Is Ruined =

Canadian indie rock band

- Origin: Canada
- Genre: Indie rock
- Years active: 1991–present
- Members: Dale Morningstar; Dave Clark; Dr. Johnny Pee
- Past members: Don Kerr; Al Kelso; Jim Field

The Dinner Is Ruined is a Canadian indie rock band. the band plays an experimental and improvisational brand of blues rock. The band members are Dale Morningstar, Dave Clark and Dr. Johnny Pee.

== History ==
The Dinner Is Ruined was formed in 1991 by multi-instrumentalist Dale Morningstar. Original members included Don Kerr on drums and Al Kelso on bass. They recorded their first album, Burn Your Dashiki, in 1991. After this point, Kelso left the band. Keyboardist and bassist Dr. Pee joined the group, and a second album, Love Songs from the Lubritorium, was recorded in 1993 by Raw Energy, Kerr left the band after this.

While opening for the band Rheostatics in 1994, Morningstar and Pee were booed and had objects thrown at them. Subsequently, Clark, at the time a member of Rheostatics, joined The Dinner is Ruined.

In 2000, the group released the album A Maggot in their Heads. The band continued to perform live, with often improvised instrumentation quite different from their recorded work.

In 2001, the band performed live at the Folk on the Rocks Festival in Yellowknife, backing up Gord Downie. This collaboration continued, and the members of The Dinner Is Ruined recorded as part of Gordon Downie's backup band on his three solo albums. Downie's band also included Julie Doiron and Skydiggers guitarist Josh Finlayson.

In 2014, The Dinner is Ruined backed up singer Kyp Harness on his album Armageddon Blues.

== Discography ==
=== The Dinner Is Ruined ===
- Burn Your Dashiki (1991)
- Love Songs from the Lubritorium (1993)
- Worm Pickers Brawl (1994)
- Ice Cream, Drugs, Rubber Goods (1996)
- Elevator Music for Non-Claustrophobic People (1997)
- A Maggot in Their Heads (1999)
- Ray Charles Kinda Party (2001)
- Legion Hall (2005)

=== Gordon Downie ===
- Coke Machine Glow (2001, as members of The Goddamned Band)
- Battle of the Nudes (2003, as members of The Country of Miracles)
- The Grand Bounce (2010, as members of The Country of Miracles)

== See also ==
- Music of Canada
- Canadian rock
- List of Canadian musicians
- List of bands from Canada
- Category:Canadian musical groups
