= Secret Path =

Studio album by Gord Downie
- Released: October 18, 2016
- Recorded: November 3–10, 2013; November 27–December 2, 2013
- Studios: The Bathouse Recording Studio, Bath, ON, Canada,
- Length: 41:10
- Label: Arts & Crafts Productions
- Producers: Kevin Drew, Dave Hamelin

Gord Downie chronology
And the Conquering Sun (2014)	Secret Path (2016)	Introduce Yerself (2017)

Professional ratings
Review scores
Source	Rating
Pitchfork Media	(8.0/10)

Secret Path is a Canadian multimedia storytelling project including a ten-song music album, a graphic novel, an animated television film, and instructional materials. Released on October 18, 2016, the centrepiece of the project is a concept album about Chanie Wenjack, a young Anishinaabe boy from the Marten Falls First Nation who died in 1966 while trying to return home after escaping from an Indian residential school.

The album Secret Path was the fifth studio album by Gord Downie and the final album released during his lifetime. The album was accompanied by a graphic novel of the same name, written by Downie, illustrated by Jeff Lemire, and published by Simon & Schuster; as well as an animated television film aired on CBC Television on October 23, 2016. All proceeds from the album and book are being donated to the University of Manitoba's National Centre for Truth and Reconciliation.

Downie performed the album in a concert at Roy Thomson Hall on October 21, 2016. The concert was aired by CBC Television in October 2017 following Downie's death. The project was further followed in 2018 by Finding the Secret Path, a documentary film by Downie's brother Mike Downie about the creation of the original project.

== Album ==
The centrepiece of the project is Secret Path, Downie's fifth studio album and the final album released during his lifetime. All proceeds from the album are being donated to the University of Manitoba's National Centre for Truth and Reconciliation.

=== Track listing ===
All tracks written by Gord Downie unless otherwise noted.

No.	Title	Length
1.	"The Stranger"	5:33
2.	"Swing Set"	3:20
3.	"Seven Matches"	3:31
4.	"I Will Not Be Struck"	4:02
5.	"Son"	3:17
6.	"Secret Path" (Downie, Kevin Drew)	4:12
7.	"Don't Let This Touch You" (Downie, Drew)	5:05
8.	"Haunt Them, Haunt Them, Haunt Them" (Downie, Drew)	5:02
9.	"The Only Place to Be"	2:55
10.	"Here, Here and Here" (Downie, Drew)	4:13

=== Personnel ===
- Vocals, Acoustic and Electric Guitars by Gord Downie
- Charles Spearin – Bass (4, 7, 8)
- Ohad Benchetrit – Lap Steel (5), Additional Guitar (7, 8)
- Kevin Hearn – Additional Keys (7)
- Dave "Billy Ray" Koster – Drums (10)
- All other instrumentation by Kevin Drew and Dave Hamelin
- Produced and Mixed by Kevin Drew and Dave Hamelin

Additional personnel:

- Engineered by Nyles Spencer
- Mastered by Eric Boulanger, The Bakery, Culver City, California, USA

== Live performances ==
Downie performed the album in a concert at Roy Thomson Hall on October 21, 2016, attended by members of the Wenjack family. The concert was filmed for an hour-long special, Gord Downie's Secret Path in Concert, which also featured backstage footage and scenes from the animated film. Downie and his collaborators performed the album, again with members of the Wenjack family, in Halifax's Rebecca Cohn Auditorium on November 29, 2016. This proved to be Downie's last performance. The special aired on October 22, 2017, on CBC Television, following Downie's death earlier that week.

== Book ==
Secret Path
- Author: Gord Downie
- Illustrator: Jeff Lemire
- Publisher: Simon & Schuster
- Publication date: October 18, 2016
- Media type: Paperback
- Pages: 96
- ISBN: 9781501155949

The graphic novel, also titled Secret Path, was written by Gord Downie, illustrated by Jeff Lemire, and published by Simon & Schuster. It was released on October 18, 2016, concurrently with the album.

As with the album itself, all proceeds from the book are being donated to the University of Manitoba's National Centre for Truth and Reconciliation.

== Film ==
The animated film, also titled The Secret Path, adapts Downie's album and Lemire's graphic novel. It is divided into ten chapters, according to the ten songs from Downie's album.

It was executive produced by Gord Downie, along with Mike Downie, Patrick Downie, and Sarah Polley. The film was produced with the participation of the Canada Media Fund and the Canadian Film or Video Production tax credit.

The Secret Path was broadcast by CBC in an hour-long television special on October 23, 2016.

== Reception and impact ==
The project was widely adopted by many Canadian schools as a teaching tool in indigenous history lessons on the residential school system, and led to the creation of the Gord Downie & Chanie Wenjack Fund to support efforts in indigenous reconciliation.

In an opinion piece in the National Post, Peter Shawn Taylor has criticized the story for containing fictionalized elements.

=== Charts ===
Chart (2016)	Peak position
Canadian Albums (Billboard)	4

=== Awards ===
The album won two Juno Awards at the Juno Awards of 2017, for Adult Alternative Album of the Year and Recording Package of the Year, and Downie won Songwriter of the Year for the songs "The Stranger", "The Only Place to Be" and "Son". The album was also a shortlisted nominee for the 2017 Polaris Music Prize.

At the 6th Canadian Screen Awards, the television film received nominations for the Donald Brittain Award and Best Music in a Non-Fiction Program. It won the Best Music award at the non-fiction programming event on March 6, 2017, and the Donald Brittain Award at the broadcast gala on March 11.

At the 7th Canadian Screen Awards, the concert special won two awards, for best variety or entertainment special and best sound in a non-fiction program.

At the 8th Canadian Screen Awards, Finding the Secret Path won the awards for Biography or Arts Documentary Program or Series and Best Direction in a Documentary Program (Mike Downie).
