= Favourite Colours =

Studio album by The Sadies
- Released: August 24, 2004
- Genre: Alternative country, country rock
- Length: 31:52
- Label: Outside Music
- Producer: The Sadies

The Sadies chronology
| Stories Often Told (2002) | Favourite Colours (2004) | In Concert Volume One (2006) |

Professional ratings
Aggregate scores
| Source | Rating |
|---|---|
| Metacritic | 87/100 |
Review scores
| Source | Rating |
| AllMusic | 4/5 stars |
| Mojo | 4.5/5 stars |
| NME | 8/10 |
| Now | 3/5 stars |
| Paste | 4/5 stars |
| Pitchfork | 7.2/10 |
| Uncut | 8/10 |

Favourite Colours is the fifth album by Canadian rock group The Sadies, excluding collaborations with other artists. It was released on August 24, 2004.

== Track listing ==
All tracks by The Sadies; except where noted.

1. "Northumberland West" – 2:20
2. "Translucent Sparrow" – 2:59
3. "1000 Cities Falling, Pt. 1" – 2:16
4. "Song of the Chief Musician, Pt. 2" – 2:10
5. "The Curdled Journey" – 2:53
6. "Why Be So Curious, Pt. 3" (The Sadies, Rick White) – 2:39
7. "The Iceberg" – 2:26
8. "A Good Flying Day" – 2:25
9. "Only You and Your Eyes" – 2:14
10. "As Much as Such" – 2:11
11. "A Burning Snowman" – 2:03
12. "Coming Back" – 2:12
13. "Why Would Anybody Live Here?" (Robyn Hitchcock, The Sadies) – 3:05

== Personnel ==
- Paul Aucoin – vibraphone
- Mike Belitsky – guitar, drums, vocals
- Paul Brainard – pedal steel, trumpet
- Joe Burns – cello
- Warren Butterfield – photography
- Joao Carvalho – mastering
- Chris Shreenan-Dyck – engineer, audio engineer
- Bruce Good – autoharp, vocals, voices
- Dallas Good – guitar, vocals
- Margaret Good – vocals, voices
- Travis Good – fiddle, guitar, vocals
- Robyn Hitchcock – vocals
- Greg Keelor – backing vocals
- Nick Luca – engineer, audio engineer
- Amanda Schenk – photography
- Craig Schumacher – mixing, audio engineer
