= Battle of the Nudes (album) =

Studio album by Gordon Downie
- Released: 3 June 2003
- Recorded: 2003
- Genre: Rock and roll
- Length: 37:00
- Label: Zoë Records
- Producer: Gord Downie & Dale Morningstar with Dave Clark & Josh Finlayson

Gordon Downie chronology
Coke Machine Glow (2001)	Battle of the Nudes (2003)	The Grand Bounce (2010)

Professional ratings
Review scores
Source	Rating
Allmusic	link

Battle of the Nudes is the second solo album by Gordon Downie, lead singer of The Tragically Hip. It was released in 2003. Most of the tracks are recordings of songs written by Downie with heavy rock accompaniment.

Downie's backing band, credited as "The Country of Miracles", included Julie Doiron, Josh Finlayson and members of The Dinner Is Ruined (Dale Morningstar and Dave Clark).

== Production and marketing ==
The album was recorded and mixed by Morningstar. The cover artwork was created by Montreal artist Jon Claytor.

To overcome the problem of fans creating bootleg recordings instead of buying the CD, Downie collaborated with MapleMusic Recordings to create video recordings of concerts performed in support of the album. The videos were posted for sale a few days after the concert.

== Track listing ==
All tracks written by Gord Downie unless otherwise noted.

1. "Into The Night"
2. "Figment"
3. "Christmastime In Toronto"
4. "Willow Logic"
5. "Pascal's Submarine" (Gordon Downie on harmonica and drums) (with the brass section and trumpet solo by Chris Botti)
6. "11th Fret"
7. "Who By Rote" (Downie, Clark, Doiron, Finlayson, Morningstar, Press)
8. "Steeplechase"
9. "More Me Less You"
10. "We're Hardcore" (Downie, Clark, Finlayson, Morningstar, Press)
11. "Pillform No. 2"
12. "Pillform No. 1"
