= Chansons (Jill Barber album) =

Studio album by Jill Barber
- Released: January 29, 2013
- Genre: Jazz/Pop
- Label: Outside Music
- Producer: Drew Jurecka

Jill Barber chronology
Mischievous Moon (2011)	Chansons (2013)

Chansons is an album by Canadian singer-songwriter Jill Barber, produced by Drew Jurecka, released January 29, 2013 on Outside Music. Her first album recorded entirely in French, for Chansons she selected and performed cover versions of songs by artists from Quebec and France, including Édith Piaf, Serge Gainsbourg, Henri Salvador, Raymond Berthiaume and Raymond Lévesque.

The album debuted at #1 on Canada's jazz sales charts, and at #11 on the Canadian Albums Chart.

== Track listing ==
1. "Petite Fleur" (Sidney Bechet/Fernand Bonifay/Mario Buo)
2. "J'attendrai" (Dino Oliviera/Louis Poterat)
3. "Mélancolie" (Wal-Berg/Louis Henneve)
4. "La Javanaise" (Serge Gainsbourg)
5. "Sous le ciel de Paris" (Hubert Giraud/Jean Dréjac)
6. "En septembre sous la pluie" (Jacques Larue/H. Warren/A. Dubin)
7. "Je cherche un homme" (Georges Pazman/Michel Emer/Yves Bruyère)
8. "N'oublie jamais" (Raymond Berthiaume/Roger Gravel)
9. "Quand les hommes vivront d'amour" (Raymond Lévesque)
10. "Les Feuilles mortes" (Joseph Kosma/Jacques Prévert)
11. "Plus bleu que tes yeux" (Charles Aznavour)
12. "Adieu foulards" (traditional)
