= Matthew Barber (singer-songwriter) =

Canadian singer-songwriter

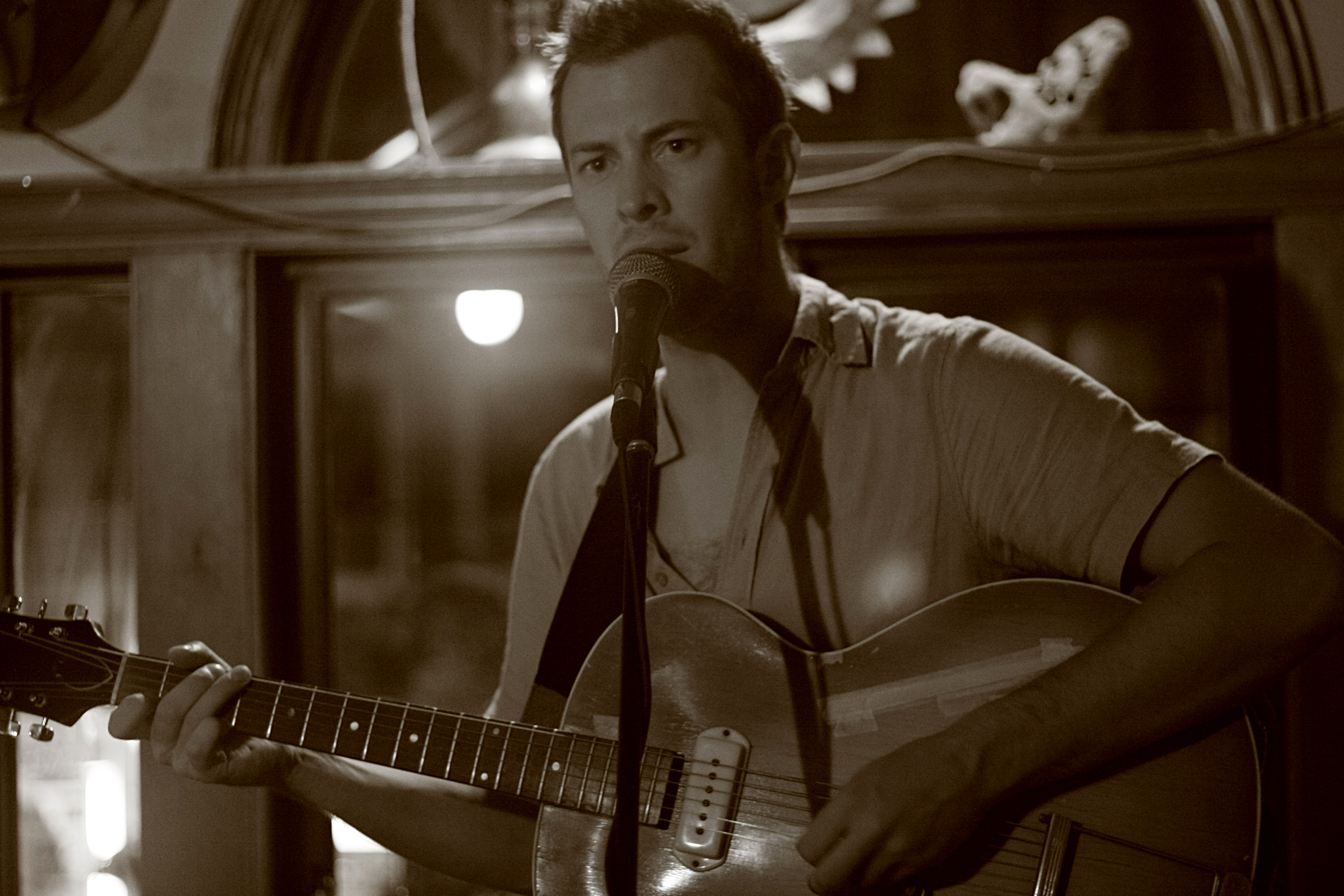

Background information
- Born: Matthew Elliott Barber; January 10, 1977 (age 49); Mississauga, Ontario, Canada
- Origin: Toronto, Ontario, Canada
- Genres: Indie pop Pop rock
- Occupation: Singer-songwriter
- Labels: Outside Music; Warner Music Canada
- Website: matthewbarber.com

Matthew Elliott Barber (born January 10, 1977) is a Canadian singer-songwriter. His music has been classified as indie pop and pop rock with folk and alternative country influences.

Barber was born and grew up in Port Credit, which is part of Mississauga, Ontario, just west of Toronto, attending Lorne Park Secondary School before moving to Kingston, Ontario to attend Queen's University, where he volunteered at campus radio station CFRC-FM and performed at campus pubs. While at Queen's, he released his debut album A Thousand Smiles An Hour... independently in 1999.

After graduating from Queen's, he went to McMaster University in Hamilton, Ontario for his master's degree in philosophy, and here he began to take his performing more seriously. Gaining support from the small but committed Hamilton music community, he released his breakthrough album Means and Ends independently in 2002.

The album soon caught the attention of Paper Bag Records, who re-released it to a wider audience in 2003. After two years in Hamilton, Barber moved to Toronto.

Barber has been a featured guest on >play, Go and Open Mike with Mike Bullard. He has toured extensively with artists including Buck 65, BOY, Joel Plaskett, Emm Gryner and Matt Mays and El Torpedo.

Barber's sister, Jill Barber, is also a noted Canadian musician.

== Career ==
Signed to Warner Music Canada, he released the EP title The Story of Your Life in 2004 and the full-length album Sweet Nothing on September 27, 2005.

Sweet Nothing's debut single and music video, "Soft One," became a major hit in Canada, reaching number one among most-added tracks and the top 20 tracks overall at hot adult contemporary radio in Canada, and receiving regular play on music video channels including MuchMusic, MuchMoreMusic and MusiMax.

On March 4, 2008, Barber released his fourth album on Outside Music, Ghost Notes. Numerous guest musicians are featured on the 10-track album, including Sarah Harmer and Barber's sister Jill. His fifth album, True Believer, was released on February 23, 2010. The self-titled album Matthew Barber was released June 7, 2011, on Outside Music. In the same year, Jill and Matthew Barber collaborated on a cover of The Hardship Post's "Your Sunshine", which appeared on the charity compilation album Have Not Been the Same – Vol. 1: Too Cool to Live, Too Smart to Die.

In 2014, he released Big Romance. Barber returned to work in 2018 with Phase of the Moon, his first solo LP in four years.

In 2025 Jill and Matthew Barber contributed a cover of Joel Plaskett's "Light of the Moon" to the Plaskett tribute album Songs from the Gang.

He has also produced two albums, Artefact (2022) and New Kind of Familiar (2024), for Clever Hopes.

== Discography ==
- A Thousand Smiles An Hour (1999)
- Means & Ends (2003)
- The Story of Your Life (2004) (EP) (Released as "Matthew Barber & The Union Dues")
- Sweet Nothing (2005)
- Ghost Notes (2008)
- Side Notes (2009) EP
- True Believer (2010)
- Matthew Barber (2011)
- Songs for the Haunted Hillbilly (2012)
- Big Romance (2014)
- The Family Album (2016), with Jill Barber
- Phase of the Moon (2018)
- No Singing or Dancing (2022) EP
- Find the Time (2026)
