= New Seasons (album) =

Studio album by The Sadies
- Released: October 2007
- Studios: The Watershed, Toronto
- Genre: Alternative country
- Labels: Outside Music; Yep Roc
- Producers: Gary Louris, The Sadies

The Sadies chronology
Tales of the Rat Fink (2006)	New Seasons (2007)	Country Club (2009)

Professional ratings
Review scores
Source	Rating
AllMusic	4/5 stars
PopMatters	6/10 stars

New Seasons is an album by Canadian alternative country band The Sadies. It was released in 2007 on Outside Music in Canada and Yep Roc in the United States.

The album was a longlisted nominee for the 2008 Polaris Music Prize, and a shortlisted nominee for Roots & Traditional Album of the Year - Group at the 2008 Juno Awards.

== Track listing ==
No.	Title	Length
1.	"Introduction"
2.	"The First Inquisition, Pt. IV"
3.	"What's Left Behind"
4.	"Sunset to Dawn"
5.	"Yours to Discover"
6.	"Anna Leigh"
7.	"The Trial"
8.	"My Heart of Wood"
9.	"A Simple Aspiration"
10.	"Wolf Tones"
11.	"Never Again"
12.	"The Land Between"
13.	"The Last Inquisition, Pt. V"
