= Folly and the Hunter =

Montreal Indie-Folk Band

Folly & the Hunter
- Origin: Montreal, Quebec, Canada
- Genres: Adult Alternative, indie-folk, Folk music
- Years active: 2008–2018
- Labels: Outside Music (Canada)
- Members: Nick Vallee, Christopher Fox, Laurie Torres, Phil Creamer
- Website: follyandthehunter.com

Folly & the Hunter are an indie-folk band from Montreal, founded by members Nick Vallée, Laurie Torres, and Christopher Fox with their 2011 self-released debut album Residents. The band recorded their second album with Jace Lasek of The Besnard Lakes at his Breakglass Studio in Montréal and signed to Canadian record label Outside Music to release Tragic Care on April 16, 2013. Tragic Care established the band's detailed hand at crafting "multidimensional folk", and garnered comparisons to Sigur Rós. Folly & the Hunter recorded their 2015 album Awake with Howie Beck at Toronto's Revolution Studios in Toronto and touring member Phil Creamer joined the band as a permanent member.

Folly & the Hunter have toured across Canada, U.S., and Europe, including performances at SXSW, opening for indie-rock band Half Moon Run and The Barr Brothers.

On November 16, 2018, the band announced that their album release concert for Remains on December 14, 2018, at Bar le Ritz PDB in Montreal would also be their farewell concert.

== Discography ==
=== Albums ===
- Residents (release date March 15, 2011)
- Tragic Care (release date April 16, 2013)
- Awake (release date May 26, 2015)
- Remains (release date October 26, 2018)
