= Away Is Mine =

Studio album by Gord Downie
- Released: October 16, 2020
- Recorded: July 17–21, 2017
- Studio: The Bathouse, Bath, Ontario
- Length: 52:14
- Label: Arts & Crafts
- Producer: Nyles Spencer

Gord Downie chronology
Introduce Yerself (2017)	Away Is Mine (2020)	Lustre Parfait (2023)

Away Is Mine is the seventh solo studio album by Gord Downie. It was released posthumously on October 16, 2020, and recorded over four days in July 2017, three months before he died. It is a double album, with one disc containing electric versions of the songs, and the other acoustic.

The album was produced by Nyles Spencer. It sold well in Canada, earning a #3 Billboard Canada chart debut with the #1 spot on the Top Albums, Vinyl, and Digital Albums charts.

Regarding the release, The Spill Magazine's John Graham laments, "Away Is Mine serves as a reminder that Downie, our dear friend gone far too soon, gave everything he could musically, before the inevitability of his death."

"There really wasn’t a plan to make a record," Downie’s co-writer Josh Finlayson said. "The whole thing was that I knew this was a great way to spend time with Gord, listening to music, talking about music, talking about things that we’d always talked about. And this just evolved pretty organically."

“This won’t be his last release, but these are the final ten songs Gord sang before he died. The last time he ever sang into a mic," Finlayson and brother Patrick Downie wrote in a joint statement. “That’s pretty special to us."

== Track listing ==
All tracks written by Gord Downie and Josh Finlayson.

Disc one
No.	Title	Length
1.	"Hotel Worth"	3:55
2.	"Useless Nights"	2:57
3.	"I Am Lost"	2:27
4.	"About Blank"	2:38
5.	"River Don't Care"	2:19
6.	"The Least Impossible"	2:34
7.	"Traffic Is Magic"	2:26
8.	"Away Is Mine"	2:23
9.	"No Solace"	2:18
10.	"Untitled"	3:42
Total length:		27:39

Disc two
No.	Title	Length
1.	"Hotel Worth" (Acoustic)	2:57
2.	"Useless Nights" (Acoustic)	2:29
3.	"I Am Lost" (Acoustic)	2:12
4.	"About Blank" (Acoustic)	2:06
5.	"River Don't Care" (Acoustic)	2:13
6.	"The Least Impossible" (Acoustic)	2:10
7.	"Traffic Is Magic" (Acoustic)	2:27
8.	"Away Is Mine" (Acoustic)	2:24
9.	"No Solace" (Acoustic)	1:58
10.	"Untitled" (Acoustic)	3:32
Total length:		24:28
