= Dale Morningstar =

Canadian rock musician

- Origin: Chippawa, Ontario, Canada
- Genres: Rock
- Occupation(s): Musician, recording engineer, producer
- Labels: Raw Energy, Sonic Unyon

Dale Morningstar is a Canadian rock musician and recording engineer and producer, originally from Chippawa, Ontario.

== Biography ==
Morningstar is the founding member of The Dinner Is Ruined, an avant-garde rock band based in Toronto in the early 1990s. The band is known for an unconventional approach to music, Morningstar once even playing the stationary bicycle live at Massey Hall.

Morningstar, however, is perhaps best known for co-founding The Gas Station Recording studio, which has been called "the hub of the Canadian indie rock sound" with Don Kerr in 1990. The studio started off in his basement apartment in an old Liberty Street warehouse (by King and Dufferin). They quickly outgrew the space and moved around the corner to 53 Fraser Avenue. After over 7 years at the Fraser Ave. location Morningstar received an eviction notice on March 30, 2000. He and other musicians, colleagues and friends staged a demonstration and circulated posters opposing the eviction. This brought the situation to the attention of ArtScape Toronto who offered them an old portable schoolhouse at their Gibraltar Point location (the former Toronto Island Public and Natural Science School), on the Toronto Islands, where the studio remains today.

Morningstar has provided record production, mixing, and engineering for countless musicians over the years including Gordon Downie, Julie Doiron, Neko Case, Thrush Hermit, Tristan Psionic, Cowboy Junkies, Yat-Kha, Barenaked Ladies, hHead, The Inbreds and Kyp Harness.

More recently, Morningstar was one of the contributing artists for the National Parks Project, recording an EP of atmospheric music in Prince Edward Island National Park with Sophie Trudeau of Godspeed You! Black Emperor and Chad Ross of The Deadly Snakes and Quest for Fire.

== Discography ==
=== Solo ===
- 2002: I Grew Up on Sodom Road (Sonic Unyon)

=== The Dinner Is Ruined ===
- 1991: Burn Your Dashiki (self-released)
- 1993: Love Songs from the Lubritorium (Raw Energy)
- 1994: Worm Pickers Brawl (Gas Rackett)
- 1996: Ice Cream, Drugs, Rubber Goods (Sonic Unyon)
- 1997: Elevator Music for Non-Claustrophobic People (Sonic Unyon)
- 1999: A Maggot in Their Heads (Sonic Unyon)
- 2001: Ray Charles Kinda Party (Sonic Unyon)
- 2005: Legion Hall (self-released)

=== Gordon Downie ===
- 2001: Coke Machine Glow (Zoë Records)
- 2003: Battle of the Nudes (Zoë Records)
- 2010: The Grand Bounce (Cobraside)

=== Various artists ===
- 2011: National Parks Project: Prince Edward Island - EP (Last Gang Records)
