= The Sadies =

Canadian rock and roll / country band

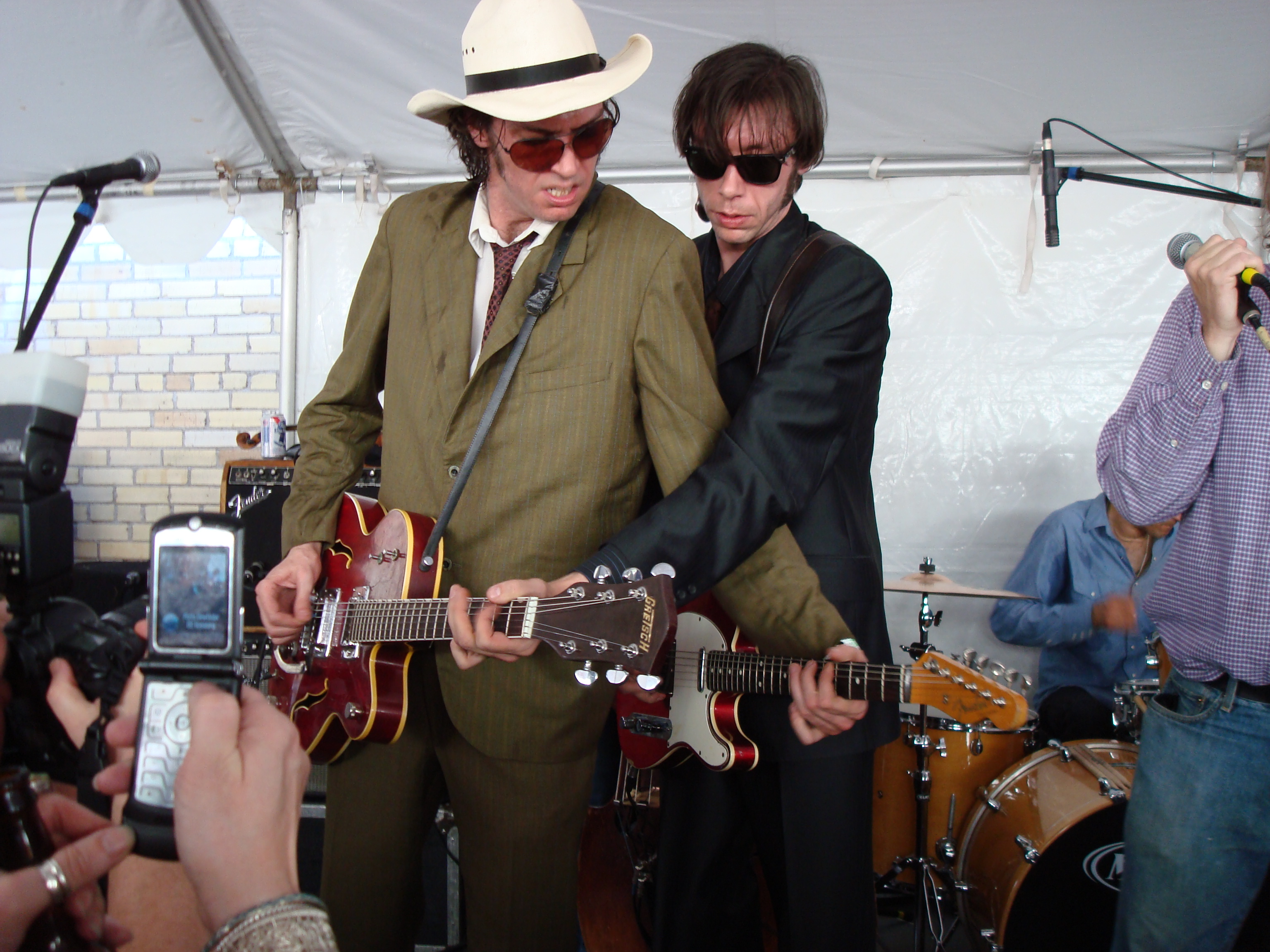
- Performing at South By Southwest 2008

Background information
- Origin: Toronto, Ontario, Canada
- Genres: Alternative country, country and western
- Years active: 1994–present
- Labels: Bloodshot, Yep Roc Records, Outside Music
- Members: Travis Good; Sean Dean; Mike Belitsky
- Past members: Dallas Good
- Website: thesadies.net

The Sadies are a Canadian rock and roll/country and western band from Toronto, Ontario. The band consists of Travis Good, Sean Dean and Mike Belitsky. Dallas Good, a founding member, died in 2022. Dallas and Travis are the sons of Margaret and Bruce Good, and nephews of Brian and Larry Good, who are members of the Canadian country group The Good Brothers.

== Background ==
In 1994, Dallas Good co-founded The Sadies as a two-piece with bassist Sean Dean. They were joined by a series of drummers: Ted Robinson, followed by Andrew Scott (later of Sloan), and finally Mike Belitsky. Eventually, Dallas's brother Travis Good joined on guitar and fiddle. In 1998, the group released their first album, Precious Moments. Several more albums followed, including In Concert Vol. 1 in 2006.

In addition to their own recordings, the Sadies often collaborate with other artists, such as Blue Rodeo, Jon Langford, Gord Downie, Andre Williams (on the 1999 country-influenced Red Dirt and the 2012 release entitled "Night and Day"), Neil Young (track "This Wheel’s on Fire" on the album Garth Hudson Presents a Canadian Celebration of The Band) and have recorded, written and toured extensively as the backing band for singer Neko Case. They have also toured and recorded with Jon Spencer and Matt Verta-Ray as Heavy Trash, as well as John Doe. They are considered honorary members of The Mekons. The 2005 documentary Come on Down: Searching for the American Dream features music by the Sadies. The Sadies' music is featured in many films and television shows, for example, Adult Swim's 12 oz. Mouse. An instrumental performed by the band can be heard in episode 5 of season 1, during a scene in which Rhoda the bartender is murdered. On 18 May 2010, the Sadies released Darker Circles CD/LP through Outside Music and Yep Roc Records. Darker Circles was a shortlisted nominee for the 2010 Polaris Music Prize and in 2012, won a Juno Award with Mike Roberts for best video.

The Sadies are collectively members of the group The Unintended, along with Greg Keelor of Blue Rodeo and Rick White of Eric's Trip/Elevator. They also make multiple contributions to Garth Hudson's 2010 album Garth Hudson Presents: A Canadian Celebration of The Band, by performing "The Shape I'm In", and also by backing Neil Young, for "This Wheel's On Fire", and Mary Margaret O'Hara, for "Out of the Blue". All performances on that album featured Hudson on keyboards. The Sadies have performed with other members of the Good Brothers intermittently over the years using the name "The Good Family", and in 2013 released the album The Good Family Album, as well as performing live under that name.

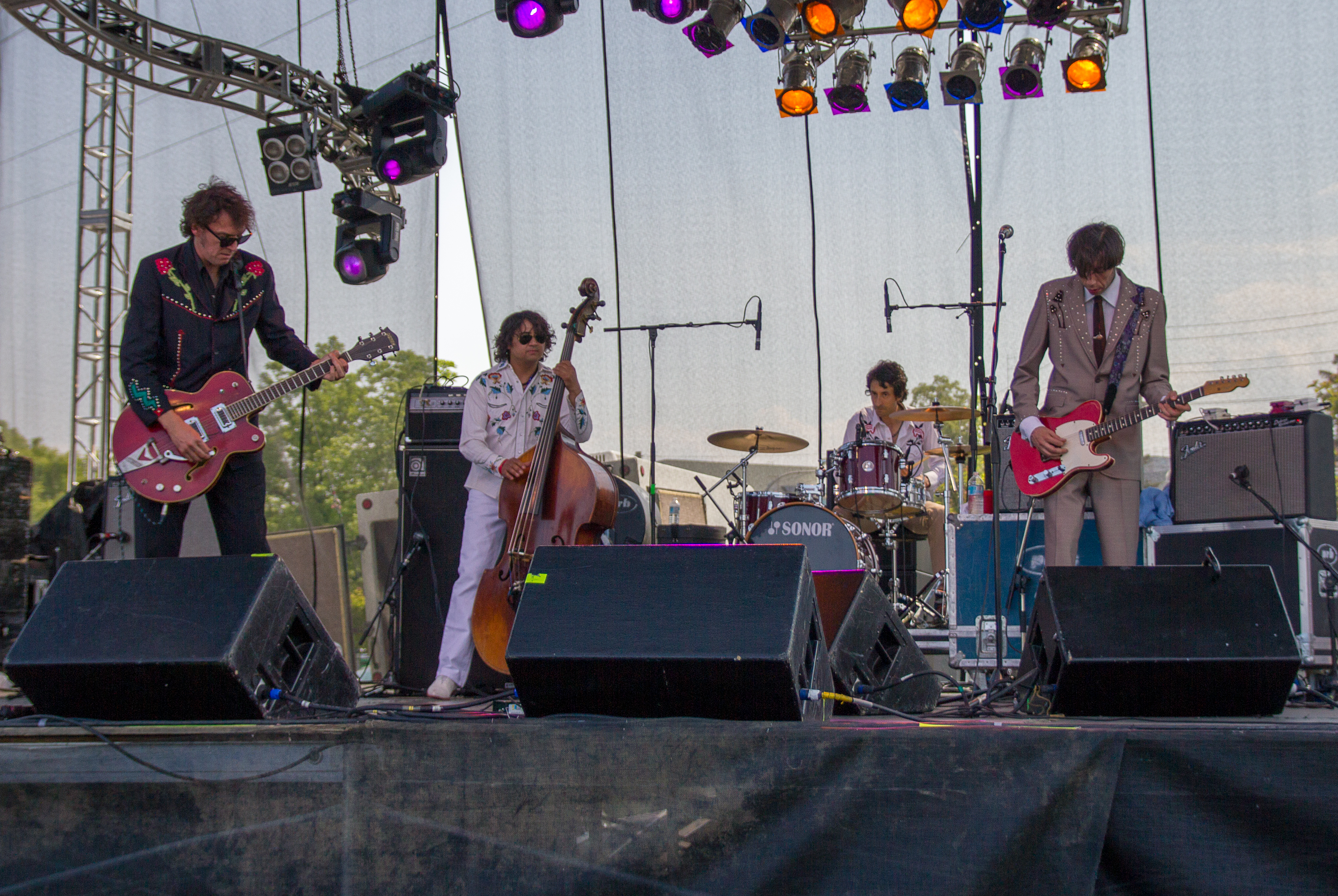
The Sadies performing at Burlington's Sound of Music Festival Festival in 2011

Among the band's last studio releases are Internal Sounds, released on 17 September 2013 through Outside Music; And the Conquering Sun, their 2014 collaboration with Gord Downie on Arts & Crafts Productions; and Northern Passages, released in February 2017 on Yep Roc Records.

Dallas Good died unexpectedly on February 17, 2022, at the age of 48. The cause was a recently detected heart condition. Colder Streams, the last Sadies album completed before his death, was released in July 2022, to critical acclaim. The album was the winner of the Juno Award for Adult Alternative Album of the Year at the Juno Awards of 2023, and was shortlisted for the 2023 Polaris Music Prize.

In 2024, the band released their first new album recorded without Dallas Good, a collaboration with Rick White entitled Rick White and the Sadies. The album was longlisted for the 2025 Polaris Music Prize. White, a longtime friend of the band's, had previously recorded his own album of Sadies covers, Rick White Plays the Sadies, in 2022 following Dallas Good's death.

In 2025, the band appeared on "Now That You're Gone", a tribute song to Dallas Good recorded by The Good Brothers.

Live at 6 O'Clock, compiling live performances from their 2014 tour with Gord Downie, was released in February 2026.

== Discography ==
=== Albums ===
Year	Album	Peak chart positions		
Year	Album	US Country	US Heat	US Indie
1998	Precious Moments	—	—	—
1999	Red Dirt (Andre Williams and The Sadies)	—	—	—
1999	Pure Diamond Gold	—	—	—
2001	Tremendous Efforts	—	—	—
2002	Stories Often Told	—	—	—
2003	Mayors of the Moon (Jon Langford & His Sadies)	—	—	—
2004	Favourite Colours	—	—	—
2004	The Tigers Have Spoken (Neko Case & The Sadies)	—	14	19
2006	In Concert Volume One	—	—	—
2006	Tales of the Rat Fink	—	—	—
2007	New Seasons	—	—	—
2008	S/T ([Jerry Teel & The Big City Stompers)	—	—	—
2009	Country Club (John Doe & The Sadies)	32	10	37
2010	Darker Circles	—	—	—
2012	Night and Day (Andre Williams and The Sadies)	—	—	—
2013	The Good Family Album (The Good Family including The Good Brothers and The Sadies)	—	—	—
2013	Internal Sounds	—	—	—
2014	And the Conquering Sun (with Gord Downie)	—	—	—
2017	Northern Passages	—	—	—
2022	Colder Streams	TBD	TBD	TBD
2024	Rick White and the Sadies	—	—	—
2026	Live at 6 O'Clock (with Gord Downie)	—	—	—
"—" denotes releases that did not chart

=== Singles ===
- cork & monkey/village of horseheads/the curdled journey (2001)
- "Crater" (with Gordon Downie) (2014)
- The Most Despicable Man Alive b/w Old Gunga Din (2020) Ernest Jenning Record Co.

== See also ==
- Music of Canada
