= Colder Streams =

Studio album by The Sadies
- Released: July 22, 2022
- Studios: Skybarn; Studio Cimetière
- Genres: Country rock, alternative country, psychedelic rock
- Length: 32:24
- Labels: Dine Alone Records; Yep Roc Records
- Producer: Richard Reed Parry

The Sadies chronology
Northern Passages (2017)	Colder Streams (2022)	Rick White and the Sadies (2024)

Colder Streams is the 11th studio album by Canadian alternative country band The Sadies, released July 22, 2022, on Dine Alone Records in Canada and Yep Roc Records in the United States. It was the last album recorded before the death of founding member Dallas Good in 2022.

The album was recorded principally at the Skybarn studio in Montreal by producer Richard Reed Parry, with the band largely recording their parts solo or in duos due to social distancing restrictions in place during the COVID-19 pandemic.

Several months before his death, Good had composed a new tongue-in-cheek "anti-biography" for the band's profile on Yep Roc's website, poking fun at the inflated public relations hype typical in music marketing by calling Colder Streams "by far, the best record that has ever been made by anyone. Ever."

== Tour ==
The album's release was accompanied by the announcement of a summer concert tour to support it. The initial tour dates had to be cancelled when drummer Mike Belitsky had to undergo emergency wrist surgery; however, the band did perform a single show which was recorded by documentary filmmaker Ron Mann for release as the concert film The Sadies Stop and Start.

Belitsky described the decision to tour by saying that "We've been together so long that when something shitty happens in our lives, we always had the band, a place to go and forget about what was bad and do something that was good. We all needed to hang out, and when we hang out we make music. And then we were like, 'Alright, we've got this record coming out that Dallas worked so hard at. What are we going to do, just put it out and let it flail around in the wind?' It was almost like we owed it to the honour of Dallas, and to ourselves, to see it through and go on tour and promote it, and that's what we're doing."

The band did ultimately proceed with a rescheduled concert tour beginning in December 2022. They performed the shows as a trio rather than with a full-time replacement for Dallas Good, although Daniel Romano did appear at some shows as a guest guitarist on selected numbers.

== Critical reception ==
Vish Khanna of Exclaim! gave the album a rare 10 out of 10 rating, writing that "No matter what comes next for the Sadies in the studio without Dallas Good, their legacy (and his) was secure before Colder Streams, but here's a record that punctuates and cements it. A flurry of emotion — joyful and pointed — and clattering noise blending into haunting sparseness, this is the record the Sadies have been working on capturing for their entire existence. Thankfully, and with bittersweet timing, they got it done when we most needed them to, making the best record that has ever been made by anyone. Ever."

Pat King of Paste rated it 8.5 out of 10, writing that "Upon listening to Colder Streams, one thing is made abundantly clear as soon as the needle hits the groove: This is far and away the best the band has ever sounded on record. If there ever was a prevailing issue that has plagued The Sadies, it's that their records have never been able to harness the electrifying interplay of their legendary live shows. That pesky rough edge has been buffed the fuck out on Colder Streams, as the production from Arcade Fire's Richard Reed Parry and mixing and engineering by Pietro Amato capture the band in all of their crackling live glory, with enough cavernous reverb and booming low end to make it feel like you're watching the band after stumbling into one of their gigs in a packed bar. It's almost alarming how this record feels both immaculate and voyeuristic at the same time, like on the fuzzed-out choruses of opener "Stop and Start" and the Travis-sung autumnal folk ballad "All The Good." You get a perfect sense of where each instrument sits in the mix, as if you are sitting dead center in their practice space, all while feeling like it is music being conjured in a hallucinatory state."

== Awards ==
The album won the Juno Award for Adult Alternative Album of the Year at the Juno Awards of 2023, and was shortlisted for the 2023 Polaris Music Prize.

== Track listing ==
No.	Title	Length
1.	"Stop and Start"	3:06
2.	"Message to Belial"	3:15
3.	"More Alone"	3:14
4.	"So Far for So Few"	3:31
5.	"All the Good"	3:39
6.	"No One's Listening"	3:06
7.	"You Should Be Worried"	1:43
8.	"Better Yet"	2:58
9.	"Cut Up High and Dry"	2:20
10.	"Ginger Moon"	2:21
11.	"End Credits"	3:06
Total length:		32:24
