= Mischievous Moon =

Studio album by Jill Barber
- Released: April 5, 2011
- Studio: Canterbury Company, Glenn Gould Studio
- Genre: Jazz, Pop
- Length: 39:03
- Label: Outside Music
- Producer: Les Cooper

Jill Barber chronology
Chances (2008)	Mischievous Moon (2011)	Chansons (2013)

Singles from Mischievous Moon
- 1. "Tell Me" Released: Feb 15, 2011; 2. "Dis-moi" Released: Feb 15, 2011

Mischievous Moon is Canadian singer-songwriter Jill Barber's fifth album, released April 5, 2011.

== Track listing ==
No.	Title	Length
1.	"Mischievous Moon"	4:14
2.	"Took Me By Surprise"	4:09
3.	"Tell Me"	4:10
4.	"Daydreamin'"	3:05
5.	"A Wish Under My Pillow"	2:08
6.	"Steal Away"	4:10
7.	"Any Fool Can Fall In Love"	3:11
8.	"Tenderness"	3:51
9.	"If It Weren't For Loving You"	3:29
10.	"Lullaby"	1:49
11.	"Dis-Moi"	4:08

== Charts ==
Chart performance for Mischievous Moon
Chart (2011–2012)	Peak position
Canadian Albums (Nielsen SoundScan)	31
US Top Jazz Albums (Billboard)	14
US Traditional Jazz Albums (Billboard)	8
