= And the Conquering Sun =

Studio album by Gord Downie and The Sadies
- Released: 2014
- Recorded: 2007–2013
- Length: 30:05
- Label: Arts & Crafts Productions
- Producer: The Sadies

Gord Downie chronology
The Grand Bounce (2010)	And the Conquering Sun (2014)	Secret Path (2016)

The Sadies chronology
Internal Sounds (2013)	And the Conquering Sun (2014)	Northern Passages (2017)

And the Conquering Sun is a collaborative album by Gord Downie and The Sadies, released on Arts & Crafts Productions in 2014.

The album began when The Sadies were invited to perform on the CBC Radio concert series Fuse; the series centred on collaborative concerts between multiple artists, and the Sadies selected Downie as they had just completed opening for The Tragically Hip on that band's World Container tour. The set list they performed on that broadcast comprised covers of artists such as Roky Erickson, Johnny Cash and Iggy and the Stooges. Downie and the Sadies subsequently continued to occasionally write songs together, eventually deciding to release their original material as an album.

Downie and the Sadies supported the album with a concert tour, with performances from the tour compiled for the 2026 live album Live at 6 O'Clock.

== Critical response ==
Retrospective professional ratings
Review scores
Source	Rating
AllMusic	3.5/5 stars

Writing for Exclaim!, Joshua Kloke called the album uneven, but noted that "when the five of them are on the same page, there's an intimidating energy. On the crashing "Crater," Downie sounds 20 years younger, with a snarl reminiscent of the Tragically Hip's dark, mid-'90s heyday." For AllMusic, Mark Deming wrote that "with the Sadies providing top-shelf backing, Downie is free to go into rant mode on his lyrics, and while he reveals he can sound insightful and literate when he's of a mind (particularly on "Devil Enough" and "Saved"), he clearly relishes the chance to go on a beatnik lyrical bender on some of these tunes."

== Track listing ==
1. "Crater" – 2:46
2. "The Conquering Sun" – 3:09
3. "Los Angeles Times" – 3:34
4. "One Good Fast Job" – 2:27
5. "It Didn't Start to Break My Heart Until This Afternoon" – 4:02
6. "Budget Shoes" – 2:43
7. "Demand Destruction" – 2:38
8. "Devil Enough" – 3:15
9. "I'm Free, Disarray Me" – 2:25
10. "Saved" – 3:06
