= Good Brothers =

Good Brothers may refer to:

- Good Brothers (professional wrestling), an American tag team
- The Good Brothers, a Canadian musical group
