= Jill Barber =

Canadian singer-songwriter (born 1980)

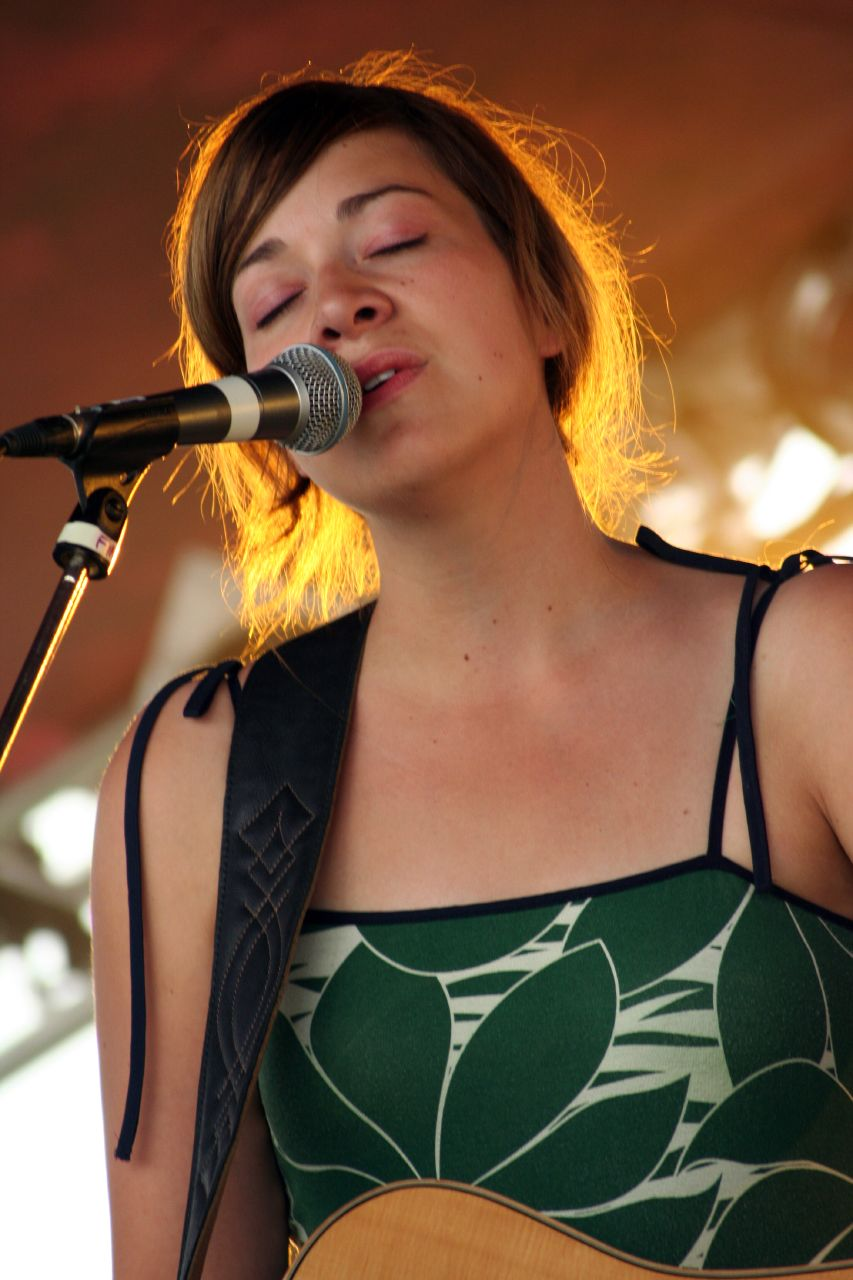
- Barber performing at 2007 Summer Sundae festival in Leicester, England

Background information
- Born: Gillian Grace Barber; February 6, 1980 (age 46); Mississauga, Ontario, Canada
- Origin: Halifax, Nova Scotia, Canada
- Genres: Folk-pop, folk rock, vocal jazz
- Occupation: Singer-songwriter
- Instruments: Guitar, vocals
- Years active: 2002–present
- Label: Outside Music
- Website: www.jillbarber.com

Jill Barber (born Gillian Grace Barber; February 6, 1980) is a Canadian singer-songwriter. Originally associated with the folk-pop genre, she has performed vocal jazz and pop music on her more recent albums.

== Early life ==
Barber was born and raised in Port Credit, a neighbourhood in the south-central part of Mississauga, just west of Toronto. Her brother is singer-songwriter Matthew Barber. She studied at Queen's University before pursuing her musical career full time.

== Career ==
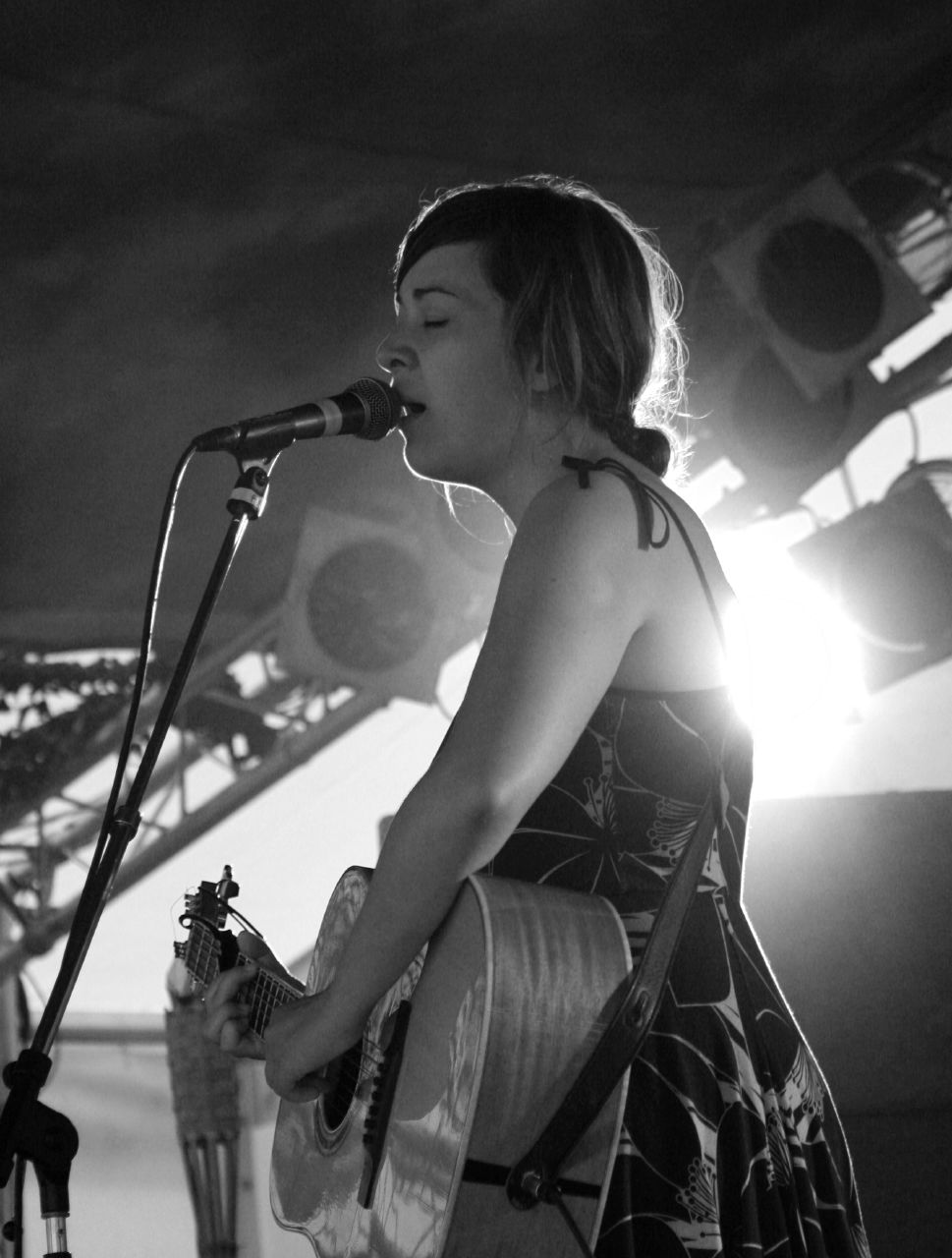
Jill Barber performing at the 2007 Summer Sundae festival in Leicester, England

Barber won the Female Artist Recording of the Year award for her debut album Oh Heart at the 2005 Music Nova Scotia Awards. In 2007, Barber earned her fourth win as Best Local Solo Artist (Female) in The Coast’s annual "Best of Music Reader’s Poll", and her first win as Best Canadian Solo Artist (Female).

From February to March 2007, she toured Eastern Canada with Dan Hill as part of Stuart McLean's CBC Radio show The Vinyl Cafe. She returned to the Vinyl Cafe Tour in 2009 performing across Canada with Matt Andersen. In 2008, Barber released Chances, a jazz album with full orchestral arrangements which was partially co-written with her producer Les Cooper, while also collaborating on several songs with Canadian music legend Ron Sexsmith.

This album led to a new level in touring reaching audiences across the globe while earning two Juno Award nominations including New Artist of the Year. The title track to this album was featured on the Netflix series Orange Is the New Black, at the end of season 1, episode 1.

She followed up with the album Mischievous Moon, released through Outside Music in 2011. In the same year, Jill and Matthew Barber collaborated on a cover of The Hardship Post's "Your Sunshine", which appeared on the charity compilation album Have Not Been the Same – Vol. 1: Too Cool to Live, Too Smart to Die.

Barber has performed predominantly in English. She has also recorded and performed "Une femme doit faire" and French translations of two of her songs, "All My Dreams" ("Tous mes rêves") and "Tell Me" ("Dis-moi"). Her 2013 album Chansons, a selection of cover versions of classic songs from Quebec and France, was her first album of material recorded and performed entirely in French.

Barber won the SiriusXM 2012 Jazz Artist of the Year award, as well as the 2013 Western Canadian Francophone Album of the Year for Chansons.

In 2016, Barber co-produced an album The Family Album, with her brother Matthew Barber, also a singer-songwriter. The album consists of original songs written by Jill and Matthew Barber along with covers of songs by Canadian artists, Gene MacClellan Ian Tyson, and Neil Young. The album won a Juno award for Contemporary Roots Album of the year in 2017.

Her solo album, Metaphora, was released in June 2018. She followed up with another French-language album, Entre nous, in 2020, and with Homemaker in 2023.

In 2025 Jill and Matthew Barber contributed a cover of Joel Plaskett's "Light of the Moon" to the Plaskett tribute album Songs from the Gang.

=== Author ===
Barber has written two children's books, Baby's Lullaby and Music is for Everyone.

== Charity ==
Barber is mentor to young women as part of the Girls Action Foundation's Light A Spark initiative, and an ambassador for Save the Children.

== Personal life ==
Barber is married to CBC Radio 3 personality Grant Lawrence. They have two children.

== Discography ==
- A Note to Follow So (2002)
- For All Time (Dependent/Baudelaire, 2006)
- Chances (Outside Music, 2008)
- Mischievous Moon (Outside, 2011)
- Chansons (Outside, 2013)
- Fool's Gold (Outside, 2014)
- The Family Album with Matthew Barber (Outside, 2016)
- Metaphora (Outside, 2018)
- Entre nous (Outside, 2018)
- Homemaker (Outside, 2023)
- Encore! (2024)

== Awards and nominations ==
- 2005 East Coast Music Awards
  - nominated Female Artist of the Year
  - nominated Folk Recording of the Year for the album Oh Heart
- 2007 East Coast Music Awards
  - won Best Album of the Year for the album For All Time
  - won Female Artist of the Year
  - nominated Folk Recording of the Year
  - nominated Songwriter of the Year for the song "Don't Go Easy"
- 2008 Juno Awards
  - nominated New Artist of the Year
- 2016 Canadian Folk Music Awards
  - nominated Producer of the Year
- 2017 Juno Awards
  - Contemporary Roots Album of the Year for the album The Family Album (shared with Matthew Barber)
