= Lustre Parfait =

Studio album by Gord Downie and Bob Rock
- Released: May 5, 2023
- Recorded: 2009–2016
- Length: 62:12
- Label: Arts & Crafts
- Producer: Bob Rock

Gord Downie chronology
| Away Is Mine (2020) | Lustre Parfait (2023) |

Lustre Parfait is a studio album by singer Gord Downie and musician-producer Bob Rock, released on May 5, 2023, through Arts & Crafts Productions. It is the second album of original material released after Downie's death from brain cancer in 2017. Lustre Parfait features songs Downie and Rock created together in the 2010s after Rock produced two albums by Downie’s band The Tragically Hip: World Container and We Are the Same.

Downie was known to have recorded a solo project with Rock, but its status was unclear at Gordie’s death. Rock later clarified the recording sessions were largely completed at Downie’s death, but Rock felt emotionally overwhelmed and took a break before completing the album.

The album's title track was released in October 2022 as a preview. In November, "The Raven and the Red-Tailed Hawk" was released as the title track of a three-song EP that also included "Lustre Parfait" and the song "Is There Nowhere"; in February 2023, "The Moment Is a Wild Place" was released as the lead track of a six-song preview EP, which also featured all three of the already-released songs as well as the album tracks "Something More" and "Camaro".

Rock described working with Downie on the album's songs as one of the great highlights of his professional life.

Supporting musicians on Lustre Parfait include Abe Laboriel Jr., Tom Keenlyside, Steve Madaio, Camille Henderson and Saffron Henderson.

== Track listing ==
All lyrics are written by Gord Downie; all music is composed by Bob Rock.

Lustre Parfait track listing
| No. | Title | Length |
|---|---|---|
| 1. | "Greyboy Says" | 3:43 |
| 2. | "The Raven and the Red-Tailed Hawk" | 4:38 |
| 3. | "Lustre Parfait" | 3:53 |
| 4. | "The Moment Is a Wild Place" | 7:26 |
| 5. | "Something More" | 3:11 |
| 6. | "Camaro" | 3:08 |
| 7. | "The North Shore" | 4:42 |
| 8. | "Is There Nowhere" | 4:26 |
| 9. | "To Catch the Truth" | 4:03 |
| 10. | "Let Me Howl" | 6:19 |
| 11. | "HellBreaksLoose" | 4:54 |
| 12. | "Safest Day of the Year" | 4:55 |
| 13. | "In the Field" | 3:16 |
| 14. | "There Goes the Sun" | 3:38 |
| Total length: | | 62:12 |

== Personnel ==
Musicians

- Gord Downie – lead vocals (all tracks), background vocals (tracks 1, 2, 6, 9, 10)
- Bob Rock – guitar (all tracks), background vocals (tracks 1, 5–7, 10, 11), keyboards (1–6, 8, 12), percussion (1–4, 6, 9–12)
- Jamey Koch – bass guitar (1–5, 7–13), synthesizer (2, 5, 6, 8, 10–12), background vocals (2, 6, 7, 9)
- Abe Laboriel Jr. – percussion (1)
- Pat Steward – drums (2, 9, 10, 12, 13)
- Adam Greenholtz – keyboards (2, 5, 6, 8–10, 12), percussion (3, 5, 6, 8, 13), background vocals (7)
- Tom Anselmi – keyboards (2, 6, 10, 11)
- Zac Rae – keyboards (2, 6)
- Camille Henderson – background vocals (3, 6)
- Saffron Henderson – background vocals (3)
- Sean Nelson – drums (3, 4, 7)
- Chris Gestrin – keyboards (3, 8–10, 13)
- Tom Keenlyside – saxophone (3), horn (10)
- Steve Madaio – trumpet (3)
- Alan Chang – keyboards (4)
- Jamie Edwards – keyboards (4, 7, 14)
- Johnny Fay – drums (5, 6, 11), background vocals (11)
- Patrick Downie – percussion (5)
- John Webster – keyboards (7)
- Pete Finney – pedal steel (7, 14)
- Che Dorval – background vocals (8)
- Ryan Enockson – keyboards (10)
- Lenny Castro – percussion (10)
- Rafael Padilla – percussion (10)
- Tiki Pasillas – percussion (10)
- Jamie Muhoberac – keyboards (11)
- Chris Wyse – bass guitar (14)
- Dave Pierce – horn (14)

Technical

- Bob Rock – production, mixing
- Adam Greenholtz – additional production, mixing, engineering
- Jamey Koch – additional production
- Chris Allgood – mastering
- Emily Lazar – mastering
- Eric Helmkamp – engineering
- Ryan Enockson – engineering
- Dominic Civiero – engineering (4)
