= Introduce Yerself =

Studio album by Gord Downie
- Released: October 27, 2017
- Recorded: 2016–2017
- Studios: The Bathouse (Bath); Revolution (Toronto); Giant (Toronto)
- Length: 73:42
- Label: Arts & Crafts Productions
- Producer: Kevin Drew

Gord Downie chronology
Secret Path (2016)	Introduce Yerself (2017)	Away Is Mine (2020)

Introduce Yerself is the sixth solo album by Canadian singer and songwriter Gord Downie, released posthumously on October 27, 2017, ten days after his death. A double album consisting of 23 songs which Downie has described as each being about specific people in his life.It was the last solo album Downie completed, although his brothers Patrick and Mike subsequently confirmed additional unreleased material would be released in the future. The album Away Is Mine, which comprises the last songs Downie ever recorded and was completed by producer Nyles Spencer following Downie's death, was released in 2020.

== Background ==
Downie and producer Kevin Drew began work on the album in early 2016, after Downie received his diagnosis with glioblastoma but before it was publicized. Due to Downie's health status, and the uncertainty around how much time he would have to complete the album, most songs were included as first takes; 17 songs were recorded over the 2016 sessions, but then the project was placed on hold as Downie and his band The Tragically Hip undertook the Man Machine Poem Tour, and the release and promotion of Secret Path. In 2017, Drew and Downie reconvened to record 10 additional songs Downie had written during the intervening time.

== Critical reception ==
Professional ratings
Review scores
Source	Rating
Rolling Stone	4/5 stars
Pitchfork	7.4/10 stars
The Spill Magazine	4.5/5 stars
Exclaim	8/10 stars
Toronto Star	4/5 stars
Toronto Sun	5/5 stars

Brad Wheeler of The Globe and Mail wrote that the album is much more direct and personal than Downie's typically oblique songwriting with The Tragically Hip. He ultimately concluded that "[b]ecause it was completed in Mr. Downie's final months, Introduce Yerself will be compared to the leave-taking LPs of David Bowie (Blackstar) and Leonard Cohen (You Want It Darker). But where Mr. Bowie flashed a cape and disappeared with a dramatic flourish and Mr. Cohen offered something of a prayer, Mr. Downie's kind-hearted sentimentality compares more closely with the folksy manner of Neil Young's Prairie Wind, recorded after the singer-songwriter's near-death experience in 2005."

For Exclaim!, Calum Slingerland compared the album's instrumentation to Downie's previous album Secret Path, and concluded that "Introduce Yerself finds Downie fully, completely and unequivocally himself." The publication ranked the album #10 on their list of the Top 20 Pop & Rock Albums of 2017.

Ben Rayner of the Toronto Star wrote that the album "cannot be divorced from the tragic circumstances of its creation, nor is it really intended to be." He noted as well that "Although he's by turns as cryptic and wryly humorous as ever, Downie has never opened himself up this much on record before, actually naming names on tunes like "Nancy", "Ricky Please" and "My First Girlfriend" but otherwise peopling the songs on Introduce Yerself with so much specific detail that the recipients of that love will recognize themselves in the music when they hear it."

== Awards ==
At the Juno Awards of 2018, the album won the Juno Award for Adult Alternative Album of the Year, Downie and Drew won Songwriter of the Year for "A Natural", "Introduce Yerself" and "The North", and Downie won the Artist of the Year. In a tribute to Downie at the Juno Awards ceremony, Sarah Harmer, Dallas Green and Kevin Hearn performed a medley of the album's title track with the Tragically Hip song "Bobcaygeon".

== Track listing ==
All tracks are written by Gord Downie and Kevin Drew, except where noted.

No.	Title	Writer(s)	Length
1.	"First Person"		3:10
2.	"Wolf’s Home"	Downie	3:14
3.	"Bedtime"		3:38
4.	"Introduce Yerself"		2:44
5.	"Coco Chanel No. 5"	Downie	3:32
6.	"Ricky Please"		2:34
7.	"Safe Is Dead"		3:52
8.	"Spoon"		2:39
9.	"A Natural"		3:47
10.	"Faith Faith"		3:01
11.	"My First Girlfriend"		4:19
12.	"Yer Ashore"	Downie	1:30
13.	"Love Over Money"		2:41
14.	"You, Me and the B’s"	Downie	2:46
15.	"Snowflake"		4:09
16.	"A Better End"		4:06
17.	"Nancy"	Downie	2:25
18.	"Thinking About Us"		2:08
19.	"The Road"		3:04
20.	"You Are the Bird"		2:48
21.	"The Lake"	Downie	3:09
22.	"Far Away and Blurred"		4:38
23.	"The North"		3:48
Total length:			73:42

== Personnel ==
Personnel taken from the album's CD booklet.

- Gord Downie – vocals, acoustic and electric guitars, congas ("Spoon"), synth ("Far Away and Blurred")
- Kevin Drew – piano, bass, keyboards, organ, acoustic and electric guitars, drums, percussion, background vocals ("Safe is Dead")

Guest musicians

- Dave Hamelin – drums ("Bedtime", "Coco Chanel No. 5", "Ricky Please", "Spoon", "Snowflake", "Thinking About Us"), synths ("Wolf's Home", "A Natural", "My First Girlfriend", "Snowflake" "Thinking About Us", "The Road", "Far Away and Blurred", "The North"), B3 organ ("Nancy")
- Nyles Spencer – keys ("Love Over Money", "A Better End"), beats/sampler ("Love Over Money", "You, Me and the B's", "A Better End"), morse code synth ("The Road")
- David Koster – drums ("Safe Is Dead", "Far Away and Blurred"), background vocals ("Safe Is Dead")
- Patrick Downie – background vocals and percussion ("Safe Is Dead")
- Gillian Reiss – background vocals and percussion ("Safe Is Dead")

Technical personnel

- Kevin Drew – production, mixing
- Dave Hamelin – additional production ("Wolf's Home"), mixing
- Nyles Spencer – mixing, engineering
- Luke Schindler – mixing
- Eric Boulanger – mastering

== Charts ==
Chart (2017)	Peak position
Canadian Albums (Billboard)	1
