= Ingeborg Mohr =

Austrian-born Canadian artist

- Born: December 8, 1921; Innsbruck, Austria
- Died: January 5, 2004 (aged 82); Howe Island, Ontario, Canada
- Education: University of Breslau
- Known for: Painter
- Style: Batik
- Movement: Abstract expressionism
- Spouse: J. W. "Hans" Mohr
- Elected: Ontario Society of Artists; Royal Canadian Academy of Arts

Ingeborg Mohr (1921 – 2004) was an Austrian-born Canadian artist.

She was born in Innsbruck. Although she was interested in art from a young age, she was discouraged from pursuing a career as an artist after she was diagnosed with polio at the age of 18. Mohr studied art history at the University of Breslau from 1943 to 1945. However, she went on to study art at the School of Fine Arts in Linz and at the School of Fine Arts in Graz. In 1952, she married Dr. J. W. "Hans" Mohr. She came to Canada with her husband and children in 1954. They first settled in Saskatchewan where she painted prairie landscapes in watercolour. They moved to Toronto in 1955. In 1981, she moved with her husband to Howe Island.

After she moved to Toronto, her painting changed from figurative to abstract expressionism. Mohr subsequently worked in batik for four years. After 1971, she used oil paint on paper. In 1975, she was named to the Ontario Society of Artists and, in 1980, was elected to the Royal Canadian Academy of Arts. Her work was exhibited at the Robert McLaughlin Gallery, at Trent University, at Massey College of the University of Toronto, at the Agnes Etherington Art Centre, at Goethe-House and the Merton Gallery in Toronto and at the Simon Fraser Gallery in British Columbia.

She died on Howe Island at the age of 82.
