= Chances (Jill Barber album) =

Studio album by Jill Barber
- Released: October 14, 2008
- Genres: Jazz, traditional pop
- Label: Outside Music
- Producer: Les Cooper

Jill Barber chronology
For All Time (2006)	Chances (2008)	Mischievous Moon (2011)

Chances is an album by Canadian singer-songwriter Jill Barber, released October 14, 2008 on Outside Music.

The album was noted for marking a departure from Barber's established folk-pop style. On Chances, Barber instead works within a jazz style which was compared by fans to Doris Day and Peggy Lee.

The album was recorded primarily at Blue Rodeo's Woodshed Studios in Toronto, with some string and horn arrangements recorded at the Glenn Gould Studio. Three of the songs were co-written with Ron Sexsmith, and the album was produced by Toronto singer-songwriter Les Cooper.

The album was named as a longlisted nominee for the 2009 Polaris Music Prize on June 15, 2009.

== Track listing ==
1. "Chances" – 3:43
2. "Be My Man" – 3:01
3. "Old Flame" – 2:42
4. "Oh My My" – 4:43
5. "Take It Off Your Mind" – 3:39
6. "Wishing Well" – 3:42
7. "Never Quit Loving You" – 2:58
8. "All My Dreams" – 2:41
9. "Leaving You" – 2:52
10. "One More Time" – 3:41
