= Coke Machine Glow =

Studio album by Gordon Downie
- Released: 3 July 2001
- Recorded: May 2–12, 2000
- Genres: Alternative rock, Spoken Word
- Length: 63:40
- Label: Zoë Records
- Producers: Gordon Downie, Josh Finlayson, Steven Drake

Gordon Downie chronology
Coke Machine Glow (2001)	Battle of the Nudes (2003)

Professional ratings
Review scores
Source	Rating
Allmusic	3/5 stars

Coke Machine Glow is the first solo album released by Gord Downie, the singer for The Tragically Hip. It was released in 2001.

Early copies of the album were released as a joint package with a book by Downie, also titled Coke Machine Glow. The book included the song lyrics from the album and other poetry. The book included photographs by Toronto-based artist Michael Adamson. As a result of the album's sales, the book is one of the best-selling volumes of poetry ever published by a Canadian writer.

Downie's backing band on Coke Machine Glow was credited as "the Goddamned Band". Participating musicians included Julie Doiron, Josh Finlayson, Atom Egoyan and members of The Dinner Is Ruined.

An online music publication formed in 2002 was named after the album.

In 2021, Arts & Crafts Productions announced the release of Coke Machine Glow: Songwriters' Cabal, an expanded 20th anniversary reissue of the album. The reissue will feature a bonus disc of unreleased demos, alternate versions and outtakes, as well as an audiobook version of the poetry book read by figures such as singer-songwriter Sarah Harmer and actors Dan Aykroyd and Bruce McCulloch.

== Track listing ==
All tracks are written by Gord Downie unless otherwise noted.

No.	Title	Writer(s)	Length
1.	"Starpainters"	Downie; Morningstar	1:41
2.	"Vancouver Divorce"		3:56
3.	"SF Song"		3:15
4.	"Trick Rider"		4:24
5.	"Canada Geese"		2:27
6.	"Chancellor"		4:26
7.	"The Never-Ending Present"		5:06
8.	"Nothing but Heartache in Your Social Life"	Downie; Atom Egoyan	3:08
9.	"Blackflies"		3:58
10.	"Lofty Pines"		4:51
11.	"Boy Bruised by Butterfly Chase"	Downie; Louie Perez	3:10
12.	"Mystery"	Downie; Egoyan	3:59
13.	"Elaborate"		5:25
14.	"Yer Possessed"		3:39
15.	"Every Irrelevance"		5:21
16.	"Insomniacs of the World, Goodnight"	Downie; Morningstar	4:59
Total length:			63:40
