= Gord Downie =

Canadian musician and writer (1964–2017)

Gord Downie CM
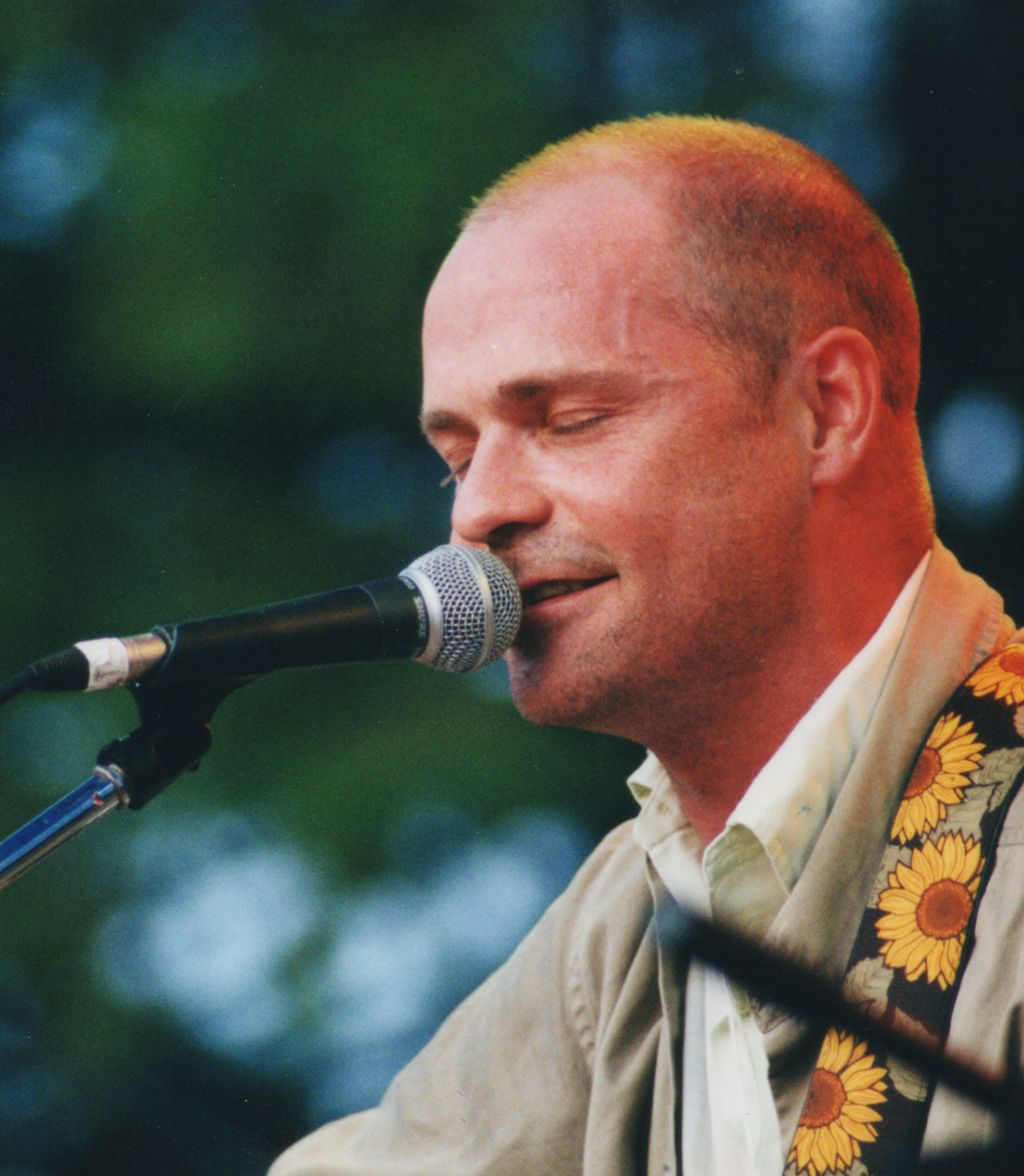
- Downie performing in Guelph, Ontario, 2001

Background information
- Also known as: Gord; Downie; Wicapi Omani
- Born: Gordon Edgar Downie; February 6, 1964; Amherstview, Ontario, Canada
- Origin: Kingston, Ontario, Canada
- Died: October 17, 2017 (aged 53) Toronto, Ontario, Canada
- Occupations: Musician; singer; lyricist
- Instruments: Vocals; guitar; harmonica; drums
- Years active: 1983–2017
- Website: thehip.com

Gordon Edgar Downie CM (February 6, 1964 – October 17, 2017) was a Canadian rock singer-songwriter, musician, writer, poet, and activist. He was the singer and lyricist for the Canadian rock band The Tragically Hip, which he fronted from its formation in 1984 until his death in 2017. He is widely regarded as one of the most influential artists in Canada's music history.

In addition to 13 albums with the Tragically Hip, Downie released eight solo albums, three posthumously: Coke Machine Glow (2001), Battle of the Nudes (2003), The Grand Bounce (2010), And the Conquering Sun (2014), Secret Path (2016), Introduce Yerself (2017), Away Is Mine (2020), and Lustre Parfait (2023). His first to hit number one was Introduce Yerself, shortly after his death. His family and managers said future releases are planned, including solo material and unreleased work with the Hip.

== Early life ==
Gordon Edgar Downie was born in Amherstview, Ontario, and raised in Kingston, Ontario, along with his brothers Mike and Patrick, and sisters Charlyn and Paula. He was the son of Lorna (Neal) and Edgar Charles Downie, a travelling salesman, later a real estate broker and developer. In Kingston, Downie attended the downtown high school Kingston Collegiate and Vocational Institute, where other members of the Tragically Hip also attended. In high school, Downie was the front man for a band called the Slinks performing at the KCVI Variety show and rivalling older members Rob Baker and Gord Sinclair's band the Rodents. After graduating from high school, Downie attended Queen's University where he majored in film studies, graduating with a Bachelor of Arts in 1986.

== Career ==
=== The Tragically Hip ===
In 1984, at age 20, Downie formed the Tragically Hip with Rodents members Rob Baker and Gord Sinclair, another younger Kingston Collegiate and Vocational Institute alumnus, Johnny Fay, and saxophonist Davis Manning. In 1986, Manning left the band as guitarist-vocalist Paul Langlois joined. Originally, the band covered popular British rock songs from the 1960s. In an interview with Canadian music journalist Steve Newton, Downie noted that the Tragically Hip's early set list was originally drawn to bands such as The Yardbirds and The Stones, a decision that was made because the Hip wished other Kingston bar bands would also play the genre. The Tragically Hip quickly became famous once MCA Records president Bruce Dickinson saw them performing at Massey Hall in Toronto and offered them a record deal.

Downie became known for his showmanship in live Hip performances, incorporating mid-song spoken-word rants, zany gestures and movements, and especially on their final Man Machine Poem Tour, his bold wardrobe.

Downie began pursuing a solo career with the release of Coke Machine Glow in 2001. He published his first poetry and prose collection alongside the album and under the same title. The backing musicians, credited as the Goddamned Band, consisted of indie rock band the Dinner Is Ruined, Josh Finlayson of Skydiggers and singer-songwriter Julie Doiron. He released his second solo album, Battle of the Nudes, in 2003 before returning to the studio with the Tragically Hip. His third solo effort, The Grand Bounce, was released in 2010. Both it and Battle of the Nudes are credited as Gord Downie and the Country of Miracles.

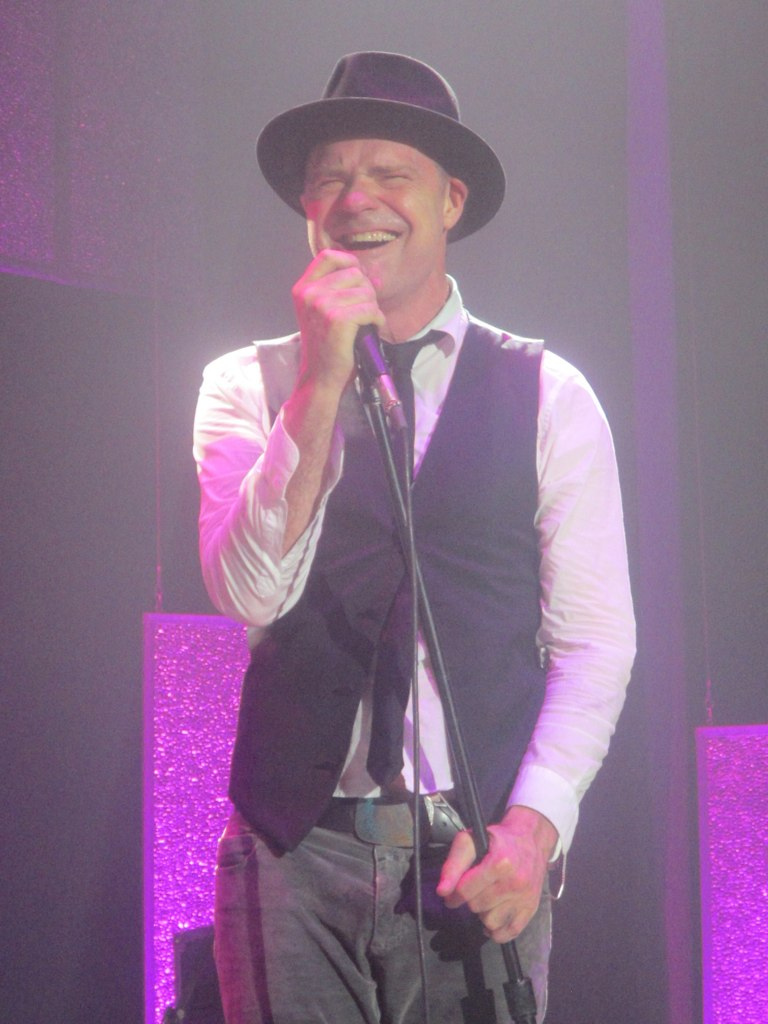
Downie performing in 2013

=== Collaborations ===
In addition to his solo works, Downie collaborated with several fellow Canadian and international artists. His most famous Canadian collaborations are with Richard Terfry (better known as Buck 65), Dallas Green of City and Colour and Alexisonfire, the Sadies and Fucked Up. Terfry collaborated with Downie on the song "Whispers of the Waves" off the album 20 Odd Years. Terfry composed the track and with the help of Charles Austen, his co-writer, decided Downie's vocals would be the best fit for their song. In 2008, Downie appeared as a guest vocalist on City and Colour's single "Sleeping Sickness". In 2014, Downie released an album with the Sadies called And the Conquering Sun. He commented on working with the Sadies, saying, "I enjoy getting together with those guys; it's a whole other universe. They're writing all the music and I'm writing all the lyrics and we're coming up with some neat stuff. You do it for the company but I'm genuinely shocked by the themes and things you touch based on the music you're singing to. That's really compelling to me." The album consists of ten songs.

Also in 2014 Downie appeared as a guest vocalist on "The Art of Patrons", a song from Fucked Up's album Glass Boys.

On February 2, 2017, Downie joined Blue Rodeo onstage at Massey Hall for a performance of Blue Rodeo's song "Lost Together". This marked his last public appearance before his death.

=== In other media ===
Downie had cameo appearances in Men with Brooms, in which the Tragically Hip play a curling team. Downie also made a cameo appearance in the 2008 indie drama Nothing Really Matters, directed by Jean-Marc Piché. Downie also appears in the Trailer Park Boys movie The Big Dirty, in which he and Alex Lifeson play a pair of police officers. More recently, he and other members of the band appeared in the episode of Trailer Park Boys entitled "Say Goodnight to the Bad Guys", in which he is harassed while eating a bologna sandwich at a singles dance. Downie was also featured in the sitcom Corner Gas in the episode "Rock On!" in which the Tragically Hip are shown as a local band practising in the main character's garage. Colin James is also featured in the episode. Downie also appeared in Michael McGowan's 2008 film, One Week. A documentary film, Long Time Running, about the Tragically Hip's summer 2016 cross-Canada farewell concert tour, premiered at the Toronto International Film Festival in September 2017.

== Philanthropic work ==
=== Environmentalism ===
Downie was heavily involved in environmental movements, especially issues concerning water rights. He was a board member of Lake Ontario Waterkeeper. With Lake Ontario Waterkeeper, Downie helped work on a cause to prevent a cement company from burning tires for fuel. He was also a part of the Swim Drink Fish Music club, a project that unites artists and environmentalists in a music club to raise money for Waterkeeper organizations in Canada. Downie served as a Swim Drink Fish "Ambassador, board member, and creative force".

=== The Great Moon Gathering ===
In February 2012 in Fort Albany, Ontario, Downie and the Tragically Hip played at the Great Moon Gathering, a yearly educational conference that takes place in various communities along Northern Ontario's James Bay coast. Its focus is on youth learning and combining Cree education with the contemporary world. The venue was small and not typical of the band. Author Joseph Boyden, who invited them, said their motivation was to "initiate a guerrilla act of love for a people who are so thoroughly underrepresented but now, somehow, overexposed for only their shortcomings. A guerrilla act of love to show the rest of the country what strength and artistry, grace and humour the Cree possess." In addition to the Tragically Hip's performance, Downie sang a song with a local band, Northern Revolution. The song "Goodnight Attawapiskat" from the album Now for Plan A was a result of this trip.

=== Indigenous affairs ===
On October 13, 2016, Downie and his brother Mike, along with the Wenjack family, announced the founding of the Gord Downie and Chanie Wenjack Fund to support reconciliation between Indigenous and non-Indigenous peoples. The fund is a part of Downie's legacy and commitment to Canada's First Peoples. Chanie Wenjack was a young Indigenous boy who died trying to escape a residential school, who became the central character of Downie's Secret Path project. The Gord Downie and Chanie Wenjack Fund is a registered charity.

At the Assembly of First Nations in Gatineau, Quebec, on December 6, 2016, National Chief Perry Bellegarde honoured Downie with an eagle feather, a symbol of the creator above, for his support of the Indigenous peoples of Canada. Bellegarde also bestowed on Downie an honorary aboriginal name, Wicapi Omani, which is Lakota for "man who walks among the stars".

Downie took to Parliament Hill on July 2, 2017, to speak out for Canada's young Indigenous people, likening it to the same kind of pain young people suffered in the now defunct residential schools.

=== Awards and recognitions ===
In May 2016, Downie and his bandmates received honorary degrees from Queen's University. Downie was not able to attend the ceremony due to his illness which had not yet been made public.

On December 22, 2016, Downie was selected as The Canadian Press's Canadian Newsmaker of the Year and was the first entertainer selected for the title. In December 2017, Downie was again named Canadian Newsmaker of the Year for the second year in a row, in recognition of the public reaction to his death.

Downie, along with his Tragically Hip bandmates, was appointed a Member of the Order of Canada on June 19, 2017, for "their contribution to Canadian music and for their support of various social and environmental causes".

In December 2017, Percy Hatfield, the Member of Provincial Parliament (MPP) representing Windsor—Tecumseh introduced the bill Poet Laureate of Ontario Act In Memory of Gord Downie to the Legislative Assembly of Ontario. It was passed in December 2019, establishing the Poet Laureate of Ontario.

== Cancer diagnosis and farewell tour ==
In December 2015, shortly after attending his father's funeral, Downie was diagnosed with a terminal brain tumour. The Tragically Hip announced his diagnosis on their website on May 24, 2016. Doctors at Toronto's Sunnybrook Health Sciences Centre confirmed the same day that it was a glioblastoma, which had responded favourably to radiation and chemotherapy treatment but was not curable.

Downie toured with the band in summer 2016 to support Man Machine Poem, the band's 13th studio album. The tour's final concert was held at the Rogers K-Rock Centre in Kingston, Ontario, on August 20 and was broadcast and streamed live by the Canadian Broadcasting Corporation on television, radio and internet. It was viewed by an estimated 11.7 million people.

The tour was profiled in the 2017 documentary film Long Time Running, directed by Jennifer Baichwal and Nicholas de Pencier. The final concert was released on DVD under the title A National Celebration on December 24, 2017.

== Secret Path ==
In September 2016, Downie announced he would release a new solo album, Secret Path in October. The album was accompanied by a graphic novel on which he collaborated with Jeff Lemire, and an animated television film which aired on CBC Television. He also performed a few live shows to support the album, with supporting musicians Kevin Drew, Charles Spearin, Dave Hamelin, Kevin Hearn and Josh Finlayson.

At the 6th Canadian Screen Awards in 2018, Downie posthumously won two Canadian Screen Awards for the television version of Secret Path. The program won the Donald Brittain Award for Best Political or Social Documentary Program and Best Music in a Non-Fiction Program. At the 7th Canadian Screen Awards in 2019, two additional awards were won by Gord Downie's Secret Path in Concert, the CBC Television broadcast of Downie's 2016 Roy Thomson Hall performance of the album.

== Introduce Yerself ==
In September 2017, Downie announced what would be his final solo double-album titled Introduce Yerself; it was released on October 27, 2017, ten days after Downie's death.

At the Juno Awards of 2018, the album won the Juno Award for Adult Alternative Album of the Year, Downie and Drew won Songwriter of the Year for "A Natural", "Introduce Yerself" and "The North", and Downie won the Artist of the Year. In a tribute to Downie at the Juno Awards ceremony, Sarah Harmer, Dallas Green and Kevin Hearn performed a medley of the album's title track with the Tragically Hip song "Bobcaygeon".

== Personal life ==
Downie was married to Laura Leigh Usher, herself a breast cancer survivor. They had four children. Downie and Usher separated in 2015 before Downie's cancer diagnosis. They were not divorced at the time of Downie's death and had remained close friends. Under the stage name Kaya Usher, she released her own debut album as a singer, All This Is, in 2021 with the participation of two of their four children; some of the tracks feature Usher performing with a guitar that had once belonged to Downie.

Downie was the godson of Harry Sinden, a former hockey coach, general manager and president of the Boston Bruins.

== Death and reactions ==
Downie died of glioblastoma, a type of brain cancer, on October 17, 2017, at the age of 53 in Toronto. The surviving members of the Tragically Hip made the news of his death public the next morning by sharing an official statement from his family on their website:

Last night Gord quietly passed away with his beloved children and family close by.

Gord knew this day was coming – his response was to spend this precious time as he always had – making music, making memories and expressing deep gratitude to his family and friends for a life well lived, often sealing it with a kiss ... on the lips. Gord said he had lived many lives. As a musician, he lived "the life" for over 30 years, lucky to do most of it with his high school buddies. At home, he worked just as tirelessly at being a good father, son, brother, husband and friend. No one worked harder on every part of their life than Gord. No one.

We would like to thank all the kind folks at KGH and Sunnybrook, Gord's bandmates, management team, friends and fans. Thank you for all the help and support over the past two years.

Thank you everyone for all the respect, admiration and love you have given Gord throughout the years – those tender offerings touched his heart and he takes them with him now as he walks among the stars.

— The Downie Family, a statement on the Tragically Hip website

Upon hearing the news, Prime Minister Justin Trudeau released a tribute statement on his official website. Later in the day, he held a press conference at Parliament Hill at which he tearfully remembered Downie as "Our buddy Gord, who loved this country with everything he had—and not just loved it in a nebulous, 'Oh, I love Canada' way. He loved every hidden corner, every story, every aspect of this country that he celebrated his whole life." Canadian MP Tony Clement called upon the government to consider holding a state funeral for Downie, stating "I think he matters that much to Canadians." The House of Commons observed a moment of silence.

Downie is widely mourned in Canada. The CBC news broadcast, The National, spent 40 of its sixty-minute broadcast discussing Gord and The Hip. Several prominent Canadians posted tributes to Downie online, including actors Ryan Reynolds and Seth Rogen; Toronto mayor John Tory; singers k.d. lang and Neil Young; rapper Drake; and the rock group Rush. Additionally, several National Hockey League teams and players, as well as the league itself, paid tribute to Downie through social media, owing to the high popularity of the Tragically Hip's music among Canadian professional hockey players. The Toronto Maple Leafs honoured Downie with a moment of silence before their game on October 18, during which the retired-jersey banner for Bill Barilko – whom Downie had written about in the Tragically Hip song "Fifty Mission Cap" – was lowered from the rafters of the Air Canada Centre.

Residents of the Ontario village of Bobcaygeon, which Downie had written about in the song of the same name, held a candlelight vigil for him the night after his death; a large public gathering also took place at Springer Market Square in the band's hometown of Kingston.

In Kingston, Mayor Bryan Paterson issued a statement, laid a wreath in Springer Market Square near City Hall, and signed a condolence banner. Kingston Transit buses displayed "GORD, WE'LL MISS YOU" on their electronic destination signs, alternately with the regular route number and name display.

Canadian radio stations responded heavily to Downie's death, with early figures indicating the band's radio airplay on October 18 increased 1,500 percent compared to a normal day. Most rock radio stations dropped regular programming to shift to an all-Tragically Hip format for the day, and some further announced that they would continue the all-Hip format through the weekend until the morning of 23 October. Several stations temporarily dropped their usual brand names to rebrand themselves "GORD-FM", including CHEZ-FM in Ottawa, CFRQ-FM in Halifax, CJRQ-FM in Sudbury, CJQQ-FM in Timmins, CKEZ-FM in New Glasgow and CIKR-FM in the Tragically Hip's hometown of Kingston

Stations in other formats, such as contemporary hit radio, adult contemporary or country music, typically did not suspend their normal playlists, but still added some Tragically Hip songs to the day's rotation. "Ahead by a Century" was the single most-played song on Canadian radio on the day Downie's death was announced.

CBC Radio preempted some of its regular programming in favour of a Downie tribute special hosted by Rich Terfry; although news of Downie's death broke just 20 minutes before airtime, CBC Radio One's entertainment magazine show Q dropped its planned lineup in favour of a live Downie tribute special.

In the wake of Downie's death, CTV rescheduled the planned broadcast premiere of Long Time Running, a documentary film by Jennifer Baichwal and Nicholas de Pencier about the Man Machine Poem Tour of 2016, from November 12 to October 20. CBC Television broadcast his solo Roy Thomson Hall concert of Secret Path on October 22.

Arjun Sahgal, an oncologist with the Sunnybrook Hospital who had been involved in treating Downie after his cancer diagnosis, lauded Downie's strength and courage in continuing to tour, make music and use his fame to publicize both cancer awareness and indigenous reconciliation issues, and called Downie "a Terry Fox in the modern day".

== Posthumous archival releases ==
In 2018, two recordings by Downie, "The East Wind" and "At the Quinte Hotel", were released on the compilation album The Al Purdy Songbook. A different recording of "The East Wind" appeared on The Grand Bounce, and "At the Quinte Hotel" was previously released in video form, but never in an audio recording.

In June 2020, the Tragically Hip and manager Jake Gold announced that they were undertaking an "archaeological dig" to select music and memorabilia from the band's archives for future release.

In August, Downie's Twitter account was reactivated, and began posting a series of teaser photographs of handwritten song lyrics, accompanied by numbers that appeared to be a calendar countdown to the date of October 15. On September 21, it was confirmed that Away Is Mine, an album comprising the last songs Downie recorded in his lifetime, will be released on October 16. The album is co-written with Josh Finlayson, a frequent collaborator, and is accompanied with an acoustic version of all the produced tracks. Also, a series of music videos for all the songs on the album were created by Canadian artists and released on YouTube.

In October 2022, the song "Lustre Parfait" was released to streaming services as a preview of an album collecting various previously unreleased songs that Downie had recorded with Bob Rock. The album, titled Lustre Parfait, was released on May 5, 2023.

In 2025, a spoken-word piece that Downie had performed at a benefit for Lake Ontario Waterkeeper in the 2000s was featured, with new musical backing, on Rheostatics' album The Great Lakes Suite.

Live at 6 O'Clock, an album compiling live performances from Downie's 2014 tour with The Sadies following the release of And the Conquering Sun, was released in February 2026.

== Discography ==
=== Studio albums ===
Year	Album	CAN
2001	Coke Machine Glow	26
2003	Battle of the Nudes	33
2010	The Grand Bounce (with the Country of Miracles)	8
2014	And the Conquering Sun (with the Sadies)	10
2016	Secret Path	4
2017	Introduce Yerself	1
2020	Away Is Mine	3
2021	Coke Machine Glow: Songwriters' Cabal	10
2023	Lustre Parfait (with Bob Rock)	25

=== Live Albums ===
- Live at 6 O'Clock (2026)

=== Compilations ===
- Our Power (2006): "Figment (Acoustic version)"

=== Singles ===
- "Vancouver Divorce" (2001)
- "Chancellor" (2001)
- "Pascal's Submarine" (2003)
- "Figment" (2003)
- "Sleeping Sickness" by City and Colour (2008)
- "The East Wind" (2010)
- "The Dance and Its Disappearance" (2010)
- "Crater" (with the Sadies) (2014)
- "The Stranger" (2016)
- "Introduce Yerself" (2017)
- "Hotel Worth" (2020)
- "Lustre Parfait" (2022)
- "The Raven and the Red-Tailed Hawk" (2022)
- "Greyboy Says" (2023)

=== Music videos ===
- "Chancellor" (2001)
- "Pascal's Submarine" (2003)
- "11th Fret" (2003)
- "The East Wind" (2010)
- "Crater" (2014)
- "The Stranger" (2016)
- "Secret Path" (documentary and full animated film) (2016)
- "Greyboy Says" (2023)

=== Music videos for Away is Mine (2020) ===
- "Hotel Worth"
- "Useless Nights"
- "I Am Lost"
- "About Blank"
- "River Don't Care"
- "The Least Impossible"
- "Traffic Is Magic"
- "Away Is Mine"
- "No Solace"
- "Untitled"
