= Darker Circles =

Studio album by The Sadies
- Released: April 27, 2010
- Genre: Alt country
- Length: 36:07
- Label: Yep Roc Records
- Producer: Gary Louris

The Sadies chronology
Country Club (2009)	Darker Circles (2010)

Professional ratings
Review scores
Source	Rating
Allmusic	4/5 stars
The A.V. Club	A−
Tiny Mix Tapes	3/5 stars

Darker Circles is a 2010 album by Canadian alt-country group The Sadies. It was released on April 27, 2010, on Yep Roc Records.

The album was a shortlisted nominee for the 2010 Polaris Music Prize.

Darker Circles was named top album of the year in Exclaim! magazine's 2010 Folk & Country Year in Review. The album was praised for its richly detailed storytelling, "staying on top of the Sadies' progress over the past decade has been a wild ride. Aside from an endless string of collaborations, each album has edged closer to psychedelic country-rock perfection. The biggest obstacle has always been raising their songwriting game to the same level as their instrumental prowess, and that has finally been accomplished on Darker Circles."

== Track listing ==
All tracks written by The Sadies except where noted.

1. "Another Year Again" – 3:18
2. "Cut Corners" – 3:20
3. "Another Day Again" – 2:06
4. "Tell Her What I Said" – 4:53
5. "The Quiet One" – 3:26
6. "Postcards" – 2:41
7. "Whispering Circles" – 3:12
8. "Idle Tomorrows" (Gary Louris, The Sadies)– 3:28
9. "Choosing To Fly" – 2:16
10. "Violet and Jeffrey Lee" – 3:13
11. "10 More Songs" – 4:14
