= Girls Action Foundation =

Canadian organization

- Abbreviation: Girls Action
- Formation: 1995
- Type: National charitable foundation
- Legal status: active
- Purpose: Offers programs, funding and training to Canadian organizations working with girls and young women
- Headquarters: Montreal, Quebec, Canada
- Location: 24 Mont Royal West, Suite 601, Montreal, Quebec
- Region served: Canada
- Official language: English French
- CEO: Saman Ashan, Executive Director (2012-present). Founder: Tatiana Fraser
- Staff: 20, with 300 Network members
- Website: girlsactionfoundation.ca

Girls Action Foundation provides funds and training to over 100 girls’ programs in communities across Canada. It also offers programs, research and support to a network of over 300 partnering organizations and projects, reaching over 60,000 Canadian girls and young women annually, particularly in under-represented communities including Northern, racialised, low-income, Aboriginal and immigrant communities.

== Working in partnership ==
Girls Action Foundation collaborates with several national and international organizations that work with girls and young women, including Canadian Women's Foundation, G(irls)20 Summit, Girls and Women, J.W. McConnell Family Foundation, Simone de Beauvoir Institute at Concordia University, Status of Women Canada, YWCA Canada, and over 300 network member organizations.

The Light a Spark Campaign was launched in 2011 to encourage accomplished women to motivate and inspire the next generation. More than 64 Canadian women took part in the initiative as mentors, spokeswomen or fundraisers, including musicians Melissa Auf der Maur and Jenny Salgado, environmentalist Severn Cullis-Suzuki, triathlete Tereza Macel, social justice activist Judy Rebick, writers Lillian Allen and Kim Thúy Ly, and journalist Isabelle Racicot.

== Services ==
Girls Action Foundation provides spaces for girls to speak out, build skills and create action on issues that are important and real to them. Its local girls’ programs address violence prevention, health promotion, media literacy and leadership and its national leadership program offers long-term investment and support to young women who are changemakers in their communities.

By providing publications, resources and practical support, Girls Action fosters learning, connections and collaborations. Its programs include coaching, training and networking opportunities that help develop community initiatives and girls’ programs.

== Programs and projects ==
•Amplify
A national training program for girls’ program providers that involves designing programs, creating empowering spaces for marginalized girls, developing workshops and facilitation skills, as well as deepening understanding of popular education and building community support, while sharing resources, challenges and strategies.

•Art Attack
After school arts program for 14- to 17-year-old girls in the Montreal area. Combines popular education and media arts-based activities where the girls explore themes related to body image, self-esteem, violence, dating, pop culture, the media, and more.

•Bridge Project
A national collaboration to support young women's civic engagement, created to fill a gap in resources and programming that responds to the realities and issues facing immigrant and refugee girls and young women.

•ELLE
A national 5-day leadership program for young women between 16 and 25 years of age that includes training, networking opportunities, long-term mentorship program and Leadership Capacity Grants. Through capacity building, peer learning and reflection, young women develop personal and community leadership skills to foster social innovation.

•Girlhood Exchange Symposium
In partnership with McGill University and the Institute of Gender, Sexuality and Feminist Studies, a half-day forum brings together academics, practitioners and policy makers in the "girlhood" field to share research, practices and ideas.

•Girls and Equality: Media Arts Workshops
A workshop to provide support for community groups and organizations that are interested in offering media arts training to strengthen their initiatives for girls and young women from ethno-cultural communities.

•Girls Club
After school violence prevention and empowerment program for 11- to 13-year-old girls in the Montreal area. Offers workshops with guests from the community who share their passion and expertise with the girls in areas such as theatre, self-defence, media arts, yoga and much more.

•GTA Project
Networking and skill-building events that will provide young women and program organizers in the GTA area with opportunities to share resources and best practices, network, learn new skills and strategies, and avoid overlap in work.

•Indigenous Young Women: Speaking our Truths, Building our Strengths
A project that focuses on Indigenous young women's leadership, empowerment, solidarity-building, and ending violence.

•Make Some Noise!
Project based program that focuses on media arts, social justice issues and leadership skills. Young women across Canada participate in hands-on photography and video workshops in their communities and share their multi-media creations on kickaction.ca.

•Meet-Ups
Regional, one-day networking and capacity building events for young women members in the Girls Action National Network.

•National Day of Action
An annual event that encourages girls and young women to take action to reduce racism, violence and poverty.

•National Retreat
An annual 2-day workshop for national network members that provides training, facilitates opportunities to connect with other organizations and individuals working for girls’ empowerment and well-being.

•Young Women Future Leaders
A project that aims to build leadership capacity amongst emerging young women leaders across Canada with a focus on understanding challenges and opportunities faced by racialized girls and young women.

•Young Women's Leadership in Rural Development
A project that supports the leadership development of young women in rural areas by improving the skills of young women to make their communities more livable and sustainable, and equipping communities to increase opportunities for rural young women's advancement.

•ZOOM in on Girls
Regional gatherings that bring together young women and girls’ program organizers for a full day of exchanges, workshops, networking and skill building activities.

== Publications ==
•Amplify: Designing Spaces and Programs for Girls (2010)
A compilation of expertise, knowledge and insights from Girls Action team and National Network Members including innovative best practices, a comprehensive look how to organize and facilitate girls’ programs and a collection of over 50 activities from girls’ programmers across Canada.

•Bridge Guide (2011)
A collaborative print and online publication that offers resources, knowledge and skill-building opportunities to support the leadership and civic participation of girls and young women from racialized communities.

•Building Bridges Across Generations: Redefining Intergenerational Spaces for Girls’ Empowerment (2010)
A compilation of practices and reflections of groups that create intergenerational spaces for social change.

•Girls Action Research Review (2009)
A compilation of innovative research about girls, their issues, and the factors that impact their lives, including quotations and statistics that highlight the realities of girls and young women in Canada.

•Girls in Canada Today (2011)
A report that presents results of a national survey conducted by Angus Reid Public Opinion, as well as research on girls’ lives.

•Immigrant Girls Research Review (2010)
A compilation of research on immigrant girls’ and young women's issues.

•Northern Girls Research Review (2009)
A compilation of research on Northern, rural and aboriginal girls’ and young women's issues, including information that can reinforce funding proposals, program development and communication materials.

•Racialized Girls Research Review (2009)
A compilation of research on racialized girls’ and young women's issues.

•Redefining Leadership: How Girls Action Foundation Supports Young Women to Lead Social Change (2011)
A collection of Girls Action's reflections, learnings and successful practices built up over ten years of developing and delivering leadership and mentorship programs for young women.

•The Need for a Gender-Sensitive Approach to the Mental Health of Young Canadians (2008)
Presents current Canadian research on mental health, based on data collected through national and provincial surveys and provides a snapshot of mental health among young Canadians aged 10 to 24.

== Foundational principles ==
Girls Action Foundation applies five principles to its foundational model and work: popular education, integrated analysis, social action and change, critically asset-based and organic.

== History ==
1995 Girls Action Foundation (formerly Power Camp National) founded by three young women studying at the University of Ottawa.

1998 A sister project, Filles d’Action, begins serving the francophone community.

2001 First national meeting held to bring together community organizations engaged in initiatives for girls.

2003 National Network has 40 member organizations.

2004 Girls’ Club is launched in inner-city Montreal and the first National Network Retreat takes place.

2005 First National Day of Action, an annual event that encourages girls and young women to take action to reduce racism, violence and poverty.

2006 kickaction.ca, a website for girls making a difference, is launched. Partnered with members to bring Aboriginal and racialized young women's voices to the World Urban Forum in Vancouver. First Make Some Noise training workshop takes place.

2007 First Amplify, a 4-day annual training program that on designing and leading girls’ programs with 32 participants from across Canada. Zoom sur les filles, a networking and training event for organizations working with francophone girls, is started.

2008 Power Camp National becomes Girls Action Foundation. Seventy girls and young women from Northern Canada gather to build leadership skills and a northern network for girls’ empowerment at Northern Light. Project Elle, an innovative mentorship and leadership program for girls and young women aged 16 to 24, is launched.

2009 National Network has 150 member organizations.

2010 Launch of Why Girls? resources on violence prevention, sexual health, media and pop culture, and leadership - tools designed to support educators, parents, girls’ programmers and the media.

2011 National Network has over 300 member organizations. Launch Light a Spark Campaign. Commission national survey with Angus Reid that reveals public concern about challenges faced by girls in Canada.
