= Outside Music =

Canadian record label and distributor

- Founded: 2001
- Founder: Lloyd Nishimura
- Genre: Rock, country, vocal jazz
- Country of origin: Canada
- Location: Burlington, Ontario
- Official website: outside-music.com

Outside Music is a Canadian record label and distributor founded by Lloyd Nishimura in 2001. In 2007, it expanded to include an artist management division which includes Jill Barber, Matthew Barber, Aidan Knight, Justin Rutledge as management clients.

The Outside Music Label released The Sadies's Tremendous Efforts and albums by Billy Bragg, Tinariwen, The Super Friendz, and the soundtrack to the indie film The Life and Hard Times of Guy Terrifico.

In 2010, The Sadies's Darker Circles and The Besnard Lakes's The Besnard Lakes Are the Roaring Night appeared on the Polaris Music Prize shortlist while in 2011, Little Scream's The Golden Record, Sloan's The Double Cross, Black Mountain's Wilderness Heart and One Hundred Dollars's Songs of Man all garnered Polaris long list nominations. Matthew Barber, Jill Barber, Oh Susanna, The Sadies, and The Hylozoists have all received Juno Award nominations for albums released on the Outside Music Label.

On December 1, 2018, Outside Music and Distribution Select merged their sales and distribution services, while maintaining their respective offices.

== Notable mentions and awards ==
- 2007 Jill Barber won Female Artist of the Year as well as Best Album of the Year for For All Time at the East Coast Music Awards. She also received nominations for Folk Recording of the Year and Songwriter of the Year for the song "Don't Go Easy"
- 2008 Jill Barber was nominated for New Artist of the Year and her album For All Time; nominated in the solo category for Roots and Traditional Album at the Junos.
- 2008 The Sadies were nominated for a Juno Award for Best Roots/Traditional Band for the album New Seasons.
- 2009 Matthew Barber received Juno nomination for the record "Ghost Notes" in the Roots & Traditional Album Of the Year: Solo category.
- 2009 Jill Barber's Chances long listed for a Polaris Music Prize.
- 2009 Jill Barber won two East Coast Music Awards for her album Chances; Jazz Recording of the Year and Female Solo Recording of the Year.
- 2009 Sebastien Grainger & The Mountains was nominated for Indie Video of the Year category at the Much Music Video Awards for "Who Do We Care For?"
- 2010 Tinariwen's album Imidiwan: Companions: Companions took the prize for best album in the 2010 Uncut Music Award.
- 2010 Tinariwen performed for the Vancouver 2010 Olympics at the Orpheum in Vancouver.
- 2010 The Besnard Lakes nominated for the SOCAN ECHO Prize for songwriting.
- 2010 The Sadies appeared on the Junos telecast in a tribute to The Band alongside longtime collaborator and The band co-founder Garth Hudson.
- 2011 The Sadies's album Darker Circles was nominated for Best Album and they took home the Folk/Roots Group of the Year award at the Canadian Music Fest Indies. Additionally Black Mountain was nominated in the Best Rock Album category for Wilderness Heart.
- 2011 Polaris Music Prize Long List nominees included label roster artists Black Mountain - Wilderness Heart, Little Scream - The Golden Record, One Hundred Dollars - Songs of Man, Sloan - The Double Cross.
- 2011 Matthew Barber's song "Where the River Bends" was used by Hockey Night in Canada in a video honouring the NHL players who had died in the summer.
- 2012 Sloan's album "The Double Cross" was nominated for a Juno Award for Rock Album of the Year.
- 2013 Rose Cousins's album We Have Made a Spark won the Juno Award for Roots & Traditional Album of the Year, Solo
- 2013 Justin Rutledge's album Valleyheart won the Canadian Folk Music Award for Contemporary Album of The Year
- 2014 Justin Rutledge's album Valleyheart won the Juno Award for Roots & Traditional Album of The Year, Solo
- 2015 Jenn Grant's album Compostela was nominated for Adult Alternative Album of the Year and Best Songwriter of the Year at Juno Awards.

== Roster ==
- Jill Barber
- Matthew Barber
- Old Man Luedecke
- The Besnard Lakes
- Rose Cousins
- Evening Hymns
- Folly and the Hunter
- Jenn Grant
- The Hidden Cameras
- Aidan Knight
- Tami Neilson
- Justin Rutledge
- Snowblink
- The Weather Station

== Past roster ==
- Baby Eagle
- King Cobb Steelie
- Blood Meridian
- Sebastien Grainger
- Dog Day
- Woolly Leaves
- Tinariwen
- Rebekah Higgs
- Rock Plaza Central
- Billy Bragg
- The Weekend
- The Wailin' Jennys
- Little Scream
- Black Mountain
- Sloan

== Labels distributed through Outside ==
- 604 Records (vinyl only)
- ACT Music
- Aporia Records
- Asthmatic Kitty
- Awesome Tapes from Africa
- anticon
- Ba Da Bing!
- Barsuk
- Bella Union
- Big Dada
- Blue Corn Music
- Bongo Beat
- Boompa Records
- Burger Records
- Butterscotch Records
- Canyon Records
- Cellar Live
- Chronograph Records
- Constellation
- The Control Group
- Cornerstone Records
- Crammed Discs
- Dead Daisy Records
- Do Right! Music
- Domino Recording Company
- Electro-Fi Records
- Fat Cat Records
- Fat Possum Records
- File Under: Music
- Flemish Eye
- Hardly Art
- Indica Records
- Jazz Cellar Café
- Kelp Records
- Kill Rock Stars
- Light in the Attic
- Metropolis Records
- Milagro
- Mint Records
- Mom+Pop
- Ninja Tune
- NorthernBlues Music
- Paper Bag Records
- Red House Records
- S.P.A.C.E
- Sacred Bones
- Saddle Creek Records
- Saved by Radio
- Six Degrees
- Songlines
- Soul Jazz
- Standard Form
- Sub Pop
- Thirsty Ear
- Unicorn Digital
- Valley Entertainment
- Vinyl Cafe
- White Swan Records
- White Whale Records
- Wichita Recordings
- Windham Hill
- weewerk
- Yep Roc
- You've Changed Records
- Zunior

== See also ==
- List of record labels
