= Phantom Power (The Tragically Hip album) =

1998 studio album by the Tragically Hip

Studio album by The Tragically Hip
- Released: July 14, 1998
- Studios: The Bathouse, Bath, Ontario
- Genre: Alternative rock
- Length: 50:26
- Label: Universal
- Producers: Steve Berlin; Mark Vreeken; The Tragically Hip

The Tragically Hip chronology
| Live Between Us (1997) | Phantom Power (1998) | Music @ Work (2000) |

Singles from Phantom Power
- 1. "Poets" Released: June 1998; 2. "Something On" Released: 1998; 3. "Fireworks" Released: November 1998; 4. "Bobcaygeon" Released: February 1999; 5. "Escape Is at Hand for the Travellin' Man" Released: 1999

Professional ratings
Review scores
| Source | Rating |
|---|---|
| Allmusic | 3/5 stars |
| NME | (4/10) link |
| Pitchfork Media | (7.3/10) link |

Phantom Power is the sixth studio album by the Canadian rock band The Tragically Hip. The album was released in 1998. It won the 1999 Juno Awards for Best Rock Album and Best Album Design.

== Songs ==
The album's first single, "Poets", reached No. 1 on RPM's alternative chart, and stayed there for 12 consecutive weeks, longer than any other song in the history of that chart. The fourth track "Bobcaygeon" was also released as a single, and won the Juno Award for Single of the Year in 2000. It has since become recognized as one of the band's signature songs. The song "Escape Is at Hand for the Travellin' Man" is a tribute to Jim Ellison of Material Issue. The band recorded the song "Something On" while stuck in the studio during the ice storm of 1998.

== Commercial performance ==
Phantom Power debuted at No. 1 on the Canadian Albums Chart with 108,000 units sold. By February 1999, the album had sold more than 400,000 copies in Canada. Between 1996 and 2016, Phantom Power was the seventh best-selling album by a Canadian band in Canada. The album has been certified eight times platinum in Canada.

== Reissue ==
In August 2023, the band announced the release of a 25th anniversary box set edition of the album, set for November 23, 2023. Along with remastered versions of the original album's songs, the anniversary edition will also feature a two-disc live set performed at the Metropol in Pittsburgh, Pennsylvania in 1998, five outtakes not included on the original album, and seven alternate versions of songs on the album.

== Track listing ==
All songs were written by The Tragically Hip.

Original 1998 track listing
| No. | Title | Length |
|---|---|---|
| 1. | "Poets" | 3:59 |
| 2. | "Something On" | 3:21 |
| 3. | "Save the Planet" | 3:38 |
| 4. | "Bobcaygeon" | 4:55 |
| 5. | "Thompson Girl" | 3:32 |
| 6. | "Membership" | 4:40 |
| 7. | "Fireworks" | 3:56 |
| 8. | "Vapour Trails" | 4:29 |
| 9. | "The Rules" | 3:46 |
| 10. | "Chagrin Falls" | 4:10 |
| 11. | "Escape Is at Hand for the Travellin' Man" | 5:52 |
| 12. | "Emperor Penguin" | 4:08 |

2023 box set outtakes and alternate versions
| No. | Title | Length |
|---|---|---|
| 1. | "Bumblebee" |
| 2. | "Insomniacs" |
| 3. | "Songwriters Cabal" |
| 4. | "Vegas Strip" |
| 5. | "Mystery" |
| 6. | "Poets (Super Farmer Nano Baby Version)" |
| 7. | "Something On" |
| 8. | "Chagrin Falls" |
| 9. | "Fireworks" |
| 10. | "Thompson Girl" |
| 11. | "Escape Is at Hand for the Travelin' Man" |
| 12. | "Bobcaygeon" |

Recorded Live October 2, 1998, at the Metropol, Pittsburgh, Pennsylvania
| No. | Title | Length |
|---|---|---|
| 1. | "Save the Planet" |
| 2. | "Twist My Arm" |
| 3. | "Poets" |
| 4. | "Gift Shop" |
| 5. | "Bobcaygeon" |
| 6. | "Nautical Disaster" |
| 7. | "Ahead by a Century" |
| 8. | "The Luxury" |
| 9. | "Fireworks" |
| 10. | "Springtime in Vienna" |
| 11. | "Chagrin Falls" |
| 12. | "New Orleans Is Sinking" |
| 13. | "Grace, Too" |
| 14. | "Escape Is at Hand for the Travelin' Man" |
| 15. | "At the Hundredth Meridian" |

== Personnel ==
Credits are adapted from the album's liner notes.

The Tragically Hip

- Gord Downie – lead vocals
- Rob Baker – lead guitar
- Paul Langlois – rhythm guitar, backing vocals
- Gord Sinclair – bass, backing vocals
- Johnny Fay – drums

Additional musicians

- Steve Berlin - keyboards, flute, percussion
- Bob Egan - lap steel, pedal steel, mandolin

Production

- Steve Berlin - Producer
- Mark Vreeken - Recording, Mixing
- Don Smith - Mixing
- Jim Rondinelli - Mixing
- Stephen Marcussen - Mastering
- Andrew McLachlan and Brock Ostrom - Art direction
- Bernard Clark and David Ajax - Photography

== Certifications ==
| Region | Certification | Certified units/sales |
|---|---|---|
| Canada (Music Canada) | 8× Platinum | 800,000^{‡} |
^{‡} Sales+streaming figures based on certification alone.

== Year-end charts ==
| Chart (2002) | Position |
|---|---|
| Canadian Alternative Albums (Nielsen SoundScan) | 193 |
