= Live Between Us =

Live album by The Tragically Hip
- Released: May 24, 1997
- Recorded: November 23, 1996
- Venue: Cobo Arena, Detroit, Michigan
- Genre: Rock
- Length: 70:31
- Label: MCA
- Producer: The Tragically Hip; Mark Vreeken

The Tragically Hip chronology
Trouble at the Henhouse (1996)	Live Between Us (1997)	Phantom Power (1998)

Professional ratings
Review scores
Source	Rating
AllMusic	2.5/5 stars

Live Between Us is the first full-length live album by Canadian rock band The Tragically Hip.

The album was recorded on November 23, 1996, at Cobo Arena in Detroit, Michigan, during the band's North American tour in support of Trouble at the Henhouse.

Lead singer Gordon Downie was known for his intensity and spontaneity during the band's live concerts such as telling rants/stories, observations, and random comments before, during, and after songs, among other things. As such, this live recording documents him incorporating snippets of other songs in the middle of the band's own songs. This includes John Lennon's "Imagine" during "Grace, Too", Crowded House's "Into Temptation" during "Twist My Arm", David Bowie/Iggy Pop's "China Girl" and The Beach Boys' "Don't Worry Baby" during "New Orleans Is Sinking", and both Jane Siberry's "The Temple" and Rheostatics' "Bad Time to Be Poor" during "Nautical Disaster"; in addition, a lyrical snippet from Downie's own solo song "Every Irrelevance" is spoken as the introduction to "Ahead by a Century", and part of the band's own unreleased but widely bootlegged song "Montreal" appears in "Courage".

Rheostatics were the opening act on the tour as documented by this album's liner notes, and announced by Downie during the fade-in at the beginning of the album's first track.

In the week of the album's release, eight songs from the album appeared in the week's Top 20 singles chart.

The title comes from graffiti in Kingston, Ontario, which read "The Hip live between us." This graffiti was penned by early band member Davis Manning, describing the impact that the band was having on his relationship with his girlfriend. The mural remained on the wall until the mid-2000s when it was painted over by the property owner. However, it is immortalized on the CD graphic.

== Commercial performance ==
Live Between Us sold 35,000 units in its first two days and debuted at #1 on the Canadian Albums Chart on the strength of the first two days' sales. The album sold 400,000 units by the end of 1997. Between 1996 and 2016, Live Between Us was the best-selling live album by a Canadian band in Canada and the third best-selling live album by a Canadian artist overall in Canada. In Flanders, Live Between Us debuted at #47. The album was certified six times platinum on September 12, 2024.

== Track listing ==
All songs written by the Tragically Hip.

1. "Grace, Too" – 6:18
2. "Fully Completely" – 4:11
3. "Springtime in Vienna" – 4:37
4. "Twist My Arm" – 4:05
5. "Gift Shop" – 5:09
6. "Ahead by a Century" – 5:25
7. "The Luxury" – 4:08
8. "Courage" – 5:08
9. "New Orleans Is Sinking" – 6:22
10. "Don't Wake Daddy" – 5:30
11. "Scared" – 5:00
12. "Blow at High Dough" – 4:54
13. "Nautical Disaster" – 5:31
14. "The Wherewithal" – 4:14

== The Tragically Hip ==
- Gord Downie – lead vocals
- Rob Baker – lead guitar
- Paul Langlois – rhythm guitar, backing vocals
- Gord Sinclair – bass, backing vocals
- Johnny Fay – drums

== Year-end charts ==
Chart (1997)	Position
Canadian Albums (Nielsen SoundScan)	31

Chart (2002)	Position
Canadian Alternative Albums (Nielsen SoundScan)	107

== Certifications ==
Region	Certification	Certified units/sales
Canada (Music Canada)	6× Platinum	600,000^{‡}
^{‡} Sales+streaming figures based on certification alone.
