= Bobcaygeon (song) =

1999 single by the Tragically Hip

Single by The Tragically Hip

from the album Phantom Power
- Released: February 1999
- Recorded: 1998
- Genre: Alternative rock; Folk rock; Country rock
- Length: 4:55 (album version); 4:12 (radio edit)
- Label: Universal
- Songwriters: Rob Baker; Gordon Downie; Johnny Fay; Paul Langlois; Gord Sinclair

The Tragically Hip singles chronology
"Fireworks" (1998)	"Bobcaygeon" (1999)	"My Music at Work" (2000)

"Bobcaygeon" is a song by Canadian rock band the Tragically Hip. It was released in February 1999 as a single from their sixth album, Phantom Power, and has come to be recognized as one of the band's most enduring and beloved signature songs.

== Background ==
The song is named after Bobcaygeon, Ontario, a town in the "Cottage country" region of the Kawartha Lakes, about 160 kilometres (100 mi) northeast of Toronto. The song's narrator works in the city as a police officer, a job he finds stressful and sometimes ponders quitting, but unwinds from the stress and restores his spirit by spending his weekends with a loved one in the rural idyll of Bobcaygeon, where he sees "the constellations/reveal themselves one star at a time" in contrast to the city's "dull and hypothetical" skies that are "falling one cloud at a time".

In live performances, Tragically Hip singer Gord Downie typically explained "Bobcaygeon" as a "cop love song," though the identity of the narrator's beloved changed from performance to performance. In the original video, the male cop's partner is female, but Downie sometimes introduced the song in concert as being "about a couple of gay cops that fall in love".

According to Downie, the song was not specifically written about the town itself, but rather any small town would have worked for the theme and he settled on "Bobcaygeon" primarily because it was the only place name he could find that came close to rhyming with "constellation".

A secondary theme of the song addresses racism and anti-Semitism; Downie has sometimes introduced the song with "This one asks the question: evil in the open or evil just below the surface?", and Rob Baker's guitar has "This machine kills fascists" written on it in the song's video. In the song's bridge, the British rock band The Men They Couldn't Hang are performing a concert at Toronto's Horseshoe Tavern ("with its checkerboard floors"); when they begin to perform their song "Ghosts of Cable Street", which is about the Battle of Cable Street riot in London in 1936, in an "Aryan twang", a similar brawl or riot appears to erupt between fascist and anti-fascist activists in the audience, which then weighs heavily on the officer's mind as he drives back to Bobcaygeon in the final verse. (In the video, however, the brawl is visually depicted as occurring at a concert by "The Constellations".) A common interpretation is that the lyrics obliquely reference the Christie Pits riot of 1933, which arose from tensions between Toronto's working-class Jewish community and anti-semitic Swastika clubs following a baseball game; although the song's otherwise contemporary setting leaves this interpretation in question, a similar albeit less famous public brawl between the Heritage Front and Anti-Racist Action did occur in Toronto in 1993 just a few years before Downie wrote the song.

The song won the Juno Award for Single of the Year in 2000.

== Music video ==
Much of the "Bobcaygeon" video was filmed at a house in Scarborough, Ontario on Beare Road, a location formerly used in Canadian television productions including Anne of Green Gables and Road to Avonlea. The house burned to the ground in a fire in 2007.

Former MuchMusic and CBC personality Laurie Brown made an appearance in the video as a TV reporter.

== Cultural impact ==
The song resulted in the town of Bobcaygeon coming to occupy what has been described as a "mythical" place in Canada's collective imagination, as the archetype of a Canadian cottage country paradise.

In 2011 the band performed their first-ever concert in Bobcaygeon, a town ordinarily too small to hold a concert by a major touring rock band; Toronto Star music critic Jason Anderson described their performance of the song at that concert as "a moment of Canuck-rock significance that's roughly equivalent to Roger Waters doing Pink Floyd's The Wall in Berlin."

Following the band's announcement in 2016 that Downie had been diagnosed with terminal brain cancer, both the Toronto Star and Maclean's sent journalists to the town of Bobcaygeon to write about the residents' feelings about the song and the announcement. On the final night of the Man Machine Poem Tour, which saw the band's concert in Kingston broadcast nationally by CBC Television, the town held a public viewing on its main street; in addition to local residents, the event was also attended by a significant number of people who had made a "pilgrimage" to view the concert there because of the song. The "Concert Under the Constellations" was the largest public event in the town's history, garnered more widespread media coverage than any other public viewing party anywhere in Canada outside of Kingston, and a fundraising initiative during the event resulted in the largest single tour-related donation to the Canadian Cancer Society.

Zoomer Media called it one of the ten best Canadian songs of all time. In 2026, CBC Music published a ranking of the top ten Tragically Hip songs to mark the tenth anniversary of the band's historic final performance, ranking "Bobcaygeon" at #2.

The song is on the soundtrack for Trailer Park Boys: The Movie.

== Covers ==
Pop singer Damhnait Doyle covered the song on her 2007 album Lights Down Low.

Singer-songwriter Justin Rutledge recorded a cover of the song on his 2014 EP Spring Is a Girl. It was originally recorded for his studio album Daredevil, which consisted entirely of Tragically Hip covers, but was held back for the follow-up EP.

During his 2016 tour, Dallas Green (City and Colour) regularly performed "Bobcaygeon". In a tribute to Downie at the Juno Awards of 2018 ceremony, Green, Sarah Harmer and Kevin Hearn performed a medley of "Bobcaygeon" with the title track from Downie's posthumous solo album Introduce Yerself.

At Blue Rodeo's concert in Toronto on August 20, 2016, which was occurring at the same time as the final concert of the Hip's Man Machine Poem Tour, Blue Rodeo performed a rendition of "Bobcaygeon" as video screens around the venue displayed scenes from the concurrent Hip concert in Kingston. Longtime Blue Rodeo guitarist and mandolinist Bob Egan, who was retiring from music and performing his final show with the band that evening, had been a guest musician on the original Tragically Hip recording of the song.

The Canadian indie rock band Paper Lions posted an a capella rendition of the song to their YouTube page in August 2016.

On the January 1, 2017 episode of CBC Radio 2's The Strombo Show, a special Tragically Hip tribute episode in which other Canadian musicians performed live versions of Hip songs, "Bobcaygeon" was performed by both Blue Rodeo and Rheostatics as the opening and closing song.

For CBC Music's "Juno 365" project, a promotional initiative for the Juno Awards of 2018 which featured contemporary artists performing covers of past Juno-winning songs, Scott Helman and Midnight Shine both performed covers of "Bobcaygeon".

In 2018, Canadian indie folk band Reuben and the Dark recorded a cover of "Bobcaygeon" as a charity single to benefit the Gord Downie and Chanie Wenjack Fund.

In 2022, sibling singer-songwriters T. Buckley and Mariel Buckley released a cover of the song.

At a May 2024 concert in Vancouver, American rock band Pearl Jam interpolated parts of "Bobcaygeon" into their own 1993 single "Daughter".

In 2024, country singer-songwriter Owen Riegling covered the song as an Amazon Music exclusive.

On September 5, 2024, it was one of three songs, alongside "Ahead by a Century" and "Grace, Too", performed by Choir! Choir! Choir! in a public singalong following the premiere of the documentary series The Tragically Hip: No Dress Rehearsal at the 2024 Toronto International Film Festival.

== Charts ==
=== Weekly charts ===
Chart (1999)	Peak position
Canadian RPM Singles Chart	3
Canadian RPM Rock Report	2
Canadian RPM Adult Contemporary Chart	43

Chart (2016)	Peak position
Canada Hot 100 (Billboard)	27

=== Year-end charts ===
Chart (1999)	Position
Canada Top Singles (RPM)	78
