= Live 8 concert, Barrie =

2005 concert in Ontario, Canada

On 2 July 2005, a Live 8 concert was held at Molson Park in Barrie, Ontario, Canada. Barrie is located 100 kilometres (62 mi) north of Toronto.

The event is also referred to as "Live 8 Toronto" or "Live 8 Canada".

About 35,000 people, full capacity at Park Place, were at the event, ranking eighth in attendance among the ten July 2 Live 8 concerts. Had a larger venue been available, organizers originally expected upwards of 150,000 spectators at the show. (see Location).

== Lineup ==
Past Live Aid performers are listed with an asterisk (*). In order of appearance:

- Dan Aykroyd and Tom Green (Hosts) (BA 11:00)
- Tom Cochrane – "Life Is A Highway", "No Regrets" (BA 11:03)
- Sam Roberts – "Brother Down", "Bridge To Nowhere", "Hard Road" (BA 11:29)
- Bryan Adams* – "Back To You", "Open Road", "This Side Of Paradise", "All for Love/Tears Are Not Enough" (BA 11:48)
- DobaCaracol and K'naan) "Nakilé", "Amazone", "Anda", "Soobax", "Until The Lion Learns To Speak" (BA 12:14)
- Simple Plan – "Shut Up!", "Jump", "Addicted", "Welcome to My Life" (BA 12:40)
- Bruce Cockburn – "If I Had a Rocket Launcher", "Call It Democracy", "Waiting For A Miracle" (BA 13:16)
- Les Trois Accords – "Hawaiienne", "Loin D'ici", "Turbo Sympathique" (BA 13:42)
- Randy Bachman & The Carpet Frogs – "Hey You", "You Ain't Seen Nothin' Yet", "Takin' Care of Business" (BA 14:08)
- Deep Purple – "Highway Star", "Smoke on the Water", "Hush" (BA 14:27)
- African Guitar Summit (BE 14:56)
- Great Big Sea – "Donkey Riding", "Excursion Around The Bay" (BA 15:22)
- Celine Dion – "Love Can Move Mountains" (BA 15:40)
- Blue Rodeo – "Heart Like Mine", "Try", "Are You Ready" (BA 15:53)
- Gordon Lightfoot – "Restless", "If You Could Read My Mind", "Let It Ride" (BA 16:21)
- Our Lady Peace – "Bird on the Wire", "Where Are You", "Innocent" (BA 16:47)
- Jet – "You're Like This", "Look What You've Done", "Are You Gonna Be My Girl" (BA 17:13)
- Jann Arden – "Where No One Knows Me", "Willing To Fall Down", "Good Mother" (BA 17:29)
- Mötley Crüe – "Kickstart My Heart", "Home Sweet Home", "Dr. Feelgood" (BA 17:55)
- The Tragically Hip – "My Music at Work", "Ahead By A Century", "Poets" (with Dan Aykroyd) (BA 18:23)
- DMC – "Machine Gun", "All Along the Watchtower", "Walk This Way" (BA 18:49)
- Barenaked Ladies – "Brian Wilson", "If I Had $1,000,000" (BA 19:15)
- Neil Young* – "Four Strong Winds" (with Pegi Young), "When God Made Me", "Rockin' in the Free World", "O Canada" (BA 19:49)

== Pre-show planning ==
=== Lineup ===
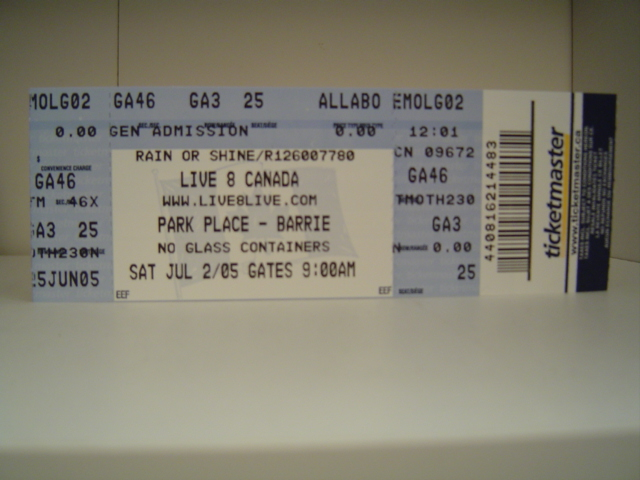
A Live 8 ticket for the Barrie show

Sibling duo Tegan and Sara were slated to be in the lineup, but had to drop out close to the date due to illness. Likewise, Burton Cummings was to perform with Randy Bachman, but also didn't attend, apparently also due to illness.

=== Location ===
For weeks leading up to the concert, several locations were considered as potential hosts for the Canadian Live 8 concert.

Parliament Hill, Ottawa, Ontario was the first choice for the concert. However, on June 10, the federal Public Works and Canadian Heritage departments, along with the Royal Canadian Mounted Police rejected the idea of using the site for Live 8. Government officials felt that Parliament Hill, with a capacity of 75,000 people was too small for the event, which was originally expected to attract over 150,000 participants. They were also concerned about damage to the local buildings and grounds.

On June 15, Bob Geldof announced Toronto, Ontario as the host of the Canadian Live 8 concert. At that point, several venues were considered as candidates for the concert: Downsview Park, which hosted the Molson Canadian Rocks for Toronto concert and a World Youth Day mass; Exhibition Place, which also hosted World Youth Day activities; Molson Amphitheatre, and Sunnyside Beach, which would have involved floating stages on Lake Ontario. Ultimately, none of these considerations were used for the concert. There were several financial and logistical problems related to these bids. For example, both Downsview Park and Molson Amphitheatre were hosting concerts on Canada Day (the day before Live 8) and it was impossible to set up the Live 8 stage a day before the concert.

On June 21, Park Place in Barrie, Ontario was finally announced as the official venue for the Canadian Live 8 concert by promoter, Michael Cohl.
