= Greasy Jungle =

Single by The Tragically Hip

from the album Day for Night
- Released: November 1994
- Genre: Alternative rock
- Length: 4:27
- Label: MCA
- Songwriter: The Tragically Hip
- Producer: Mark Howard

The Tragically Hip singles chronology
"Grace, Too" (1994)	"Greasy Jungle" (1994)	"Nautical Disaster" (1995)

"Greasy Jungle" is a song by Canadian rock band The Tragically Hip. It was released in November 1994 as the second single from the band's fourth studio album, Day for Night. At the time of its release, the song was the band's highest charting single ever in Canada, peaking at No. 8 on the RPM Canadian Singles Chart.

== Track listing ==
All tracks are written by The Tragically Hip.

No.	Title	Length
1.	"Greasy Jungle"	4:26
2.	"Fully Completely"	3:28
3.	"Cordelia"	4:07
Total length:		12:01

== Charts ==
=== Weekly charts ===
Chart (1994–1995)	Peak position
Canadian RPM Singles Chart	8
RPM Canadian Content Chart	5

=== Year-end charts ===
Chart (1995)	Position
Canada Top Singles (RPM)	66
