= 700 Ft. Ceiling =

1996 single by the Tragically Hip

Single by The Tragically Hip

from the album Trouble at the Henhouse
- Released: October 1996
- Genre: Alternative rock
- Length: 3:40
- Label: MCA
- Songwriter(s): The Tragically Hip
- Producer(s): Mark Vreeken, The Tragically Hip

The Tragically Hip singles chronology
"Gift Shop" (1996)	"700 Ft. Ceiling" (1996)	"Flamenco" (1997)

"700 Ft. Ceiling" is a song by Canadian rock group The Tragically Hip. It was released in October 1996 as the third single from their fifth studio album, Trouble at the Henhouse. The song peaked at number 22 on Canada's RPM Singles Chart.

== Charts ==
Chart (1996)	Peak position
Canadian RPM Singles Chart	22
