= So Hard Done By =

Single by The Tragically Hip

from the album Day for Night
- Released: May 1995
- Genre: Alternative rock
- Length: 3:29
- Label: MCA
- Songwriter(s): The Tragically Hip
- Producer(s): Mark Howard

The Tragically Hip singles chronology
"Nautical Disaster" (1995)	"So Hard Done By" (1995)	"Scared" (1995)

"So Hard Done By" is a song by Canadian rock band The Tragically Hip. It was released in May 1995 as the fourth single from the band's 1994 album, Day for Night. A different version is also on the 2014 re-issue of Fully Completely.

== Charts ==
Chart (1995)	Peak position
Canadian RPM Singles Chart	64
Canadian RPM Alternative 30	4
