= Nautical Disaster =

Single by The Tragically Hip

from the album Day for Night
- Released: February 1995
- Genre: Rock, alternative rock
- Length: 4:43
- Label: MCA
- Songwriter: The Tragically Hip
- Producer: Mark Howard

The Tragically Hip singles chronology
"Greasy Jungle" (1994)	"Nautical Disaster" (1995)	"So Hard Done By" (1995)

Music video
- "Nautical Disaster" on YouTube

"Nautical Disaster" is a song by Canadian rock band The Tragically Hip. It was released in February 1995 as the third single from the band's 1994 album, Day for Night. The song peaked at number 26 on the Canadian RPM Singles chart. The song was performed by the band on their 1995 appearance on Saturday Night Live, along with their previous single "Grace, Too".

== Background ==
The song is one of several Tragically Hip singles which were first performed as improvised bridge jams during live performances of the band's signature song "New Orleans Is Sinking". However, many of the lyrics had already been written by 1993: as part of the coverage of the 1993 Another Roadside Attraction festival tour, Gord Downie had agreed to send Toronto Star music writer Peter Howell a postcard from Vancouver to detail his thoughts on the first performance — and the postcard that Downie ultimately sent consisted of most of the lyrics to "Nautical Disaster".

== Live performance ==
In the version which appears on the band's 1997 live album Live Between Us, Downie incorporates a verse from "Bad Time to Be Poor", a song by that concert's opening act Rheostatics, and a verse from Jane Siberry's single "The Temple".

== Covers ==
The song was covered by singer-songwriter Justin Rutledge, both on his 2014 EP Spring Is a Girl and his 2021 album Islands.

== Legacy ==
In 2026, CBC Music published a ranking of the top ten Tragically Hip songs to mark the tenth anniversary of the band's historic final performance, ranking "Nautical Disaster" at #5.

== Track listing ==
All tracks are written by The Tragically Hip.

No.	Title	Length
1.	"Nautical Disaster"	4:41
2.	"New Orleans Is Sinking" (Live)	10:31
3.	"Pigeon Camera"	4:33
Total length:		19:45

== Charts ==
Chart (1995)	Peak position
Canadian RPM Singles Chart	26
