= Day for Night (The Tragically Hip album) =

1994 studio album by the Tragically Hip

Studio album by The Tragically Hip
- Released: 24 September 1994
- Recorded: May – June 1994
- Studio: Kingsway, New Orleans; Le Cave de Dave, Kingston, Ontario
- Genre: Alternative rock
- Length: 59:26
- Label: MCA
- Producer: Mark Howard; The Tragically Hip

The Tragically Hip chronology
Fully Completely (1992)	Day for Night (1994)	Trouble at the Henhouse (1996)

Singles from Day for Night
- 1. "Grace, Too" Released: September 1994; 2. "Greasy Jungle" Released: November 1994; 3. "Nautical Disaster" Released: February 1995; 4. "So Hard Done By" Released: May 1995; 5. "Scared" Released: September 1995; 6. "Thugs" Released: 1996

Day for Night is the fourth studio album by the Canadian rock band The Tragically Hip. It is named for the film of the same name.

== Music and lyrics ==
Musically, Day for Night is considered to be a continuation of "the same rock & roll fervor" of The Tragically Hip's previous album, Fully Completely. MacKenzie Wilson of AllMusic said of the album's lyrics: "Gordon Downie's signature lyrical mysteries are just as lush, but much more dark-spirited. And that's the intent, for he's looking for a listener to identify with his passionate wordplay, which is both sturdy and sensitive."

== Commercial performance ==
The album was very successful in Canada, with domestic sales of 300,000 units within four days of its release, while not seeing a U.S. release until February 14, 1995. It was the band's first album to debut at #1 on the Canadian Albums Chart. The album has been certified 7× platinum in Canada. Promotional tours for the album included stints touring with The Rolling Stones and Page and Plant. In the Netherlands, Day for Night peaked at #70.

== Saturday Night Live ==
The band appeared on Saturday Night Live in 1995, thanks in large part to the finagling of fellow Canadian and Kingston-area resident Dan Aykroyd. A fan of the band, Aykroyd appeared on the show just to introduce them, despite John Goodman being the host of the episode. The band performed two songs from Day for Night, "Grace, Too" and "Nautical Disaster".

== Critical reception ==
Professional ratings
Review scores
Source	Rating
AllMusic	3/5 stars
Rolling Stone	(favourable)

In Have Not Been the Same, the authors note that "the initial response was mixed" due to the "darkness" of the album and its stemming "from the unconscious." Although AllMusic.com's rating is a lukewarm 3 out of 5, the review calls the album's "signature lyrical mysteries... lush, but much more dark-spirited" than previous albums. "Day for Night stands on the minimalism of Downie's poignancy -- nothing is overproduced and the songs themselves are left alone to arrive on their own." In Chart, Jason Schneider wrote that this was the album that made The Tragically Hip more than "just a rock 'n' roll band... miraculously, the vast distances they had been absorbing for the previous five years merged with the equally limitless vistas of Gord Downie's imagination via a Daniel Lanois-inspired sonic canvas. Day For Night got inside the Canadian psyche in a terrifying way that simple nationalistic tall tales never could. The songs remain gloriously impenetrable, but their landscapes feel like home."

In ChartAttack's three Top 50 Canadian Albums of All Time polls, the album placed #37 in 1996, #13 in 2000 and #21 in 2005.

== Track listing ==
All songs were written by The Tragically Hip.

No.	Title	Length
1.	"Grace, Too"	5:34
2.	"Daredevil"	3:46
3.	"Greasy Jungle"	4:27
4.	"Yawning or Snarling"	4:54
5.	"Fire in the Hole"	3:16
6.	"So Hard Done By"	3:29
7.	"Nautical Disaster"	4:43
8.	"Thugs"	4:43
9.	"Inevitability of Death"	3:52
10.	"Scared"	5:08
11.	"An Inch an Hour"	3:21
12.	"Emergency"	3:34
13.	"Titanic Terrarium"	4:34
14.	"Impossibilium"	4:05
Total length:		59:26

== Credits ==
The Tragically Hip

- Gord Downie – lead vocals
- Rob Baker – lead guitar
- Paul Langlois – rhythm guitar, backing vocals
- Gord Sinclair – bass, backing vocals
- Johnny Fay – drums

Technical personnel

- The Tragically Hip – producer, engineer, mixing
- Greg Calbi – mastering
- Jim Herrington – photography
- Mark Howard – producer, engineer, mixing
- Andrew McLachlan – design
- Simon Andrew – drawing
- Mark Vreeken – co-producer, engineer, mixing

== Certifications ==
Region	Certification	Certified units/sales
Canada (Music Canada)	7× Platinum	700,000^{‡}
^{‡} Sales+streaming figures based on certification alone.
