= Trouble at the Henhouse =

1996 studio album by the Tragically Hip

Studio album by The Tragically Hip
- Released: May 7, 1996
- Studio: Kingsway, New Orleans; The Bathouse, Bath, Ontario
- Genre: Alternative rock
- Length: 52:34
- Label: MCA
- Producer: The Tragically Hip; Mark Vreeken

The Tragically Hip chronology
Day for Night (1994)	Trouble at the Henhouse (1996)	Live Between Us (1997)

Singles from Trouble at the Henhouse
- 1. "Ahead by a Century" Released: April 22, 1996; 2. "Gift Shop" Released: June 1996; 3. "700 Ft. Ceiling" Released: October 1996; 4. "Flamenco" Released: January 1997; 5. "Springtime in Vienna" Released: May 1997

Professional ratings
Review scores
Source	Rating
AllMusic	2/5 stars
The Encyclopedia of Popular Music	3/5 stars
MusicHound Rock: The Essential Album Guide	3.5/5 stars

Trouble at the Henhouse is the fifth studio album by Canadian rock band the Tragically Hip, released in 1996. It was their first album to be released simultaneously in Canada and the United States.

== Commercial and critical performance ==
Trouble at the Henhouse debuted at #1 on the Canadian Albums Chart and stayed there for four straight weeks. By March 1997, it had sold 650,000 units in Canada and has since been certified 8× platinum. The album peaked at No. 134 on the Billboard 200 and at No. 80 in the Netherlands.

The Encyclopedia of Popular Music deemed Trouble at the Henhouse "reliably melodic". The Washington Post wrote that "a surprisingly large number of these songs are more atmospheric than aggressive." Trouser Press wrote that "too much of Henhouse finds the Hip wallowing in meandering psychedelica, and too many of the slower songs ('Sherpa', 'Flamenco', 'Put It Off') sound too much alike." The Orlando Sentinel praised Gord Downie's ability to pen lyrics that "found beauty in the tiny wonders of life while exploring big questions of existence."

The record won Album of the Year and North Star Rock Album of the Year at the 1997 Juno Awards.

== Track listing ==
All songs written by the Tragically Hip.

No.	Title	Length
1.	"Gift Shop"	4:57
2.	"Springtime in Vienna"	4:38
3.	"Ahead by a Century"	3:43
4.	"Don't Wake Daddy"	5:08
5.	"Flamenco"	4:06
6.	"700 Ft. Ceiling"	3:40
7.	"Butts Wigglin'"	3:47
8.	"Apartment Song"	3:57
9.	"Coconut Cream"	3:21
10.	"Let's Stay Engaged"	4:53
11.	"Sherpa"	5:13
12.	"Put It Off"	5:11

== Personnel ==
The Tragically Hip

- Gord Downie – lead vocals
- Rob Baker – lead guitar
- Paul Langlois – rhythm guitar, backing vocals
- Gord Sinclair – bass, backing vocals
- Johnny Fay – drums, LinnDrum on "Ahead by a Century"

Additional musicians

- Peter Tuepah – Hammond organ
- Greg Runions – vibes

== Certifications ==
Region	Certification	Certified units/sales
Canada (Music Canada)	8× Platinum	800,000^{‡}
^{‡} Sales+streaming figures based on certification alone.
