= Flamenco (song) =

1997 single by the Tragically Hip

Single by The Tragically Hip

from the album Trouble at the Henhouse
- Released: January 1997
- Genre: Alternative rock
- Length: 4:06
- Label: MCA
- Songwriter: The Tragically Hip
- Producers: Mark Vreeken, The Tragically Hip

The Tragically Hip singles chronology
"700 Ft. Ceiling" (1996)	"Flamenco" (1997)	"Springtime in Vienna" (1997)

"Flamenco" is a song by Canadian rock group The Tragically Hip. It was released in January 1997 as the fourth single from their fifth studio album, Trouble at the Henhouse. The song peaked at number 12 on Canada's RPM Singles Chart.

== Charts ==
=== Weekly charts ===
Chart (1997)	Peak position
Canadian RPM Singles Chart	12
Canadian RPM Alternative 30	20

=== Year-end charts ===
Chart (1997)	Position
Canada Top Singles (RPM)	74
