= Canada Fitness Award Program =

Canadian national fitness test and evaluation program

The Canada Fitness Award Program was a national fitness test and evaluation program operated by the Government of Canada department Health and Welfare Canada from 1970 to 1992. It was a successor to the Centennial Athletic Awards Program, and was replaced by the Active Living Challenge program.

Millions of primary and secondary school children participated in the program. It was discontinued in part because it discouraged those it was intended to motivate.

== Establishment ==
The program was developed by Sport and Recreation Canada, a division of Health and Welfare Canada. It was established as a national fitness program by the Government of Canada, and began operating in September 1970. An official program launch ceremony was held in Lansdowne Park in Ottawa on 21 October 1970.

The program had several objectives:

- to promote health and fitness in Canadian youth
- to encourage youth to achieve higher levels of fitness
- to provide an "opportunity to participate in a continuing award plan"
- to recognize physical fitness achievements
- to increase public awareness of sports and recreation

It was intended to "create better attitudes towards personal fitness" and to build skills and aptitudes useful "beyond the formative years".

The directorate also operated the Canada Fitness Award Home Training Program, an "everyday physical fitness program", that was established in 1973.

== Fitness test ==
The fitness test consisted of six short duration events for 7- to 18-year-old individuals: the 50 yard run, the 300 yard run, flexed arm hangs, the shuttle run, speed situps, and the standing long jump. It was based on the fitness performance tests developed by the Canadian Association for Health, Physical Education and Recreation (CAHPER; now Physical and Health Education Canada) from a fitness study conducted in 1965.

The test components were designed to measure specific physical capabilities. The 50 yard run was a proxy for speed, the 300 yard run for cardiovascular efficiency, the flexed arm hang for arm and shoulder girdle strength, the shuttle run for speed and agility, the situps for strength and endurance of the abdominal muscles, and the standing long jump for the "explosive muscle power of leg extensions". The test was updated in 1973 to promote an individual's improvement against earlier performance in addition to the program awards, and the 300-yard run was eliminated.

In 1979, a review was conducted by CAHPER to update its Fitness Performance Test, financed by a $CAD100,000 grant from Loto Canada. Its primary purpose was to "establish normative data on the fitness performance of Canadian youths", which was used as the basis for the norms of the revision to the Canada Fitness Award Program. The Fitness Performance Test also incorporated height and weight data, which was lacking in the earlier version.

The revision introduced an endurance run to measure aerobic capacity, and converted the tests to use the International System of Units for consistency with metrication in Canada, which had begun with the 1971 establishment of the Metric Commission. The 50 yard run was replaced by the 50 metre dash, and the endurance run was set to 800 metres for 6- to 9-year-olds, 1,600 metres for 10- to 12-year-olds, and 2,400 metres for 13- to 17-year-olds. The situps were replaced by partial curlups, and the flexed-arm hang was replaced by push-ups. The new tests were included to measure stamina and flexibility.

The revisions were tested at 150 randomly selected schools throughout Canada by about 12,000 students, and the revised program was distributed to all schools in March 1980.

Most youth completed the test at school. Some were tested during touring summer exhibitions, such as at the Saskachimo Pioneer Days, which also had sport demonstration areas for parents. One of the two touring exhibitions appeared at the Canadian National Exhibition.

== Standards ==
The program defined national standards for four performance levels (Excellence, Gold, Silver, and Bronze) by age, sex, and activity, for participants from 6 to 17 years old. The standards were updated in the 1980 program revision.

For example, the standards for the endurance run established in the 1979 revision for the program were:

Endurance run, time by age and sex
Level	1,600 m	2,400 m					
Level	12	13	14	15	16	17	18
Females
Excellence	8:41	13:54	13:28	13:31	12:38	12:45	12:45
Gold	9:18	14:33	14:18	14:01	13:22	13:31	13:31
Silver	10:26	16:12	15:51	16:02	16:44	15:19	15:19
Bronze	12:46	18:59	18:51	18:58	18:37	18:53	18:53
Males
Excellence	7:41	11:31	10:43	10:23	10:08	10:08	10:08
Gold	8:04	11:49	11:09	10:50	10:42	10:32	10:32
Silver	8:46	12:51	12:16	11:51	11:22	11:10	11:10
Bronze	10:31	15:35	14:40	14:46	14:08	13:33	13:33

== Awards ==
All students received a participation pin, business-sized participation card (issued during the 1980s to those who did not score sufficiently well for Bronze status) or a certificate for participating in the test.

Fitness test results were recorded and submitted to Fitness and Sport Canada, which would review them and send awards and certificates to schools to distribute to participating students. The award received was based on the student's performance in the fitness test compared to the national standard. A bronze crest was awarded for an achievement averaging between 55% and 79% on four of the six events, a silver crest for an achievement between 80% and 94%, and a gold crest for an achievement between 95% and 100%. A student who achieved above 95% on all six tests received the Award of Excellence.

From inception to the end of the spring 1980 fitness tests, almost 8 million badges were awarded to the more than 14 million participants.

Perdita Felicien, a hurdler who established the Canadian women's record for the 100 metres hurdles in 2004, stated in an interview with Active for Life that she was inspired to join her school's track and field team because she had received an Award of Excellence in grade 3. She described it as "the first time I felt special in terms of my athletic ability".

== Results ==
The program's participation rate was 9% in its first year, and it rose to 28% by 1979. A review by CAHPER in 1980 found that the physical condition of boys and girls improved between 1965 and 1980, and that girls in 1980 performed better than boys of the same age in 1965. The times for the dash were notable, as the times recorded in the 1966 study were for the 50-yard dash, and the times for the 1980 study for the 50-metre (54.7 yd) dash.

The study results showed that by 1980 participants were receiving more awards because the fitness test was not as challenging to increasingly fit participants. Fitness improvements were partly attributed to "increases in compulsory physical education programs in primary schools", and partly to familiarity with the fitness test which resulted in "practice effects".

Results of the fitness test showed that participants performed poorly in exercises involving cardiovascular endurance. This was exacerbated by increasing inactivity starting in grade 9. The first version of the fitness test was criticised as being a "poor indicator of overall fitness" because it only measured strength.

The program was deemed to be "discouraging to those who needed the most encouragement" because of its focus on performance and awards. Intended to motivate young Canadians to lose weight and increase physical fitness, programs such as the Canada Fitness Award Program and ParticipACTION were found, in a study by Carla Rice in 2007, to facilitate "self-debasement and destructive eating and exercise practices" in girls deemed to be overweight.

== Adaptations ==
The test was used by the Royal Canadian Air Cadets as the basis for the Air Cadet Fitness Programme, and awards received in the Canada Fitness Award Program were eligible for credit in the Air Cadet Fitness Programme. Some of the norms defined for the program were used as the basis for the Physical Fitness Test of The President's Challenge in the United States, sponsored by the President's Council on Fitness, Sports, and Nutrition, and that for partial curlups is still used. The norms and data were also used to establish fitness standards for children with an intellectual disability.

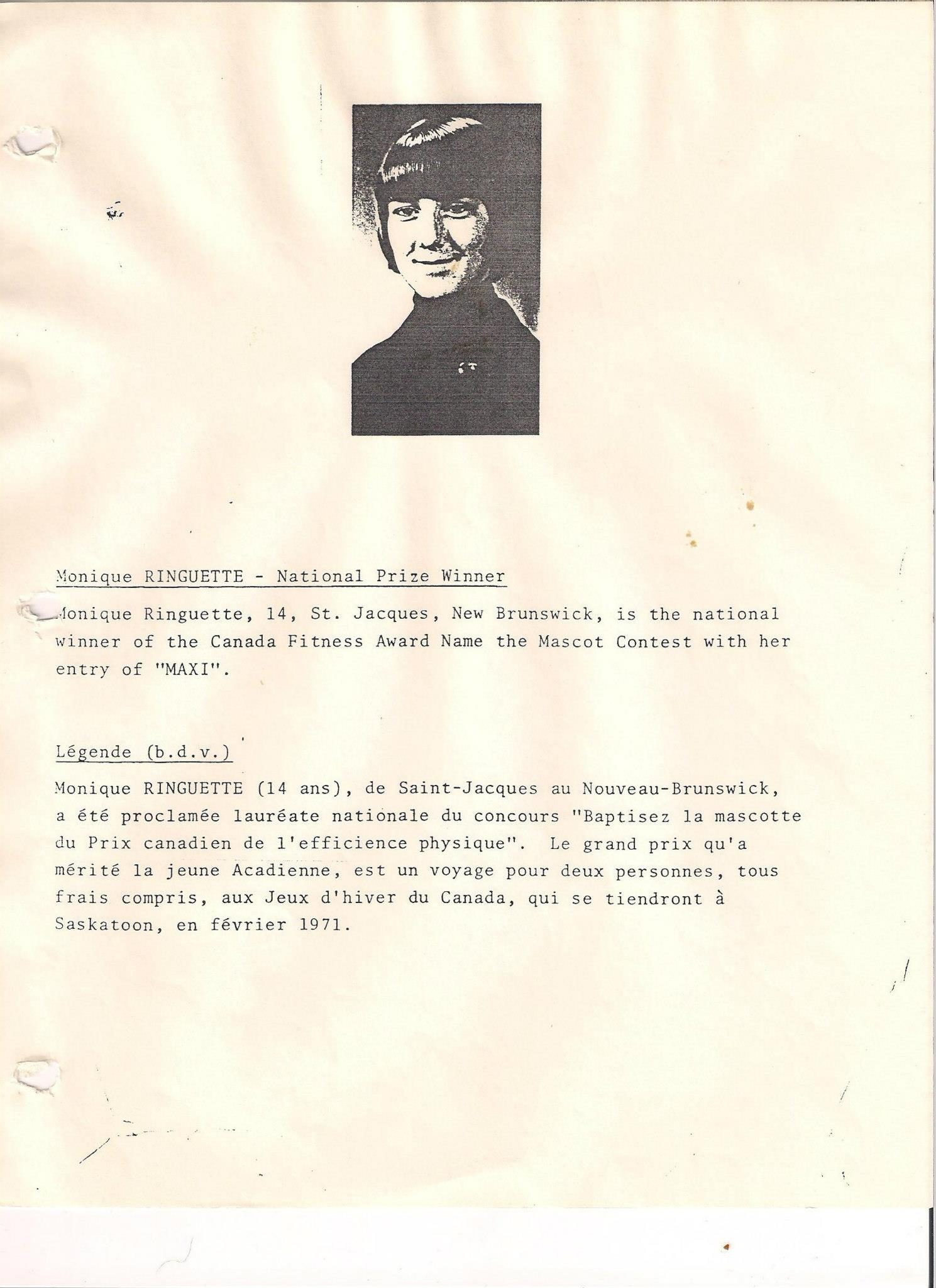
Ottawa

== Mascot and symbols ==
The mascot for the Canada Fitness Award Program was a raccoon, named Vicky the Racoon because of its "appeal to the young people". It was described as a "caricature of a playful raccoon". The Fitness and Amateur Sport Directorate of Health and Welfare Canada conducted a national "Name the Mascot" contest starting in May 1970 open to students between the ages of 7 and 17. Each school in Canada was sent entry forms, which contained a space for the mascot's name, the student's name, and an explanation of the program's importance to youth or the reason for the chosen name.

There were 131,745 entries submitted by the 20 June deadline, which surprised the contest administrators as there had been a rotating strike of postal workers at Canada Post. The winning suggestion "Maxi" was submitted by 14-year-old Monique Ringuette of Saint-Jacques, New Brunswick, who received an all-expenses paid trip to the 1971 Canada Winter Games in Saskatoon for herself and a chaperone. The national runner-up received $200 of sports equipment, provincial runners-up received $100 of sports equipment, and consolation winners received Fitness and Amateur Sports Directorate branded tote bags.

The mascot was prominent in the national introduction of the Canada Fitness Award Program in September 1970.

The crests awarded to youth featured a symbol based on the triskelion.

== Popular culture ==
Next to your comrades in the national fitness program
Caught in some eternal flexed-arm hang
Droppin' to the mat in a fit of laughter
Showed no patience, tolerance or restraint

— "Fireworks", The Tragically Hip, 1998

The fitness test administered via the program is mentioned in the song "Fireworks" by The Tragically Hip.

The shuttle run features in the Corner Gas episode "Physical Credit", in which Oscar coaches Davis to improve his physical fitness, claiming the Canada Fitness Award Program to be "the last great thing the country ever achieved."
