= Fireworks (The Tragically Hip song) =

Single by The Tragically Hip

from the album Phantom Power
- Released: November 1998
- Genre: Rock
- Length: 3:56
- Label: Universal
- Songwriter(s): Rob Baker; Gordon Downie; Johnny Fay; Paul Langlois; Gord Sinclair
- Producer(s): Steve Berlin

The Tragically Hip singles chronology
"Something On" (1998)	"Fireworks" (1998)	"Bobcaygeon" (1999)

"Fireworks" is a song by Canadian rock band The Tragically Hip. It was released in November 1998 as the third single from their sixth studio album, Phantom Power. The song was very successful in Canada, peaking at number 9 on Canada's RPM Singles chart.

== Content ==
The song makes references to the 1972 Summit Series (particularly the famous game-winning goal of the series), hockey legend Bobby Orr, and the fitness test administered via the Canada Fitness Award Program.

The narrator appears to be a middle-aged individual, speaking to an unnamed spouse about the history of their relationship. This relationship began on the last night of the Summit Series, and continued through a time-period partly contemporaneous with the remaining years of the Cold War.

The underlying theme of the recollections is that the couple's relationship has managed to survive for a significant number of years, unaffected by, and perhaps even serving as a defense against, external pressures.

== Charts ==
Chart (1999)	Peak position
Canadian RPM Singles Chart	9

=== Year-end charts ===
Chart (1999)	Position
Canada Top Singles (RPM)	80

== Pop culture ==
The song was featured on the season 5 episode 19 of Corner Gas entitled "Final Countdown."
