= List of Corner Gas episodes =

The following is a list of episodes for the Canadian comedy series, Corner Gas. The program premiered on January 22, 2004 and aired its final episode on April 13, 2009. During its run, 107 episodes of Corner Gas aired.

== Series overview ==
Season	Episodes	Originally released	
Season	Episodes	First released	Last released
1	13	January 22, 2004	April 28, 2004
2	18	October 5, 2004	March 28, 2005
3	19	September 19, 2005	March 20, 2006
4	19	September 18, 2006	March 12, 2007
5	19	September 24, 2007	April 21, 2008
6	19	October 13, 2008	April 13, 2009
Film		November 25, 2014	

== Episodes ==
=== Season 1 (2004) ===
No. overall	No. in season	Title	Directed by	Written by	Original release date	Prod. code	Can. viewers (millions)
1	1	"Ruby Reborn"	David Storey	Brent Butt & Mark Farrell	January 22, 2004	1-01	1.21
Lacey Burrows (Gabrielle Miller), a big-city girl from Toronto, moves into the small community of Dog River to run her late aunt's coffee shop. When she makes changes to the shop, the perpetually unemployed Hank Yarbo (Fred Ewanuick) begins to protest. Next door at Corner Gas, station manager Brent Leroy (Brent Butt) starts a video rental service at his gas station, much to the disapproval of his father, Oscar (Eric Peterson), who previously ran the station. Meanwhile, police officers Davis Quinton (Lorne Cardinal) and Karen Pelly (Tara Spencer-Nairn) disagree on their patrol car numbers. Guest stars: Mark Farrell
2	2	"Tax Man"	David Storey	Brent Butt & Mark Farrell	January 29, 2004	1-02	1.06
When a tax man comes to audit the Corner Gas business records, Brent's dad Oscar and friend Hank immediately plot revenge by devising a foolproof plan to humiliate the auditor. Unfortunately for Hank and Oscar, Emma's excellent record-keeping throws the whole clockwork operation into chaos and Hank learns not to carry out humiliation plans after drinking. Meanwhile, Lacey's big-city approach to selling coffee does not fly with the locals. Guest stars: Dan Matheson, Kevin McDonald (as the tax man) (A Tax Man!)
3	3	"Pilates Twist"	David Storey	Mark Farrell & Paul Mather	February 4, 2004	1-03	1.14
Lacey offers "free" Pilates classes to the people of Dog River but they're strangely hostile to the idea. Then Brent and Hank's fashion worlds collide: Dog River's not big enough for two sharp-dressed men, so Hank devises a way to ensure they never steal each other's fashion thunder again. Meanwhile, Brent's dad Oscar takes steps to avoid being buried in a cheap-looking coffin. Guest stars: Paul Mather
4	4	"Oh Baby!"	Henry Sarwer-Foner	Brent Butt & Andrew Carr	February 11, 2004	1-04	1.10
Trying to impress Lacey, Brent agrees to babysit Wanda's troubled six-year-old, Tanner, and the town takes an unusual interest in the outcome, gambling on what happens to him. Brent uses his time with Tanner to develop his nurturing side but with painful results. Eventually Lacey does come to Brent's rescue, but not for the reason he thinks. Meanwhile, Oscar does his best not to destroy the gas station in Brent's absence, and Hank deals with his own disturbing memory of babysitting Tanner.
5	5	"Grad 68"	Rob King	Mark Farrell & Paul Mather	February 18, 2004	1-05	1.13
A poorly spray-painted "Grad 68" on the Dog River water tower has been an eyesore for years. But when rookie cop Karen makes it her mission to crack the graffiti cold case, she finds many of the locals united in a mysterious conspiracy of silence. Meanwhile, Brent throws Dog River into chaos when he tries to end the confusion over the gas station's new bathroom signs; and when the town newspaper rejects Lacey's column she becomes desperate to be published, especially after hearing the paper usually takes anyone. Guest stars: Julie Stewart
6	6	"World's Biggest Thing"	David Storey	Brent Butt	February 25, 2004	1-06	1.21
Realizing that other prairie towns have attracted tourists by erecting giant statues of eggs, moose, and magpies, Dog River decides to put up its own big tourist magnet--the question is, what? Finally the mayor's grandmother comes up with the perfect landmark; its name has an unfortunate double meaning, but who can argue with the mayor's grandmother? Meanwhile, some head cheese helps Oscar stop a lovestruck admirer from ruining his marriage.
7	7	"All My Ex's Live in Toronto"	Henry Sarwer-Foner	Mark Farrell	March 3, 2004	1-07	1.34
When Lacey's ex-fiance from Toronto visits, the people of Dog River take matters into their own hands to protect Lacey from her past. Unfortunately the town's crack system for tracking intruders has a few glitches. Meanwhile Emma uses strong-arm tactics to get her husband to the doctor. The town's policewoman, Karen, gets to know her billy stick, and just about everyone gets a tour of the police station's new interrogation room. Guest stars: Peter Oldring
8	8	"Cousin Carl"	Rob King	Chris Finn	March 10, 2004	1-08	1.16
Brent's successful cousin Carl, now working in England, comes back to Dog River and everyone seems to love him except for Brent. After a while, even Brent fears his loathing of Carl might be misplaced. Thankfully at the town's talent show, Brent's fears of misplaced dislike are put to rest when Carl proves himself less than perfect. Meanwhile Davis' love of puppetry turns sour after the talent night, and Oscar finally figures out a way to make money from his old beer bottles. Guest stars: Mike Wilmot (as Carl), Dale Wilson (as The Man From Glad)
9	9	"Cell Phone"	Rob De Lint	Paul Mather	March 17, 2004	1-09	1.05
When Brent gets a new cell phone, Davis is determined to keep up with him technologically. Meanwhile, Lacey tries to join the town's exclusive Chamber of Commerce by proving to Dog River that she's got community spirit. When she learns that one of the town's historic landmarks could be torn down, she jumps into action, not realizing there might be a good reason for it. Meanwhile, over at the bar, Hank wonders what actually goes on in the "Chamber" of Commerce and Oscar develops a passion for stuffed bunnies.
10	10	"Comedy Night"	Mark Farrell	Brent Butt & Mark Farrell & Paul Mather	March 24, 2004	1-10	1.11
Brent develops a grudge for an out-of-town comedian who performs at a comedy night in Dog River, but Hank, starstruck with the guy, arranges to be the emcee for the night. Unfortunately Hank gets carried away after Lacey gives him a crash course in heckler management. Meanwhile, Dog River's women's book club expands its reading list when they recruit a man. Guest stars: Colin Mochrie, Peter Kelamis
11	11	"Hook, Line and Sinker"	David Storey	Ian McLean & Paul Mather & Mark Farrell	March 31, 2004	1-11	1.307
To drum up business, Brent gets a sign to put up catchy slogans outside the gas station and coffee shop, but Lacey is not crazy about his pithy catchphrases, like "eat at the Ruby and get gas", or "come for the oil change, stay for the grease". Meanwhile Brent and Emma worry about Oscar's memory after Oscar keeps misplacing his can of Alphagetti. Finally, Karen is forced to go on a fishing trip alone with Hank when Davis claims to have to see an "aroma-therapist", which turns the town on end after seeing the outcome on the sign outside the station. Guest stars: Farley Flex, Jake Gold, Sass Jordan, Zach Werner, Pamela Wallin
12	12	"Face Off"	Rob De Lint	Brent Butt & Andrew Carr	April 21, 2004	1-12	1.12
As they kick off their season against a rival team from Stonewood, the local Dog River hockey team finds itself at a crossroads. Brent is a great goalie and is being taken for granted by his teammates, so when an offer from the rival team comes his way, he has to seriously consider his options. Meanwhile the other players are having trouble scoring and might need to take some advice from an unlikely hockey expert. Then team superfan Emma learns the hard way never to mix cars, husband, and hammer on game night. Guest stars: Jamie Hutchinson, Darren Dutchyshen, Jennifer Hedger
13	13	"I Love Lacey"	David Storey	Brent Butt & Mark Farrell & Paul Mather	April 28, 2004	1-13	1.10
The Dog River gang hit a few snags on their way to the Grey Cup in Regina: Emma and Wanda get physical with a cashier while shopping at their favourite store; Oscar and Hank visit Oscar's crazy old buddy who's not quite the partner he used to be; Karen and Davis try to buy tickets from a scalper; Lacey discovers that getting roadside assistance is not that simple when you are traveling with a guy who runs a gas station; and Brent realizes there may be more to his relationship with Lacey than he thought.

=== Season 2 (2004–05) ===
No. overall	No. in season	Title	Directed by	Written by	Original release date	Prod. code	Can. viewers (millions)
14	1	"The Brent Effect"	David Storey	Brent Butt & Mark Farrell	October 5, 2004	2-01	N/A
After flirting with romance on the Grey Cup trip, Lacey confronts Brent but misjudges his take on the relationship--and the town's. Meanwhile, Karen launches a full investigation after reports of gunfire around town...and discovers it may be an inside job; and Emma's on the warpath when the money she was saving for a new blender disappears and Oscar turns up with his latest toy.
15	2	"Wedding Card"	Rob De Lint	Mark Farrell & Paul Mather	October 12, 2004	2-02	N/A
Brent is shocked to find out his parents never married, until an unlikely wedding planner talks Oscar and Emma into a splashy nuptial ceremony. Meanwhile, Hank disputes Brent's ownership of a Darryl Sittler rookie card he claims he won when they were kids; and Lacey tackles helping Oscar with an embarrassing problem he's not aware he has. Guest stars: Darryl Sittler
16	3	"Smell of Freedom"	Rob De Lint	Paul Mather & Kevin White	October 19, 2004	2-03	1.64
Davis regains his sense of smell in a fortuitous freak accident, and it's a beautiful new world...until he gets a whiff of his fellow officer. Meanwhile, Brent realizes how little he knows about his fellow Dog Riverites; and Scrabble champ Lacey is challenged by an unlikely – some would say inarticulate – wordsmith.
17	4	"Whataphobia"	David Storey	Brent Butt & Mark Farrell	October 26, 2004	2-04	N/A
Lacey's birthday party is ruined when her deepest fear reveals itself, but it turns out everyone in town has his or her own unique fear--except Wanda. Brent and Hank determine to discover what freaks her out. Meanwhile, Oscar tries to prove to Emma that he can cook, and Hank and Lacey prove to be bad liars.
18	5	"Lost and Found"	Rob De Lint	Paul Mather & Kevin White	November 2, 2004	2-05	N/A
With some gruntwork ahead at his cousin's farm, Hank is desperate to call in a favour from Brent to help him, but Brent owes him no favours and Brent will make sure it stays that way, even enlisting Lacey's help. He learns that one must choose his allies carefully. Meanwhile, Karen drives everybody crazy with her new hacky-sack and Oscar is thrilled to find a perfectly good pair of pants in the ditch.
19	6	"Poor Brent"	David Storey	Mark Farrell & Paul Mather	November 9, 2004	2-06	N/A
Brent enters into the final stage of manhood by buying a big-screen television. He knows this sort of thing can attract a lot of envy, so he's surprised to find he's suddenly the object of pity among his friends. Lacey makes the mistake of buying some handmade jewelry from Wanda, realizing you can put a price on friendship; Oscar and Emma engage in a battle of petty revenge after Oscar criticizes Emma for never putting the lid back on the sugar bowl. Guest stars: Lloyd Robertson
20	7	"Hero Sandwich"	David Storey	Brent Butt & Andrew Carr	November 23, 2004	2-07	N/A
Lacey learns what it means to be a victim of success when she invents a new sandwich that becomes a little too popular. Then a spike in traffic convinces the town's mayor to install a traffic light. To pay for it he orders Karen and Davis to crack down on jaywalkers. Hank and Oscar engage in civil disobedience as Brent tries to broker a deal with the pro-traffic light faction to bring peace back to the street of Dog River. Finally, Wanda is excited to get a tattoo until Emma offers to help her design it.
21	8	"Security Cam"	Trent Carlson	Brent Butt & Mark Farrell	November 30, 2004	2-08	N/A
When Brent installs a security camera at Corner Gas, he is not prepared for the private moments caught on tape. Two unlikely conspirators hatch a plan to deal with the camera, and Hank sees the chance to fulfill a lifelong dream when Davis gets a new stun gun. Meanwhile Oscar and Emma's romantic getaway to a fancy resort convinces them there's no place like home.
22	9	"Bingo Night"	Rob De Lint	Brent Butt & Andrew Carr	December 7, 2004	2-09	N/A
At bingo night, Wanda steps in after the regular bingo caller takes a tumble. She's a hit with everyone except Emma who takes drastic steps to restore her winning streak. Meanwhile, Lacey learns that her good old-fashioned home cooking cannot compete with the chemically-preserved "road cookies" Brent sells at Corner Gas; and Karen is temporarily suspended from the police force and spends her days hanging out with Brent, leaving Hank to wonder what his role is. Guest stars: Frank Adamson
23	10	"Mosquito Time"	Trent Carlson	Mark Farrell & Paul Mather	December 14, 2004	2–10	1.31
Mosquitoes hit the town hard and only Hank seems unaffected. Lacey finally gets a chance to participate in a genuine Dog River activity by contributing to the town's less-than-impressive time capsule. Oscar goes back to work at Corner Gas which irritates Wanda, puzzles Emma, and sends Brent running to the Ruby, where Lacey's new serve-yourself coffee carafes prove troublesome.
24	11	"Hurry Hard"	David Storey	Brent Butt & Mark Farrell	January 17, 2005	2–11	N/A
The Leroy family has long been a proud and ineffective curling dynasty but this year a schism in the ranks has Brent and Oscar skipping different rinks. Then when a local senior's hip replacement creates a shortage of female curlers, Lacey finds herself the hottest rookie prospect in the league. Meanwhile Karen is put in charge of safeguarding the famed curling trophy — the Clavet Cup — which turns out to be harder than she thought. Guest stars: Randy Ferbey, Dave Nedohin
25	12	"An American in Saskatchewan"	David Storey	Mark Farrell & Paul Mather	January 24, 2005	2–12	N/A
Hank is asked to be Dog River's goodwill ambassador and show an American tourist around, but he's not the best choice and Brent is called in. A new automated teller machine at the liquor store draws a loyal following, (but not for the machine or insurance) leaving Lacey to wonder where all her customers have gone. Emma goes power-crazy after being nominated to be "leader of the ATM people". Attempting to learn French, Karen tries to immerse herself in Dog River's rich but non-existent francophone community. Guest stars: Mark McKinney
26	13	"Pandora's Wine"	Jeff Beesley	Paul Mather & Kevin White	February 7, 2005	2–13	N/A
Lacey brings nice wine to dinner at the Leroys', which opens a door to the wine world that should never have been opened. Meanwhile, winning the lottery turns Hank's life upside-down; and despite warnings from Brent and Wanda, Karen talks Davis into getting new shoes.
27	14	"Doc Small"	Jeff Beesley	Mark Farrell & Paul Mather	February 14, 2005	2–14	N/A
Lacey gets the job of convincing a good-looking young doctor to set up shop in town, but the doctor turns out to be a small-town hick. Meanwhile, Hank sets off a chain reaction of house-swapping when he needs a place to crash while his house is getting fixed; and Brent thinks he's stuck with a counterfeit $100 bill. Guest stars: Aurora Browne
28	15	"Rock On!"	Wendy Hopkins	Brent Butt & Chris Finn	February 21, 2005	2–15	1.66
Brent, Hank, and Wanda resurrect their old high-school rock band Thunderface. The local bar owner is thrilled but not for the reasons the band thinks. Meanwhile Davis takes an unusual interest in Oscar's claim that a famous country/western singer stole his song. And despite Emma's efforts to stop her, civic-minded Lacey uncovers the dark secret behind Dog River's name. This has been claimed to be Brent Butt's favorite episode. Guest stars: Jack Duffy, Colin James, The Tragically Hip
29	16	"Air Show"	Wendy Hopkins	Paul Mather & Kevin White	March 14, 2005	2–16	N/A
A big airshow is on nearby and the people of Dog River are very excited. But Lacey's breach of airshow protocol has many in town upset. Thankfully with the help of the Snowbirds, Lacey almost manages to make things right. Meanwhile, business at Brent's gas station hits an unexpected snag while Hank's new corn stand scheme exceeds all expectations. And after a rash of vandalism, Karen and Davis take to the streets on bikes to do some face-to-face community policing, although Karen is oddly reluctant. Guest stars: The Snowbirds
30	17	"Slow Pitch"	David Storey	Brent Butt & Andrew Carr	March 21, 2005	2–17	1.41
With a little help from Oscar, a friendly slow-pitch game in the local beer league gets a lot less friendly. Armed with an array of secret pitches, Brent is ready to lob his team to victory. But the team could be disqualified if 10th member Lacey does not make it to the diamond in time. Meanwhile Davis and Karen are only too happy to turn a blind eye to drinking on the team's bench, but they have a harder time ignoring an act of vandalism that they accidentally committed.
31	18	"Harvest Dance"	David Storey	Brent Butt & Mark Farrell	March 28, 2005	2–18	N/A
Lacey has just about had it when she finds out about yet another local function that no one invited her to — the Harvest Dance. Is it time for her to stop trying to fit in to Dog River? Meanwhile, Hank falls for highway worker Heather, but theirs becomes a forbidden love when Dog Riverites discover something unacceptable about Heather. Finally Brent and Oscar scramble for reasons not to eat Emma's dreaded jelly salad.

=== Season 3 (2005–06) ===
No. overall	No. in season	Title	Directed by	Written by	Original release date	Prod. code	Can. viewers (millions)
32	1	"Dress for Success"	David Storey	Brent Butt & Andrew Carr	September 19, 2005	3-01	1.54
Brent starts behaving differently when Wanda wears a skirt to work. Feeling empowered, she tests the limits of her feminine charm, only to find out Brent's new attitude toward her may not be motivated by her clothes. Meanwhile Oscar and Hank invest imaginary money in the stock market and try not to lose their imaginary shirts; Emma comes to the rescue when Lacey's dishwasher breaks down. Guest stars: Pat Bolland
33	2	"Key to the Future"	David Storey	Brent Butt & Mark Farrell	September 26, 2005	3-02	N/A
Hank becomes convinced he's psychic when he has dreams that vaguely predict the future. Wanda and Brent are skeptical but not above having a little fun with his powers...until one of the predictions comes true for Wanda. Meanwhile, Lacey decides to fix the town's pothole under Oscar's (mis)guidance; and Davis and Karen learn the hard way about the one place to never leave their keys.
34	3	"Dog River Vice"	Rob De Lint	Brent Butt & Paul Mather	October 3, 2005	3-03	N/A
When Emma gives Brent flak over his coffee drinking, he vows to quit cold turkey if she quits knitting. As Brent struggles in a caffeine-free world, Emma takes up a new pastime with Oscar to counter her knitting-needle withdrawal, but the cure may be worse than the addiction. Meanwhile, Davis and Karen start a ride-along program that becomes a little too popular; and Hank is at the mercy of his new electronic organizer. Guest stars: Ben Mulroney
35	4	"Will and Brent"	Rob De Lint	Brent Butt & Kevin White	October 10, 2005	3-04	1.58
Oscar and Emma become suspicious of Brent when he encourages them to get a will. Brent does damage control, but not before his parents make sure Brent's inheritance is more punishment than reward after Hank makes it worse. Meanwhile, the town takes a surprising shine to Karen and Davis' drinking-and-driving checkstops and Lacey's new bulletin board is enough to drive customers to drink.
36	5	"The Littlest Yarbo"	Jeff Beesley	Brent Butt & Mark Farrell	October 17, 2005	3-05	N/A
When a dog finds Hank's sunglasses, he's sure that it's TV's Littlest Hobo, the fictional dog whose mission it was to help those in trouble. Hank tries to prove his theory, but discovers that he's not smart enough to outsmart the smartest of dogs. Meanwhile, Brent waffles on the designs for the new travel mugs for Corner Gas and The Ruby; and Davis and Karen's status in Dog River is threatened when two firefighters named David and Carol arrive. Guest stars: Shane Bellegarde, Brooke D'Orsay, Gage the Dog
37	6	"Mail Fraud"	Jeff Beesley	Brent Butt & Kevin White	October 24, 2005	3-06	N/A
Every year Brent takes a vacation from Corner Gas. Most envy the way he travels the world on a shoestring budget, but his unique way of globetrotting unnerves Lacey so much that she interrupts his trip, breaking the cardinal rule about his time away. Meanwhile, Karen is determined that Davis will bring more than just napkins to the annual potluck; and Oscar's experiments with email raise alarms at cyberspace central.
38	7	"Fun Run"	David Storey	Mark Farrell & Kevin White	October 31, 2005	3-07	N/A
Lacey and Wanda start a running group to train for a 10k fun run, but when Brent joins he shows the other members how to run, race, and relax all at once: it might not be much exercise, but it has Lacey eating dust in the big race. Meanwhile, Hank takes his new crossing-guard job too seriously; and everyone in town treats Oscar differently when he scams handicap plates for his car. Guest stars: Jann Arden, Paul Martin
39	8	"Trees a Crowd"	Mark Farrell	Brent Butt & Paul Mather	November 7, 2005	3-08	1.53
Brent and Hank stumble across their old treehouse, but the new kids who have taken it over intimidate them into action: they wage war to reclaim their fort, forgetting that acting like a child gets you treated like one. Meanwhile, Wanda escapes Davis' police custody with surprising ease; Lacey sucks at Kung-Fu; and Oscar's in denial when an old friend shows up with lust in her eyes. Guest stars: Shirley Douglas
40	9	"Picture Perfect"	Mark Farrell	Brent Butt & Mark Farrell	November 14, 2005	3-09	1.58
When people make fun of Brent's old-fashioned camera, he decides to go digital. But going high-tech earns him little respect, especially when he forgets to read his new camera's instruction manual. Meanwhile, everyone teams up for a trivia showdown at the hotel; and Oscar's hatred of lawn ornaments comes back to haunt him when a ceramic gnome takes on a life of its own. Guest stars: Ralph Goodale
41	10	"Safety First"	Rob De Lint	Mark Farrell & Paul Mather	November 21, 2005	3–10	N/A
Karen must come up with a colouring book about bike safety, but she can't draw. That's where Brent comes in. She can't write either; that's where Wanda comes in. Before long, artistic visions clash, the biggest casualty being kids' bike safety. Meanwhile, when Hank learns he's not a Virgo but a Libra, changing his life to match his horoscope means becoming the town's accountant; and Davis and Oscar get a taste of life on the Leroys' rooftop.
42	11	"Hair Loss"	David Storey	Brent Butt & Andrew Carr	November 28, 2005	3–11	N/A
When Lacey learns that Brent is paranoid about hair loss, she promises to help, but her solution makes him smell weird. Meanwhile, Wanda buys a lamp at an estate auction and sparks a heated standoff at Corner Gas: she's not the only one who covets the ugly antique. Meanwhile, Oscar develops a hunger for Lacey's magic tricks at the Ruby; and Hank shows off his vast inexperience at fixing appliances.
43	12	"Ruby Newsday"	Rob De Lint	Mark Farrell & Andrew Carr	December 5, 2005	3–12	N/A
Lacey starts a coffee-shop newsletter and invites Brent to draw the cartoons. Brent agrees, but Davis and Karen see his cartoons as personal attacks, and his follow-up cartoon only worsens things. Meanwhile, Hank comes up with a way for Lacey to rake in more tips at the Ruby, but he bolts to the competition when he's cut out of the profits; and Oscar's childhood dream of being a paperboy becomes Emma's nightmare. Guest stars: Lorne Calvert, Vicki Gabereau
44	13	"Merry Gasmas"	David Storey	Brent Butt & Mark Farrell & Paul Mather & Kevin White	December 12, 2005	3–13	2.20
Brent must cope with Emma's plans for a traditional Christmas. Lacey decides to head home to Toronto but the weather forces her to take a scenic route that won't get her there. Meanwhile, the holiday spirit moves Hank to organize a gift drive for a needy family who seem oddly unappreciative; and Wanda struggles to get her hands on the season's hottest toy...again and again and again. Guest stars: Gavin Crawford, Roman Danylo, Dan Redican
45	14	"Friend of a Friend"	David Storey	Mark Farrell & Paul Mather	January 30, 2006	3–14	N/A
Lacey's friend Connie comes to Dog River and everyone's surprised by how rude she is. Lacey thinks the town always treats outsiders with suspicion, so Hank sets out to prove it. Meanwhile, Wanda and Brent try to keep a Corner Gas rewards-card program from spiraling out of control; and Davis thinks Karen would make a bad undercover cop despite being a bad one himself. Guest star: Amy Price-Francis
46	15	"Block Party"	David Storey	Paul Mather & Kevin White	February 20, 2006	3–15	1.46
Hank wants to pay tribute to Dog River's 100th birthday by building a scale model of the town using Lego blocks. Like any artist he demands perfection, but when his building-material supply dries up, he takes desperate measures in the name of art. Meanwhile, the town learns that Karen once excelled in a sport nobody knew existed; and Wanda's campaign to keep people from celebrating her birthday proves too successful.
47	16	"Physical Credit"	Jeff Beesley	Mark Farrell & Paul Mather	February 27, 2006	3–16	1.46
Brent and Lacey battle for the title of who can best keep a secret with Karen stuck in the crossfire. Wanda is angry and perplexed when she is turned down for a credit card, after a company rats on her, especially when she finds out Hank was approved for the same card. Tired of Davis bothering her with Hardy Boys books, Karen gives them to Oscar and has him give them back only if he whips Davis into physical peak; at least according to the standards of the Canada Fitness Award Program. Guest stars: Ken Read
48	17	"Telescope Trouble"	Jeff Beesley	Kevin White & Paul Mather	March 6, 2006	3–17	1.65
When the hydraulic door-closer at Corner Gas breaks, Brent takes Lacey's advice and hires the best door guy in the business to fix it. The repairs go well, but when Brent tries to fine-tune the new device on his own, he earns the scorn of a true professional. Meanwhile, Wanda goes to great lengths to protect her new telescope and witness astronomical history while Oscar and Emma drive everyone crazy when they borrow an RV and camp in some unusual places.
49	18	"Bean There"	Brent Butt	Paul Mather & Andrew Carr	March 13, 2006	3–18	1.18
Dog River's children's play park is falling apart, easily making it the most dangerous place in town. So Brent suggests a novel fundraiser to fix the place up: a jelly-bean-jar contest. The idea takes off, but when those in charge start cutting corners, an innocent jar of candy raises more anger than money. Meanwhile, a convoy of truckers passing through town has Davis reliving trucker/cop movies of yesteryear, and Hank drags Wanda into a web of lies when he joins an exclusive club for people who own Lamborghinis.
50	19	"Road Worthy"	David Storey	Mark Farrell & Paul Mather	March 20, 2006	3–19	1.78
Lacey seeks Brent's 'guy knowledge' to help her buy a car while Davis and Karen experiment with snack foods to avoid stereotypes and expanding waistlines. Wanda takes the brunt of Emma's criticism for an anniversary gift she got from Oscar when Wanda did not know Emma hated what she suggested.

=== Season 4 (2006–07) ===
No. overall	No. in season	Title	Directed by	Written by	Original release date	Prod. code	Can. viewers (millions)
51	1	"Hair Comes the Judge"	David Storey	Brent Butt	September 18, 2006	4-01	1.18
Brent accepts the offer of a haircut from Karen, only to find out that Emma is territorial about who he receives them from. Hank promises to stain Lacey's deck but does not, forcing Lacey to get Wanda's help to settle it. And Davis is after Oscar to replace his muffler, which is as loud as it is old. Guest stars Jake Edwards
52	2	"Dog River Dave"	David Storey	Mark Farrell	September 25, 2006	4-02	1.22
When a morning-radio DJ starts impersonating Brent on his show, Brent tries to prove to the people of Dog River – and especially Oscar — that it's not actually him. Lacey's upset when her new delivery service proves more popular than she'd like. And Davis and Karen find out that their work-to-rule campaign is a lot more work than they thought. Guest stars: Cindy Klassen
53	3	"Two Degrees of Separation"	Rob De Lint	Paul Mather	October 2, 2006	4-03	1.31
Hank installs a new digital thermostat for Oscar and Emma, only to be drawn into their battle over the perfect temperature for the room. Karen makes Lacey regret disobeying a local yield sign. And when Davis puts up a security height sticker by the door of Corner Gas, Brent makes it his mission to figure out how tall Wanda is.
54	4	"Just Brent and His Shadow"	Rob De Lint	Kevin White	October 9, 2006	4-04	1.33
Brent and Lacey mentor a couple of high-school students in a job shadow program only to prove they are less than inspirational leaders. Hank gets a fondue pot and inadvertently upsets Davis, an avid fondue enthusiast. And Emma, unnerved by a friend's recent divorce, decides to be nicer to Oscar with unexpected consequences for Wanda.
55	5	"Demolition"	Jeff Beesley	Andrew Carr	October 16, 2006	4-05	1.48
Hank and Brent's plan to tear down a local barn is complicated when Oscar insists on getting involved. Davis, determined to become the local paper's "Newsmaker of the Year," hires Wanda to take photos of him on the job. And Lacey is frustrated at Emma for having to continually re-manicure her nails. Guest stars: Adrienne Clarkson
56	6	"Jail House"	Jeff Beesley	Brent Butt	October 23, 2006	4-06	1.49
Trying to raise money for charity, Karen locks Davis in the jail cell and will not let him out until she has raised a thousand dollars – a challenge made no less difficult when Hank insists on keeping Davis company. Brent resists Lacey's attempt to "spruce up" Corner Gas, and Wanda will not let a lack of know-how interfere with her attempt to fix Oscar and Emma's toilet. Guest stars: Mike Holmes
57	7	"I, Witness"	Mark Farrell	Mark Farrell	October 30, 2006	4-07	1.26
Following an almost-near-death experience, Hank decides to live out his lifelong dream of becoming a "professional" rodeo clown. Karen dreads giving a speech for the local police association on the subject of eyewitness testimony – and Wanda's help is not helping. Meanwhile Oscar gives up on being Emma's bridge partner, leaving an unsuspecting Lacey to take his place.
58	8	"Blog River"	Mark Farrell	Paul Mather	November 6, 2006	4-08	1.24
Brent regrets convincing Hank to start an online blog when he realizes that he's actually going to have to read it. And when Lacey gets bummed out over a friend's recent success, the food at the Ruby goes downhill. To take Lacey's mind off it, Emma invites her to a BBQ but things turn ugly when Lacey takes on Oscar on in a friendly game of horseshoes. Meanwhile, Wanda gives Davis a hand with his taxes with expensive results. Guest stars: Ivan Fecan
59	9	"Outside Joke"	David Storey	Brent Butt & Kevin White	November 13, 2006	4-09	1.33
When the police department gets a new global positioning unit, Brent realizes that Corner Gas may not actually be within the town of Dog River. Soon, Brent's the outsider and Lacey is relishing her new "insider" status. Meanwhile Hank's new job as the garbage man has Oscar and Emma feeling privacy-invaded. And Karen tries to coach Davis in the ways of a proper practical joke.
60	10	"One Piano, Four Hands"	Jeff Beesley	Robert Sheridan	November 20, 2006	4–10	1.39
Wanda's competitive nature comes out when she and Davis both sign up for piano lessons with Emma. Brent and Oscar do battle over a new air pump at Corner Gas. And when Lacey breaks her arm, Hank tries to help her through the recovery process, while everyone in town seems eager to sign her cast – except, for some reason, Karen.
61	11	"Kid Stuff"	Jeff Beesley	Brent Butt	November 27, 2006	4–11	1.43
When Emma starts using Brent's old bedroom as a sewing area, she gives his old toys to Hank to free up space – causing Brent to suddenly feel sentimental. Oscar starts selling cookies door-to-door in an effort to make extra cash and has a surprisingly eager assistant in Karen. Meanwhile Davis frustrates Lacey by trying to order off the new kids' menu. And Wanda attempts to be more "folksy" with Corner Gas customers.
62	12	"Mother's Day"	David Storey	Kevin White	January 22, 2007	4–12	1.40
After neglecting to buy Emma a Mother's Day present, Brent finds himself trying to get back into her good books by crushing Hank's efforts to be a better son than he is. This is nothing but good news to Oscar who realizes that he can now get away with pretty much anything. Over at the Ruby Lacey and Davis try to see who can embarrass the other more by bringing up each other's inabilities. Meanwhile Karen and Wanda buy a hutch from a Swedish super store and have some problems putting it together.
63	13	"Census Sensibility"	David Storey	Paul Mather	January 29, 2007	4–13	N/A
When Oscar has to find a way to pay for Emma's damaged bushes he takes the job as a census taker. The only problem is he's partnered with Hank, who would prefer to work alone. Meanwhile Wanda and Brent attempt to make extra cash by selling Meal Replacement bars, and a misunderstanding leads Lacey to believe that two of Dog River's finest are involved in a scandalous affair.
64	14	"The Good Old Table Hockey Game"	Rob De Lint	Mark Farrell	February 5, 2007	4–14	1.63
When Davis buys a table hockey game for the police station Brent and Karen show down to see who is the ultimate champion. Hank, in seeing how Brent is preparing for the big game decides that maybe Karen is a better role model to follow. This is a parody of the Canada-USSR Summit Series. It draws many parallels including Brent's post-game interview, focus on Brent's conditioning and crowd boos. Meanwhile, Lacey, thinking Emma is quite deserving of the award, decides to nominate her as a Woman of Distinction.
65	15	"Lacey Borrows"	Rob De Lint	Andrew Carr	February 12, 2007	4–15	1.70
When Karen thinks that she and Lacey are past the point of asking to borrow things it becomes open season on each other's possessions. Meanwhile Oscar, Emma and Wanda are aghast that Brent has never seen a horror movie and set out to scare the crap out of him. Hank, in an effort to save time getting stuff from his truck, starts wearing cargo pants that can hold everything you could ever need... ever.
66	16	"Potato Bowl"	Brent Butt	Andrew Carr & Kevin White	February 19, 2007	4–16	1.48
When Wanda accidentally breaks Emma's famous Potato Bowl the pressure is on for her to amend the situation. Meanwhile Hank tries to become a better story teller by making fun of Brent and Lacey. And Oscar, Karen, and Davis start their own secret club.
67	17	"Seeing Things"	David Storey	Mark Farrell & Robert Sheridan	February 26, 2007	4–17	1.74
Brent decides to try different alternatives to glasses after his break, something Wanda does not quite believe he's man enough to do. Karen and Davis take advantage of Hank's newfound talent for writing slogans by putting an original on the cop car. The nature of the slogan causes Oscar to take the law into his own hands.
68	18	"Happy Campers"	David Storey	Paul Mather	March 5, 2007	4–18	1.79
Brent and Oscar have to take Davis on their annual camping trip which makes things more complicated than they would have liked. Hank finds himself with a once-in-a-lifetime good-hair day and does his best to hold on to it. And in an effort to prove to each other how difficult their jobs are, Lacey and Wanda decide to switch jobs for a while.
69	19	"Gopher It"	David Storey	Mark Farrell	March 12, 2007	4–19	1.89
Hank has an idea to increase tourism to Dog River which causes consequences nobody could have foreseen. Oscar also has an idea but is afraid to bring it forward for fear of being labeled a crazy old man. The newfound popularity of Dog River causes a business boom at Corner Gas and the Ruby as well as Wanda getting a weekly guest spot on popular Canadian news program. Davis tries to work as Fitzy's personal body guard during the transition while Karen thinks loyal, honest police work is best. Guest stars: Stephen Harper, Seamus O'Regan, Beverly Thomson, Rosemary Thompson

=== Season 5 (2007–08) ===
No. overall	No. in season	Title	Directed by	Written by	Original release date	Prod. code	Can. viewers (millions)
70	1	"Cable Excess"	David Storey	Mark Farrell	September 24, 2007	5-01	1.20
When someone complains that Dog River does not have enough local programming, ideas abound for the next great cable show and Brent is selected to choose which idea will be produced, causing everyone to kiss up to him. Lacey, Emma, and Wanda encounter some creative differences in their show planning, while Hank becomes the subject of Karen and Davis' new cop program. Guest stars: Steve Cochrane, Sharon Pope
71	2	"Spin Cycle"	Rob De Lint	Kevin White & Dylan Worts	October 8, 2007	5-02	1.24
Karen's attempt at group exercise turns out to be more than she bargained for when she meets the instructor. Wanda buys a new phone for Corner Gas and Brent enjoys not using it while Oscar uses it too much. Emma is putting together a Dog River calendar which Lacey decides she would like to be a part of, until she finds out what the requirements are.
72	3	"Whiner Takes All"	David Storey	Andrew Carr	October 15, 2007	5-03	1.24
Lacey thinks golfing with Brent and Hank will be all fun and games until a warning by Brent creates a competitive triangle. Oscar and Emma's new bed causes Emma to question her dreams, while Oscar is just happy with position nine. Karen is appalled when Davis accepts a free meal from Wanda in exchange for services unrendered.
73	4	"Dark Circles"	David Storey	Brent Butt	October 22, 2007	5-04	1.48
Hank tries to freak out the people of Dog River but the result of his prank is a crop circle he did not create. Davis is intrigued by this possible visit by aliens but only Karen knows the whole story. The Leroy home gets a paint job driving Oscar out of the house and causing Emma to question her sanity. An accidental wardrobe change by Brent piques Lacey's interest, and Wanda takes it upon herself to play matchmaker for Lacey. Guest star: Christopher Finn
74	5	"Wash Me"	Rob De Lint	Norm Hiscock	October 29, 2007	5-05	1.40
Wanda's happy when her latest crush gives her his number. But her love life soon hinges on whether Hank washes his truck or not. Meanwhile, Brent starts to question his sense of smell in the presence of Oscar and Emma, and Lacey gives the Ruby an artistic touch-up courtesy of Karen, whose drawings seem to appeal to everyone but Davis.
75	6	"The Eight Samurai"	David Storey	Gary Pearson	November 12, 2007	5-06	1.28
A committee including Emma and Karen try to find a suitable gift to send to their twin town in Japan; meanwhile Emma looks for the misplaced gift they received. Brent reluctantly teams up with Lacey to help make The Ruby and Corner Gas more environmentally friendly. While filling in at the hotel bar, Wanda attempts to become the advice-giving bartender she thinks everyone needs.
76	7	"Buzz Driver"	Rob De Lint	Brent Butt	November 19, 2007	5-07	1.61
When Oscar is asked to fill in for the school's bus driver his no-nonsense attitude ends up doing him more harm than good. Hank convinces Lacey to let him advertise for the Ruby, and Corner Gas gets a shipment of a new energy drink that proves irresistible to Wanda.
77	8	"Classical Gas"	Rob De Lint	Mark Farell	January 14, 2008*	5-08	1.16
Brent meets a family member Oscar and Emma never told him about. Wanda tries to prove her intelligence by showcasing her math skills, but not without Karen's help. Davis' taste buds are enticed by changes to the Ruby's menu. *This Episode was accidentally broadcast by The Comedy Network on December 15, 2007, a full month before it was supposed to first air on CTV. Guest star: Biski Gugushe
78	9	"Game Set and Mouse"	David Storey	Brent Butt	January 21, 2008	5-09	1.27
When a mouse finds its way into Corner Gas, Oscar makes it his personal mission to capture and kill it, something Davis is hesitant to let him do. Emma and Karen rush to Wanda's aid when she hurts her back, but their methods fall short of successful. Brent and Hank invent a new game but Lacey ruins their fun.
79	10	"Knit Wit of the Month"	Rob De Lint	Norm Hiscock	January 28, 2008	5–10	1.18
To Wanda's dismay, Brent refuses to follow Lacey's example of employee recognition. She seeks appreciation at the Ruby but finds she cannot live up to the title. Hank takes up knitting as a hobby and hounds Emma to teach him a new stitch. Oscar takes over the seniors' column in the Howler, and Karen and Davis decide to help him to keep him off the streets.
80	11	"Top Gum"	Rob De Lint	Andrew Carr	February 4, 2008	5–11	1.41
Hank and Oscar's gumballs start selling like hotcakes when Karen joins as a partner. Inspired by Emma, Brent tries his hand at water divination, but is embarrassed by his findings. Wanda sells a house to Lacey and Davis, who plan to flip it and make a profit when Davis suddenly has second thoughts.
81	12	"The J-Word"	Don McCutcheon	Gary Pearson	February 11, 2008	5–12	1.48
Brent decides to stop Oscar from saying his favourite word while a psychic tells Lacey some unpleasant news about her future. Davis terrifies himself while trying to re-enact a scene from a movie and Karen rescues him; and Emma and Wanda try to organize a non-girly girls party.
82	13	"Outside the Box"	Don McCutcheon	Mark Farell	February 18, 2008	5–13	1.41
Hank and Davis do everything in their power to stop a call centre from coming to Dog River while Emma gets a job to promote it. Wanda skips work and attends funerals, which Oscar thinks is a great idea. Meanwhile, a suspicious box in Lacey's house piques the interest of Karen and Brent.
83	14	"Contagious Fortune"	Jeff Beesley	Norm Hiscock & Dylan Worts	March 10, 2008	5–14	1.23
Lacey is suspicious about the illegal duplication of Dog River money; Brent and Wanda panic over Hank's pinkeye; Karen is frustrated at Davis' inability to think for himself.
84	15	"No Time Like the Presents"	David Storey	Kevin White	March 17, 2008	5–15	1.16
Karen and Davis bribe Oscar into telling them what Emma is buying them for Christmas. Lacey thinks that Wanda does not consider her a friend. Confusion ensues when Hank resets his watch in order to be on Daylight Saving Time in Saskatchewan.
85	16	"Coming Distractions"	David Storey	Norm Hiscock & Gary Pearson	March 31, 2008	5–16	0.96
Hank bribes Brent and Davis into taking him to see the latest blockbuster — RaptorMan 2; Emma invites Lacey to join a women's club although Lacey feels she won't fit in; Oscar finally gets a sidewalk put in front of his house and Karen is forced to protect it. Guest stars: Duane "Dog" Chapman, Beth Smith Chapman
86	17	"The Accidental Cleanist"	Brent Butt	Andrew Carr	April 7, 2008*	5–17	1.08
Discovering that Emma's cleaning habits follow a clear emotional trigger, Karen and Davis get her to clean for them. Hank accidentally drops something through the cracks of the Ruby deck only to discover a whole new world underneath it. Brent donates money to the town getting a legacy in return. Oscar feels his legacy is overshadowed causing him to take action and gets one of his own. *This Episode was accidentally broadcast by The Comedy Network on March 29, 2008, a week before it was supposed to first air on CTV
87	18	"Bed and Brake Fast"	David Storey	Kevin White	April 14, 2008	5–18	1.19
Oscar's new get-rich-quick scheme seems to be flawless...until Emma foils it. Davis starts borrowing Brent's car without telling him why he's taking it. Lacey wins Hank's handyman services at a silent auction, but ends up having to do twice the amount of work because of it. Guest stars: Travis Moen
88	19	"Final Countdown"	David Storey	Kevin White & Norm Hiscock	April 21, 2008	5–19	1.32
It's half an hour before midnight when Brent officially turns 40. To help celebrate, Wanda has planned an elaborate fireworks display that goes dangerously wrong when Oscar and Davis help out. Karen tries to keep the peace as Lacey and Emma duel over who should be baking Brent's cake. And Brent's plans for a special night go awry when he discovers that a bottle of vintage scotch he was saving for just this occasion has gone missing, thanks to Hank. Guest stars: Shirley Douglas (voice), Kiefer Sutherland

=== Season 6 (2008–09) ===
No. overall	No. in season	Title	Directed by	Written by	Original release date	Prod. code	Can. viewers (millions)
89	1	"Full Load"	Don McCutcheon	Brent Butt	October 13, 2008	6-01	1.16
When Brent enters a reluctant Lacey into an eating contest, it tarnishes his reputation and results in a very offended Davis. At the Leroys', Emma's new MP3 player allows Oscar to get away with a bit too much. Karen's auctioneering experience pits Hank and Wanda in a battle of vehicles.
90	2	"Bend It Like Brent"	David Storey	Andrew Carr	October 20, 2008	6-02	1.18
Davis' decision to take on Brent and Lacey as the sponsors for his soccer team lands him in hot water with the players' parents. Meanwhile, Karen is spooked out of the police cruiser driver's seat and enlists Hank's help getting around town. And when an old tape of Wanda doing television projects for a college broadcast course winds up in Oscar and Emma's hands, it's all fun and games until Oscar and Emma find out the last laugh is on them.
91	3	"Self-Serving"	David Storey	Mark Farrell	October 27, 2008	6-03	1.23
Brent thinks the self-serve option at Corner Gas will make his life easier, until he discovers his customers are enjoying it a little too much. On the other hand, Lacey's Ruby buffet has her customers working overtime. Wanda's quest to reclaim her title as Rumour Queen proves disastrous for Karen and Emma, while Hank's old laptop becomes a hot potato when he tries to sell it to either Oscar or Davis.
92	4	"Meat Wave"	Don McCutcheon	Dylan Wertz	November 10, 2008	6-04	1.07
Hank's mockery of Brent's air conditioner temperature lands him in hot water at Corner Gas. Karen and Davis win a meat draw but trouble starts when they have nowhere to store it and trust Oscar and Emma with their stash. Lacey and Wanda unleash their maternal instincts on an unwanted pet left at the Ruby. Guest star: David Suzuki
93	5	"All That and a Bag of Chips"	Rob De Lint	Norm Hiscock	November 17, 2008	6-05	1.19
In spite of Lacey and Davis's best efforts, Karen is labeled a thief when she forgets to pay for a muffin. Wanda tries to get inside Hank's head and figure out his new email password, while Brent must put his culinary skills to good use to prove to Oscar and Emma that he is not a freeloading son.
94	6	"Good Tubbin'"	Rob De Lint	Kevin White	November 24, 2008	6-06	1.23
Lacey is excited about Oscar and Emma's hot tub party until she discovers she is the only guest in attendance. Davis charms Dog River as their new safety mascot, until Karen dons the suit. Brent tries to crack the mystery of where Hank is staying after damage to Hank's house leaves him homeless.
95	7	"American Resolution"	David Storey	Mark Farrell	January 12, 2009	6-07	1.01
Hank, Karen, and Wanda's willpower is put to the test when they try to make one another break their New Year's resolutions (Wanda must stop eating licorice, Hank gives up comic books, and Karen will jog every day). Davis tries to get out of making coffee at the police station and Brent and Emma teach Oscar a thing or two about being a Canadian citizen.
96	8	"Reader Pride"	Don McCutcheon	Norm Hiscock & Dylan Wertz	January 19, 2009	6-08	0.98
Brent has trouble proving to Lacey and Hank that he's a true Roughriders fan. Davis enlightens Wanda to the unwritten rules of mix-CDs, while Karen volunteers to read books at the seniors' home and has some unlikely fans in Oscar and Emma. Guest stars: Matt Dominguez, Gene Makowsky
97	9	"Rock Stars"	Don McCutcheon	Brent Butt	January 26, 2009	6-09	1.12
When Brent decides to learn the guitar, his instructor makes him realize just how uncool he is, and leads Oscar into the path of his childhood nemesis. Wanda takes on a secret identity in a new Howler column much to the suspicion of Lacey and inconvenience of Davis. Hank tries to prove he's stronger than Emma after taking Karen's workout advice. Guest star: Gordon Pinsent
98	10	"Shirt Disturber"	David Storey	Kevin White & Norm Hiscock	February 2, 2009	6–10	0.99
Brent and Hank are on the outs after a trip to see their favourite comic book writer goes awry. Lacey's generous donations to the thrift store make the perfect gifts for Karen to celebrate her recent promotion. Oscar and Emma's new home alarm system causes more emergencies than Davis bargained for. Guest star: Ron Boyd
99	11	"Cat River Daze"	Jeff Beesley	Mark Farrell	February 16, 2009	6–11	0.78
When it is announced that Dog River Days has been cancelled, Lacey enlists the help of Davis and Hank to save them. Emma asks Oscar to get rid of the stray cats in her garden, but the task proves more difficult than Oscar thought, and gives Karen a new reputation. Brent fakes an injury in Corner Gas to teach Wanda a lesson. Guest stars: Craig Northey, Odds
100	12	"Super Sensitive"	Jeff Beesley	Andrew Carr	February 23, 2009	6–12	0.86
Davis gets a lesson in sensitivity after Karen is offended by his blonde jokes. Brent and Lacey try to convince Hank that superstitions are fake and Wanda takes on Emma's identity at the Rec Plex realizing that becoming Emma Leroy is not as easy as she thought.
101	13	"TV Free Dog River"	David Storey	Norm Hiscock & Dylan Wertz	March 2, 2009	6–13	1.17
Emma keeps a watchful eye on the citizens of Dog River to ensure the town reigns supreme over Wullerton in "Turn Off Your TV Week". Lacey and Oscar find a profitable way to break the rules and Karen and Davis hit the radio airwaves to help everyone cope. Brent finds a creative way to get through a week of no TV with the help of Hank and Wanda. Guest star: Michael Bublé
102	14	"Queasy Rider"	David Storey	Brent Butt & Kevin White	March 9, 2009	6–14	1.12
Wanda's new way of getting around town brings a European flair to Dog River much to Brent's inconvenience. Lacey tricks Karen and Davis into helping her move. Meanwhile, Hank's new greeting puts him in an awkward situation with Emma and annoys Oscar.
103	15	"R2 Bee Too"	Don McCutcheon	Norm Hiscock	March 16, 2009	6–15	1.14
Jealous of Hank's new toy robot, Davis places an order online but is surprised when his robot arrives. Despite Emma's warning, Lacey's quest to expand Brent's culinary horizons turns Brent into a food critic from hell. Wanda suits up to help Oscar combat a beehive.
104	16	"Crab Apple Cooler"	Don McCutcheon	Andrew Carr	March 23, 2009	6–16	1.18
Brent and Hank decide to take a trip down memory lane stealing crab apples from a neighbour's yard that gets Hank in trouble. No one wants Oscar on their charades team, until he proves his skills. Davis and Wanda find reasons to write angry complaint letters to companies in hopes of getting free stuff.
105	17	"Happy Career Day to You"	Brent Butt	Kevin White & Dylan Wertz	March 30, 2009	6–17	1.12
When Emma inadvertently finds herself a substitute teacher at the elementary school she asks Karen and Wanda to talk to the kids about their careers, causing tension to erupt. Lacey's attempt to make the Ruby more birthday friendly goes too far. Meanwhile, Brent and Hank panic after they suspect Oscar has eaten a 30-year-old snack cake.
106	18	"Get the F Off My Lawn"	David Storey	Norm Hiscock & Kevin White	April 6, 2009	6–18	1.73
Lacey and Davis are on the hunt after two of the letters in the "CAFE" sign are blown off the roof during a bad windstorm. Wanda's demands for more rights at Corner Gas lead to unexpected opportunities for Hank and more headaches for Brent. Meanwhile, Oscar worries about Emma after Karen's pick in a jam contest. Guest star: Brad Wall
107	19	"You've Been Great, Goodnight"	David Storey	Brent Butt & Kevin White	April 13, 2009	6–19	3.02
Brent's mysterious disappearances every Wednesday night have the whole town talking. When it is discovered he has been pursuing a lifelong dream that threatens to take him out of Dog River, everyone is forced to cope with the news.
