= Park Place (Barrie) =

- Location: Barrie, Ontario, Canada
- Coordinates: 44.34535°N 79.68156°W
- Address: Highway 400 exit 90
- Opened: 2008
- Developer: North American Acquisition Inc
- Num. of stores: 42
- Website: parkplacebarrie.com

Park Place (formerly Molson Park) is a power centre located in the south end of Barrie, Ontario, Canada. The land operated as a brewery from 1967 to 1999, and as a high-capacity outdoor concert venue from 1987 to 2005.

As a music venue, Molson Park saw events such as Edgefest and Vans Warped Tour, and acts including Beastie Boys, Rage Against the Machine, Aretha Franklin, Radiohead, Creed, 3 Doors Down, Pearl Jam, Neil Young, NOFX, and Oasis.

From 2002 to 2004, the abandoned brewery operated as the largest illegal cannabis grow-operation in Canadian history.

The current shopping centre includes a Best Buy, LA Fitness, Marshalls, and a Cabela's.

== Brewery ==
In 1967, the Formosa Spring Brewery reached its bottling capacity in its Formosa, Ontario, location, and began looking to expand. The 597-acre farmland was annexed from Innisfil by the City of Barrie to establish the new brewery, still under the Formosa name. In 1974, Molson's purchased the land and brewery, creating a parkland, baseball diamond, and adding a drive-through beer store for cottagers driving on Highway 400.

Due to a change in inter-provincial alcohol production regulations, the Molsons plant was closed and abandoned in September 2000. In late November 1999 in a last-ditch effort to save their jobs, workers staged an occupation of the plant. Following an end to the occupation, the lands were thereafter put on the market for sale, subsequently purchased by a commercial land developer and renamed 'Park Place'.

== Concert venue ==
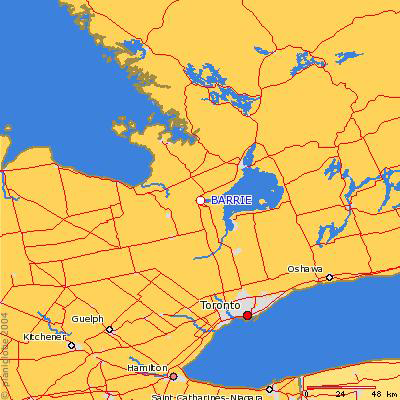
Barrie in relation to Toronto

In 1987, the Toronto-based Edgefest began looking for a new open-air venue to support large acts. After considering Downsview Park, Mosport International Raceway and Cayuga Speedway, as well as a farmer's field in Oakville, the organisers settled on Molson Park, despite its 90 km ([55 mi]) distance from Toronto. In an effort to motivate fans to drive to Barrie, the 1987 Edgefest sold tickets for $1.02.

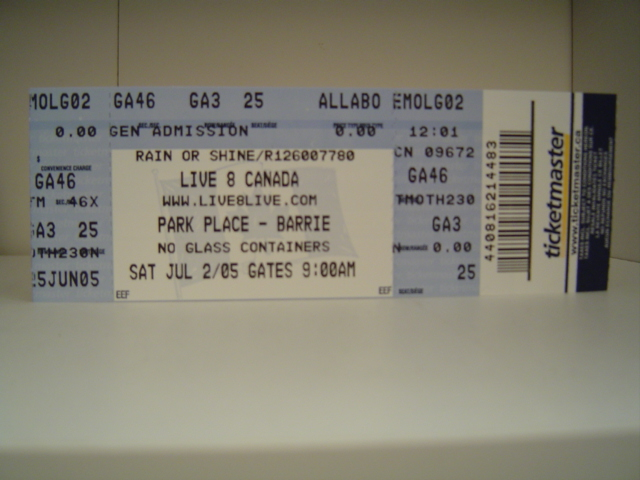
A Live 8 ticket for the Barrie show

With an attendance of 25,000 people, the 1987 Edgefest demonstrated Molson Park as a venue for large Toronto-based festivals. Many Toronto-based festivals began to follow suit, from 1987 until its commercial redevelopment in 2005. Notable festivals include:

- 102.1 The Edge's Edgefest, 1987–2003
- Lollapalooza, 1992–1996
- CFNY Canada Day Festival, 1987–1990
- The Great Canadian Party, 1992
- Summersault, 1998, 2000
- Vans Warped Tour, 2000–2007
- Live 8 concert, Barrie, July 2, 2005
- Canada Day Concert, July 1, 1993, featured Van Halen, Kim Mitchell, Vince Neil, the concert drew over 50,000 people

== Cannabis cultivation ==
On January 12, 2004, the former Molsons plant was found to be the site of an illegal cannabis cultivation business housing an estimated 30,000 cannabis plants with an estimated street value of $30 million; at the time, it was the largest cannabis cultivation bust in Canada's history.

Operating in secret for 2 years, the operation was undertaken by Robert DeRosa, brother of landowner Vince DeRosa, claiming to run two companies called Ontario Pallet and Barrie Fish. In addition to the Molsons plant, there was a building on Highway 11 in Oro-Medonte Township, and a third building in St. Catharines, Ontario.

During the undercover operation, Robert also described plans to ship cocaine from Colombia to Canada hidden inside fish. He was later tracked down and arrested in Cuba. Robert was sentenced to seven years in prison, and claimed his brother knew nothing of the cannabis operation. Robert's wife Bernice Laan, and 18-year-old son also faced charges. Charges were dropped against another man, Daniel Moore. Drago Dolic, also involved, was already serving 27 years in prison in Louisiana. 12 employees were also charged during the bust.

After sale of the plant, legal proceedings followed concerning Vince's rights to the money from the sale. Prosecutors alleged that a seizure of the property, along with Robert's home in Phelpston, Ontario, was justified under organized crime laws. Vince eventually won rights to the $4 million in proceeds from the sale, in 2014.

== Power centre ==
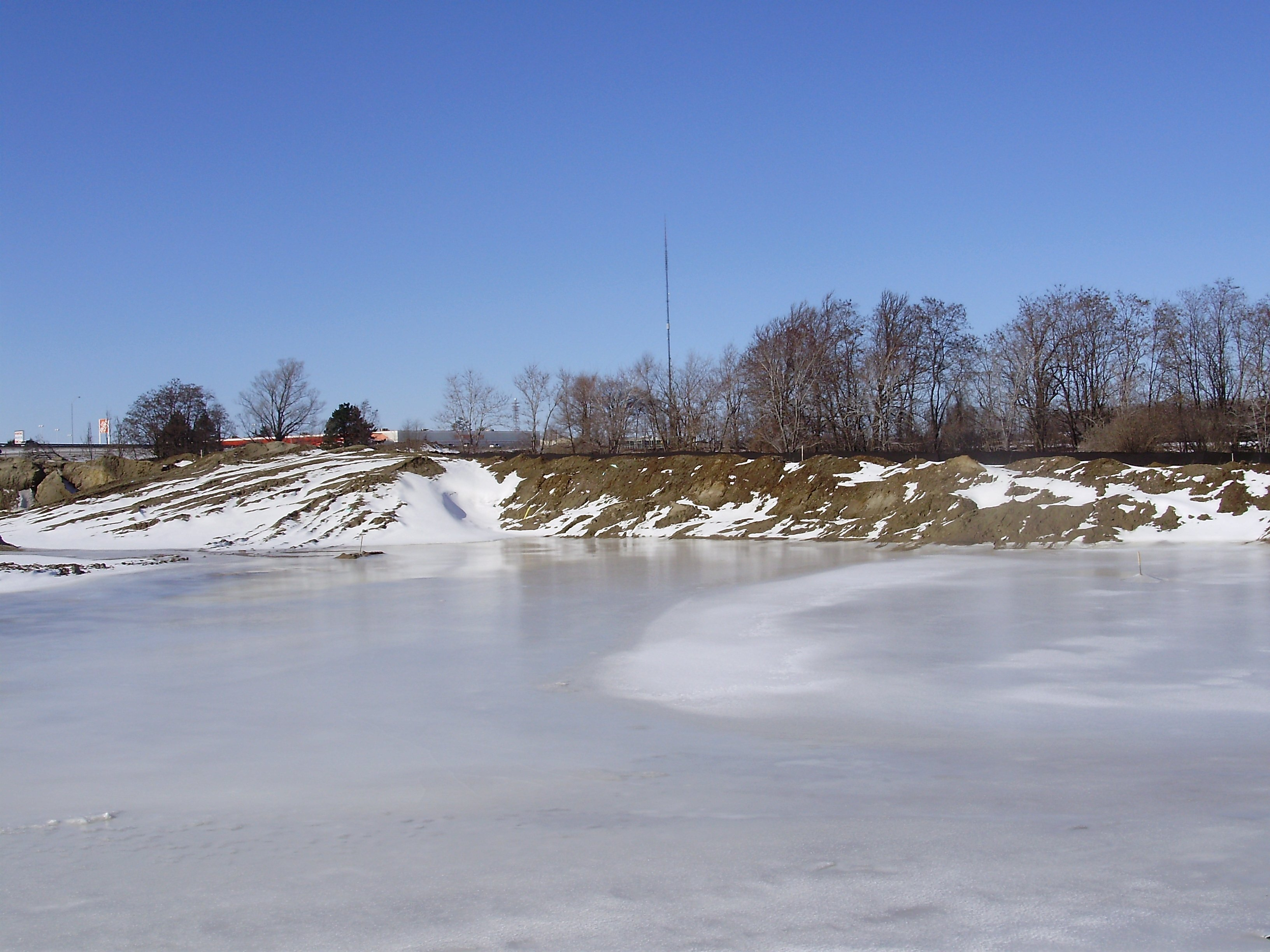
Park Place construction paused during the OMB appeal in 2009

On October 31, 2006, commercial real estate developers North American Acquisition Inc (NAA), a subsidiary of North American Development Group, LLC (NADG) won an Ontario Municipal Board (OMB) appeal of a rezoning application that had been previously denied by the City of Barrie to rezone the Park Place lands from general industrial to business park zones, and general commercial or mixed employment.

The City of Barrie had opposed NAA's rezoning application on the basis that it would use a large portion of the city's scarce industrial lands, yet only contribute low-wage retail jobs to the local economy.

In 2002, the Park Place designs described a car-free, pedestrian-focused outdoor commercial centre hosting hotels, an IMAX cinema, and landscaping.

After the OMB appeal, development began instead with a box store power center concept, blamed by developer Terry Coughlin on the 2008 economic downturn: "We're not going to get those fashion-type stores we thought originally. A lot aren't doing too well and they’re working in outlet mode. They’re all going down to Cookstown. ... We're not going to become a fashion centre, even though it was a good idea in 2002 when we started."
