= Choir! Choir! Choir! =

Canadian choir

Choir! Choir! Choir! is a Canadian musical choir, based in Toronto, Ontario. Instead of a traditional organizational model, the choir is structured as an open participation group where anybody who wants to attend an event is welcome to perform as part of the choir.

== History ==
The group was founded in 2011 by Daveed Goldman and Nobu Adilman, initially as a one-off event for the birthday party of Matt Murphy. Meeting at Clinton's Tavern in Toronto twice weekly, each performance revolves around a single song, starting with Goldman and Adilman teaching the song's arrangement to the participants, and culminating in a live performance of the song.

=== 2015 ===
In December 2015, they performed John Lennon's "Imagine" at Lee's Palace as a fundraising event to raise money for Syrian refugees. The event raised enough money to sponsor two full families. In the same month, they collaborated with BADBADNOTGOOD to perform the holiday classic "Christmas Time Is Here".

=== 2016 ===
The group attracted widespread media attention for several performances in 2016. Their rendition of David Bowie's "Space Oddity", performed at the Art Gallery of Ontario six days after Bowie's death, went viral on the internet and saw the choir invited to perform at two Bowie tribute shows in New York City, at Carnegie Hall and Radio City Music Hall; a performance of Prince's "When Doves Cry" in May 2016 drew 1,999 participants to Massey Hall; and their regular Clinton's Tavern session on May 25, 2016 was devoted to The Tragically Hip's "Ahead by a Century" following musician Gord Downie's announcement earlier in the week of his diagnosis with terminal brain cancer. On June 19, 2016, they performed Cyndi Lauper's "True Colors" at Nathan Phillips Square, at a memorial vigil for the Orlando nightclub shooting. The choir has also performed as an opening act for Patti Smith and Jay Leno, and as supporting musicians with Tegan and Sara.

=== 2017 ===
On October 24, 2017, they hosted a public gathering at Nathan Phillips Square in tribute to Gord Downie, who had died a week earlier. This gathering, unusually, focused on performances of multiple songs by The Tragically Hip instead of just one, including "Ahead by a Century", "Bobcaygeon", "Courage (for Hugh MacLennan)" and "Poets". On November 26, 2017, they performed "O Canada" before the 2017 Grey Cup in Ottawa.

=== 2018 ===
In January 2018, Goldman and Adilman teamed up with David Byrne at New York City's Public Theatre for a Choir! Choir! Choir! EPIC Night performing David Bowie's classic anthem "Heroes".

In April 2018, Rick Astley joined with the choir for a performance of his 1987 hit "Never Gonna Give You Up", which had a burst of renewed publicity in the mid-2010s due to the internet phenomenon of rickrolling. One of the attendees at that show, Mattea Roach, later referenced it during their championship streak on the game show Jeopardy!. On October 11, 2018, six days before the one-year anniversary of Downie's death, the Tragically Hip's Johnny Fay and Rob Baker joined Choir! Choir! Choir! at Yonge-Dundas Square (now Sankofa Square) for a live performance of the Tragically Hip's "Grace, Too".

=== 2019 ===
On April 5, 2019, Choir! Choir Choir! performed The Beatles' "Here Comes the Sun" at Nathan Phillips Square as part of the Daffodil Campaign, a Canadian Cancer Society fundraiser. As the event began, Goldman and Adilman invited a 23-year-old woman named Sabrina, a 10-year cancer survivor, to the microphone to speak. Choir participants raised aloft hundreds of daffodils, provided by the Canadian Cancer Society, as the song ended.

=== 2020 ===
In March 2020, during the COVID-19 pandemic, the organizers announced that they would livestream a virtual singalong, featuring the songs "Stand By Me", "You've Got a Friend", "Space Oddity", "Wish You Were Here", "Lean on Me", "With a Little Help From My Friends" and "I'll Be There for You", on March 17.

=== 2024 ===
On September 5, 2024, Goldman and Adilman led a public singalong of several Tragically Hip songs following the theatrical premiere of the documentary series The Tragically Hip: No Dress Rehearsal at the 2024 Toronto International Film Festival.

=== 2025 ===
They appeared in the fifth season of Canada's Got Talent in 2025. In April 2025 they announced a tour of Western Canada for the fall, performing the music of Queen.

=== 2026 ===
In April 2026, they are slated to co-headline a "Great Canadian Sing-Along" concert at Fallsview Casino with Trans-Canada Highwaymen.

== Awards ==
The group were finalists for "Torontonian of the Year" on CBLA-FM's Metro Morning in 2015.

== See also ==
- Pub Choir, similar project founded in Australia in 2017
