= Poets (song) =

Single by The Tragically Hip

from the album Phantom Power
- Released: June 1998
- Genre: Rock
- Length: 3:59
- Label: Universal
- Songwriter: The Tragically Hip
- Producer: Steve Berlin

The Tragically Hip singles chronology
"Springtime in Vienna" (1997)	"Poets" (1998)	"Something On" (1998)

"Poets" is a song by Canadian rock band The Tragically Hip. It was released in June 1998 as the lead single from their sixth studio album, Phantom Power. The song reached number-one on Canada's Alternative chart, and stayed number-one for 12 weeks straight, longer than any song in the history of that chart.

The song was a live staple for the band, and was performed at several of the band's biggest concerts, including their performance at Woodstock 1999, their performance at the Live 8 concert in 2005 (with Dan Aykroyd playing harmonica), and their farewell show in 2016.

In 2026, CBC Music published a ranking of the top ten Tragically Hip songs to mark the tenth anniversary of the band's historic final performance, ranking "Poets" at #10.

== Charts ==
Chart (1998)	Peak position
Canadian RPM Singles Chart	4
Canadian RPM Alternative 30	1
Canadian RPM Adult Contemporary Chart	28
U.S. Billboard Heritage Rock	22
U.S. Billboard Mainstream Rock Tracks	39
