= Springtime in Vienna =

1997 single by the Tragically Hip

Single by The Tragically Hip

from the album Trouble at the Henhouse
- Released: May 1997
- Genre: Alternative rock
- Length: 4:32
- Label: MCA
- Songwriter(s): The Tragically Hip
- Producer(s): Mark Vreeken, The Tragically Hip

The Tragically Hip singles chronology
"Flamenco" (1997)	"Springtime in Vienna" (1997)	"Poets" (1998)

"Springtime in Vienna" is a song by Canadian rock group The Tragically Hip. It was released in May 1997 as the fifth and final single from their fifth studio album, Trouble at the Henhouse. The song peaked at number 11 on Canada's RPM Singles Chart.

On at least one occasion before his death in 2017, Gord Downie identified "Springtime in Vienna" as his own favourite song from the Tragically Hip repertoire.

== Charts ==
=== Weekly charts ===
Chart (1997)	Peak position
Canadian RPM Singles Chart	11
Canadian RPM Alternative 30	12

=== Year-end charts ===
Chart (1997)	Position
Canada Top Singles (RPM)	86
