= Scared (The Tragically Hip song) =

1995 single by the Tragically Hip

Single by The Tragically Hip

from the album Day for Night
- Released: September 1995
- Genre: Folk
- Length: 4:11
- Label: MCA
- Songwriter(s): The Tragically Hip
- Producer(s): Mark Howard

The Tragically Hip singles chronology
"So Hard Done By" (1995)	"Scared" (1995)	"Thugs" (1996)

"Scared" is a song by Canadian rock band the Tragically Hip. It was released in September 1995 as the fifth single from their 1994 album, Day for Night. The song peaked at number 57 on the Canadian RPM Singles chart. It was featured in the 2006 film Trailer Park Boys: The Movie and was included on its soundtrack.

The song was reportedly written about by Allan Gregg, a Canadian pollster and political advisor. At the time, the Tragically Hip were managed by the Management Trust Ltd., where Gregg was a partner. As he discussed on the Toronto Mike'd podcast, Gregg says the band wrote the song in response to some critical feedback he provided on early versions of tracks for the band's 1994 album, Day for Night.

== Track listing ==
All tracks are written by the Tragically Hip.

No.	Title	Length
1.	"Scared" (Edit)	4:11
2.	"Dare Devil" (Reprise)	7:18
3.	"So Hard Done By"	2:57
4.	"Three Pistols"	3:46
Total length:		18:12

== Charts ==
Chart (1994)	Peak position
Canadian RPM Singles Chart	57
