= The Strombo Show =

- Genre: music
- Country of origin: Canada
- Language: English
- Home station: CFRB/CJAD (2005-2007); Corus Entertainment (2007-2009); CBC Music (2009-2023)
- Starring: George Stroumboulopoulos
- Original release: 2005 – 2023

The Strombo Show is a Canadian radio show hosted by George Stroumboulopoulos, which aired from 2005 to 2023 across various Canadian radio stations and networks.

The show originated on Standard Broadcasting's CFRB in Toronto and CJAD in Montreal as a light-hearted news-oriented talk show. In November 2007, the show moved to the Corus network and the format changed, with a focus on music. The Strombo Show broadcast from 102.1 The Edge's Toronto studio and on other radio stations in the Corus Entertainment network, including CFOX-FM in Vancouver, Power 97 in Winnipeg, FM96 in London and Y108 in Hamilton. On the Corus network, the show aired for three hours on Sunday nights, combining music, celebrity guests and calls from listeners.

The show moved to CBC Radio 2 in November 2009. In an interview with ChartAttack, Stroumboulopoulos acknowledged that being on a public radio network gave him more flexibility to choose music without the genre limitations of the Corus version of his show, which aired on modern rock and active rock stations.

== CBC Radio 2 ==
Every Sunday night on CBC Music, the show followed a freeform format, airing contemporary music personally chosen by Stroumboulopoulos. The program was not recorded in the CBC's main studios, but in Stroumboulopoulos' own home.

Each show featured a conversation and live acoustic performance from various guests. Past guests included major international artists like Queens of the Stone Age, Vampire Weekend, Slash, The National, Patti Smith, Band of Horses, Greg Graffin of Bad Religion, Ghostface Killah and Buddy Guy to Canadian talent such as Gord Downie, Joel Plaskett, Arkells, Tegan & Sara, Emily Haines, Billy Talent and City & Colour.

Other regular features of the show included a 'Nod to the Gods' segment at the top of each show that celebrated important forces in music and the Magnificent Seven countdown highlighted the seven best new tracks of the week, as determined by Stroumboulopoulos - its namesake also serves as a testament to The Clash. The Strombo Show paid tribute to Tom Waits' music on Ten With Tom, and 'The Blend' was a 15-minute mix from some of Canada's best DJ's.

Live sessions recorded for the program were also uploaded to Stroumboulopoulos' YouTube channel as The Strombo Show Sessions.

On January 1, 2017, the show aired a special episode entitled The Hip 30, which consisted of Canadian musicians performing live covers of The Tragically Hip's songs and sharing their thoughts on the band's impact on Canadian culture. Participating artists included Blue Rodeo, Sarah Harmer, Barenaked Ladies, Donovan Woods, Choir! Choir! Choir!, SATE, Hey Rosetta! and Rheostatics.

In August 2023, the show was replaced on the CBC Music schedule by Afterdark Sunday, a program hosted by Tariq Hussain.
