= Ahead by a Century =

1996 single by the Tragically Hip

Single by the Tragically Hip

from the album Trouble at the Henhouse
- Released: April 22, 1996
- Length: 3:43
- Label: MCA
- Songwriters: Rob Baker; Gordon Downie; Johnny Fay; Paul Langlois; Gord Sinclair
- Producers: Mark Vreeken; the Tragically Hip

The Tragically Hip singles chronology
"Thugs" (1996)	"Ahead by a Century" (1996)	"Gift Shop" (1996)

Music video
- "Ahead by a Century" on YouTube

"Ahead by a Century" is a song by Canadian rock band the Tragically Hip. It was released as the lead single from the band's fifth studio album, Trouble at the Henhouse. The song reached number one on Canada's singles chart, and is the band's most successful single in their native Canada. It was one of the 10 most-played songs in Canada in 1996. The song was nominated for "Best Single" at the 1997 Juno Awards. The song has been certified 5x platinum in Canada.

"Ahead by a Century" was the final song performed by the band at their final concert on August 20, 2016. CBC Television used the song for their highlight montage to close their coverage of the 2016 Summer Olympics. It subsequently was also used for the opening titles of the CBC/Netflix series Anne with an E and in an important montage in Season 4 of Netflix's The Umbrella Academy.

On October 18, 2017, the day Tragically Hip lead singer Gord Downie's death was announced, "Ahead by a Century" was the single most played song on Canadian radio.

In 2026, CBC Music published a ranking of the top ten Tragically Hip songs to mark the tenth anniversary of the band's historic final performance, ranking "Ahead by a Century" at #1.

== Background ==
The song is one of several Tragically Hip singles which were developed from improvised bridge jams during live performances of one of the band's signature songs "New Orleans Is Sinking".

The song begins with an image of youthful romance, with a young boy and girl climbing a tree to talk and ponder all the possibilities that life holds for them. The original lyrics, which were performed at least once live before Downie rewrote them to their more familiar form, were more overtly sexual, with the boy and girl climbing the tree solely to touch each other's "cunt" and "cock". Downie subsequently explained that the intended theme was one of innocence — "It's two little kids, and they don't know what a cunt is and they don't know what a cock is—they just heard them called that" — but said that after he was convinced by the band's guitar technician that the audience would not hear that theme through the shock of the explicit terminology, he went through an intense but rewarding week-long process of rewriting the verse to communicate the idea in a more accessible way.

== Music video ==
The song's music video was directed by Eric Yealland and filmed on a small farm in Brooklin, Ontario. The music video won the award for Best Video at the 1996 MuchMusic Video Awards. The video was also nominated for "Best Video" at the 1997 Juno Awards.

== Covers ==
In 2016, Hey Rosetta! performed the song during their set at the CBC Music Festival, altering some lyrics to reflect Downie's recent announcement of his diagnosis with terminal glioblastoma. In the same year, the Toronto-based Choir! Choir! Choir! dedicated a performance of the song to Downie following the diagnosis.

On the January 1, 2017, edition of CBC Radio 2's The Strombo Show, a tribute special organized to celebrate the Tragically Hip's 30th anniversary, the song was performed by both By Divine Right as a standalone song, and Barenaked Ladies as a medley with the song "Chancellor" from Downie's solo album Coke Machine Glow. Following Downie's death, Barenaked Ladies added "Chancellor/Ahead by a Century" to the setlists for several shows on their concurrent concert tour.

In 2017, an Inuttitut-language version of the song, incorporating traditional Inuit throat singing, was released by the Nunavut-based folk music band The Jerry Cans.

At her concert at Toronto's Massey Hall during her Native Invader tour, on October 30, 2017, two weeks after Downie's death, Tori Amos performed the song. She indicated in her introduction that she had not previously known the song at all, but learned it for her Massey Hall performance as a special gift to her Canadian fans.

In 2022, set to a children's choir rendition, it was used by Canadian Tire for its 100th anniversary television commercial.

On September 5, 2024, it was one of three songs, alongside "Bobcaygeon" and "Grace, Too", performed by Choir! Choir! Choir! in a public singalong following the premiere of the documentary series The Tragically Hip: No Dress Rehearsal at the 2024 Toronto International Film Festival.

On April 24, 2026, City and Colour, Ruby Waters and Boi-1da released a cover as Canada’s 2026 FIFA World Cup Anthem.

== Track listing ==
All music is composed by The Tragically Hip.

No.	Title	Length
1.	"Ahead by a Century"	3:43
2.	"Put It Off"	5:11
Total length:		8:54

== Charts ==
=== Weekly charts ===
Chart (1996)	Peak position
Canada Hit Parade (The Record)	1
Canada Top Singles (RPM)	1
Canada Adult Contemporary (RPM)	14
Canada Rock/Alternative (RPM)	1

Chart (2016)	Peak position
Canada Hot 100 (Billboard)	32

=== Year-end charts ===
Chart (1996)	Position
Canada Top Singles (RPM)	6
Canada Adult Contemporary (RPM)	98
Canada Rock/Alternative (RPM)	12

=== Decade-end charts ===
Chart (1990–1999)	Position
Canada (Nielsen SoundScan)	99

== Certifications ==
Region	Certification	Certified units/sales
Canada (Music Canada)	5× Platinum	400,000^{‡}
^{‡} Sales+streaming figures based on certification alone.
