= Gift Shop (song) =

Single by The Tragically Hip

from the album Trouble at the Henhouse
- Released: June 1996
- Genre: Alternative rock
- Length: 4:57
- Label: MCA
- Songwriter(s): The Tragically Hip
- Producer(s): Mark Vreeken, The Tragically Hip

The Tragically Hip singles chronology
"Ahead by a Century" (1996)	"Gift Shop" (1996)	"700 Ft. Ceiling" (1996)

"Gift Shop" is a song by Canadian rock group The Tragically Hip. It was released in June 1996 as the second single from their fifth studio album, Trouble at the Henhouse. The song was a successful follow-up to the band's previous hit single "Ahead by a Century", peaking at No. 4 on Canada's RPM Singles Chart.

== Music video ==
The music video for "Gift Shop" was directed by Eric Yealland and filmed in Sedona, Arizona in July 1996.

The video reached #1 on MuchMusic Countdown for the week of September 20, 1996. The video also won the award for "Best Cinematography" at the 1997 MuchMusic Video Awards.

== Charts ==
=== Weekly charts ===
Chart (1996)	Peak position
Canadian RPM Singles Chart	4
Canadian RPM Alternative 30	17

=== Year-end charts ===
Chart (1996)	Position
Canada Top Singles (RPM)	48
