= Grace, Too =

Single by The Tragically Hip

from the album Day for Night
- Released: September 1994
- Genre: Rock
- Length: 5:34
- Label: MCA
- Songwriter: The Tragically Hip
- Producer: Mark Howard

The Tragically Hip singles chronology
"Fully Completely" (1993)	"Grace, Too" (1994)	"Greasy Jungle" (1994)

"Grace, Too" is a song by Canadian rock band The Tragically Hip. It was released in September 1994 as the lead single from their fourth studio album, Day for Night. The song peaked at number 11 on the RPM Canadian Singles chart.

== Live performances ==
On March 25, 1995, The Tragically Hip performed the song on Saturday Night Live after being introduced by Dan Aykroyd. Aykroyd, who is a fan of the band, had personally lobbied SNL showrunner Lorne Michaels to book them as a musical guest. On the show, Gord Downie notably flubbed the start of the song—rather than the normal opening lyric, "He said I'm fabulously rich", Downie sang it as "He said I'm tragically hip". The band later attributed the error to their pre-show use of marijuana. Subsequently during live performances, Downie frequently sang the opening line as "He said I'm tragically hip", often to applause from the crowd.

The band also opened their Woodstock 1999 performance with this song.

== Covers ==
In 2011, the song was covered by Selina Martin for the first Have Not Been the Same charity compilation.

Singer-songwriter Justin Rutledge covered the song for his 2014 album Daredevil, an album consisting entirely of Tragically Hip covers.

Following Downie's death in October 2017, country singer Dallas Smith performed the song during his concert at Kingston's K-Rock Centre on October 19.

On October 11, 2018, six days before the one-year anniversary of Downie's death, Johnny Fay and Rob Baker joined Choir! Choir! Choir! at Yonge-Dundas Square (now Sankofa Square) for a live performance of the song.

The song was covered by Twin Flames on their 2020 album Omen.

On September 5, 2024, it was one of three songs, alongside "Ahead by a Century" and "Bobcaygeon", performed by Choir! Choir! Choir! in a public singalong following the premiere of the documentary series The Tragically Hip: No Dress Rehearsal at the 2024 Toronto International Film Festival.

== Legacy ==
In 2026, CBC Music published a ranking of the top ten Tragically Hip songs to mark the tenth anniversary of the band's historic final performance, ranking "Grace, Too" at #6.

== Charts ==
=== Weekly charts ===
Chart (1994)	Peak position
Canadian RPM Singles Chart	11

Chart (2016)	Peak position
Canadian Billboard Digital Songs	19

=== Year-end charts ===
Chart (1994)	Position
Canada Top Singles (RPM)	67
