= Two Solitudes =

Two Solitudes may refer to:

- Two Solitudes (novel), a 1945 novel by Hugh MacLennan
- Canadian Classique or Two Solitudes Derby, soccer rivalry between clubs Toronto FC and CF Montréal, named after the novel
- Two Solitudes (film), 1978 motion picture written and directed by Lionel Chetwynd, based on the 1945 novel
- Two Solitudes (Canadian society), the relationship between English-speaking and French-speaking Canadians
- "Two Solitudes", a 1995 email story by Carl Steadman
- "Two Solitudes", a 1987 song by Level 42 on their album Running in the Family
