= Live at the Roxy (The Tragically Hip album) =

Live album by The Tragically Hip
- Released: June 24, 2022
- Recorded: May 3, 1991
- Venues: Roxy Theatre, Hollywood, California
- Genre: Rock
- Length: 77:22
- Label: Universal Music Canada
- Producer: Don Smith

The Tragically Hip chronology
Saskadelphia (2021)	Live at the Roxy (2022)

Professional ratings
Review scores
Source	Rating
American Songwriter	3.5/5 stars
Paste	(8.5/10)

Live at the Roxy or Live at the Roxy May 3 91 is the second full-length live album by Canadian rock band The Tragically Hip.

The album was recorded on May 3, 1991, at the Roxy Theatre in Hollywood, California. The album was released as a standalone album on June 24, 2022, after previously being included in the 30th anniversary box set edition of Road Apples, which was released on October 15, 2021.

The album features two songs which were previously released by the band as B-sides to singles in the Road Apples era: the ad-libbed "killer whale tank" version of "New Orleans Is Sinking", and the "double suicide" version of "Highway Girl".

== Track listing ==
All tracks are written by The Tragically Hip (Note: The Tragically Hip (EP) credits "Highway Girl" to Gord Downie and Bobby Baker, and "All Canadian Surf Club" to Gord Sinclair and Baker.)

Live at the Roxy track listing
No.	Title	Length
1.	"Little Bones"	4:43
2.	"She Didn't Know"	3:58
3.	"Twist My Arm"	3:53
4.	"Highway Girl"	7:37
5.	"Cordelia"	4:30
6.	"Trickle Down"	3:10
7.	"The Luxury"	4:01
8.	"Three Pistols"	3:38
9.	"Fight"	6:22
10.	"I'll Believe in You (Or I'll Be Leaving You Tonight)"	4:01
11.	"New Orleans Is Sinking"	8:48
12.	"On the Verge"	5:13
13.	"Long Time Running"	4:42
14.	"Blow at High Dough"	4:50
15.	"All Canadian Surf Club"	7:56
Total length:		77:22

== Personnel ==
- Gord Downie – lead vocals
- Rob Baker – lead guitar
- Paul Langlois – rhythm guitar, backing vocals
- Gord Sinclair – bass, backing vocals
- Johnny Fay – drums

== Charts ==
Chart performance for Live at the Roxy
Chart (2022)	Peak position
Belgian Albums (Ultratop Flanders)	89
Canadian Albums (Billboard)	5
