= Fully Completely =

Studio album by The Tragically Hip
- Released: October 6, 1992
- Recorded: August, 1992
- Studios: Battery, London
- Genre: Alternative rock
- Length: 46:47
- Label: MCA
- Producer: Chris Tsangarides

The Tragically Hip chronology
Road Apples (1991)	Fully Completely (1992)	Day for Night (1994)

Singles from Fully Completely
- 1. "Locked in the Trunk of a Car" Released: October 1992; 2. "Fifty Mission Cap" Released: January 1993; 3. "Courage (for Hugh MacLennan)" Released: February 1993; 4. "At the Hundredth Meridian" Released: April 1993; 5. "Looking for a Place to Happen" Released: 1993; 6. "Fully Completely" Released: 1993

Fully Completely is the third studio album by Canadian rock band The Tragically Hip. The album was released in October 1992 and produced by Chris Tsangarides. The album produced six singles: "Locked in the Trunk of a Car", "Fifty Mission Cap", "Courage (For Hugh MacLennan)", "At the Hundredth Meridian", "Looking for a Place to Happen", and "Fully Completely".

== Background ==
The Tragically Hip had released two full-length albums (Up To Here and Road Apples) before Fully Completely, working with producer Don Smith. While the albums had been successful in Canada, the Tragically Hip had not broken into the American market in a significant way. Hip guitarist Rob Baker later voiced the opinion that collaborating with the same producer on multiple projects (as the Hip had done with their first two albums) becomes troublesome because "little politics and intrigues enter into things". In late 1992, producer Chris Tsangarides had just completed production on an album by Concrete Blonde, and was eager to work with the Tragically Hip. MCA, responsible for the financial success of the album, favoured Tsangarides because of his proven ability to generate an American radio-friendly sound.

During production of the second album, singer Gord Downie had announced that he would no longer sing lyrics written by other members of the band. Fully Completely was the first album that would follow that decision by Downie.

== Recording and production ==
Fully Completely was recorded under the supervision of producer Chris Tsangarides at Battery Studios in London, England. In contrast to the band’s first two albums, the production techniques did not try to mimic what the band was performing on stage. Each track was built instrument by instrument over the course of five weeks, with only three days dedicated to vocals. The band expected recording in London to be a "grand experience," but had a mixed experience upon arriving. Some band members found the nights and weekends outside the studio to be, "dull and isolating". The art budget for the album was $30,000, and the total budget for the album was an estimated $185,000. The band has described the making of the album as being "about us wanting to learn".

== Album artwork ==
The cover art for Fully Completely was designed by Dutch artist Lieve Prins. Prins was given the idea of a "bacchanalian sort of scene – lots of decadence, decay and rebirth," by Hip guitarist Rob Baker, and was left to work with the idea. Prins also drew inspiration from I ching symbols and numbers. The final artwork was created using a Canon colour photocopier. The cover consists of 30 segmented photocopied images pasted together. The band was granted licensing privileges to the artwork, but Prins retained the ownership of the actual artwork. In the late 1990s, the Tragically Hip bought the piece from a gallery in Los Angeles. It now hangs prominently in their studio near Kingston, Ontario.

== Themes ==
The lyrics on Fully Completely are heavily centred on Canadian icons and history. Writer Rob Mitchell has described the album as, "a trippy Canadiana dream/nightmare – like The Odessy [sic] directed by Atom Egoyan". The title of the first track on the album, "Courage (for Hugh MacLennan)" makes reference to Canadian author Hugh MacLennan, and was inspired by his novel The Watch That Ends the Night. The second track, "Looking for a Place to Happen", deals with the subject of European encroachment and the eventual annexation of indigenous lands in North America, making specific reference to explorer Jacques Cartier. The third track, "At the Hundredth Meridian", references the line of longitude that separates much of Western Canada from the Central and Atlantic regions. The ninth track. "Fifty Mission Cap", references the life, career, and death of Toronto Maple Leafs player Bill Barilko, as well as fifty mission caps, which were provided to elite bomber pilots of the allied air forces during World War II. The tenth track, "Wheat Kings", is about David Milgaard, a man who was wrongfully convicted, and later exonerated, for the rape and murder of Gail Miller.

== Reception ==
Professional ratings
Review scores
Source	Rating
AllMusic	4.5/5 stars
Chicago Tribune	3/4 stars
Louder	3.5/5 stars
Pitchfork	9.4/10
Q	4/5 stars

Fully Completely was extremely well received in Canada. It had initial orders of 150,000 copies in Canada, and 200,000 in Canada by the end of three months. The Tragically Hip and their label, MCA, had high expectations for the U.S. release of Fully Completely. Gord Sinclair described in an interview that the band, "were still holding out for the equivalent American success". The success, however, did not happen. MCA stopped American promotion of Fully Completely after two weeks. Its success in Canada, however, was unquestionable. It reached No. 1 on the RPM Top 100 albums chart. The album is listed at no. 5 on The Top 100 Canadian Albums by Bob Mersereau and No. 9 on The Top 102 Modern Rock Albums of All Time by 102.1 The Edge. The album was certified Diamond in Canada in January 2007 for sales of 1,000,000 copies. Despite the Tragically Hip's great domestic success, this was the only album of theirs to be released in Japan. It was released there on April 21, 1993, with the catalogue number of MVCM-360.

At the 2017 Polaris Music Prize, the album won the public vote for the Heritage Prize in the 1986-1995 category.

== Tours ==
Rather than a normal tour, the Tragically Hip followed the release of Fully Completely with the organization of "Another Roadside Attraction", in 1993. Another Roadside Attraction was a travelling music and arts summer festival which promoted little known bands and travelled across Canada. In 2014 and 2015, the band held a 22nd anniversary tour in which they played the album from beginning to end during each show.

== Reissue ==
A remastered "deluxe edition" of the album was released in 2014. The reissue included two new tracks from the original recording sessions, as well as a second disc featuring a September 13, 1992, concert performance at the Horseshoe Tavern in Toronto. One of the new tracks, "Radio Show," was released as a single to promote the reissue and reached #29 on Canada's rock chart.

== Track listing ==
All tracks are written by The Tragically Hip.

No.	Title	Length
1.	"Courage (for Hugh MacLennan)"	4:27
2.	"Looking for a Place to Happen"	4:18
3.	"At the Hundredth Meridian"	3:20
4.	"Pigeon Camera"	4:34
5.	"Lionized"	3:20
6.	"Locked in the Trunk of a Car"	4:42
7.	"We'll Go Too"	3:24
8.	"Fully Completely"	3:32
9.	"Fifty Mission Cap"	4:10
10.	"Wheat Kings"	4:19
11.	"The Wherewithal"	2:55
12.	"Eldorado"	3:46

2014 re-issue bonus tracks
No.	Title	Length
13.	"Radio Show"	4:39
14.	"So Hard Done By"	2:57

2014 live disc
No.	Title	Length
1.	"At the Hundredth Meridian"	3:53
2.	"Fifty-Mission Cap"	4:10
3.	"We’ll Go Too"	3:56
4.	"Fully Completely"	3:54
5.	"Pigeon Camera"	4:32
6.	"Twist My Arm"	3:51
7.	"Lionized"	3:34
8.	"Wheat Kings"	4:07
9.	"Eldorado"	4:08
10.	"Looking for a Place to Happen"	4:51
11.	"Courage (For Hugh MacLennan)"	4:13
12.	"Locked in the Trunk of a Car"	4:53
13.	"The Wherewithal"	3:34

== Personnel ==
The Tragically Hip

- Gord Downie – vocals
- Bobby Baker – guitar
- Paul Langlois – guitar, vocals
- Johnny Fay – drums
- Gord Sinclair – bass, vocals

Production

- Chris Tsangarides – producer, engineering, mixing
- Chris 'Wood' Marshall – assistant engineer
- Ian Cooper – mastering

== Charts ==
=== Weekly charts ===
Weekly chart performance for Fully Completely
Chart (1992–1993)	Peak position
Australian Albums (ARIA)	96
Canada Top Albums/CDs (RPM)	1
Dutch Albums (Album Top 100)	72
US Heatseekers Albums (Billboard)	40

=== Year-end charts ===
Year-end chart performance for Fully Completely
Chart (2002)	Position
Canadian Alternative Albums (Nielsen SoundScan)	113

== Certifications ==
Region	Certification	Certified units/sales
Canada (Music Canada)	Diamond	1,000,000^{^}
^{^} Shipments figures based on certification alone.
