= Little Bones =

1991 single by the Tragically Hip

Single by The Tragically Hip

from the album Road Apples
- Released: 1991
- Recorded: September 1990
- Studio: Barris (New Orleans)
- Genre: Rock
- Length: 4:44
- Label: MCA
- Songwriter: The Tragically Hip
- Producer: Don Smith

The Tragically Hip singles chronology
"38 Years Old" (1990)	"Little Bones" (1991)	"Three Pistols" (1991)

"Little Bones" is a song by the Canadian rock band the Tragically Hip. It was released as the lead single from their second studio album, Road Apples, on which it appears as the opening track. The song was very successful in Canada, peaking at No. 11 on the RPM Singles chart.

== Background ==
The song was written in New Orleans during the recording of Road Apples. It was originally an acoustic guitar based song with music composed by bassist Gord Sinclair.

The inspiration behind the song's title came from when singer and lyricist Gord Downie read The Last of the Crazy People by Timothy Findley. The book featured a cat named Little Bones, which he thought would make a good song title. Months later, during the recording of Road Apples, Downie was reminded of this when he had a conversation with a cab driver who warned him about "little bones" in chicken. This would also inspire the chorus of the song.

== Track listing ==
All tracks are written by The Tragically Hip.

No.	Title	Length
1.	"Little Bones"	4:42
2.	"38 Years Old"	4:18
3.	"Blow at High Dough" (Live at the Roxy)	4:52
Total length:		13:52

== Charts ==
=== Weekly charts ===
Chart (1991)	Position
Canada Top Singles (RPM)	11

=== Year-end charts ===
Chart (1991)	Position
Canada Top Singles (RPM)	84
