= Locked in the Trunk of a Car =

Single by the Tragically Hip

from the album Fully Completely
- Released: October 1992
- Genre: Rock
- Length: 4:42
- Label: MCA
- Songwriter: the Tragically Hip
- Producer: Chris Tsangarides

The Tragically Hip singles chronology
"On the Verge" (1991)	"Locked in the Trunk of a Car" (1992)	"Fifty Mission Cap" (1992)

Alternative Cover

"Locked in the Trunk of a Car" is a song by Canadian rock band the Tragically Hip. It was released in October 1992 as the lead single from their third studio album, Fully Completely. The song peaked at No. 11 on Canada's RPM Singles Chart.

== Background ==
The song had been fully written and performed live a year before the recording of Fully Completely, although elements of the song date back even further. The intro riff was composed in the late 1980s by the band's bassist, Gord Sinclair, on an acoustic guitar, and lyrics that would end up part of the song date back to a story that Gord Downie told in a 1991 live performance of the song "Highway Girl," which was released as the B-Side to the single "Twist My Arm".

Many fans of the band have speculated that Gord Downie wrote the song about the kidnapping and murder of Pierre Laporte, the Minister of Labour in Quebec, by the FLQ during the October Crisis in 1970. This is because Laporte's corpse was found locked in the trunk of a car. Downie never confirmed this interpretation, and has stated that the lyrics are a metaphor.

== Music video ==
The music video for the song features a transition between the band playing on a soundstage and a man locked in a car trunk with his hands tied in rope, as another man (played by the band's road manager Dave Powell) drives the car around the Canadian Prairies. The video was directed by Peter Henderson and produced by Eric Yealland. Cinematographer was Sean Valentini.

The video won the award for "Best Video" at the 1993 Canadian Music Video Awards. The video was also nominated in the "Best Video" category at the 1993 Juno Awards.

== Covers ==
- Singer-songwriter Justin Rutledge covered the song for his 2014 album Daredevil, an album consisting entirely of Tragically Hip covers.
- Our Lady Peace performed a cover of the song during their 30th anniversary tour in 2025.

== Track listing ==
All tracks are written by the Tragically Hip.

No.	Title	Length
1.	"Locked in the Trunk of a Car"	4:38
2.	"Courage (for Hugh MacLennan)/Locked in the Trunk of a Car" (Live)	8:55
Total length:		13:33

== Charts ==
Chart (1992)	Peak position
Canadian RPM Singles Chart	11
