= Barometer Rising =

1941 romantic-realist novel by Hugh MacLennan

- First edition (US)
- Author: Hugh MacLennan
- Language: English
- Genre: Historical, romance
- Publisher: Duell, Sloan & Pearce
- Publication date: 1941
- Publication place: Canada
- Pages: 336
- ISBN: 978-0771034893

Barometer Rising is a romantic-realist novel by Canadian author Hugh MacLennan. The work explores life in Halifax, Nova Scotia during World War I, and its interruption by the Halifax explosion. The narrative predominantly follows and pivots upon the romantic life of Penny Wain.

The book had been difficult to publish as MacLennan had previously written regarding international themes, while Barometer Rising contained a decidedly nationalist overtone. Once published, the novel was wildly successful, and permitted MacLennan to leave his full-time job at Lower Canada College.

The novel, with afterword by Alistair MacLeod, ranks among the books which compose the New Canadian Library.

== Background ==
Dorothy Duncan, Hugh MacLennan's wife, convinced him that the failure of his first two novels arose from not truly knowing the setting, as one had been set in Europe and the other in the United States. She encouraged him to write about Canada, the country he knew best. She told him that "Nobody's going to understand Canada until she evolves a literature of her own, and you're the fellow to start bringing Canadian novels up to date." Barometer Rising became Hugh MacLennan's first published novel. He drew upon his own experiences of the Halifax Explosion, having survived it as ten-year-old boy, but also on Homer's Odyssey for narrative direction.

Prior to MacLennan's novel, there had been no real tradition of Canadian literature; he sought to define Canada for Canadians through a national novel.

== Plot summary ==
The novel takes place during the week of the Halifax Explosion - 2 December 1917 to 10 December 1917.

Penelope Wain believes that her cousin, Neil Macrae, has been killed while serving overseas under her father, Colonel Geoffrey Wain. The family is under the impression that Neil had died in the disgrace of desertion. Neil, however, had not died, but has returned to Halifax to clear his name of its tarnish. Neil seeks Alec MacKenzie, the only other survivor of their unit who can confirm that Colonel Wain had given an contradictory order, which was impossible to fulfill. When the order ended in disaster, Colonel Wain attempted to blame Neil in hopes of retaining his position in the military. Yet, prior to the court martial, Neil was believed to have died in artillery strike. Colonel Wain was forced to return to Canada as a transportation officer.

In Halifax, the war has given Penny the opportunity to become a successful naval architect at the Halifax Shipyard. She develops a friendship with Angus Murray, a doctor wounded from the war. Angus eventually proposes marriage to Penny; she defers the proposal. While her father, Colonel Wain, disapproves of Angus, he warms up to him after learning that Neil is alive and in Halifax. Neil and Penny had also been lovers and Angus realizes that Colonel Wain is desperate to ensure that Neil is not court martialed and given an opportunity to clarify the occurrences overseas. The colonel had been offered a new position in the war, and the trial will ruin his promotion.

Penny and Neil are briefly reunited, but Penny finds herself unable to reveal that she has given birth to their daughter, Jean, after their affair in Montreal. Jean had been adopted and cared for by her aunt and uncle. Angus intrudes upon the reunion to warn Neil of the colonel's intentions. Neil leaves to find Alec, who is willing to testify in Neil's defence, despite the colonel providing Alec with a job at the shipyard. The men are later joined by Angus, who also agrees to testify in favour of Neil.

On the following morning, the Halifax Explosion occurs. The blast kills several characters, including Penny's aunt and uncle.

Neil and Murray manage to rescue Alec and his wife from their house, although Alec had sustained grievous injury. Once the two men locate Penny, who had been wounded in the eye, Angus sets up a makeshift hospital at the Wains' house. Meanwhile, Neil enters the city to procure supplies and assist with rescue efforts, no longer concerned who will recognize him. Neil, however, is shocked when he finds Colonel Wain's dead body in the wreckage of the explosion. Although Alec dies from his injuries, he and Murray acquire an affidavit with a testimony to clear Neil's name. When Penny had recovered sufficiently from her injury and her surgery, she goes with Neil to retrieve Jean.

== Influence ==
In Hugo MacPherson's 1958 preface, he describes Barometer Rising as "a major weather sign in the history of Canadian writing", which spurred the most productive period in Canadian writing.

== Potential film adaptation ==
Crawley Films Limited of Ottawa bought the film rights to Barometer Rising by February 1962 with the intent of making it into a feature-film adaptation.

== See also ==
- A Romance of the Halifax Disaster
- Literature of Nova Scotia
