= 1948 Governor General's Awards =

Canadian literary award

The 1948 Governor General's Awards for Literary Merit were the 13th rendition of the Governor General's Awards, Canada's annual national awards program which then comprised literary awards alone. The awards recognized Canadian writers for new English-language works published in Canada during 1948 and were presented early in 1949. There were no cash prizes.

As every year from 1942 to 1948, there two awards for non-fiction, and four awards in the three established categories, which recognized English-language works only.

== Winners ==
- Fiction: Hugh MacLennan, The Precipice
- Poetry or drama: A. M. Klein, The Rocking Chair and Other Poems
- Non-fiction: Thomas H. Raddall, Halifax, Warden of the North
- Non-fiction: C. P. Stacey, The Canadian Army, 1939-1945
