= Two Solitudes (Canadian society) =

Gap between Canadian Anglophones and Francophones

"Two Solitudes" (French: deux solitudes) refers to a perceived lack of communication and lack of will to communicate between Anglophone and Francophone people in Canada. The term was popularized by Hugh MacLennan's novel Two Solitudes.

== Etymology ==
MacLennan derived the term from the Austrian poet Rilke. As part of Letters to a Young Poet, Rilke wrote that: “Love consists in this, that two solitudes protect and touch and greet each other.”

== In politics ==
- In her 2005 investiture speech as Governor-General of Canada, Michaëlle Jean stated that "the time of 'two solitudes' had finished".
