= Road Apples (album) =

Studio album by The Tragically Hip
- Released: February 19, 1991
- Recorded: September 1990
- Studios: Barris, New Orleans
- Genres: Roots rock; alternative rock; folk rock; blues rock
- Length: 49:09
- Label: MCA
- Producer: Don Smith

The Tragically Hip chronology
Up to Here (1989)	Road Apples (1991)	Fully Completely (1992)

Singles from Road Apples
- 1. "Little Bones" Released: 1991; 2. "Three Pistols" Released: 1991; 3. "Twist My Arm" Released: June 1991; 4. "Long Time Running" Released: 1991; 5. "On the Verge" Released: 1991; 6. "Cordelia" Released: 1991

Professional ratings
Review scores
Source	Rating
AllMusic	4/5 stars
PopMatters	(8.5/10)

Road Apples is the second studio album by Canadian rock band The Tragically Hip, released on February 19, 1991. The album contains the hit singles "Three Pistols", “Little Bones,” and “Twist My Arm." The album was a commercial success, being the first album by the band to hit No. 1 and achieving diamond certification in Canada.

== Background ==
Recording sessions were held at the Daniel Lanois' personal studio in New Orleans in September 1990 on the recommendation of Colin Cripps, at the time a member of the band Crash Vegas. He said that the studio had helped establish the mood for the album Red Earth.

The album would be the first in which all of the lyrics were written by vocalist Gord Downie. This was because Downie believed his vocal performances would be more authentic if he sang his own words.

Lyrics on the album contains references to many prominent figures, including Tom Thomson and Jacques Cousteau, as well as political situations in Sault Ste. Marie, Ontario. The track “Fiddler's Green" was written for Gord Downie's young nephew, who died during the writing of the album. Because of the personal nature of the song, the Hip did not play it live often, but they played it regularly during their final tour.

== Title ==
The name of the album is a Canadian slang term for horse droppings; with allusion to the fact that along the side of a road they can be found in shape and size of apples. The album's original working title was Saskadelphia, but this was rejected by the record label as likely to confuse listeners; however, the title was later reused for a 2021 EP of previously unreleased rarities from the Road Apples sessions.

== Commercial performance ==
Road Apples sold 102,000 copies in its first ten days of release. It became the band's first album to reach No. 1 in Canada. The album has been certified Diamond in Canada.

== Legacy ==
During the Hip's last tour, in 2016, songs from this album were played live on a regular basis, featuring the above-mentioned songs as well as ”Long Time Running”, “Last of the Unplucked Gems”, “The Luxury”, and “Fiddler's Green.”

A deluxe edition of the album was reissued in 2021 to mark its 30th anniversary. The reissue included a remastered version of the original album, the six-song Saskadelphia EP, a live concert performance recorded at the Roxy Theatre in 1991, and a disc of outtakes and demo versions of the album's songs.

The Roxy Theatre live disc was also separately released as the live album Live at the Roxy in 2022.

== Track listing ==
All tracks are written by The Tragically Hip.

No.	Title	Length
1.	"Little Bones"	4:45
2.	"Twist My Arm"	3:56
3.	"Cordelia"	4:10
4.	"The Luxury"	3:40
5.	"Born in the Water"	3:25
6.	"Long Time Running"	4:23
7.	"Bring It All Back"	4:41
8.	"Three Pistols"	3:48
9.	"Fight"	5:59
10.	"On the Verge"	3:54
11.	"Fiddler's Green"	4:25
12.	"The Last of the Unplucked Gems"	2:03

== Personnel ==
The Tragically Hip

- Gord Downie – lead vocals
- Bobby Baker – lead guitar
- Paul Langlois – rhythm guitar, backing vocals
- Gord Sinclair – bass guitar, backing vocals
- Johnny Fay – drums

Additional musicians

- Phil Jones – tambourine
- Benmont Tench – piano
- Malcolm Burn – accordion

Technical personnel

- Bruce Barris – recording, mixing
- Don Smith – mixing
- Scott Campbell – assistant engineer
- Ted Jensen – mastering

== Certifications ==
Region	Certification	Certified units/sales
Canada (Music Canada)	Diamond	1,000,000^{‡}
^{‡} Sales+streaming figures based on certification alone.
