= 38 Years Old =

Single by The Tragically Hip

from the album Up to Here
- Released: April 1990
- Studio: Ardent (Memphis, Tennessee)
- Genre: Folk rock
- Length: 4:18
- Label: MCA
- Songwriters: Rob Baker; Gordon Downie; Johnny Fay; Paul Langlois; Gord Sinclair
- Producer: Don Smith

The Tragically Hip singles chronology
"Boots or Hearts" (1990)	"38 Years Old" (1990)	"Little Bones" (1991)

"38 Years Old" is a song by Canadian rock band The Tragically Hip. It was released in April 1990 as the fourth single from the band's first full-length studio album, Up to Here. The song peaked at No. 41 on the Canadian RPM singles chart.

== Content ==
The song is a fictional account of the real-life escape of 14 inmates from Millhaven Institution near the band's hometown of Kingston, Ontario, on July 10, 1972. The date of the event and the number of escapees mentioned in the song are historically incorrect ("12 men broke loose in '73...").

Lyrically, the song is written from the perspective of the younger brother of one of the escapees, a man who murdered the man who raped their sister.

== Background ==
The song was written in Memphis during their recording of Up to Here. The main riff was written and performed by bassist Gord Sinclair on an acoustic guitar whose B and high E strings were detuned by a whole step. Guitarist Paul Langlois played bass on the recording.

Though it is one of The Tragically Hip's most popular songs, the band seldom played the song live. In Michael Barclay's 2018 book The Never-Ending Present: The Story of Gord Downie and the Tragically Hip, the band's reticence to play the song live is attributed to a misperception among some of the band's fans that the song was autobiographical: because its emotional climax hinges on the moment when the narrator opens the window for "my older brother Mike", some fans have erroneously assumed that Gord Downie's real brother, documentary filmmaker Mike Downie, was himself a prisoner and one of the escapees from Millhaven.

== Charts ==
Chart (1990)	Peak position
Canadian RPM Singles Chart	41
