= New Orleans Is Sinking =

Single by the Tragically Hip

from the album Up to Here
- Released: November 1989
- Studio: Ardent (Memphis, Tennessee)
- Genre: Rock, blues rock
- Length: 4:17
- Label: MCA
- Songwriter: The Tragically Hip
- Producer: Don Smith

The Tragically Hip singles chronology
| "Blow at High Dough" (1989) | "New Orleans Is Sinking" (1989) | "Boots or Hearts" (1990) |

Music video
- "New Orleans Is Sinking" on YouTube

"New Orleans Is Sinking" is a song by Canadian rock band the Tragically Hip. It was released in November 1989 as the second single from the band's first full-length studio album, Up to Here. The song reached number-one on the RPM Canadian Content chart. It was also the band's first song to chart in the United States.

The song is one of the band's signature songs and still receives consistent radio airplay in Canada.

== Background ==
The song was born out of a jam session the band had in their rehearsal space in Kingston in the late 1980s. They were playing the song "Shakin' All Over", which after about 20 minutes morphed into what would become "New Orleans Is Sinking". Gord Downie wrote the lyrics to the song about a trip he took to New Orleans while in university.

== Live "workshop" ==
When performed upon a stage, the middle section of the song was typically given over to an extended jam in which lead singer Gord Downie would perform a story or another song. The most famous such version, commonly referred to as "Killer Whale Tank", featured Downie improvising an extended story about working as a cleaner in the killer whale tank at an aquarium. It first appeared as a B-side on the band's 1991 CD single for "Long Time Running"; in 2022, it was featured on the live album Live at the Roxy.

In another well-known version which has been widely circulated as a live bootleg, Downie performed Joni Mitchell's "This Flight Tonight"; in the version which appears on the band's 1997 live album Live Between Us, he performed David Bowie's "China Girl" and The Beach Boys' "Don't Worry Baby".

This tradition has also been used by The Hip as a "workshop" to test out and develop new songs which have not yet been recorded; several of the band's later singles, including "Nautical Disaster" and "Ahead by a Century", began as bridge jams during live performances of "New Orleans Is Sinking".

== Legacy ==
In a 2000 poll conducted by the music magazine Chart, "New Orleans Is Sinking" was voted the seventh-greatest Canadian song of all time. In 2005, it was named the 16th greatest Canadian song of all time on the CBC Radio One series 50 Tracks: The Canadian Version. In 2008, the song was ranked No. 24 on a CFNY-FM (102.1 "The Edge") list of the Top 200 New Rock Songs of All Time. From 2005 to 2016, "New Orleans Is Sinking" was the second best-selling digitally downloaded 1980s song by a Canadian artist in Canada and the best-selling digitally downloaded 1980s song by a Canadian band in Canada.

In October 2005, several radio stations, including CKQB-FM and CHEZ-FM, temporarily stopped playing the song out of sensitivity to the victims of Hurricane Katrina, which had devastated the city of New Orleans in early September of that year.

== Track listing ==
All tracks are written by The Tragically Hip.

Side A
| No. | Title | Length |
|---|---|---|
| 1. | "New Orleans Is Sinking" | 4:16 |

Side B
| No. | Title | Length |
|---|---|---|
| 2. | "Trickle Down" | 3:10 |
| Total length: | | 7:26 |

== Charts ==
| Chart (1989/1990) | Peak position |
|---|---|
| Canadian RPM Singles Chart | 70 |
| RPM Canadian Content Chart | 1 |
| U.S. Billboard Mainstream Rock Tracks | 30 |
