= David Milgaard =

Wrongfully convicted Canadian (1952–2022)

- Born: July 7, 1952; Winnipeg, Manitoba, Canada
- Died: May 15, 2022 (aged 69); Calgary, Alberta, Canada
- Occupations: Public speaker; support worker
- Known for: Wrongful murder conviction
- Spouse: Cristina Milgaard
- Children: 2
- Parents: Joyce Milgaard; Lorne Milgaard

David Edgar Milgaard (July 7, 1952 – May 15, 2022) was a Canadian man who was wrongfully convicted for the 1969 rape and murder of nursing student Gail Miller in Saskatoon and imprisoned for 23 years. He was eventually released and exonerated. Up until his death, he lived in Alberta and was employed as a community support worker. Milgaard was also a public speaker who advocated for the wrongfully convicted and for all prisoners' rights.

== Arrest, trial and exoneration ==
In January 1969, 16-year-old Milgaard and his friends Ron Wilson and Nichol John embarked on a trip across Canada. The three were in Saskatoon, Saskatchewan, visiting their friend Albert Cadrain when a 20-year-old nursing student, Gail Miller, was found dead on a snowbank in the vicinity of the Cadrain home. Under pressure to solve a crime that had generated significant publicity, police focused their attention on Milgaard, Wilson and John. In an attempt to clear his name and assist the investigation, Milgaard turned himself in to police in Prince George, British Columbia. Police sent him back to Saskatoon, where he was charged with Miller's murder. Milgaard's friends John and Wilson were coerced by police into giving false statement. Cadrain later testified that he had seen Milgaard return the night of Miller's murder in blood-stained clothing. Wilson and John told police they had been with him the entire day and they believed him to be innocent, but changed their stories after police threatened them with prosecution if they did not cooperate.

With Cadrain, John and Wilson's testimony, then-17-year-old Milgaard was convicted of murder and sentenced to life in prison on January 31, 1970, exactly a year after Miller's murder. In 1971, Milgaard's appeal was rejected by the Saskatchewan Court of Appeal, and the Supreme Court of Canada declined to hear his appeal. Milgaard later wrote of the hardships he faced in prison, where he was raped and later attempted suicide..

=== Exoneration ===
Milgaard's lawyers and his mother, Joyce, worked for many years on clearing his name. A formal application for appeal was completed in 1988, but was not considered until 1991 when the federal government submitted a reference question to the Supreme Court of Canada, which recommended Milgaard's conviction be set aside. Kim Campbell, the federal minister of justice at the time, ordered that pursuant to section 690 of the Criminal Code, a new trial be held on the murder charge against Milgaard. However, the government of Saskatchewan announced it would not do so, instead entering a stay of proceedings in the case against Milgaard, releasing him from prison on April 16, 1992.

On July 18, 1997, a DNA laboratory in the United Kingdom released a report confirming that semen samples on the victim's clothing did not originate from Milgaard, effectively exonerating Milgaard of the crime.

On May 17, 1999, the governments of Canada and Saskatchewan announced that a settlement had been reached with Milgaard, and that he would be paid C$10 million compensation for pain and suffering, lost wages and legal fees.

=== Inquiry ===
On September 30, 2003, the Saskatchewan government announced a royal commission would investigate Milgaard's wrongful conviction. On February 20, 2004, Justice Edward P. MacCallum was announced as the commissioner.

On September 26, 2008, the Saskatchewan Minister of Justice, Don Morgan, released the findings of the Milgaard inquiry. Among its recommendations were a call for the federal government to create an independent body to review allegations of wrongful conviction. The report noted that if such a body had existed, Milgaard might have been released from jail years earlier than he actually was. Linda Fisher, ex-wife of Larry Fisher, visited the Saskatoon police department in 1980. She told the police that she believed her former husband had likely killed Miller. The Saskatoon police department did not follow up on her statement. The inquiry report released by MacCallum states that, "while MacCallum noted that Milgaard's family members mounted a formidable public awareness campaign, their efforts also created tension and resentment within the police and the Crown's office."

=== Real killer ===
The DNA evidence that exonerated Milgaard led police to Larry Earl Fisher (August 21, 1949 – June 10, 2015), who was renting the basement of the Cadrain family home in January 1969. Fisher was arrested on July 25, 1997, in Calgary and convicted of Miller's murder on November 22, 1999. Fisher, who had previously served a total of 23 years for numerous rapes committed in Manitoba and Saskatchewan, was handed a life sentence. The Court of Appeal for Saskatchewan unanimously denied the appeal of his conviction in September 2003.

Fisher was eligible for parole on multiple occasions, but opted not to have his case heard by the National Parole Board. He died on June 10, 2015, at the Pacific Institution in Abbotsford, British Columbia.

== Life after release ==
After his release, Milgaard married his partner Cristina. Together, they had two children, a son and a daughter. As of January 2020, Milgaard was living in Cochrane, Alberta. In 2021 he posted several videos on his YouTube channel Project Milgaard. He had recently been appointed to the Independent Review Board Working Group, an entity whose creation was ordered by Prime Minister Justin Trudeau in December 2019. A news item stated that "he has helped in the fight for the creation of a review board for cases of wrongful conviction."

Milgaard became ill on May 14, 2022. He was taken to a hospital in Calgary, where he died the following day at the age of 69 from complications of pneumonia.

== Legacy ==
In February 2023, Justice Minister David Lametti introduced a bill called the "David and Joyce Milgaard's Law" which would create a new, independent commission to investigate potential wrongful conviction cases and refer them back to the justice system.

== In popular culture ==
The Milgaard case has been the subject of two movies: the 1992 documentary The David Milgaard Story, directed by Vic Sarin, and the 1999 docudrama Milgaard, directed by Stephen Williams and starring Ian Tracey.

The song "Wheat Kings" by the Tragically Hip (from their 1992 album Fully Completely) contains references to the story.

Canadian artist David Collier described the Milgaard case in comics form in his 2000 book Surviving Saskatoon.

== See also ==
- List of miscarriage of justice cases
- Overturned convictions in Canada
