= The Sweet Hereafter (soundtrack) =

- OST CD cover

Soundtrack album by Mychael Danna with The Toronto Consort & David Fallis
- Released: November 18, 1997
- Studio: CBC Studio 44
- Genre: Early Music
- Length: 51:37
- Label: Virgin Records
- Producer: Ron Searles

The Sweet Hereafter is the soundtrack album to Atom Egoyan's 1997 film The Sweet Hereafter.

== Track listing ==
The album contains composer Mychael Danna's score, with several songs featuring lyrics and vocals by actress Sarah Polley.

#	Track	By
1	"The Sweet Hereafter"	Danna and Polley
2	"Procession"	Danna
3	"One More Colour"	Jane Siberry and Polley
4	"Bus"	Danna
5	"Bus Stop"	Danna and Graham Gouldman
6	"Courage (for Hugh MacLennan)"	The Tragically Hip and Polley
7	"It's Important That We Talk"	Danna
8	"Dog Track Drizzle"	Danna
9	"Thin Ice"	Danna
10	"It Was a Wonderful Time in Our Lives"	Danna
11	"Pied Piper"	Danna
12	"A Huge Wave"	Danna
13	"Boy"	Danna and Polley
14	"Why I Lied"	Danna
15	"A Different Town"	Danna

== Background ==
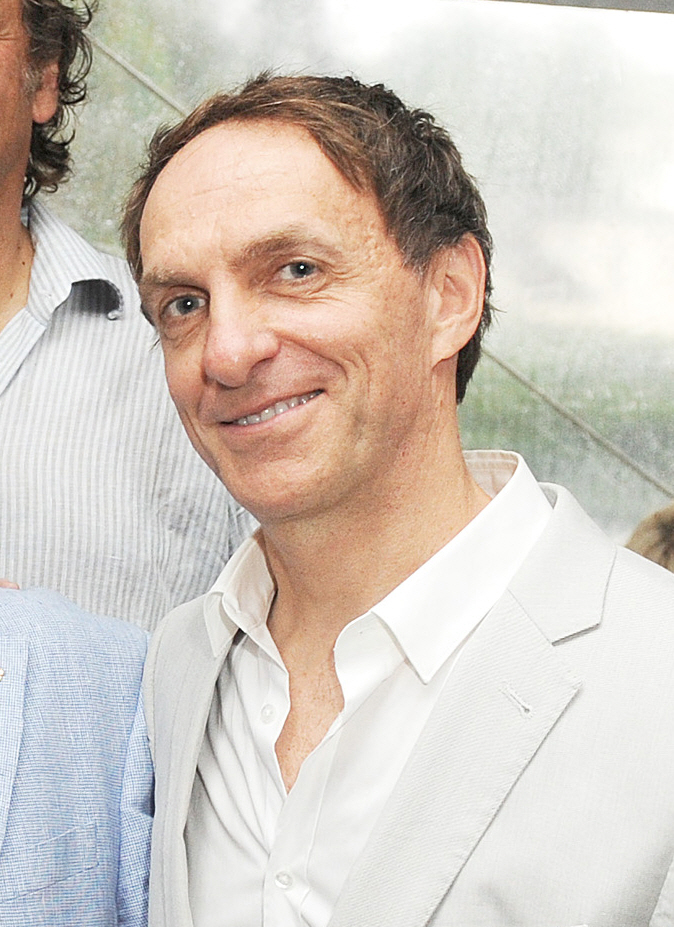
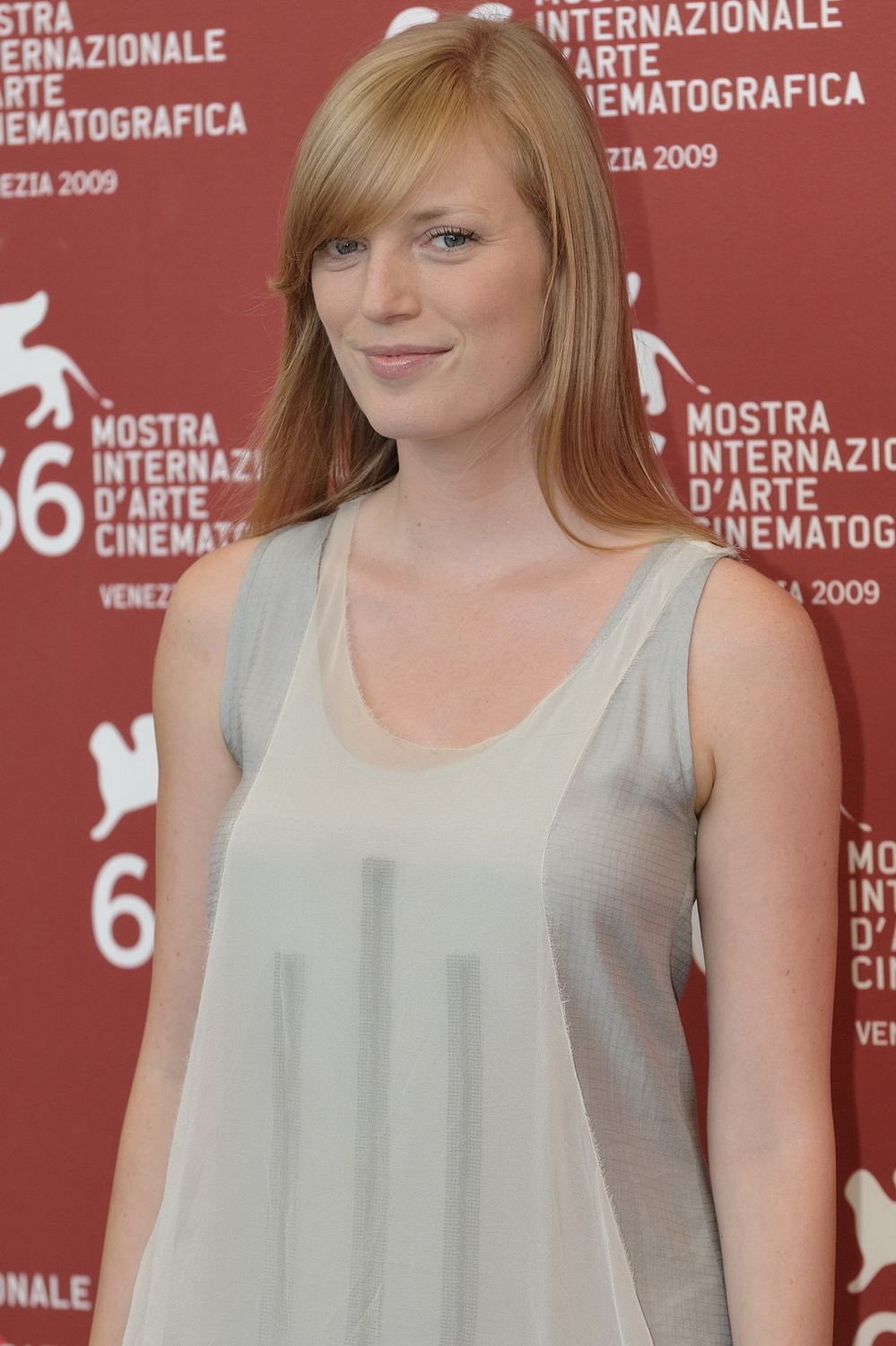
Mychael Danna, left, arranged popular Canadian songs which actress Sarah Polley performed, and the two worked together to create original songs.

The film makes references to The Pied Piper of Hamelin by Robert Browning, which influenced composer Mychael Danna's music. He used a Persian ney flute along with old instruments such as recorders, crumhorns and lutes, creating "a pseudo-medieval score" which was performed by the Toronto Consort, conducted by David Fallis. The ney performer is Persian music teacher Hossein Omoumi. The score thus combined Danna's interests in old and exotic music. Egoyan stated medieval-style music was used to make the film feel timeless, evoking Brothers Grimm fairy tales and avoiding the feel of a TV movie.

Polley's character, Nicole, is an aspiring singer before the accident, and is seen on stage performing the Tragically Hip's "Courage (for Hugh MacLennan)" and Jane Siberry's "One More Colour". Danna and Polley cooperated to create Nicole's music, with Polley writing lyrics to Danna's original songs and with Danna arranging the adaptations of "Courage" and "One More Colour". The songs were chosen because of their domestic popularity, reinforcing the local nature of Nicole's music. The Tragically Hip's original version of "Courage" also appears in the film.

== Release ==
The album was released in Canada by Virgin Music Canada, selling 7,000 copies by May 1998. The album was also released by Virgin Records in the United States, United Kingdom and Europe. By October, the album had sold 25,000 copies worldwide, bringing in a profit for Virgin Records given the inexpensive production.

== Reception ==
Professional ratings
Review scores
Source	Rating
Uncut	2/5 stars

Gramophone magazine gave the soundtrack a positive review, writing "A dreamy piece for keyboards, as well as other delicate atmospheres, makes the viewer/listener aware of the transforming power of grief". Gramophone also stated "Polley’s plaintive, beautiful soprano voice is a real find".

MTV wrote "the soundtrack, which also includes Polley's cover of Toronto singer-songwriter Jane Siberry's 'One More Colour,' plus an original score by Canadian composer Mychael Danna, provides positive counterbalances to the bleak images on the film".
