= Fifty Mission Cap =

Single by The Tragically Hip

from the album Fully Completely
- Released: January 1993
- Recorded: Battery Studios (London)
- Genre: Rock
- Length: 4:10
- Label: MCA
- Songwriters: Rob Baker; Gordon Downie; Johnny Fay; Paul Langlois; Gord Sinclair
- Producer: Chris Tsangarides

The Tragically Hip singles chronology
"Locked in the Trunk of a Car" (1992)	"Fifty Mission Cap" (1993)	"Courage" (1993)

"Fifty Mission Cap" is a song by Canadian rock group The Tragically Hip. It was released in January 1993 as the second single from the band's third full-length album, Fully Completely. It was first played in front of a live concert audience at Maple Leaf Gardens in Toronto on December 16, 1991.

The song is a tribute to Toronto Maple Leafs defenceman Bill Barilko, introducing Barilko's story to a younger generation, and is among The Tragically Hip's most popular songs.

== Content ==
The song's lyrics describe the mysterious disappearance of Barilko, who scored the Stanley Cup-clinching goal for the Leafs over Montreal Canadiens in the 1951 cup finals. Four months and five days later, Barilko departed on a fishing trip in a small, single-engine airplane with friend and dentist, Henry Hudson. The plane disappeared between Rupert House and Timmins, Ontario, leaving no trace of Barilko or Hudson.

Eleven years later, on June 7, 1962, helicopter pilot Ron Boyd discovered the plane wreckage roughly 100 kilometres (62 mi) north of Cochrane, Ontario, about 35 miles off-course. Barilko was finally buried in his home town of Timmins, the same year that the Maple Leafs won their next Stanley Cup.

In early press coverage of Fully Completely, Downie described the Barilko incident as "an Amelia Earhart story, except everyone's heard of Amelia Earhart."

The song's lyrics and title also reference a military cap, which became known as a 50 mission cap, and crush cap during World War II. The "fifty mission cap" or "crush cap" was just a standard issue military peaked cap, still widely used by modern military forces. These were worn by both fighter pilots and bomber crews. The terms "50 mission cap" and "crush cap" came from the look these caps gained after much wear. The wire crown stiffener was removed to allow the top of the hat to "crush" so headphones could be worn in the cockpit. The aged and worn look of the cap was thus a status symbol, and according to Downie the intended theme in the lyrics was that junior pilots would work their caps in to look like fifty mission caps, "so as to appear that you had more experience than you really did".

The line "I stole this from a hockey card" references card No. 340 from the 1991 NHL Pro Set hockey card series, which tells the story of Bill Barilko.

== Impact ==
The song's influence on public awareness of Barilko's story was such that the band were devoted an entire chapter in the 2004 book 67: The Maple Leafs, Their Sensational Victory, and the End of an Empire. The song remains a staple part of the warm-up playlist at every Maple Leafs home game, and the Leafs have a framed, handwritten copy of Gord Downie's lyrics to the song in their private players' lounge. Whenever the band played the Air Canada Centre, Barilko's retired-number banner would be frequently spotlighted during the concert, and when Downie died on October 17, 2017, the team incorporated Barilko's banner into its Downie tribute.

In 2017, TSN aired the short documentary film The Mission, profiling a project to recover the remaining wreckage of Barilko's plane; the film took its title from "Fifty Mission Cap", and it thematically touched on the song's role in Barilko's story. The film received a Canadian Screen Award nomination for Best Sports Feature Segment at the 6th Canadian Screen Awards in 2018.

In 2026, CBC Music published a ranking of the top ten Tragically Hip songs to mark the tenth anniversary of the band's historic final performance, ranking "Fifty Mission Cap" at #8.

== Charts ==
Chart (1993)	Peak position
Canadian RPM Singles Chart	40
