= At the Hundredth Meridian =

Single by The Tragically Hip

from the album Fully Completely
- Released: April 1993
- Recorded: 1992
- Genre: Rock
- Label: MCA
- Songwriters: Rob Baker; Gordon Downie; Johnny Fay; Paul Langlois; Gord Sinclair
- Producer: Chris Tsangarides

The Tragically Hip singles chronology
"Courage (for Hugh MacLennan)" (1993)	"At the Hundredth Meridian" (1993)	"Looking for a Place to Happen" (1993)

"At the Hundredth Meridian" is a song by Canadian rock band The Tragically Hip. It was released in April 1993 as the fourth single from the band's 1992 album, Fully Completely. The song peaked at No. 18 on the Canadian RPM Singles chart. The song was also featured in the Due South episode "Heaven and Earth" in 1995.

When performing the song live, the band would often play it at a significantly faster tempo than on the album, and would use the instrumental break for a jam session lasting several minutes.

== Content ==
The song is a reference to the 100th meridian west, which is a line of longitude that separates much of Western Canada from the Central and Atlantic regions of Canada and is where the Great Plains begin, as lead-singer Gord Downie states in the song.

== Music video ==
The music video for "At the Hundredth Meridian" was directed by Peter Henderson. It was filmed in Melbourne during the band's tour of Australia and New Zealand in March 1993.

In the video, Downie is wearing a ball-cap advertising Gros Morne National Park, located in the Canadian province of Newfoundland and Labrador.

The video reached No. 1 on MuchMusic Countdown for the week of June 18, 1993.

== Personnel ==
- Gord Downie – vocals
- Bobby Baker – guitar
- Paul Langlois – guitar, vocals
- Johnny Fay – drums
- Gord Sinclair – bass, vocals

== Charts ==
Chart (1993)	Peak position
Canadian RPM Singles Chart	18
US Radio & Records AOR Chart	34
