= Saskadelphia =

EP by The Tragically Hip
- Released: May 21, 2021
- Recorded: September 1990; December 7, 2000
- Venue: Molson Centre, (Montreal)
- Studio: Kingsway (New Orleans)
- Genre: Rock
- Length: 19:16
- Label: Universal
- Producer: Don Smith; The Tragically Hip

The Tragically Hip chronology
Man Machine Poem (2016)	Saskadelphia (2021)	Live at the Roxy (2022)

Singles from Saskadelphia
- 1. "Ouch" Released: 2021; 2. "Not Necessary" Released: 2021; 3. "Montreal" Released: 2021

Saskadelphia is an EP by Canadian rock band The Tragically Hip, released on May 21, 2021.

The band's first release since the death of lead singer Gord Downie in 2017, the EP consists of six previously unreleased tracks connected to the recording sessions for their 1991 album Road Apples.

Its first single, "Ouch", reached #3 on the Canadian Rock song chart.

Saskadelphia had been the original working title of Road Apples during the recording sessions, but was rejected by the band's record label. Five of the six songs on the album are the original studio recordings, while one song is included in a later live performance as the original studio version could not be found. All six recordings were among those the band rediscovered only in 2019 after a New York Times Magazine article listed the band as being among those artists whose master tapes had been lost in the 2008 Universal Studios fire, leading to the discovery that their tapes were actually safe as they had been transferred back to Canada many years earlier. The title is a portmanteau of Saskatchewan and Philadelphia.

The lead single "Ouch" was promoted with a music video starring Rick Mercer and Jay Baruchel. A subsequent video for "Not Necessary" starred Emily Hampshire. An animated video for "Montreal" paid tribute to the victims of the 1989 École Polytechnique massacre, and was released on December 6, 2021 to commemorate the anniversary of the event.

The EP was also included as part of the Road Apples 30th anniversary reissue package in October 2021.

== Track listing ==
All tracks are written by The Tragically Hip.

No.	Title	Length
1.	"Ouch"	3:10
2.	"Not Necessary"	3:01
3.	"Montreal" (Live from the Molson Centre, Montreal, Dec 7th, 2000)	3:49
4.	"Crack My Spine (Like a Whip)"	3:11
5.	"Just as Well"	2:35
6.	"Reformed Baptist Blues"	3:30
Total length:		19:16

== Personnel ==
Personnel taken from Saskadelphia liner notes.

The Tragically Hip

- Rob Baker – guitar
- Gord Downie – vocals
- Johnny Fay – drums
- Paul Langlois – guitar, vocals
- Gord Sinclair – bass, vocals

Additional performers

- Chris Brown – organ on "Montreal"
- Kate Fenner – vocals on "Montreal"

Technical personnel

- The Tragically Hip – production on "Montreal"
- Bruce Barris – engineering (all except "Montreal")
- Ted Jensen – mastering
- Don Smith – production (all except "Montreal")
- Mark Vreekan – mixing, engineering on "Montreal"

== Charts ==
Chart performance for Saskadelphia
Chart (2021)	Peak position
Belgian Albums (Ultratop Flanders)	158
Canadian Albums (Billboard)	2
US Top Current Albums (Billboard)	66
