= Boots or Hearts =

Single by The Tragically Hip

from the album Up to Here
- Released: January 1990
- Recorded: Ardent Studios (Memphis)
- Genre: Rock
- Length: 3:41
- Label: MCA
- Songwriters: Rob Baker; Gordon Downie; Johnny Fay; Paul Langlois; Gord Sinclair
- Producer: Don Smith

The Tragically Hip singles chronology
"New Orleans Is Sinking" (1989)	"Boots or Hearts" (1990)	"38 Years Old" (1990)

"Boots or Hearts" is a song by Canadian rock band The Tragically Hip. It was released in January 1990 as the third single from their second studio album, Up to Here. The song reached number 41 in Canada.

== Track listing ==
No.	Title	Length
1.	"Boots or Hearts"
2.	"I'll Believe in You (Or I'll Be Leaving You Tonight)"

== Charts ==
Chart (1990)	Peak position
Canadian RPM Top Singles Chart	41
Canadian RPM Canadian Content Chart	1
