= Wheat Kings =

1992 song by The Tragically Hip

Song by the Tragically Hip

from the album Fully Completely
- Released: October 6, 1992
- Recorded: August 1992
- Studio: Battery, London
- Genre: Folk rock
- Length: 4:19
- Label: MCA
- Songwriters: Rob Baker; Gord Downie; Johnny Fay; Paul Langlois; Gord Sinclair
- Producer: Chris Tsangarides

"Wheat Kings" is a song by Canadian rock band the Tragically Hip. It is the tenth track on the band's 1992 studio album Fully Completely. While the song was never released as a single, it has remained one of the band's most popular.

== Lyrics ==
The inspiration for the song's lyrics comes from the story of David Milgaard, a man who was wrongfully convicted for the 1969 rape and murder of Gail Miller in Saskatoon. He was sentenced to life in prison, although he ended up serving 23 years in prison, and was exonerated six months before the song's release.

When singer and lyricist Gord Downie was asked about the meaning of the song, he said it is "about David Milgaard and his faith in himself. And about his mother, Joyce, and her absolute faith in her son's innocence. And about our big country and its faith in man's fallibility. And about Gail Miller, all those mornings ago, just lying there, all her faith bleeding out into that Saskatoon snowbank."

== Composition ==
The music was composed by guitarist Paul Langlois. The original riff he wrote for the song sounded more like a Rolling Stones song, but on the advice of producer Chris Tsangarides, Langlois simplified it to major chords. The song follows a very simple chord progression, using only 3 chords: G-C in the verses, and D-G-C in the chorus.

The song opens with the sound of a loon's call, which was sampled from a CD of nature sounds. The choice to include the sound came from when David Milgaard was talking to Gord Downie about going canoeing with his father when he was younger and hearing the sounds of loons.

== Legacy ==
The song remains one of the band's most popular and acclaimed. Despite never being released as a single, it was certified Platinum by Music Canada in 2016, it is the band's second-most streamed song on Spotify, behind "Bobcaygeon", with 49.6 million streams as of September 2025, and was featured on the band's greatest-hits album, Yer Favourites.

It was placed in both CBC Music and Rolling Stone's list of 10 essential Tragically Hip songs. Rolling Stone mentions how the song has become a staple campfire song in Canada. In AllMusic's review of Fully Completely, Michael DeGagne called Wheat Kings "one of [the Tragically Hip's] best slow songs," and specifically praised Gord Downie's performance. David Milgaard, the subject of the song, praised it, saying he "truly loved it", and would listen to the song when he needed to feel better about his life.

Listeners often regard the Tragically Hip as a patriotic Canadian band, although this was a label that the band themselves had disagreed with. The lyrics to Wheat Kings have been cited as a clear example of the band's criticisms of Canada, pointing out David Milgaard's mistreatment by the Canadian Justice System.

In 2026, CBC Music published a ranking of the top ten Tragically Hip songs to mark the tenth anniversary of the band's historic final performance, ranking "Wheat Kings" at #3.

== Certifications ==
Region	Certification	Certified units/sales
Canada (Music Canada)	Platinum	80,000^{‡}
^{‡} Sales+streaming figures based on certification alone.
