= Hassan Kassai =

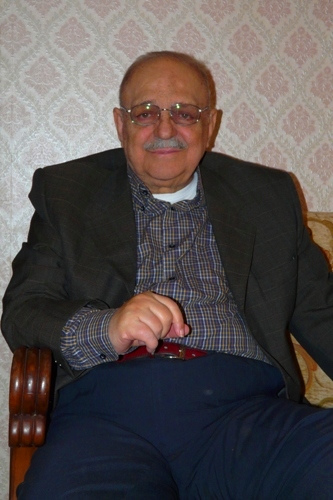

Background information
- Also known as: Hassan Kassa'i
- Born: Hassan Kassai; 25 September 1928; Isfahan, Iran
- Died: 14 June 2012 (aged 83) Isfahan, Iran
- Genres: Classical Persian Music
- Occupation: Musician
- Instrument: Ney
- Website: www.kassaimusic.ir

Hassan Kassai (Persian: حسن کسائی; 25 September 1928 – 14 June 2012) was a musician and player of Persian classical music. He played the ney, the traditional reed flute of Persia/Iran and the setar.

He learned music with his father Javad Kasaei, Jalal Tadj Esfahani and Adib Khansari for the singing,

== Notable students ==
- Hossein Omoumi
- Masood Arbabian
