= Hossein Omoumi =

Iranian-born musician (1944–2026)

Hossein Omoumi حسین عمومی
- Born: January 27, 1944; Isfahan, Iran
- Died: November 4, 2026 (aged 82) United States
- Genre: Classical Persian
- Occupations: Musician; composer; scholar; academic
- Instruments: Ney (reed flute); tombak (drum); daf (drum)
- Website: omoumi.com

Hossein Omoumi (27 January 1944 – 4 November 2026) was an Iranian-born master musician of the ney (reed flute), composer, scholar, and teacher of Persian traditional music. He was the Maseeh Professor in Persian Performing Arts in the department of music within the Claire Trevor School of the Arts, at the University of California, Irvine (UCI).

== Life and career ==
Omoumi was born in Isfahan, Iran, in 1944. He started studying at the age of 14 the ney, the traditional reed flute of Iran; and studied music under ney master Hassan Kassai. Early in his career he taught at the National Conservatory of Music in Iran. In 1972, he received a PhD in architecture from the University of Florence. In 1984, he moved to Paris where he taught at Sorbonne University.

He performed at many concerts and music festivals as a player of the ney. He is also known for original work with Persian traditional drums, particularly the tombak and daf. In 1997, Omoumi played the ney for The Sweet Hereafter soundtrack (1997).

His students included Alireza Ghorbani, and Hesam Abedini.

Omoumi died in the United States, on 4 November 2026, at the age of 82.
