= The Watch That Ends the Night =

1958 novel by Hugh MacLennan

- First edition
- Author: Hugh MacLennan
- Language: English
- Genre: Historical
- Publisher: Macmillan of Canada, New Canadian Library
- Publication date: 1958
- Publication place: Canada
- Pages: 372
- ISBN: 978-0773524965

The Watch That Ends the Night is a novel by Canadian author and academic Hugh MacLennan. The title refers to a line in Psalm 90. It was first published in 1958 by Macmillan of Canada.

== Plot summary ==
George and Catherine Stewart share not only the burden of Catherine's heart disease, which could cause her death at any time, but the memory of Jerome Martell, her first husband and George's closest friend. Martell, a brilliant doctor passionately concerned with social justice, is presumed to have died in a Nazi prison camp. His sudden return to Montreal precipitates the central crisis of the novel. Hugh MacLennan takes the reader into the lives of his three characters and back into the world of Montreal in the thirties, when politics could send an idealist across the world to Spain, France, Auschwitz, Russia, and China before his return home.

== Title ==
The title is a reference to a line in Isaac Watts' Our God, Our Help in Ages Past: The literal phrase, 'The watch that ends the night' is found only in the hymn, while the corresponding line in the psalm 90 which inspired it is "as a watch in the night".

A thousand ages in Thy sight
Are like an evening gone;
Short as the watch that ends the night
Before the rising sun.

This echoes the theme of mortality that is central to the plot of the novel. The hymn and the psalm as a whole contrast the brevity and struggle of human life with the eternity of God (and, in Christian interpretation, of life everlasting after death).

== Reception ==
The novel was a Canadian bestseller for almost four months in 1959. MacLennan received $70,000 in film rights.

Robertson Davies declared "The Canadian novel takes a great stride forward."

It is considered to be MacLennan's best novel, and an important Canadian novel.

The novel earned MacLennan the Canadian Governor General's Award for literature.

A passage from the book was adapted for use in the song "Courage (for Hugh MacLennan)" by Canadian rock band The Tragically Hip. The paraphrase comes in the song's last verse:

There's no simple explanation
For anything important any of us do
And yeah, the human tragedy
Consists in the necessity
Of living with the consequences

A number of elements from the novel are believed to reflect MacLennan's life. Catherine Stewart is believed to have been inspired by MacLennan's first wife, Dorothy Duncan, who was dying of the same ailment Catherine has while MacLennan was writing the novel. Another major character, Jerome Martell, is generally thought to have been inspired by Norman Bethune, a claim the author denied. MacLennan's biographer, Elspeth Cameron, points to F. R. Scott and Samuel MacLennan, the author's father, as models for Martell. However, Mr. MacLennan, in a 1965 newspaper article referring to his neurologist, Dr. Reuben Rabinovitch of Montreal wrote: “When my novel, ‘The Watch That Ends The Night,’ appeared, it was widely believed that its doctor-protagonist, Dr. Jerome Martell, was modeled on the famous Dr. Norman Bethune. He wasn't, for I never knew Bethune. But Martell's way of dealing with his patients was Dr. Rab's way. This is not to suggest that Martell was modeled off him; he wasn't. But if I had not known Dr. Rab, I could never have understood Dr. Martell." Dr. Martell's life history was also notably quite similar to that of Dr. Rabinovitch. Douglas Gibson, Hugh MacLennan's friend and publisher, wrote: "Hugh later suggested that a real-life model for Jerome Martell was actually Frank Scott, the poet, McGill Law School scholar, and leader of Montreal left-wing politics who became one of the founders of the CCF party."
