= The Precipice (MacLennan novel) =

1948 novel written by Hugh MacLennan

- First edition
- Author: Hugh MacLennan
- Language: English
- Publisher: Collins
- Publication date: 1948
- Publication place: Canada
- Media type: Print
- Awards: Governor General's Literary Award

The Precipice is a 1948 novel written by Hugh MacLennan. It won the Governor General's Award for English-language fiction at the 1948 Governor General's Awards. MacLennan partly based The Precipice on the ballet Pillar of Fire, whose cast included Nora Kaye and Antony Tudor.
