= Three Pistols =

Single by The Tragically Hip

from the album Road Apples
- Released: 1991
- Recorded: September 1990
- Studio: Barris Studios (New Orleans)
- Genre: Rock
- Length: 3:48
- Label: MCA
- Songwriter: The Tragically Hip
- Producer: Don Smith

The Tragically Hip singles chronology
"Little Bones" (1991)	"Three Pistols" (1991)	"Twist My Arm" (1991)

"Three Pistols" is a song by The Tragically Hip. The song was released as the second single from the band's second studio album, Road Apples. The song reached No. 1 on the RPM CANCON (Canadian Content) chart. The title of the song refers to the city of Trois-Pistoles, Quebec, and the song is about the Canadian artist Tom Thomson.

== Charts ==
Year	Peak Chart Position	
Year	CAN	CAN Content (Cancon)
1991	59	1
