= Twist My Arm =

Single by The Tragically Hip

from the album Road Apples
- Released: June 1991
- Recorded: Barris Studios (New Orleans); September 1990
- Genre: Funk rock
- Length: 3:54
- Label: MCA
- Songwriter: The Tragically Hip
- Producer: Don Smith

The Tragically Hip singles chronology
"Three Pistols" (1991)	"Twist My Arm" (1991)	"Long Time Running" (1991)

"Twist My Arm" is the third single from The Tragically Hip's second full-length studio album, Road Apples.

The single's B-side is a live version of the song "Highway Girl" from the band's debut EP, in which Gord Downie tells the story of a suicide pact between a man and his girlfriend. It was a hit on Canadian radio, allowing the song to chart considerably higher than in its original form, and contains some lines which would later recur as lyrics in the band's 1992 single "Locked in the Trunk of a Car".

== Track listing ==
No.	Title	Writer(s)	Length
1.	"Twist My Arm"	The Tragically Hip	3:54
2.	"Highway Girl" (Live)	Gord Downie; Rob Baker	7:37
Total length:			11:31

== Charts ==
Year	Peak Chart Position	
Year	CAN	CAN Content (Cancon)
1991	22	3
