= Up to Here =

1989 album by the Tragically Hip

Studio album by The Tragically Hip
- Released: September 5, 1989
- Studios: Ardent, Memphis, Tennessee
- Genres: Alternative rock; roots rock; folk rock; country rock; blues rock
- Length: 43:29
- Label: MCA
- Producer: Don Smith

The Tragically Hip chronology
The Tragically Hip (1987)	Up to Here (1989)	Road Apples (1991)

Singles from Up to Here
- 1. "Blow at High Dough" Released: April 1989; 2. "New Orleans Is Sinking" Released: November 1989; 3. "Boots or Hearts" Released: February 1990; 4. "38 Years Old" Released: April 1990

Up to Here is the debut studio album by Canadian rock band the Tragically Hip, released in September 1989. It is one of the band's most successful albums, achieving diamond status in Canada for sales of over a million copies, earning the band a Juno Award for Most Promising Artist, and also introduced fan-favourite songs such as "Blow at High Dough", "New Orleans Is Sinking", and "Boots or Hearts". The album reached No. 13 on RPM's Canadian Albums Chart, and both "Blow at High Dough" and "New Orleans is Sinking" reached No. 1 on the RPM Canadian Content singles charts.

An expanded anniversary reissue of the album was released in November 2024, including a remastered version of the band's 1990 MuchMusic concert special Live at the Misty Moon and previously unreleased tracks from the era. The reissue was preceded by lead single "Get Back Again", one of the most famous rarities in the band's entire discography as they had occasionally performed it live but had never previously released a studio recording.

== Background ==
The Tragically Hip toured extensively following their first release, The Tragically Hip, which had earned considerable airplay on Canadian FM radio and the MuchMusic video station. The band found an audience on US college radio as well and drew the attention of MCA representative Bruce Dickinson while performing at the CMJ New Music Festival in New York City in late 1988. That December Dickinson travelled to Toronto to see the band perform at the Toronto Music Awards, and MCA signed the band later that month.

Dickinson recommended the band record in Memphis, Tennessee, with producer Don Smith. The band entered Ardent Studios with a set of songs they had extensive experience playing live. Smith and the band further developed the arrangements in the studio before recording. The songs are credited to the whole band. The band's instrumentalists typically had the most influence on the music composition of the album while lead singer Gord Downie came up with his poetic lyrics separately, writing them in a notebook and incorporating them when the band was ready.

== Release and reception ==
Professional ratings
Review scores
Source	Rating
AllMusic	4.5/5 stars
PopMatters	8/10

Up to Here was released on 5 September 1989. It sold 100000 copies within its first year in Canada and ranked 14th Canadian Content album for 1989, fifth for 1990, and first for 1991. The album peaked at No. 13 in February 1990 on RPM's Canadian Albums Chart. The album went gold in Canada in January 1990 and platinum that March and later that year earned the band a Juno Award for Most Promising Artist. In 1999 Up to Here was awarded diamond status.

Up to Here was the band's first release in the US. In 1990, the album peaked on the Billboard 200 album chart at No. 170 and "New Orleans Is Sinking" reached No. 30 on Billboard's Mainstream Rock singles chart. Despite strong sales and sustained popularity in Canada, the band and album failed to find a significant international audience; American sales of the album were 10000 in its first year and from 1991 to 1997 amounted to 80000 copies. The Tragically Hip's relative lack of success in the US has been a frequent topic by commenters and interviewers, to the irritation of members of the band.

=== Singles ===
The hard-rocking lead single "Blow at High Dough" was released in April 1989, before the album's release. It had a strong presence on Canadian radio and was the band's first charting single, reaching No. 48 on the RPM singles chart and No. 1 on the RPM Canadian Content singles charts. "Blow at High Dough" was the theme song to the CBC comedy drama Made in Canada (1998—2003).

In November 1989, the second single was released, "New Orleans Is Sinking", a loose jam piece which had been a key part the band's live shows. In the midst of "New Orleans" the band often débuted new songs or gave Downie the spotlight to improvise. Like "Blow at High Dough", it reached No. 1 on the RPM Canadian Content singles charts, and No. 70 on the RPM singles charts. Music videos were released for both "Blow at High Dough" and "New Orleans is Sinking".

"Boots or Hearts" came out as the third single in February 1990, and "38 Years Old" followed in April 1990 as the fourth, peaking at No. 41 on the RPM singles charts. Downie's memories of a jailbreak in 1972 at the maximum-security Millhaven Institution inspired the lyrics to "38 Years Old", whose ringing acoustic guitar backing is overlaid with distorted electric guitar leads.

"Get Back Again", which was the lead single for the 2024 reissue, was left off the original album after having been plagued with problems during the recording process.

== Touring ==
The Tragically Hip went on tour from June 1989 prior to the album's release. (Note: During this tour, the Seattle band Nirvana opened for the Tragically Hip in Madison, Wisconsin, on 7 July 1989 to an audience of 40.) The band continued to tour Canada and the US through 1990, and made its first European appearance at a sold-out headlining show in Rotterdam. The band gained a reputation for its energetic live shows and the enthusiasm of its fans.

The band introduced new material while touring which appeared on their next album Road Apples in 1991, along with numerous songs that, at the time, had never been officially released.

== Track listing ==
All tracks are written by The Tragically Hip.

Original 1989 track listing
No.	Title	Length
1.	"Blow at High Dough"	4:37
2.	"I'll Believe in You (Or I'll Be Leaving You Tonight)"	4:04
3.	"New Orleans Is Sinking"	4:17
4.	"38 Years Old"	4:20
5.	"She Didn't Know"	3:33
6.	"Boots or Hearts"	3:44
7.	"Everytime You Go"	3:21
8.	"When the Weight Comes Down"	4:44
9.	"Trickle Down"	3:11
10.	"Another Midnight"	3:56
11.	"Opiated"	3:42
Total length:		43:29

2024 box set, Live at the Misty Moon + Unreleased Studio Tracks
No.	Title	Length
1.	"Crack My Spine Like a Whip"
2.	"She Didn't Know"
3.	"Highway Girl"
4.	"Just as Well"
5.	"Boots or Hearts"
6.	"Trickle Down"
7.	"Get Back Again"
8.	"Three Pistols"
9.	"Fight"
10.	"38 Years Old"
11.	"Blow at High Dough"
12.	"I'll Believe in You (Or I'll Be Leaving You Tonight)"
13.	"New Orleans Is Sinking"
14.	"On the Verge"
15.	"She's Got What It Takes"
16.	"Get Back Again"
17.	"Rain, Hearts and Fire"
18.	"Wait So Long"

2024 box set, How We Got Here: The 1988 Demos
No.	Title	Length
1.	"Hailstone Hands of God"
2.	"When the Weight Comes Down"
3.	"I'll Believe in You (Or I'll Be Leaving You Tonight)"
4.	"New Orleans Is Sinking"
5.	"Rain, Hearts and Fire"
6.	"She Didn't Know"
7.	"Blow at High Dough"
8.	"Boots or Hearts"
9.	"Everytime You Go"
10.	"Just Another Midnight"

== Personnel ==
Personnel taken from Up to Here liner notes.

The Tragically Hip

- Bobby Baker – guitar
- Gord Downie – vocals
- Johnny Fay – drums
- Gord Sinclair – bass, vocals; acoustic guitar on "38 Years Old"
- Paul Langlois – guitars, vocals; bass on "38 Years Old"

Technical personnel

- Bruce Barris – engineer, mixing
- Jeff DeMorris – assistant engineer
- Paul Eberson – assistant engineer
- Stephen Marcussen – mastering
- Don Smith – engineer, mixing, producer
- Andy Udoff – assistant engineer
- Jeanne Bradshaw – design
- Michael Going – photography

== Year-end charts ==
2002 year-end chart performance for Up to Here
Chart (2002)	Position
Canadian Alternative Albums (Nielsen SoundScan)	80

== Certifications ==
Region	Certification	Certified units/sales
Canada (Music Canada)	Diamond	1,000,000^{^}
^{^} Shipments figures based on certification alone.
