= Two Solitudes (novel) =

1945 novel by Hugh MacLennan

- First edition (Canada)
- Author: Hugh MacLennan
- Language: English
- Genre: Historical, romance
- Publisher: Macmillan of Canada
- Publication date: 1945
- Publication place: Canada

Two Solitudes is a 1945 novel by Hugh MacLennan. It popularized the term two solitudes to refer to the perceived lack of communication between English- and French-speaking Canadians.

== Plot summary ==
The novel's plot revolves around the life and times of the fictional character Paul Tallard and this character's struggles in reconciling the differences between his English and French Canadian identities.

== Recognition and adaptations ==
Two Solitudes was selected as one of the five novels to be discussed in the 2013 Canada Reads "battle of the books", broadcast by CBC Radio. It was defended by Canadian actor Jay Baruchel but it lost to Lisa Moore's February.

In 1978 it was made into a motion picture, written and directed by Lionel Chetwynd.
