= Two Solitudes (film) =

- Film poster
- Directed by: Lionel Chetwynd
- Written by: Lionel Chetwynd
- Based on: Two Solitudes by Hugh MacLennan
- Produced by: Harry Gulkin; James Shavick
- Starring: Jean-Pierre Aumont; Stacy Keach; Gloria Carlin; Chris Wiggins; Claude Jutra; Raymond Cloutier; Jean-Louis Roux; John Boylan; Louis Negin
- Cinematography: René Verzier
- Edited by: Ralph Brunjes
- Music by: Maurice Jarre
- Production company: Compass Films
- Distributed by: New World-Mutual
- Release date: September 29, 1978
- Running time: 117 minutes
- Country: Canada
- Language: English

Two Solitudes is a 1978 Canadian drama film written and directed by Lionel Chetwynd.

== Summary ==
An adaptation of the 1945 novel by Hugh MacLennan, the film depicts French-English relations in Quebec during World War I and 1919 through the story of Jean-Claude Tallard (Jean-Pierre Aumont), a Member of Parliament who tries to pursue economic development opportunities for his impoverished rural area in conjunction with the wealthy Montreal industrialist Huntley McQueen (Stacy Keach) against the backdrop of the deep lingering mistrust between English Canadians and French Canadians in the aftermath of the Conscription Crisis of 1917.

The film was marketed around the theme that it would provide Canadians with insight into the victory of the Parti québécois in the 1976 Quebec general election and thus preserve national unity in the forthcoming 1980 Quebec referendum. However, the film was criticized for casting French and American, rather than Canadian, actors in its two lead roles. Aumont, in particular, was criticized for not even attempting a Québécois accent and thus sounding out of place in the film.

Music for the film was composed by Maurice Jarre, his first and only work for a Canadian film.

== Cast ==
- Jean-Pierre Aumont as Jean-Claude Tallard
- Stacy Keach as Huntley McQueen
- Gloria Carlin as Kathleen Tallard
- Chris Wiggins as Captain Yardley
- Claude Jutra as Father Beaubien
- Raymond Cloutier as Marius Tallard
- Jean-Louis Roux as Cardinal
- Louis Negin
- Murray Westgate as the Prime Minister of Canada
