= Courage (for Hugh MacLennan) =

1993 single by the Tragically Hip

Single by The Tragically Hip

from the album Fully Completely
- Released: February 1993
- Recorded: Battery Studios (London)
- Genre: Rock
- Length: 4:27
- Label: MCA
- Songwriters: Rob Baker; Gordon Downie; Johnny Fay; Paul Langlois; Gord Sinclair
- Producer: Chris Tsangarides

The Tragically Hip singles chronology
"Fifty Mission Cap" (1993)	"Courage (for Hugh MacLennan)" (1993)	"At the Hundredth Meridian" (1993)

Alternative Cover
- Cover of UK version

"Courage (for Hugh MacLennan)" is a song by Canadian rock band The Tragically Hip. It was released in February 1993 as the third single from their 1992 album Fully Completely. The song's bracketed title references author Hugh MacLennan, because lines from his 1959 novel The Watch That Ends the Night are paraphrased in the song's final verse.

The song was the most successful Tragically Hip song up to that point, reaching number 10 on Canada's RPM Singles Chart, and also charting well in the United States, becoming their highest charting song in the U.S., and the Netherlands. The song was nominated for "Single of the Year" at the 1994 Juno Awards.

== Legacy ==
In 2000, "Courage" was voted as the 12th best New Rock song released between 1990 and 2000 by CFNY-FM listeners. Between 1995 and 2016, "Courage" was the most played Tragically Hip song on rock radio stations in Canada.

In 2026, CBC Music published a ranking of the top ten Tragically Hip songs to mark the tenth anniversary of the band's historic final performance, ranking "Courage" at #4.

== Covers ==
In 1997, the song was covered by Sarah Polley for use in the film The Sweet Hereafter and its soundtrack. The cover version was also used in the television series Charmed. Singer-songwriter Justin Rutledge also covered the song for his 2014 album Daredevil, an album consisting entirely of Tragically Hip covers.

== Track listing ==
All tracks are written by The Tragically Hip.

No.	Title	Length
1.	"Courage (for Hugh MacLennan)"	4:25
2.	"Fifty Mission Cap" (Live)	4:00
3.	"Pigeon Camera" (Live)	4:23
Total length:		12:48

== Personnel ==
- Gord Downie – vocals
- Bobby Baker – guitar
- Paul Langlois – guitar, vocals
- Johnny Fay – drums
- Gord Sinclair – bass, vocals

== Charts ==
=== Weekly charts ===
Chart (1993)	Peak position
Canadian RPM Singles Chart	10
Netherlands (Dutch Top 40)	17
U.S. Billboard Mainstream Rock Tracks	16
U.S. Billboard Modern Rock Tracks	16

=== Year-end charts ===
Chart (1993)	Position
Canada Top Singles (RPM)	90
