= Dorothy Duncan =

American writer and artist (1903 – 1957)

- Born: 1903
- Died: April 22, 1957 (aged 53)
- Occupation: Writer (novelist)
- Writing career
- Period: 20th century
- Genres: History, fiction

Dorothy Duncan (1903 – April 22, 1957), American writer and artist, won the Governor General's Award for English-language non-fiction in 1946 for her book Partner in Three Worlds.

Born in East Orange, New Jersey in 1903 to Dorothy and Edwin L. Duncan, Dorothy Duncan grew up in the Chicago area and suffered from rheumatic fever which limited her physical abilities in later years. She earned a Bachelor of Science at Northwestern University in 1925 and worked in a variety of small businesses in Chicago. During a return journey from Europe in 1932, Duncan met Hugh MacLennan on board the SS Pennland. They married in 1936 and settled in Montreal.

Duncan wrote several semi-autographical works describing her encounters with Canadian culture before her health began to limit her activities in the late 1940s. Her award-winning Partner in Three Worlds was a biography of Jan Rieger, a Czech-Canadian soldier who fought in both World Wars.

Duncan died on Easter Day in 1957 of cancer.

== Works ==
- You Can Live in an Apartment (1939)
- Here's to Canada! (1941)
- Bluenose: A Portrait of Nova Scotia (1942)
- Partner in Three Worlds (1944)
