= Blow at High Dough =

Single by The Tragically Hip

from the album Up to Here
- Released: April 1989
- Recorded: Ardent Studios (Memphis)
- Genre: Hard rock
- Length: 4:36
- Label: MCA
- Songwriters: Rob Baker; Gordon Downie; Johnny Fay; Paul Langlois; Gord Sinclair
- Producer: Don Smith

The Tragically Hip singles chronology
"Highway Girl" (1988)	"Blow at High Dough" (1989)	"New Orleans Is Sinking" (1989)

"Blow at High Dough" is a song by Canadian rock band The Tragically Hip, released in April 1989 as the lead single from their first full-length studio album, Up to Here. It reached No. 1 on the RPM CANCON chart, and was the opening theme song of the CBC Television series Made in Canada. It's one of The Tragically Hip's most iconic songs.

== Charts ==
Chart (1989)	Peak position
Canadian RPM Singles Chart	48
RPM Canadian Content Chart	1
