= Hugh MacLennan =

Canadian writer (1907–1990)

Hugh MacLennan CC CQ FRSL FRSC
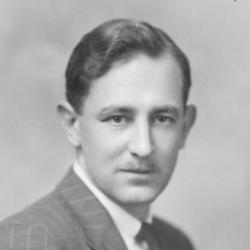
- MacLennan in 1943
- Born: John Hugh MacLennan; March 20, 1907; Glace Bay, Nova Scotia, Canada
- Died: November 7, 1990 (aged 83); Montreal, Quebec, Canada
- Spouses: Dorothy Duncan (m. 1936; died 1957); Aline Walker (m. 1959)
- Writing career
- Notable works: Barometer Rising (1941); Two Solitudes (1945); The Watch That Ends the Night (1958)
- Notable awards: Governor General's Literary Award (1945; 1948; 1949; 1954; 1959)

Academic background
- Education: Dalhousie University; Oriel College, Oxford; Princeton University
- Thesis: Oxyrhynchus: An Economic and Social Study (1935)

Academic work
- Discipline: Literature
- Institutions: McGill University
- Notable students: Marian Engel

John Hugh MacLennan CC CQ FRSL FRSC (March 20, 1907 – November 7, 1990) was a Canadian writer and professor of English at McGill University. He won five Governor General's Awards and a Royal Bank Award.

== Family and childhood ==
MacLennan was born in Glace Bay, Nova Scotia, on March 20, 1907. His parents were Samuel MacLennan, a colliery physician, and Katherine MacQuarrie; Hugh also had an older sister named Frances. Samuel was a stern Calvinist, while Katherine was creative, warm and dreamy, and both parents would be large influences on Hugh's character. In 1913, the family spent several months in London while Samuel took on further study to become a medical specialist. On returning to Canada, they briefly lived in Sydney, Nova Scotia, before settling in Halifax. In December 1917, young Hugh experienced the Halifax Explosion, which he would later write about in his first published novel, Barometer Rising. From the ages of twelve to twenty-one, he slept in a tent in the family's backyard, even in the cold winter, possibly as an escape from his strict father. Hugh grew up believing in the importance of religion; he and Frances regularly went to Sunday school, and the family attended Presbyterian church services twice each Sunday. He was also active in sports, and became especially good at tennis, eventually winning the Nova Scotia men's double championship in 1927.

== Education ==
MacLennan and his sister were pushed extremely hard by their father to spend long hours learning the classics. While this was very difficult for Frances, who had no interest in Greek, Hugh grew to enjoy this field of study. Their father had an ambitious educational path planned for Hugh: studying the classics at Dalhousie University, getting a Rhodes Scholarship, and then continuing his studies in England.

While at Dalhousie, he realized that his inner wish was to pursue an artistic career, the influence of his creative mother. At Oxford, he struggled with balancing his passion for Greek and Latin studies with these artistic instincts. In his first year at the university's Oriel College, MacLennan worked incredibly hard at his classics courses, but was only able to achieve second-class honours. By his second year, he had resigned himself to such results, and while still working diligently, decided not to overwork himself as before. In his fourth year, he was finding it increasingly difficult to concentrate on his studies and spent more and more time at tennis and writing poetry. In letters to his family from around this time are hints that he hoped to be a successful writer. In late 1931, MacLennan sent some of his poetry to three publishers, including the firms of John Lane and Elkin Mathews, but it was turned down.

MacLennan's four years in Oxford gave him the opportunity to travel throughout Europe, and he visited countries such as Switzerland, France, Greece, and Italy. He spent some of his holidays lodging with a family in Germany, through which he acquired a very good proficiency in German. His travels and his exposure to different political ideas caused MacLennan to begin to question his father's puritanical, conservative attitudes that he had until then taken for granted.

MacLennan won a $400 scholarship to continue his studies at Princeton University, and despite his growing disinclination to keep studying the classics, he decided to go there. This was partly to appease his father, and partly because the Great Depression meant that there were few jobs available. In June 1932, while sailing home from England, he met his future wife, American Dorothy Duncan. Falling in love with her made him change his mind about Princeton. For one thing, his father insisted he should not get married before becoming financially independent, which would mean delaying marriage at least until his graduation. In addition, MacLennan was already unhappy about having to accept money from his father for the part of his Princeton studies that would not be covered by his scholarship. However, his applications were rejected from both of the Canadian universities he applied to that had classics department positions opening; thus, he grudgingly agreed to go to Princeton after all.

His three years at Princeton were unhappy. The style of classical study there was very different from what he was used to at Oxford, with Princeton's scholarship "consist[ing] of extremely detailed analyses of classical texts and sources—thorough, but unoriginal." He began to rebel against his father's ideals: he stopped going to church and put increasing energy into his writing at the expense of his studies; furthermore, in addition to resenting his financial dependence on his father, he continued his relationship with Dorothy even though he knew his father would not approve of her American, Lowland Scottish, Christian Science, business-world background.

== Unpublished novels ==
At Princeton, MacLennan wrote his first novel, So All Their Praises. He found one publisher who was willing to take the manuscript, as long as he made certain changes; however, this company went out of business before the book could be published. In spring 1935, he finished his PhD thesis, Oxyrhynchus: An Economic and Social Study, about the decline of a Roman colony in Egypt, which was published by Princeton University Press and reprinted in 1968 by A.M. Hakkert.

In 1935, there were very few teaching jobs available as a result of the Depression, and MacLennan's field of study, the classics, was in particular becoming less significant in North American education. He took a position at Lower Canada College in Montreal, Quebec, even though he felt it was beneath him, as just his Dalhousie BA would have been a sufficient qualification for the job. He generally did not enjoy working there, and resented the long hours required of him for low pay, but was nonetheless a stimulating teacher, at least for the brighter students. MacLennan would later poke fun at Lower Canada College in his depiction of Waterloo School in The Watch That Ends the Night. On June 22, 1936, he and Dorothy were wed near her home in Wilmette, Illinois, and settled in Montreal.

Meanwhile, in 1934–1938, MacLennan was working on his second novel, A Man Should Rejoice. Longman, Green and Company and Duell, Sloan and Pearce both showed strong interest in the novel, but in the end neither published it.

In February 1939, MacLennan's father died after suffering from high blood pressure. It was a huge surprise to MacLennan, as in the previous year they had just begun to become closer and to reconcile their opposing views. For several months after his father's death MacLennan continued to write letters to him, in which he discussed his thoughts on the possibility and implications of a war in Europe.

== Barometer Rising ==
Dorothy convinced MacLennan that the failure of his first two novels was due to his having set one in Europe and the other in the United States; she persuaded him to write about Canada, the country he knew best. She told him that "Nobody's going to understand Canada until she evolves a literature of her own, and you're the fellow to start bringing Canadian novels up to date." Until then there had been a sporadic tradition of Anglo-Canadian literature, with such writers as Thomas Chandler Haliburton (1796–1865), Susanna Moodie (1803–1885), L. M. Montgomery (1874–1942), Stephen Leacock (1869-1944), Morley Callaghan (1903 – 1990), and W. O. Mitchell (1914–1998). MacLennan set out to define Canada for Canadians through a national novel.

Barometer Rising, his novel about the social class structure of Nova Scotia and the Halifax Explosion of 1917, was published in 1941.

== Later novels ==
His most famous novel, Two Solitudes, a literary allegory for the tensions between English and French Canada, followed in 1945. That year, he left Lower Canada College. Two Solitudes won MacLennan his first Governor General's Award for Fiction. In 1948, MacLennan published The Precipice, which again won the Governor General's Award. The following year, he published a collection of essays, Cross Country, which won the Governor General's Award for Non-Fiction.

In 1951, MacLennan returned to teaching, accepting a position at McGill University. In 1952, he was made a fellow of the Royal Society of Canada and awarded the society's Lorne Pierce Medal. In 1954, he published another essay collection, Thirty and Three, which again won the Governor General's Award for Non-Fiction. In 1956, he was made a fellow of the Royal Society of Literature.

One of MacLennan's students at McGill was Marian Engel, who became a noted Canadian novelist in the 1970s. He served as her master's supervisor in c. 1958. Another notable student was Leonard Cohen, the popular songwriter, poet and novelist.

Dorothy Duncan died in 1957. MacLennan married his second wife, Aline Walker, in 1959. That same year, he published The Watch That Ends the Night, which won his final Governor General's Award.

In 1967, he was made a Companion of the Order of Canada. In 1985, he was made a Knight of the National Order of Quebec. MacLennan continued to write and publish work, with his final novel Voices in Time appearing in 1980.

== Death and legacy ==
He died on November 7, 1990, in Montreal, Quebec.

The Canadian band The Tragically Hip adapted a passage from The Watch That Ends the Night in the song "Courage (for Hugh MacLennan)" from their album Fully Completely.

== Bibliography ==
=== Novels ===
- Man Should Rejoice, a critical edition by Hugh MacLennan; edited and with an introduction by Colin Hill, Ottawa: University of Ottawa Press, April 2019, ISBN 978-0-7766-2799-1
- Barometer Rising (1941)
- Two Solitudes (1945)
- The Precipice (1948)
- Each Man's Son (1951)
- The Watch That Ends the Night (1957)
- Return of the Sphinx (1967)
- Voices in Time (1980)

=== Non-fiction ===
- Oxyrhyncus : An Economic and Social Study (1935)
- Canadian Unity and Quebec (1942)
- Cross Country (1949)
- The Future of the Novel as an Art Form (1959)
- Scotchman's Return and Other Essays (1960)
- Seven Rivers of Canada (1961). US title The Rivers of Canada: The Mackenzie, the St. Lawrence, the Ottawa, the Red, the Saskatchewan, the Fraser, the St. John (1962).
- The Colour of Canada (1967)
- The Other Side of Hugh MacLennan (1978)
- On Being a Maritime Writer (1984)
- Dear Marian, Dear Hugh:The MacLennan–Engel Correspondence (1995; ed. Christl Verduyn)

== See also ==
- Two Solitudes (film)

Awards
Preceded by Gwethalyn Graham	Governor General's Award for English-language fiction 1945	Succeeded by Winifred Bambrick
Preceded by Gabrielle Roy	Governor General's Award for English-language fiction 1948	Succeeded by Philip Child
Preceded by Thomas H. Raddall	Governor General's Award for English-language non-fiction 1949; With: Robert MacGregor Dawson	Succeeded by Marjorie Wilkins Campbell
Preceded by C. P. Stacey	Governor General's Award for English-language non-fiction 1949; With: Robert MacGregor Dawson	Succeeded by W. L. Morton
Preceded by E. K. Brown	Lorne Pierce Medal; 1952	Succeeded by Earle Birney
Preceded by N. J. Berrill	Governor General's Award for English-language non-fiction 1954; With: Arthur R. M. Lower	Succeeded by N. J. Berrill
Preceded by J. M. S. Careless	Governor General's Award for English-language non-fiction 1954; With: Arthur R. M. Lower	Succeeded by Donald Creighton
Preceded by Colin McDougall	Governor General's Award for English-language fiction 1959	Succeeded by Brian Moore
Preceded by Jean Gascon	Molson Prize; 1967; With: Georges-Henri Lévesque	Succeeded by Arthur Erickson
Preceded by F. R. Scott	Molson Prize; 1967; With: Georges-Henri Lévesque	Succeeded by Anne Hébert
Preceded by F. R. Scott	Molson Prize; 1967; With: Georges-Henri Lévesque	Succeeded by Marshall McLuhan
No award Last awarded to Marian Engel	Canadian Authors Association; Award for Fiction; 1981	Succeeded by Joy Kogawa
